= Tennessee State Route 193 =

Highway in Tennessee

State Route 193
- Macon Road
- SR 193 highlighted in red

Route information
- Maintained by TDOT
- Length: 17.2 mi (27.7 km)
- Existed: July 1, 1983–present

Major junctions
- West end: SR 205 in Fisherville
- I-269 near Fisherville
- East end: SR 76 in Williston

Location
- Country: United States
- State: Tennessee
- Counties: Shelby, Fayette

Highway system
- Tennessee State Routes; Interstate; US; State
← SR 192	→ SR 194

State Route 193 (SR 193) is a two-lane state route in West Tennessee. It runs from SR 205 in Fisherville, through the community of Macon and ends at SR 76 in Williston. In Shelby County, the highway is known as Macon Road.

== Route description ==
SR 193 begins in Shelby County in Fisherville at an intersection with SR 205. It goes east to an interchange with I-269 (exit 11) before leaving Fisherville and crossing into Fayette County. SR 193 continues east to an intersection with SR 196 before passing through rural and mostly wooded areas. It then passes through Macon, where it has a short concurrency with SR 194, before passing through farmland and crossing a Y-intersection with SR 195. SR 193 continues east through farmland to Williston, where it comes to an end at an intersection with SR 76.

== Major intersections ==
County	Location	mi	km	Destinations	Notes
Shelby	Fisherville	0.0	0.0	SR 205 (Collierville Arlington Road) – Collierville, Arlington	Western terminus; road continues west as Macon Road
Shelby	Fisherville	1.4– 1.6	2.3– 2.6	I-269 (Winfield Dunn Parkway) – Collierville, Arlington	I-269 exit 11
Fayette		4.1	6.6	SR 196 (Chulahoma Road) – Piperton, Hickory Withe	
Fayette	Macon	10.0	16.1	SR 194 north (Oakland Road) – Oakland	Western end of SR 194 concurrency
Fayette	Macon	10.3	16.6	SR 194 south (Rossville Road) – Rossville	Eastern end of SR 194 concurrency
Fayette		12.6	20.3	SR 195 east – Somerville	Western terminus of SR 195; provides access to Fayette County Airport
Fayette	Williston	17.2	27.7	SR 76 – Somerville, Moscow	Eastern terminus
1.000 mi = 1.609 km; 1.000 km = 0.621 mi: Concurrency terminus
