= Tennessee State Route 195 =

Highway in Tennessee

State Route 195
- SR 195 highlighted in red

Route information
- Maintained by TDOT
- Length: 7.6 mi (12.2 km)
- Existed: July 1, 1983–present

Major junctions
- West end: SR 193 near Macon
- East end: SR 76 in Somerville

Location
- Country: United States
- State: Tennessee
- Counties: Fayette

Highway system
- Tennessee State Routes; Interstate; US; State
← SR 194	→ SR 196

State Route 195 (SR 195) is a 7.6-mile long east–west state highway in Fayette County, Tennessee. It connects Macon with Somerville, as well as providing access to Fayette County Airport.

== Route description ==
SR 195 begins just east of Macon at a Y-intersection with SR 193. It heads northeast through farmland and wooded areas to have an intersection with Teague Store Road before passing by Wesley Church. The highway then turns east to have an intersection with Airport Road, the access road into Fayette County Airport. SR 195 then turns northeast again through more wooded areas to cross a bridge over a creek before it enters Somerville, where it passes through some neighborhoods before coming to an end at a Y-intersection with SR 76 just south of downtown. The entire route of SR 195 is a two-lane highway.

== Major intersections ==
The entire route is in Fayette County.

Location	mi	km	Destinations	Notes
	0.0	0.0	SR 193 (Macon Road) – Macon, Williston	Western terminus
	4.1	6.6	Airport Road - Fayette County Airport	Access road into airport
Somerville	7.6	12.2	SR 76 (S Main Street) – Brownsville, Downtown, Williston, Moscow	Eastern terminus
1.000 mi = 1.609 km; 1.000 km = 0.621 mi
