= Tennessee State Route 196 =

State highway in Tennessee, United States

State Route 196
- Chulahoma Road
- SR 196 highlighted in red

Route information
- Maintained by TDOT
- Length: 25.6 mi (41.2 km)
- Existed: July 1, 1983–present

Major junctions
- South end: US 72 in Piperton at the Mississippi State Line
- US 64 in Hickory Withe; I-40 in Gallaway
- North end: US 70 / US 79 in Gallaway

Location
- Country: United States
- State: Tennessee
- Counties: Fayette

Highway system
- Tennessee State Routes; Interstate; US; State
← SR 195	→ SR 197

State Route 196 (SR 196) is a state highway located within Fayette County, Tennessee. It runs from Piperton north to Gallaway. The entire route is a two-lane rural highway.

== Route description ==
SR 196 begins at US 72 (SR 86) in Piperton, within 1,500 feet of the Tennessee state line with Mississippi. It travels north until it intersects with Old State Line Road near the center of town and turns east then north across the Norfolk Southern Railway. It crosses SR 57 near the commercial center of Piperton. It continues north and crosses the Wolf River. From here it heads in an easterly direction somewhat parallel with the river and then turns sharply north again. After about 10 miles, it crosses SR 193 near the community of Canadaville. From here the road curves through relatively hilly terrain for the area. It intersects US 64 (SR 15) in the community of Hickory Withe. Until a few years ago, the road intersected at US 64, turned west along the highway, and turned north at a separate intersection. However the southern portion was rerouted to line up with the northern portion and a traffic light was added at the intersection. From Hickory Withe, the road continues north, has an interchange with I-40 (Exit 28), crosses the Loosahatchie River, and ends at US 70/US 79 (SR 1) in Gallaway.

== Major intersections ==
The entire route is in Fayette County.

Location	mi	km	Destinations	Notes
Piperton	0.0	0.0	US 72 (SR 86) – Collierville, Corinth, MS	Southern terminus; intersection lies 1,500 feet northwest of Mississippi state line
Piperton			SR 57 – Collierville, Rossville	
			Bridge over the Wolf River	
			SR 193 (Macon Road) – Fisherville, Macon	
Hickory Withe			US 64 (SR 15) – Bartlett, Oakland	
Gallaway			I-40 – Memphis, Nashville	I-40 exit 28
Gallaway			Bridge over the Loosahatchie River	
Gallaway	25.6	41.2	US 70 / US 79 (SR 1) – Arlington, Braden	Northern terminus
1.000 mi = 1.609 km; 1.000 km = 0.621 mi
