= Tennessee State Route 194 =

Highway in Tennessee

State Route 194
- SR 194 highlighted in red

Route information
- Maintained by TDOT
- Length: 23.5 mi (37.8 km)
- Existed: July 1, 1983–present

Major junctions
- South end: SR 57 in Rossville
- SR 193 in Macon; US 64 in Oakland
- North end: SR 59 near Braden

Location
- Country: United States
- State: Tennessee
- Counties: Fayette

Highway system
- Tennessee State Routes; Interstate; US; State
← SR 193	→ SR 195

State Route 194 (SR 194) is a 23.5-mile-long (37.8 km) north–south state highway in Fayette County, Tennessee, connecting Rossville with Braden via Macon and Oakland.

== Route description ==
SR 194 begins in Rossville at an intersection with SR 57. It heads north to pass through downtown along Church Street before leaving Rossville and crossing the Wolf River. The highway then travels northeast through farmland and rural areas as Rossville Road to pass through Macon, where it has a short concurrency with SR 193 (Macon Road). SR 194 then heads north as Oakland Road to enter Oakland, where it passes through subdivisions and downtown as Church Street to come to an intersection with U.S. Route 64 (US 64; in an unsigned concurrency with SR 15). It then passes through more subdivisions before leaving Oakland to cross the Loosahatchie River. The highway then comes to an end shortly thereafter at an intersection with SR 59, approximately halfway between Braden and Somerville. The entire route of SR 194 is a two-lane highway.

== Future ==
An extension of SR 194 is planned to serve Ford Motor Company's Blue Oval City manufacturing facility to the north, which will begin operation in 2025. The northern terminus will be with US 70 in Tipton County, and a new interchange on Interstate 40 will be constructed with the extension, numbered exit 39.

== Major intersections ==
County	Location	mi	km	Destinations	Notes
Fayette	Rossville	0.00	0.00	SR 57	Southern terminus
Fayette	Macon	9.0	14.5	SR 193 east	Southern end of SR 193 concurrency
Fayette	Macon	9.4	15.1	SR 193 west	Northern end of SR 193 concurrency
Fayette	Oakland	15.2	24.5	US 64 (SR 15) – Somerville, Memphis	
Fayette		23.5	37.8	SR 59	Current northern terminus
Fayette				I-40 – Memphis, Nashville	Future interchange; I-40 exit 39
Fayette–Haywood county line				SR 468 east (Blue Oval City Connector)	Proposed partial interchange; future western terminus of SR 468
Tipton				US 70 / US 79 (SR 1)	Future northern terminus
1.000 mi = 1.609 km; 1.000 km = 0.621 mi: Concurrency terminus; Unopened
