= Forty Five, Tennessee =

Unincorporated community in Tennessee, US

Coordinates: 35°03′26″N 89°18′32″W

Forty Five (also 'Forty-5' or just '45') is an unincorporated community located in southeastern Fayette County, Tennessee, United States. It shares a ZIP code of 38057 with Moscow, Tennessee. The center of the town lies at the junction of State Route 57 and Forty 5 Road. It is home to a Baptist church and shares several local businesses with neighboring areas.
