= Delta HRA Public Transit =

- Parent: Non-profit
- Founded: December 18, 1989
- Headquarters: 915 US Highway 51 south., Covington, Tennessee
- Locale: Tipton County, Tennessee
- Service area: Tipton, Fayette, Lauderdale and rural Shelby County, Tennessee
- Service type: Paratransit and rural intra-county van service
- Stops: on request by passenger
- Destinations: on request by passenger
- Fleet: buses, vans, paratransit vans
- Website: www.deltahra.org

Delta Human Resources Area Public Transportation (also known as Delta HRA Public Transit for short) is a non-profit transportation service that provides service between Tipton, Fayette, Lauderdale and rural Shelby County, Tennessee, whose region is collectively known as the "Delta Region." The service was formed on December 18, 1989 and charted as a non-profit on January 18, 1990 and is based in Covington, Tennessee and has satellite offices in Ripley, Tennessee and Oakland, Tennessee.

== Services ==
Delta HRA offers service to residents regardless of income and age, workers who need transportation to area jobs and employment, and disabled persons that need transportation to area hospitals or scheduled appointments. However, these trips must be scheduled in advance and have to be prompt prior to arrival. The services are available Monday through Friday from 6 a.m. to 6 p.m. There is no weekend or holiday services. The agency's fleet is made up of regular vans and cutaway van/buses.

Typical fares are $5.00 for in-county round trips, with an additional $3.50 for cross-county trips, and $.75 for additional stops. A $14.00 flat fee is set for passengers travelling to Memphis or Jackson but provide no transfers of any type to either Memphis Area Transit Authority or Jackson Transit Authority buses. Seniors 60 and older ride free with some exceptions.
