= WSTN =

Radio station in Somerville, Tennessee (1982–2006)

- Somerville, Tennessee; United States
- Broadcast area: Fayette County; Memphis, Tennessee
- Frequency: 1410 kHz

Programming
- Language: English

Ownership
- Owner: Family Worship Center Church, Inc.

History
- First air date: November 1982
- Last air date: October 25, 2006
- Former call signs: WJED (1981–1986)
- Call sign meaning: Somerville, Tennessee

Technical information
- Facility ID: 8062
- Class: B
- Power: 500 watts
- Transmitter coordinates: 35°14′31.3″N 89°19′3.3″W

WSTN (1410 AM) was an American radio station formerly licensed to serve Somerville, the county seat of Fayette County, Tennessee. The station was established in 1983 as WJED, and changed to WSTN in 1986. Since 2002 its broadcast license was held by Jimmy Swaggart's Family Worship Center Church, Inc. The station went silent on October 25, 2006.

== Programming ==
Before falling silent, WSTN broadcast a gospel music format to Fayette County and Memphis, Tennessee, as an affiliate of Jimmy Swaggart's SonLife Radio Network.

== History ==
=== Launch ===
In September 1979, Fayette County Broadcasting Company applied to the Federal Communications Commission (FCC) for a construction permit for a new class B broadcast radio station to operate with 500 watts of power on a frequency of 1410 kHz. The FCC granted this permit on June 19, 1981, with a scheduled expiration date of June 19, 1982. The new station was assigned call sign "WJED" on December 1, 1981. After construction and testing were completed, the station was granted its broadcast license on February 25, 1983.

=== WJED era ===
In May 1984, Fayette County Broadcasting Company applied to the FCC to transfer the WJED license to the similarly named Fayette County Broadcasting Company, Inc. The FCC approved the move on May 31, 1984, and the transaction was formally consummated on August 29, 1984. Almost immediately, Fayette County Broadcasting Company, Inc., made a deal to sell WJED to Floyd Broadcasting, Inc., but this request was ultimately dismissed on December 6, 1984, at the request of Floyd Broadcasting.

Fayette County Broadcasting Company, Inc., made another bid to sell the station in May 1986, this time to Fayette County Broadcasting Service. The FCC approved the deal on July 8, 1986, and the transaction was formally consummated on August 8, 1986. The new owners had the FCC assign the station new call sign "WSTN" on September 22, 1986.

=== WSTN era ===
In June 1989, Fayette County Broadcasting sold the station to C.I.T.A. Broadcasters, Inc. The sale received FCC approval on August 24, 1989, and the deal was formally consummated on October 23, 1989. In April 1995, C.I.T.A. Broadcasting, Inc., made a deal to transfer the WSTN broadcast license to Fayette County Broadcasting. The move was approved by the FCC on June 13, 1995, and consummated on August 21, 1995. In November 1996, Fayette County Broadcasting made a deal to sell WSTN to Patria Communications, Inc., but even though the deal gained FCC acceptance on March 12, 1997, the transaction was never consummated and control of WSTN remained with Fayette County Broadcasting.

On May 3, 2002, Fayette County Broadcasting's Pat Roberson signed a contract to sell WSTN and its assets to the Jimmy Swaggart-owned Family Worship Center Church, Inc., for a total of $50,000. As part of the deal, Family Worship Center Church immediately took over operation of the station under a local marketing agreement while the sale was pending. WSTN became an affiliate of Jimmy Swaggart's SonLife Radio Network. The FCC approved the sale on September 5, 2002, and the transaction was consummated on December 4, 2002.

=== Falling silent ===
WSTN went temporarily dark on October 25, 2006, after license holder Family Worship Center Church, Inc., got into a dispute with the leaseholder of the station's broadcast tower site that made it, in the licensee's words, "impossible to operate the radio station". The FCC granted the station special temporary authority to remain silent on October 30, 2006, with a scheduled expiration on January 30, 2007. In January 2007, the dispute was not resolved so the station requested an extension which was granted on January 18, 2007, with a new expiration date on April 30, 2007. In April 2007, the station reported that the dispute was not yet resolved and that they were seeking alternative transmitter sites in case no resolution could be reached. The FCC granted them an additional extension on May 1, 2007, with an expiration of August 1, 2007.

Normally, under the provisions of the Telecommunications Act of 1996, any broadcast station that fails to operate for more than twelve consecutive months is subject to automatic forfeiture and cancellation of their broadcast license. At the licensee's request, WSTN's license was cancelled on April 5, 2012.
