= Williston, Tennessee =

- City
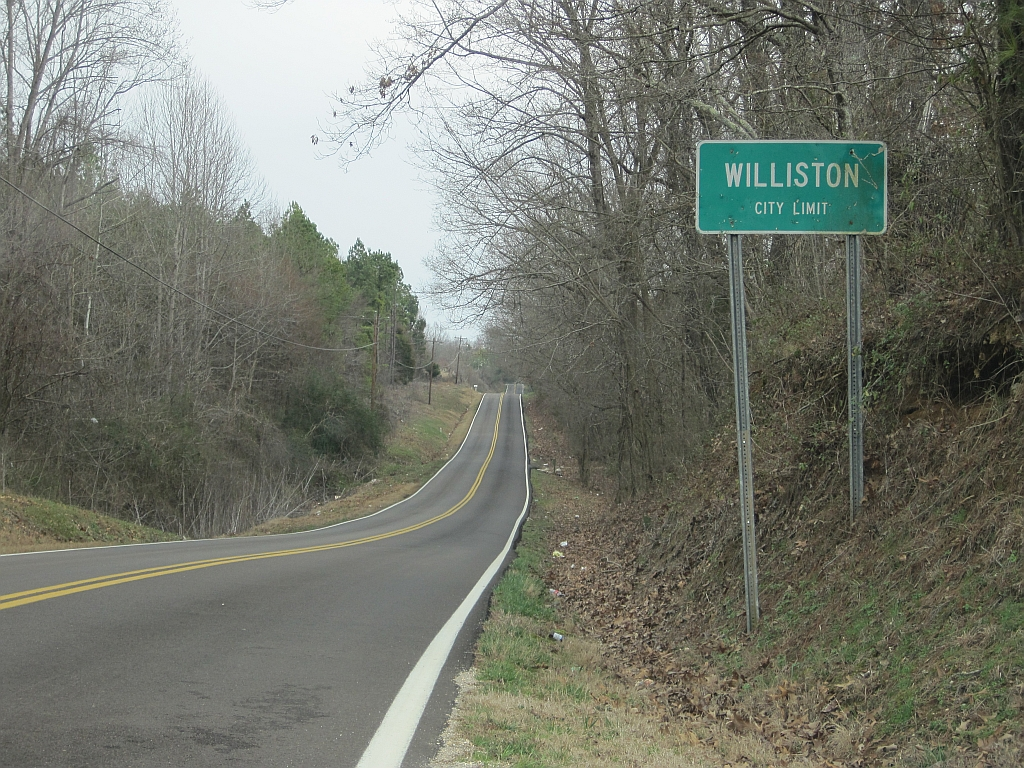
- Williston city limits

- Location of Williston in Fayette County, Tennessee.
- Coordinates: 35°9′32″N 89°22′24″W
- Country: United States
- State: Tennessee
- County: Fayette
- Incorporated: 1970
- Named for: Henry Willis, early resident

Area
  - Total: 1.65 sq mi (4.28 km^{2})
  - Land: 1.65 sq mi (4.28 km^{2})
  - Water: 0 sq mi (0.00 km^{2})
- Elevation: 502 ft (153 m)

Population (2020)
  - Total: 349
  - Density: 211.4/sq mi (81.63/km^{2})
- Time zone: UTC-6 (Central (CST))
  - Summer (DST): UTC-5 (CDT)
- ZIP code: 38076
- Area code: 901
- FIPS code: 47-81020
- GNIS feature ID: 1304614

Williston is a city in Fayette County, Tennessee, United States. As of the 2020 census, Williston had a population of 349.

== Geography ==
Williston is located south of the center of Fayette County at 35°9′32″N 89°22′24″W (35.158955, -89.373328). According to the United States Census Bureau, the city has a total area of 1.6 square miles (4.2 km^{2}), all land.

The city is located along Tennessee State Routes 76 and 193. TN 76 leads north 6 miles (10 km) to Somerville, the county seat, and south 7 miles (11 km) to Moscow. TN 193 leads west 7 miles (11 km) to Macon and 15 miles (24 km) to the Memphis outer beltway.

== Demographics ==
Historical population
Census	Pop.	Note	%±
1880	135		—
1980	395		—
1990	427		8.1%
2000	341		−20.1%
2010	395		15.8%
2020	349		−11.6%

=== 2020 census ===
As of the 2020 census, Williston had a population of 349. The median age was 43.4 years. 20.6% of residents were under the age of 18 and 19.8% of residents were 65 years of age or older. For every 100 females there were 105.3 males, and for every 100 females age 18 and over there were 97.9 males age 18 and over.

0.0% of residents lived in urban areas, while 100.0% lived in rural areas.

There were 141 households in Williston, of which 29.1% had children under the age of 18 living in them. Of all households, 46.8% were married-couple households, 19.9% were households with a male householder and no spouse or partner present, and 30.5% were households with a female householder and no spouse or partner present. About 30.5% of all households were made up of individuals and 12.7% had someone living alone who was 65 years of age or older.

There were 154 housing units, of which 8.4% were vacant. The homeowner vacancy rate was 4.3% and the rental vacancy rate was 6.1%.

Racial composition as of the 2020 census
Race	Number	Percent
White	219	62.8%
Black or African American	113	32.4%
American Indian and Alaska Native	3	0.9%
Asian	0	0.0%
Native Hawaiian and Other Pacific Islander	1	0.3%
Some other race	1	0.3%
Two or more races	12	3.4%
Hispanic or Latino (of any race)	6	1.7%

=== 2000 census ===
As of the census of 2000, there was a population of 341, with 122 households and 91 families residing in the city. The population density was 210.7 inhabitants per square mile (81.4/km^{2}). There were 129 housing units at an average density of 79.7 per square mile (30.8/km^{2}). The racial makeup of the city was 64.81% White, 33.43% African American, 0.59% Asian, 0.59% from other races, and 0.59% from two or more races. Hispanic or Latino of any race were 0.29% of the population.

There were 122 households, out of which 38.5% had children under the age of 18 living with them, 54.9% were married couples living together, 18.0% had a female householder with no husband present, and 24.6% were non-families. 20.5% of all households were made up of individuals, and 8.2% had someone living alone who was 65 years of age or older. The average household size was 2.80 and the average family size was 3.28.

In the city, the population was spread out, with 30.5% under the age of 18, 8.2% from 18 to 24, 29.0% from 25 to 44, 21.1% from 45 to 64, and 11.1% who were 65 years of age or older. The median age was 36 years. For every 100 females, there were 78.5 males. For every 100 females age 18 and over, there were 74.3 males.

The median income for a household in the city was $40,625, and the median income for a family was $43,750. Males had a median income of $30,729 versus $26,719 for females. The per capita income for the city was $14,514. About 8.6% of families and 9.7% of the population were below the poverty line, including 7.1% of those under age 18 and 16.7% of those age 65 or over.

== Notable people ==
- Robert K. Crane (1919–2010). Biochemist known for his discovery of sodium-glucose cotransport. Died in Williston

== Gallery ==
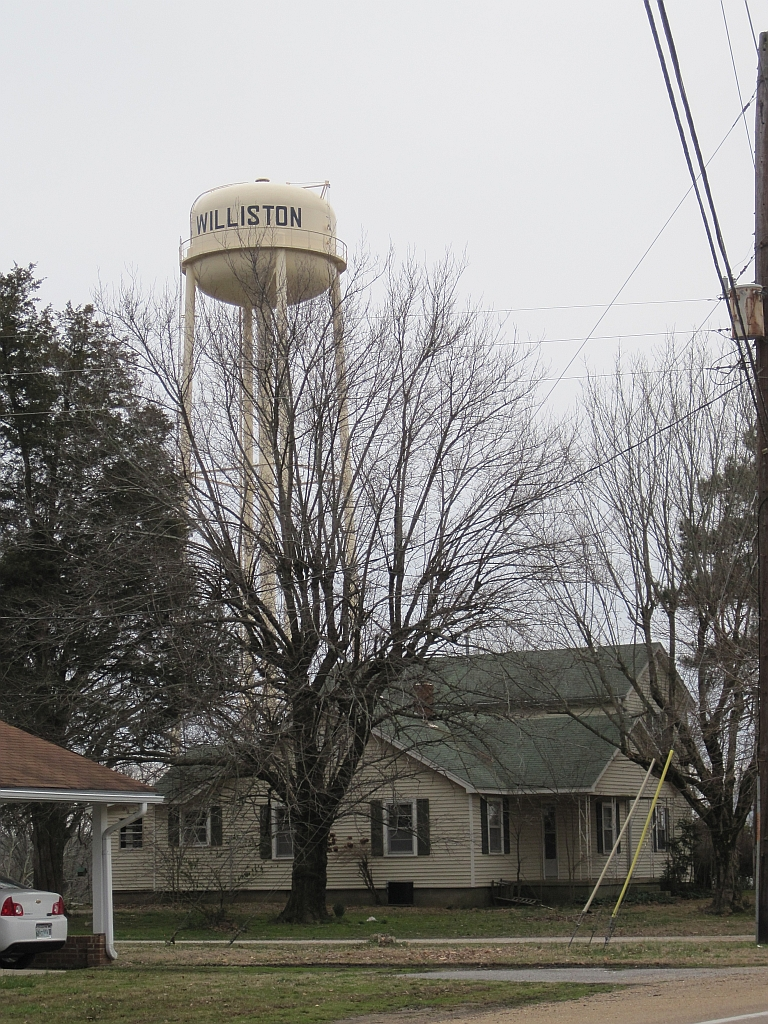

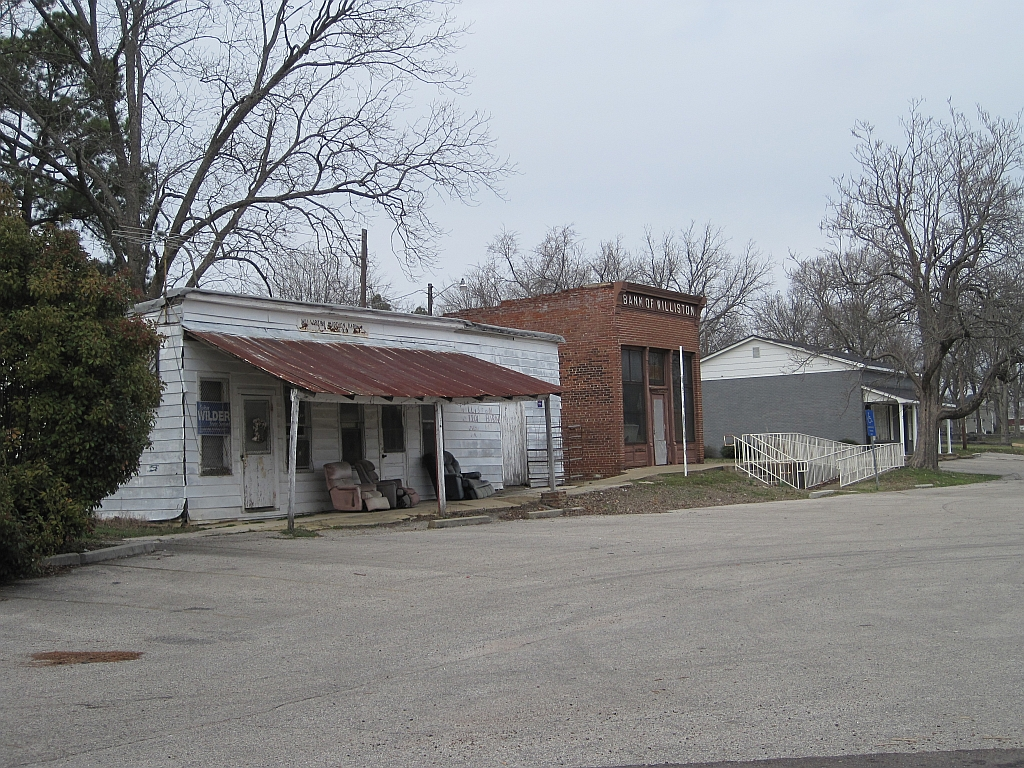

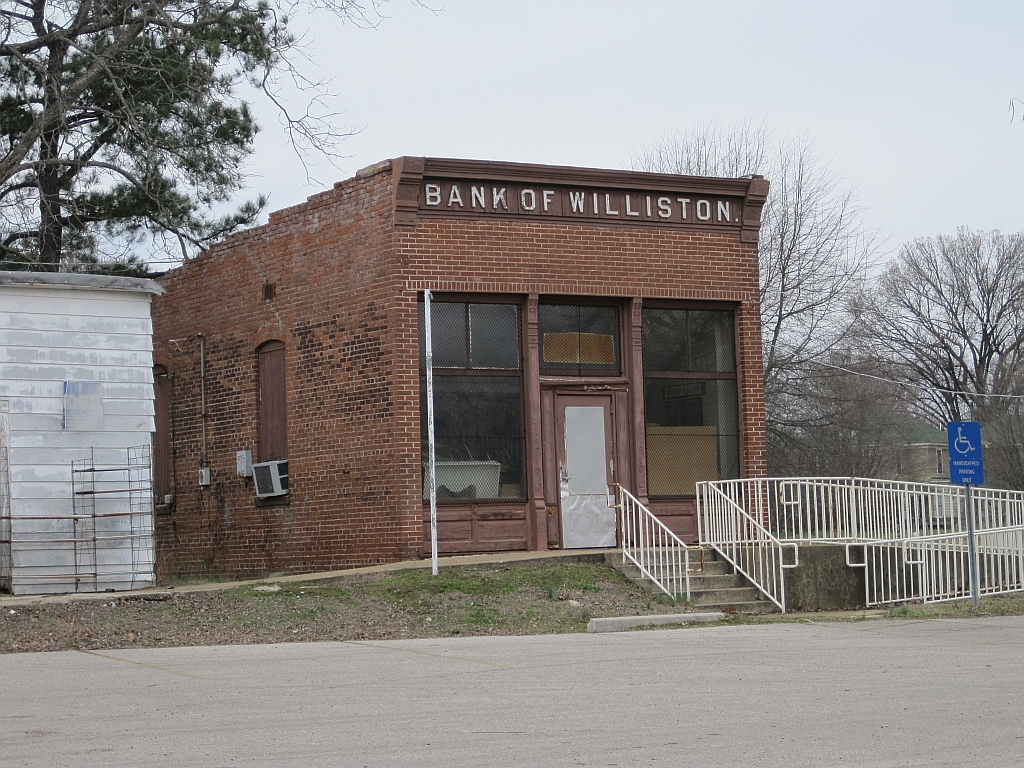

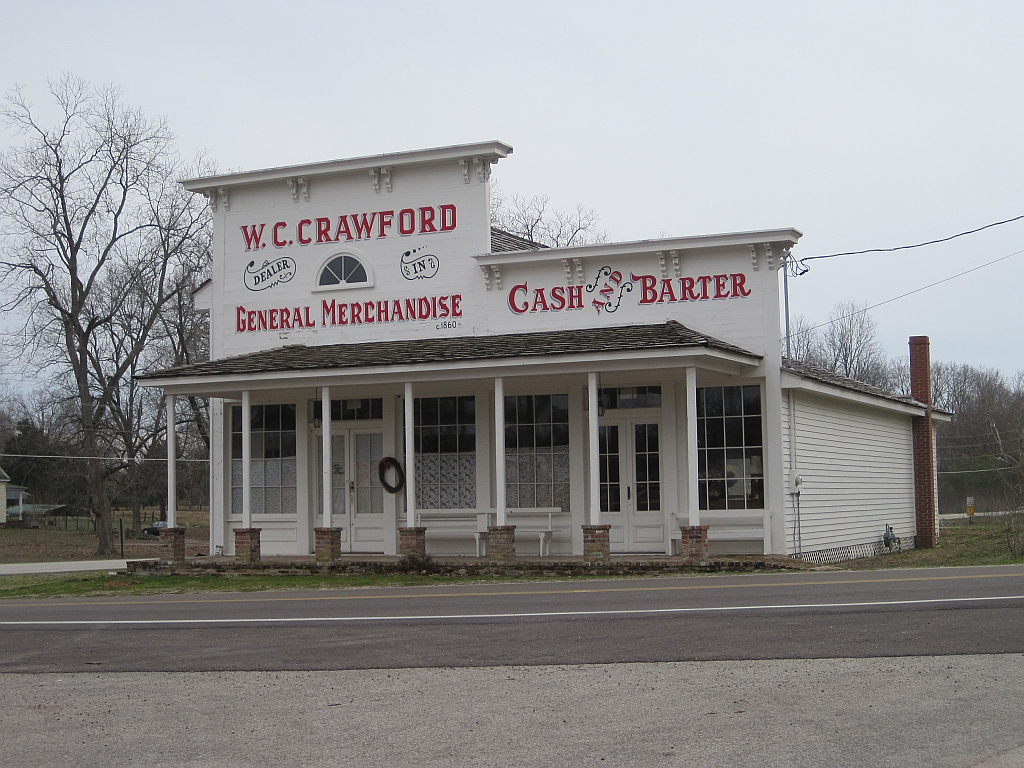

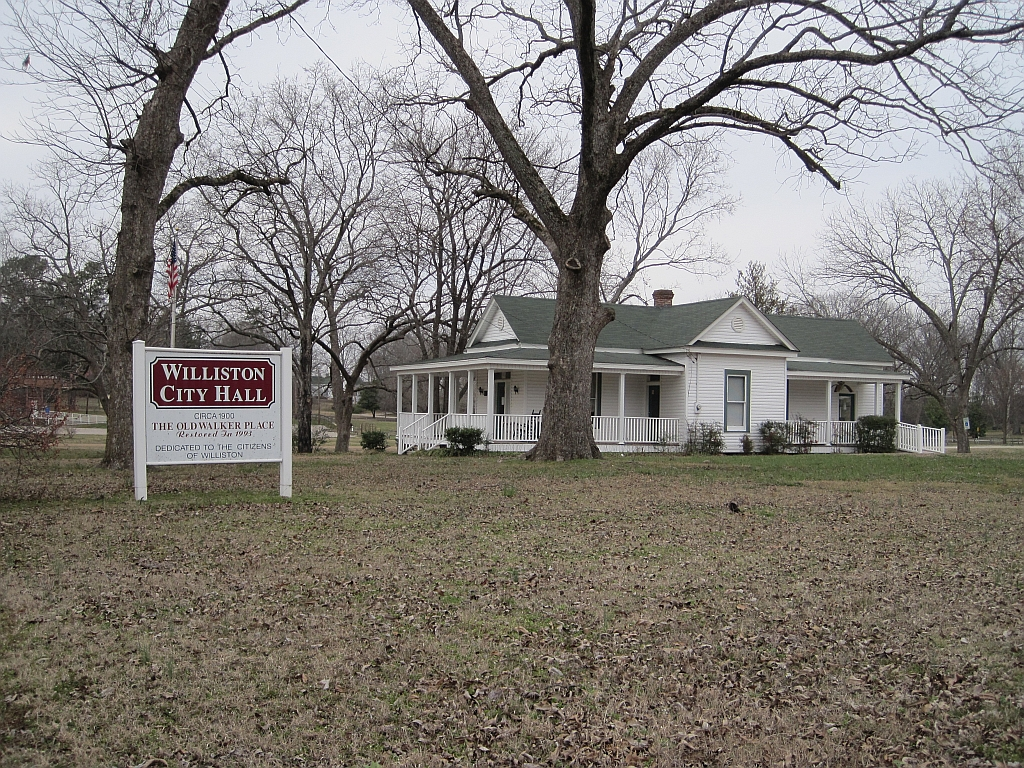

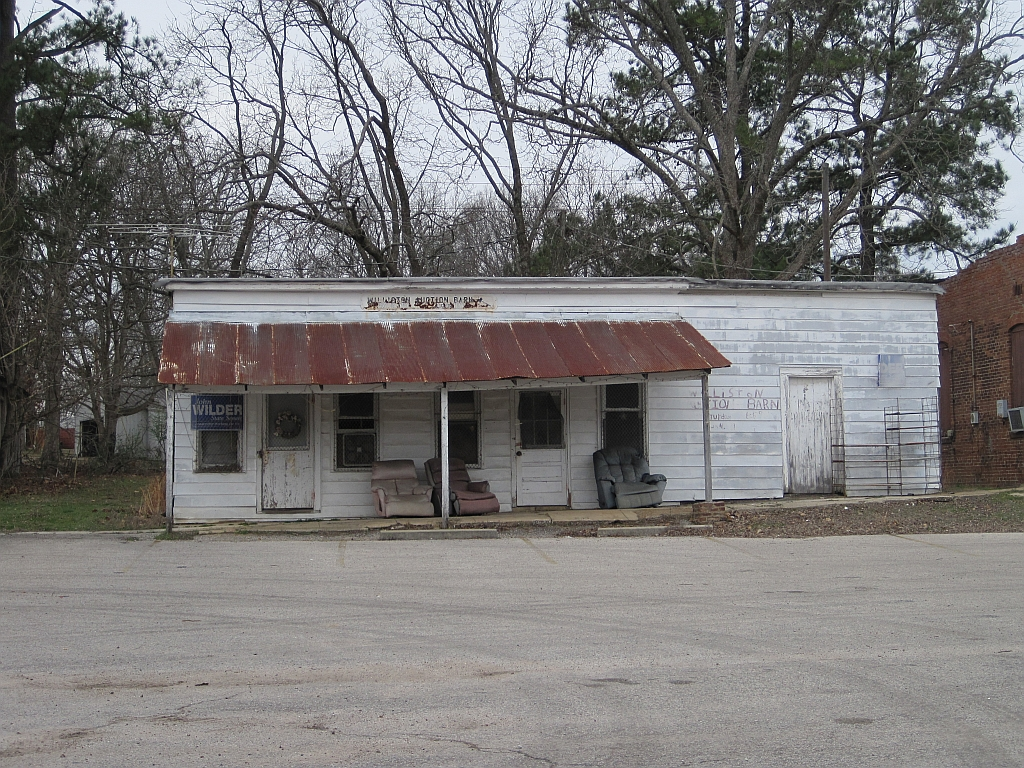
