= William B. Dortch =

American lawyer and politician

William Baskerville Dortch (August 10, 1828 - March 10, 1882) was an American lawyer and politician from Fayette County, Tennessee who served two consecutive terms from 1853-1856 as a member of the Tennessee House of Representatives from Fayette County.

Dortch was born in North Carolina, and graduated from the University of North Carolina at Chapel Hill in 1849 (an 1846 letter of his to James Johnston Pettigrew is now preserved at the University) He became a lawyer and lived in La Grange, Tennessee. He served as a major in the Confederate Army.

He died in 1882 and is buried in Somerville, Tennessee.

His son, J. H. Dortch, would later serve in the Tennessee Senate.
