= Zu Zu, Tennessee =

Unincorporated community in United States

- Unincorporated community
- Location within Tennessee Location within the United States
- Coordinates: 35°23′25″N 89°21′24″W
- Country: United States
- State: Tennessee
- County: Fayette
- Elevation: 351 ft (107 m)
- Time zone: UTC–6 (Central (CST))
  - Summer (DST): UTC–5 (CDT)
- GNIS feature ID: 1647508

Zu Zu is an unincorporated community in Fayette County, Tennessee, United States. It was also called Fowlers Store. Zu Zu is 11 miles north of Somerville, 8 miles from Blue Oval City, and 3 miles north of Yum Yum.
