= Yum Yum, Tennessee =

- Unincorporated community
- Location within Tennessee Location within the United States
- Coordinates: 35°20′43″N 89°21′50″W
- Country: United States
- State: Tennessee
- County: Fayette
- Elevation: 427 ft (130 m)
- Time zone: UTC-6 (Central (CST))
  - Summer (DST): UTC-5 (CDT)
- ZIP Codes: 38068, 38069
- Area code: 901
- GNIS feature ID: 1304716

Yum Yum is an unincorporated community in Fayette County, Tennessee, United States. It lies 7 miles north of the town of Somerville and 3 miles south of Zu Zu. Yum Yum is only around 12 miles from the Tennessee Truck Assembly project, which is expected to enter operation in 2029 and create about 2,300 jobs.

== History ==
The community derives its name from a 19th-century brand of candy. Local tradition states that the community was named when U.S. Senator Kenneth McKellar asked storekeeper John J. Garnett what to name the new post office and Garnett answered, "Just call it Yum Yum. There won't be another name like that."
