= Liberty Hill, Fayette County, Tennessee =

Liberty Hill, Tennessee
- Unincorporated community
- Location within Tennessee Location within the United States
- Coordinates: 35°18′08″N 89°16′51″W
- Country: United States
- State: Tennessee
- County: Fayette
- Elevation: 456 ft (139 m)
- Time zone: UTC-6 (Central (CST))
  - Summer (DST): UTC-5 (CDT)
- Area code: 901
- GNIS feature ID: 1315391

Liberty Hill is an unincorporated community in Fayette County, Tennessee, United States. Liberty Hill is 5.6 miles (9.0 km) northeast of Somerville.
