= Lendley Black =

American academic

Lendley C. Black

9th Chancellor of the University of Minnesota Duluth
- In office August 2010 – 2021

Personal details
- Born: March 21, 1952 (age 74) Somerville, Tennessee
- Spouse: Connie Black
- Children: 3
- Education: University of Tennessee Martin; University of Connecticut; University of Kansas
- Profession: Chancellor
- Institutions: Emporia State University; Kennesaw State University; University of Minnesota Duluth
- Website: Profile, StarTribune.com. Accessed March 23, 2024.

Lendley C. Black (born March 21, 1952) is an American educator, author, and academic administrator, who served as Chancellor of the University of Minnesota Duluth from 2010 until his retirement in 2021.

== Education ==
Born in Somerville, Tennessee and raised in Memphis, Tennessee, Black has a Bachelor of Arts degree in English from the University of Tennessee at Martin and a Master of Arts degree in theatre from the University of Connecticut. He earned his Ph.D. in theatre at the University of Kansas.

== Career ==
Black began his tenure as Chancellor of the University of Minnesota Duluth on August 1, 2010. Before becoming Chancellor at UMD, he worked for Kennesaw State University in Kennesaw, Georgia, where he served as vice president for academic affairs from 2002 until he was promoted to provost and vice president for academic affairs in 2006.

He has a record of senior administrative experience, including nine years as dean of the College of Liberal Arts and Sciences, three years as director of undergraduate studies, and three years as director of student advising at Emporia State University in Emporia, Kansas.

His teaching interests include directing, theatre performance, theatre history, dramatic literature, theatre appreciation and fine arts. Black's primary research area is Russian theatre and drama. He wrote a biography about Michael Chekhov and has continued to direct and perform in university theatre productions throughout his administrative career.

== Leadership activities ==
Black currently serves on the board of directors for Zeitgeist Center for Arts and Community, Renegade Theatre Company, and APEX (Area Partnerships for Economic Expansion). He previously served on the Duluth Chamber of Commerce board.

== Personal life ==
He is married to Connie Black, and they have three grown children.
