= Mebane-Nuckolls House =

- U.S. National Register of Historic Places
- Location within Tennessee Location within the United States
- Location: Macon-Collierville Rd., near Macon, Tennessee
- Coordinates: 35°08′06″N 89°32′46″W
- Area: 15 acres (6.1 ha)
- Built: c.1855
- Architectural style: Italianate
- NRHP reference No.: 85002910
- Added to NRHP: November 20, 1985

The Mebane-Nuckolls House, on the Macon-Collierville Rd. near Macon, Tennessee, was built in about 1855. It was listed on the National Register of Historic Places in 1985. The listing included four contributing buildings and two contributing sites.

Also known as Nuckolls House, the main building is an Italianate-style building. The other historic resources are an "original frame kitchen, a nineteenth century frame smokehouse, a nineteenth century log barn, the Mebane cemetery, and the Starkey Hare cemetery (an early settler of Fayette County and the original owner of the surrounding land.)"
