= Fayette County Airport (Tennessee) =

- IATA: none; ICAO: KFYE; FAA LID: FYE

Summary
- Airport type: Public
- Owner: Fayette County
- Serves: Somerville, Tennessee
- Elevation AMSL: 436 ft (133 m)
- Coordinates: 35°12′28″N 089°23′40″W

Map
- Location of airport in Tennessee KFYE (the United States)

Runways
Direction	Length		Surface
Direction	ft	m	Surface
1/19	5,000	1,524	Asphalt

Statistics (2019)
- Aircraft operations (year ending 6/30/2019): 10,016
- Based aircraft: 43
- Source: Federal Aviation Administration

Fayette County Airport (ICAO: KFYE, FAA LID: FYE) is a county-owned, public-use airport located two nautical miles (3.7 km) southwest of the central business district of Somerville, in Fayette County, Tennessee, United States. According to the FAA's National Plan of Integrated Airport Systems for 2009–2013, it was classified as a general aviation airport.

Although most U.S. airports use the same three-letter location identifier for the FAA and IATA, this airport is assigned FYE by the FAA but has no designation from the IATA.

== Facilities and aircraft ==
Fayette County Airport covers an area of 138 acres (56 ha) at an elevation of 436 feet (133 m) above mean sea level. It has one runway designated 1/19 with an asphalt surface measuring 5,000 by 75 feet (1,524 x 23 m).

For the 12-month period ending June 30, 2019, the airport had 10,016 aircraft operations, an average of 27 per day: 99% general aviation, <1% air taxi, and <1% military. At that time there were 43 aircraft based at this airport: 39 single-engine and 4 multi-engine.

== See also ==
- List of airports in Tennessee
