= Herb Parsons Lake =

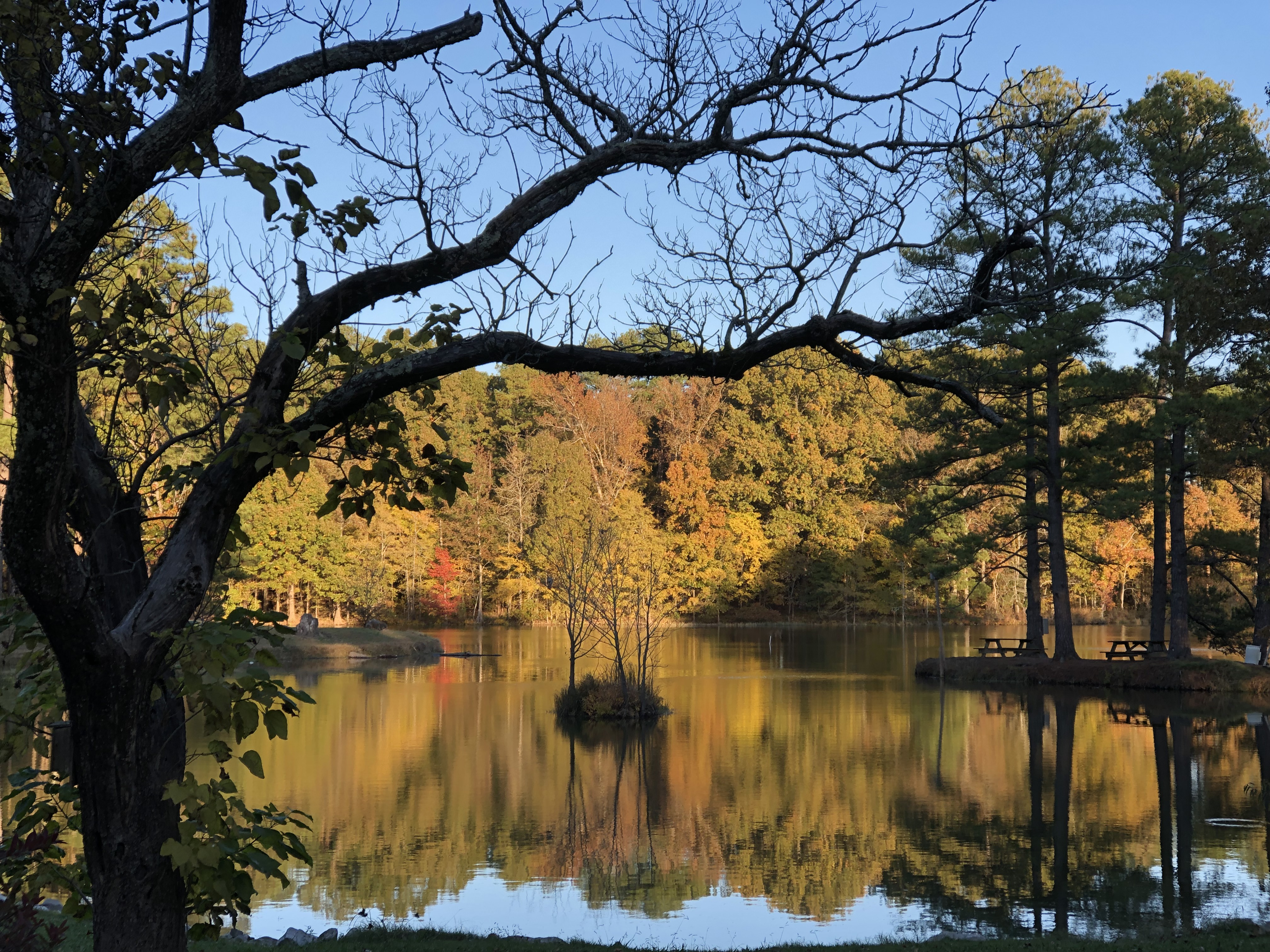
- Herb Parsons Lake in autumn

- Location within Tennessee Location within the United States
- Location: Fayette County, Tennessee, United States
- Coordinates: 35.1336°N 89.6211°W
- Type: Reservoir
- Basin countries: United States
- Max. length: 4,950 feet (1,510 m)
- Max. width: 2,400 feet (730 m)
- Surface area: 177 acres (72 ha)
- Surface elevation: 384 ft (117 m)

Herb Parsons Lake is a reservoir lake located in Fayette County, Tennessee near the town of Collierville in neighboring Shelby County. It is owned and operated by the Tennessee Wildlife Resources Agency, and is named after Herb Parsons, a famed exhibition shooter from the county. The lake is known primarily for its fishing, hiking and bicycle trails, and wildlife. Its facilities include a boat launching ramp, fish attractors, handicapped accessible fishing pier, bait and tackle, rental boats, and concessions.

== History ==
Herb Parsons Lake, originally known as Fisherville Lake after nearby Fisherville, was opened to the public on July 1, 1954. It was built as a reservoir by the Tennessee Game and Fish Commission of the Tennessee Wildlife Resources Agency in the early 1950s. After Herb Parsons, a renowned local exhibition shooter, died in 1959, the Commission moved to rename the lake in his honor. The change was made official on July 26, 1964.

== Features ==
=== Fish and wildlife ===
The array of fish of Herb Parsons Lake includes largemouth bass, bluegill, crappie, and redear sunfish, as well as blue, channel and bullhead catfish. The most commonly caught of these are the largemouth bass, blue catfish, and channel catfish, although most of the fishing pressure is directed toward largemouth bass alone. A cove on the southern side of the lake is home to beaver dams.

=== Trails ===
Multiple, sometimes overlapping trails encircle Herb Parsons Lake. A bike trail of hard-packed silt and clay stretches through the woods for 9.7 miles. A shorter walking trail of seven miles features signs that denote the species of trees around the lake.
