= Stephen Tall (writer) =

American novelist

- Born: Compton Newby Crook; June 14, 1908; Rossville, Tennessee
- Died: January 15, 1981 (aged 72); Phoenix, Maryland
- Occupation: Author
- Writing career
- Pen name: Stephen Tall
- Genre: Science fiction

Stephen Tall was the most common pseudonym of American science fiction writer Compton Newby Crook (June 14, 1908 – January 15, 1981).

== Biography ==
Born in Rossville, Tennessee, Crook studied biology at Peabody College, and did graduate work at Arizona State University and Johns Hopkins University. He began teaching biology at Towson University in 1939, where he remained until his retirement in 1973. He was married to writer Beverly Crook and had three children with her. He died in Phoenix, Maryland.

Crook's first published story was a winner in the Boy Scouts of America's first short story writing contest. He began publishing science fiction in 1955 with the appearance of "The Lights on Precipice Peak" in Galaxy. His short story "The Bear with the Knot on His Tail" (1971) was nominated for the 1972 Hugo Award for short fiction. His activity in the field grew in the mid-1970s before his death.

In 1983, the Compton Crook/Stephen Tall Memorial Award was established by the Baltimore Science Fiction Society in his name for best first science fiction novel in a given year.

== Bibliography ==
=== Stardust series ===
1. The Stardust Voyages (collection, 1975)
2. The Ramsgate Paradox (novel, 1976)

=== Novels ===
- The People Beyond the Wall (1980)

=== Short stories ===
- "The Lights on Precipice Peak" (1955)
- "A Star Called Cyrene" (aka "Seventy Light-Years from Sol") (1966)
- "The Angry Mountain" (1970)
- "Talk with the Animals" (1970)
- "Allison, Carmichael and Tattersall" (1970)
- "The Mad Scientist and The FBI" (1970)
- "Birds Fly South in Winter" (1971)
- "This is My Country" (1971)
- "The Bear with the Knot on His Tail" (1971)
- "The Gods on Olympus" (1972)
- "The Invaders" (1973)
- "Space Bounce" (1973)
- "Mushroom World" (1974)
- "Chlorophyll" (1976)
- "The Rock and the Pool"" (1976)
- "The Man Who Saved the Sun (1977)
- "The King is Dead. Long Live the Queen!" (1978)
- "Home is the Hunter" (1979)
- "The Hot and Cold Running Waterfall" (1980)
- "The Merry Men of Methane" (1980)
