= Rossville, Tennessee =

Rossville
- Town
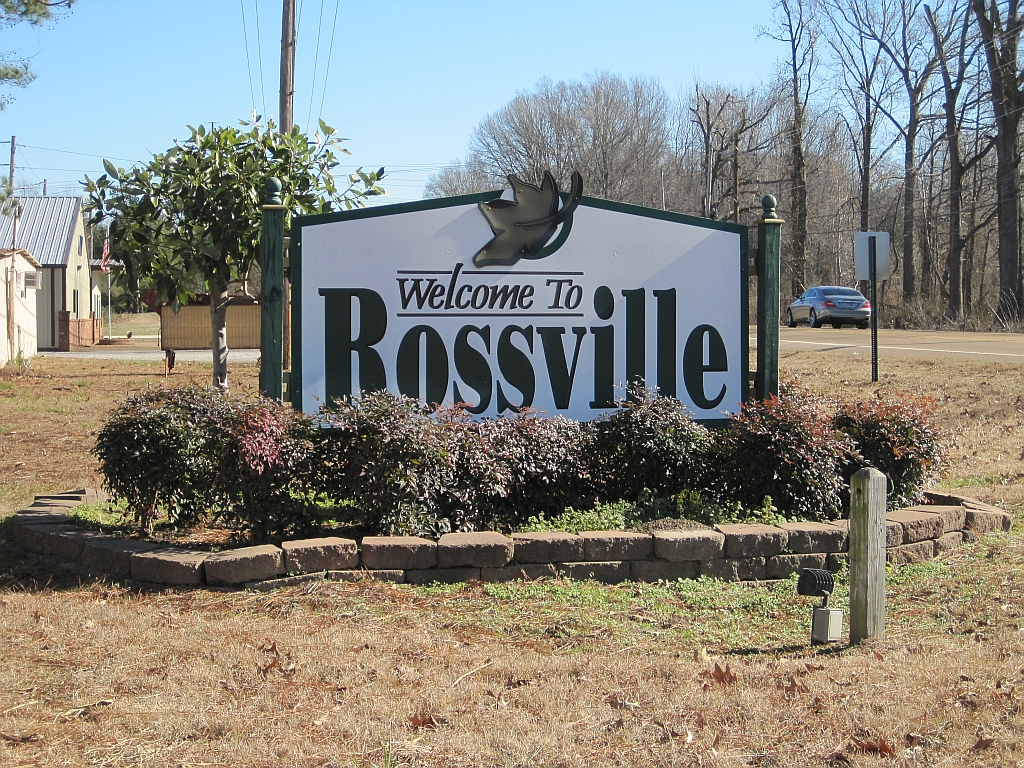
- The welcome sign in Rossville

- Location of Rossville in Fayette County, Tennessee.
- Coordinates: 35°2′38″N 89°32′35″W
- Country: United States
- State: Tennessee
- County: Fayette

Area
  - Total: 5.51 sq mi (14.27 km^{2})
  - Land: 5.45 sq mi (14.12 km^{2})
  - Water: 0.058 sq mi (0.15 km^{2})
- Elevation: 312 ft (95 m)

Population (2020)
  - Total: 1,041
  - Density: 191.0/sq mi (73.74/km^{2})
- Time zone: UTC-6 (Central (CST))
  - Summer (DST): UTC-5 (CDT)
- ZIP code: 38066
- Area code: 901
- FIPS code: 47-65240
- GNIS feature ID: 1300138
- Website: www.townofrossville.com

Rossville is a town in Fayette County, Tennessee, United States. The population was 1,041 at the 2020 census, up from 664 at the 2010 census.

== Geography ==
Rossville is located in southwestern Fayette County at 35°2′38″N 89°32′35″W (35.043935, -89.542931). It is bordered to the west by the city of Piperton and to the south by Marshall County, Mississippi.

According to the United States Census Bureau, the town has a total area of 1.8 square miles (4.7 km^{2}), of which 1.7 square miles (4.4 km^{2}) is land and 0.1 square miles (0.26 km^{2}) (2.82%) is water. The Wolf River, a tributary of the Mississippi River, flows to the west along the northern edge of the town.

=== Major thoroughfares ===
- State Route 57 is the main highway through the town, leading east 8 miles (13 km) to Moscow and west through Piperton 7 miles (11 km) to Collierville. Downtown Memphis is 30 miles (48 km) to the west.
- State Route 194 (Main Street) runs north from TN 57 through the oldest part of Rossville, then leads north 15 miles (24 km) to Oakland.

Rossville sits along the Norfolk Southern Railway. An intermodal facility was built southwest of the town and opened in 2012.

== Government ==
The town is governed by the Board of Mayor and Alderman, containing the mayor, the vice mayor and five aldermen/alderwomen. The Board of Mayor and Alderman also constitutes the Town of Rossville Beer Board.

Other elected commissions are:

- The Planning Commission and Design Review Board for the Town of Rossville
- The Town of Rossville Board of Zoning Appeals

The City Hall is led by the Town Recorder and the Utility Administrator.

Other agencies of the town government are:

- The Police Department has five full-time sworn officers and four part-time sworn officers.
- The Fire Department is a volunteer fire department that services the town and the area of Rossville outside the town limits. It has a First Respond Team.
- The Building and Codes Department is in charge of code enforcement.
- The Municipal Court adjudges cases concerning violations of the Municipal Code of Rossville. The Town Recorder and the Utility Manager are clerks of the court.

== Demographics ==
Historical population
Census	Pop.	Note	%±
1880	126		—
1910	142		—
1920	171		20.4%
1930	167		−2.3%
1940	190		13.8%
1950	175		−7.9%
1960	183		4.6%
1970	410		124.0%
1980	379		−7.6%
1990	291		−23.2%
2000	380		30.6%
2010	664		74.7%
2020	1,041		56.8%

As of the census of 2010, there were 664 people, 275 households, and 196 families residing in the town. The population density was 220.6 inhabitants per square mile (85.2/km^{2}). There were 182 housing units at an average density of 105.6 per square mile (40.8/km^{2}). The racial makeup of the town was 72.37% White, 25.00% African American, 0.53% Native American, and 2.11% from two or more races. Hispanic or Latino of any race were 0.53% of the population.

There were 164 households, out of which 28.0% had children under the age of 18 living with them, 54.3% were married couples living together, 8.5% had a female householder with no husband present, and 36.6% were non-families. 34.8% of all households were made up of individuals, and 17.1% had someone living alone who was 65 years of age or older. The average household size was 2.32 and the average family size was 2.99.

In the town, the population was spread out, with 23.7% under the age of 18, 5.3% from 18 to 24, 33.9% from 25 to 44, 21.8% from 45 to 64, and 15.3% who were 65 years of age or older. The median age was 35 years. For every 100 females, there were 89.1 males. For every 100 females age 18 and over, there were 77.9 males.

The median income for a household in the town was $33,333, and the median income for a family was $48,929. Males had a median income of $33,036 versus $25,781 for females. The per capita income for the town was $17,735. About 8.9% of families and 12.1% of the population were below the poverty line, including 9.0% of those under age 18 and 12.2% of those age 65 or over.

== Notable people ==
Compton Newby Crook, who wrote science fiction under the pseudonym Stephen Tall, was born in Rossville.

Delta Blues legend and master of the bottleneck guitar Mississippi Fred McDowell was born here before moving to Mississippi.

== Gallery ==
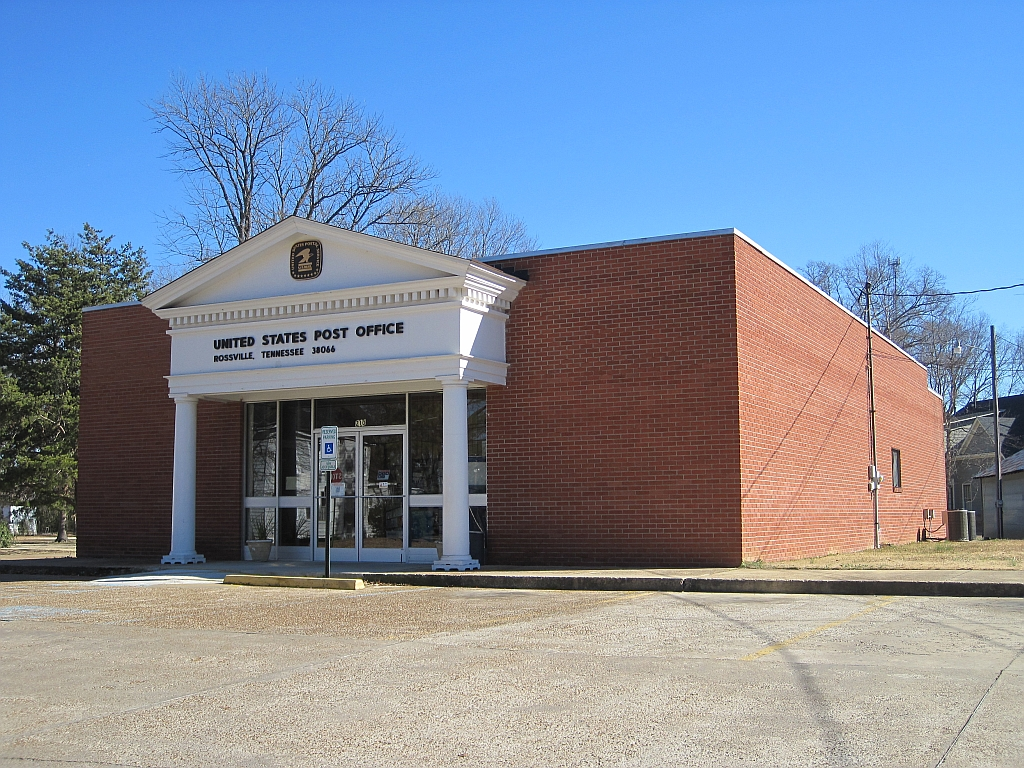

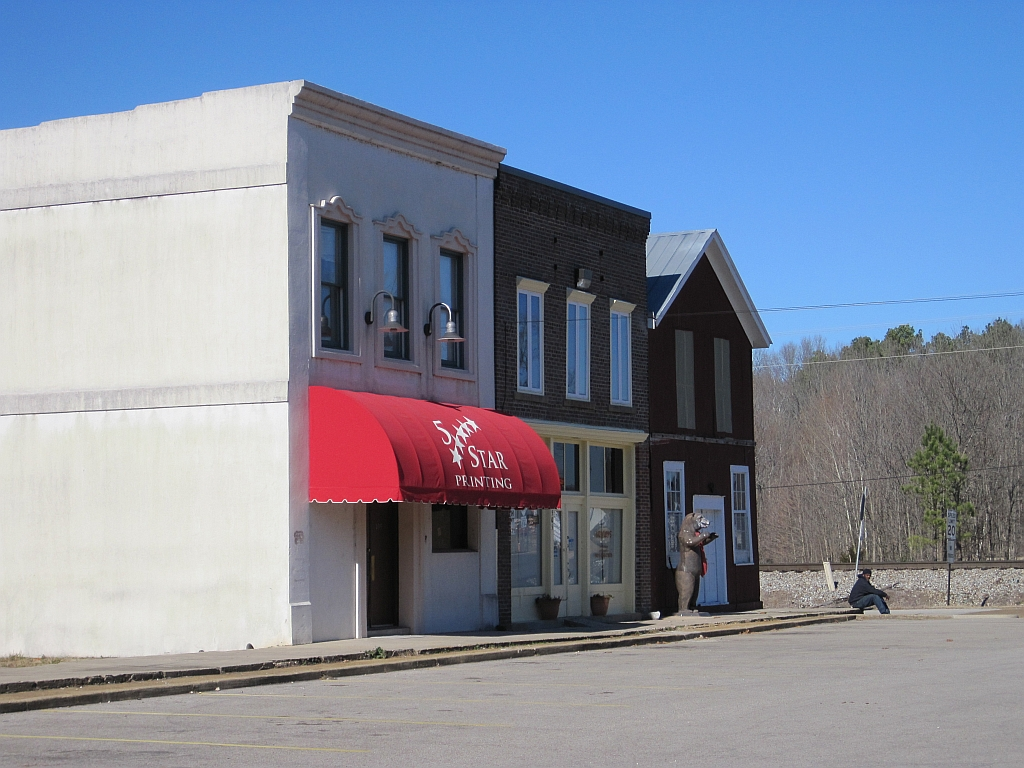

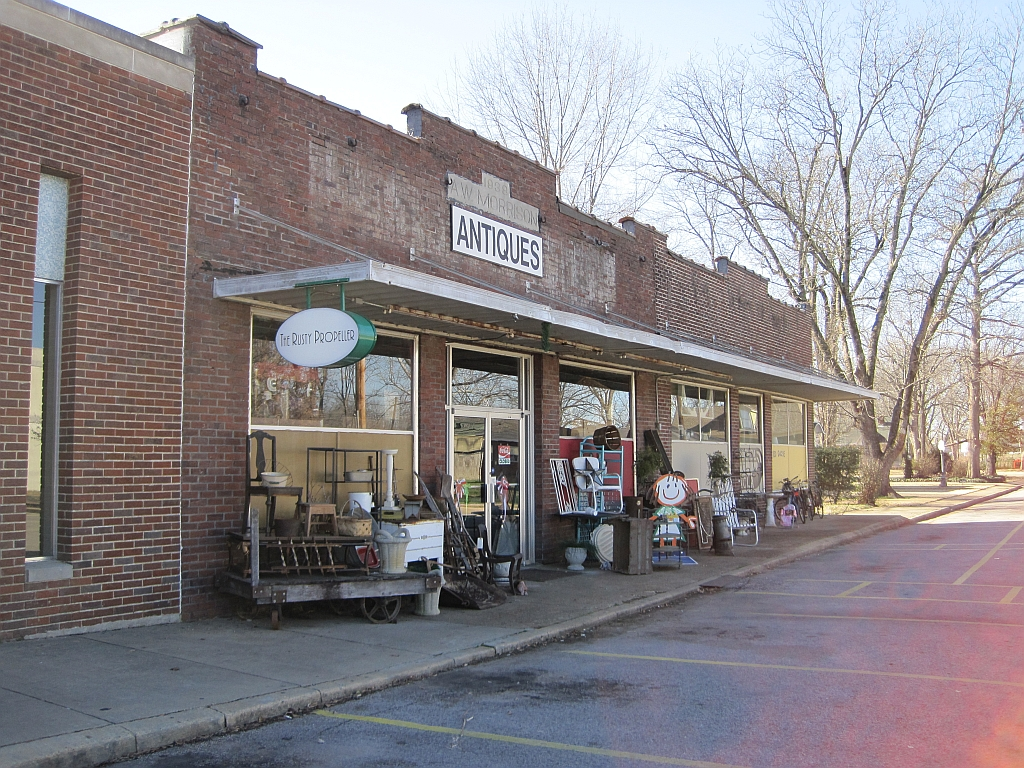
