= Braden, Tennessee =

- Town
- Location of Braden in Fayette County, Tennessee.
- Coordinates: 35°22′30″N 89°34′30″W
- Country: United States
- State: Tennessee
- County: Fayette

Area
  - Total: 3.68 sq mi (9.52 km^{2})
  - Land: 3.68 sq mi (9.52 km^{2})
  - Water: 0 sq mi (0.00 km^{2})
- Elevation: 315 ft (96 m)

Population (2020)
  - Total: 255
  - Density: 69.4/sq mi (26.79/km^{2})
- Time zone: UTC-6 (Central (CST))
  - Summer (DST): UTC-5 (CDT)
- ZIP code: 38010
- Area code: 901
- FIPS code: 47-07840
- GNIS feature ID: 1305377

Braden is a town in Fayette County, Tennessee. As of the 2020 census, Braden had a population of 255. The town is named after Joseph P. Braden.

== History ==
Braden was founded in 1850 as a depot on the Louisville and Nashville Railroad.

== Geography ==
Braden is located at 35°22′30″N 89°34′30″W (35.374867, -89.574942).

According to the United States Census Bureau, the town has a total area of 3.8 square miles (9.8 km^{2}), all land.

== Demographics ==
Historical population
Census	Pop.	Note	%±
1880	77		—
1980	293		—
1990	354		20.8%
2000	271		−23.4%
2010	282		4.1%
2020	255		−9.6%

As of the census of 2000, there were 271 people, 104 households, and 79 families residing in the town. The population density was 71.2 inhabitants per square mile (27.5/km^{2}). There were 109 housing units at an average density of 28.6 per square mile (11.0/km^{2}). The racial makeup of the town was 91.14% White, 7.01% Black or African American, 0.37% Native American, and 1.48% from two or more races. Hispanic or Latino of any race were 0.37% of the population.

There were 104 households, out of which 31.7% had children under the age of 18 living with them, 66.3% were married couples living together, 7.7% had a female householder with no husband present, and 24.0% were non-families. 16.3% of all households were made up of individuals, and 4.8% had someone living alone who was 65 years of age or older. The average household size was 2.61 and the average family size was 2.97.

In the town, the population was spread out, with 22.5% under the age of 18, 7.7% from 18 to 24, 33.9% from 25 to 44, 28.0% from 45 to 64, and 7.7% who were 65 years of age or older. The median age was 37 years. For every 100 females, there were 103.8 males. For every 100 females age 18 and over, there were 103.9 males.

The median income for a household in the town was $48,333, and the median income for a family was $51,750. Males had a median income of $35,625 versus $30,000 for females. The per capita income for the town was $19,610. About 4.9% of families and 7.0% of the population were below the poverty line, including 10.3% of those under the age of eighteen and none of those 65 or over.
