= Macon, Tennessee =

- Unincorporated community
- Location within Tennessee Location within the United States
- Coordinates: 35°09′11″N 89°29′23″W
- Country: United States
- State: Tennessee
- County: Fayette
- Elevation: 404 ft (123 m)
- Time zone: UTC-6 (Central (CST))
  - Summer (DST): UTC-5 (CDT)
- ZIP code: 38048
- Area code: 901
- GNIS feature ID: 1292459

Macon is an unincorporated community in Fayette County, Tennessee, United States. The community is located at the intersection of two state highways, State Route 193 (Macon Road) and State Route 194 (Oakland Road going north and Rossville Road going south). Its ZIP Code is 38048.

The Mebane-Nuckolls House in Macon is listed on the National Register of Historic Places.
