= Oakland, Tennessee =

- Town
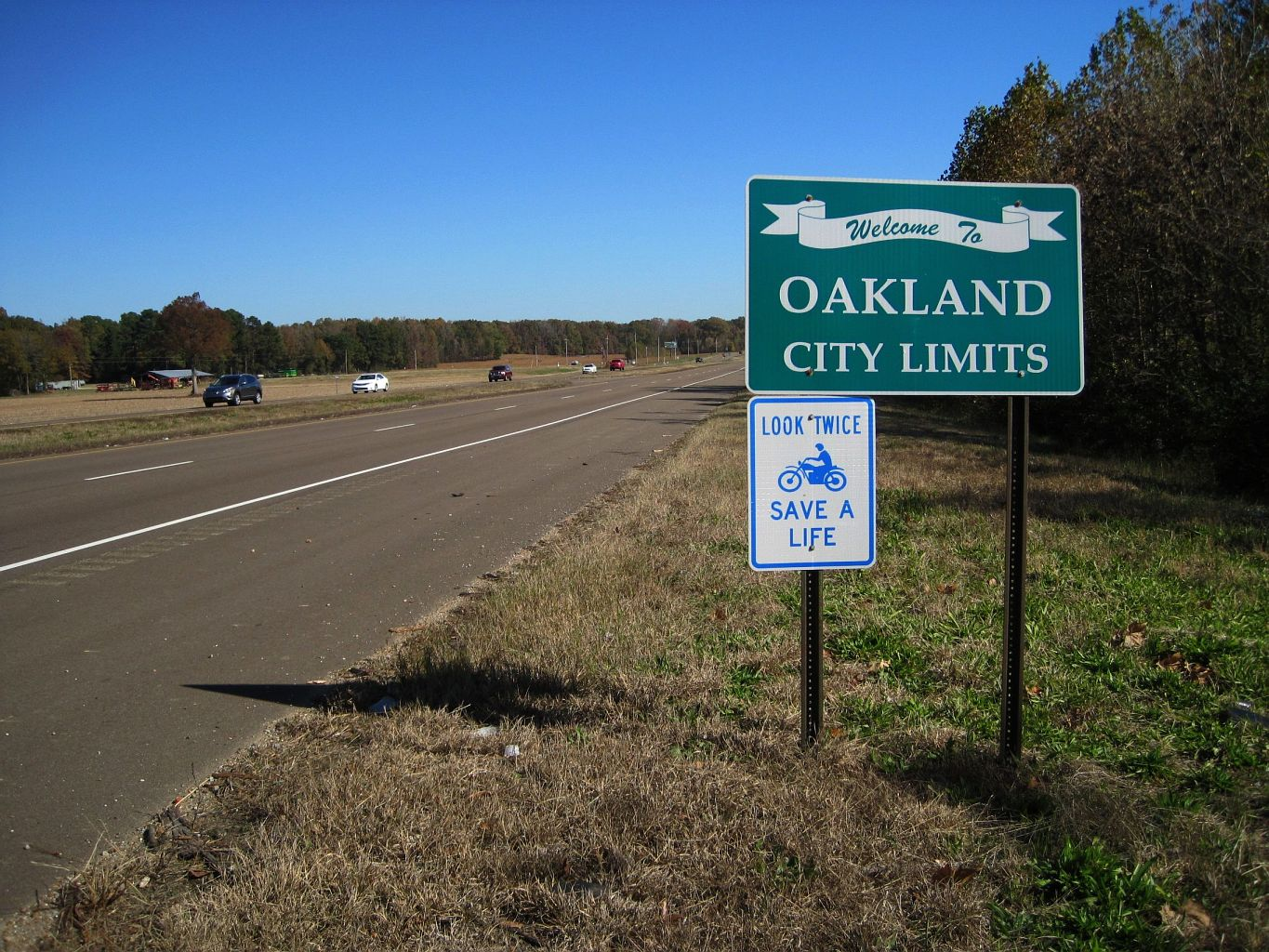
- Oakland welcome sign

- Flag Seal
- Nickname: "The Crossroads of North America"
- Location of Oakland in Fayette County, Tennessee.
- Coordinates: 35°13′36″N 89°31′5″W
- Country: United States
- State: Tennessee
- County: Fayette

Area
  - Total: 10.46 sq mi (27.08 km^{2})
  - Land: 10.42 sq mi (26.99 km^{2})
  - Water: 0.035 sq mi (0.09 km^{2})
- Elevation: 381 ft (116 m)

Population (2020)
  - Total: 8,936
  - Density: 857.5/sq mi (331.08/km^{2})
- Time zone: UTC-6 (Central (CST))
  - Summer (DST): UTC-5 (CDT)
- ZIP code: 38060
- Area code: 901
- FIPS code: 47-54920
- GNIS feature ID: 1296176
- Website: www.oaklandtennessee.org

Oakland is a town in Fayette County, Tennessee, United States. In 2020 the population of the town was 8,936, a gain of 417.8% since 2000, Reasons for this population boom, are the cities/counties low taxes, its low crime rate, and the 4 lane expansion of U.S. Highway 64 in the early 1990s.

== Geography ==
Oakland is located in west-central Fayette County. US 64 is the main highway through town, leading east 9 miles (14 km) to Somerville, the county seat, and west 32 miles (51 km) to downtown Memphis. South 18 miles (29 km) is the Tennessee-Mississippi state line. Tennessee Routes 194 and 196 are north-south state highways in Oakland.

According to the United States Census Bureau, as of 2010 the town had a total area of 10.3 square miles (26.6 km^{2}), compared to a total area in 2000 of 3.6 square miles (9.3 km^{2}). The town limits have expanded north and south of the original town center, and especially to the west along US 64, extending 6.5 miles (10.5 km) to nearly reach the Shelby County line.

=== Climate ===
Climate data for Memphis (Memphis Int'l), 1981−2010 normals, extremes 1872−present
Month	Jan	Feb	Mar	Apr	May	Jun	Jul	Aug	Sep	Oct	Nov	Dec	Year
Record high °F (°C)	79 (26)	81 (27)	87 (31)	94 (34)	99 (37)	104 (40)	108 (42)	107 (42)	103 (39)	98 (37)	86 (30)	81 (27)	108 (42)
Mean maximum °F (°C)	70.0 (21.1)	74.0 (23.3)	80.6 (27.0)	85.9 (29.9)	90.5 (32.5)	95.8 (35.4)	98.0 (36.7)	98.4 (36.9)	94.6 (34.8)	87.7 (30.9)	79.4 (26.3)	70.7 (21.5)	99.7 (37.6)
Average high °F (°C)	49.8 (9.9)	54.7 (12.6)	63.9 (17.7)	73.0 (22.8)	81.2 (27.3)	88.9 (31.6)	91.6 (33.1)	91.3 (32.9)	85.1 (29.5)	74.4 (23.6)	62.6 (17.0)	52.1 (11.2)	72.4 (22.4)
Daily mean °F (°C)	41.2 (5.1)	45.5 (7.5)	54.0 (12.2)	62.9 (17.2)	71.7 (22.1)	79.6 (26.4)	82.7 (28.2)	82.0 (27.8)	75.1 (23.9)	64.1 (17.8)	53.1 (11.7)	43.6 (6.4)	63.0 (17.2)
Average low °F (°C)	32.6 (0.3)	36.3 (2.4)	44.1 (6.7)	52.9 (11.6)	62.2 (16.8)	70.3 (21.3)	73.8 (23.2)	72.7 (22.6)	65.2 (18.4)	53.8 (12.1)	43.7 (6.5)	35.1 (1.7)	53.6 (12.0)
Mean minimum °F (°C)	15.0 (−9.4)	19.5 (−6.9)	27.0 (−2.8)	36.1 (2.3)	49.0 (9.4)	59.6 (15.3)	66.2 (19.0)	64.1 (17.8)	50.0 (10.0)	37.9 (3.3)	28.0 (−2.2)	18.3 (−7.6)	10.8 (−11.8)
Record low °F (°C)	−8 (−22)	−11 (−24)	12 (−11)	27 (−3)	36 (2)	48 (9)	52 (11)	48 (9)	36 (2)	25 (−4)	9 (−13)	−13 (−25)	−13 (−25)
Average precipitation inches (mm)	3.98 (101)	4.39 (112)	5.16 (131)	5.50 (140)	5.25 (133)	3.63 (92)	4.59 (117)	2.88 (73)	3.09 (78)	3.98 (101)	5.49 (139)	5.74 (146)	53.68 (1,363)
Average snowfall inches (cm)	1.9 (4.8)	1.3 (3.3)	0.4 (1.0)	0 (0)	0 (0)	0 (0)	0 (0)	0 (0)	0 (0)	0 (0)	trace	0.2 (0.51)	3.8 (9.7)
Average precipitation days (≥ 0.01 in)	9.5	9.2	10.5	9.6	10.3	9.0	8.8	6.8	7.3	7.5	9.5	9.7	107.7
Average snowy days (≥ 0.1 in)	1.2	0.8	0.4	0	0	0	0	0	0	0	0	0.4	2.8
Average relative humidity (%)	68.2	66.4	63.2	62.5	66.4	66.8	69.1	69.6	71.3	66.2	67.7	68.8	67.2
Mean monthly sunshine hours	166.6	173.8	215.3	254.6	301.5	320.6	326.9	307.0	251.2	245.9	173.0	151.9	2,888.3
Percent possible sunshine	53	57	58	65	69	74	74	74	68	70	56	50	65
Source: NOAA (relative humidity 1961−1990, sun 1961−1987)

== Demographics ==
Historical population
Census	Pop.	Note	%±
1880	66		—
1930	237		—
1940	251		5.9%
1950	236		−6.0%
1960	306		29.7%
1970	353		15.4%
1980	472		33.7%
1990	392		−16.9%
2000	1,279		226.3%
2010	6,623		417.8%
2020	8,936		34.9%
2025 (est.)	10,835	▲	21.3%

=== 2020 census ===
Oakland Racial Composition
Race	Num.	Perc.
White	6,109	68.36%
Black or African American	2,046	22.90%
Native American	6	0.07%
Asian	79	0.88%
Other/Mixed	395	4.42%
Hispanic or Latino	301	3.37%

As of the 2020 United States Census, there were 8,936 people, 3,100 households, and 2,490 families residing in the town.

=== 2000 census ===
As of the census of 2000, there were 1,279 people, 510 households, and 401 families residing in the town. The population density was 354.9 inhabitants per square mile (137.0/km^{2}). There were 554 housing units at an average density of 153.7 per square mile (59.3/km^{2}). The racial makeup of the town was 81.47% White, 16.50% African American, 0.31% Native American, 1.02% Asian, 0.47% from other races, and 0.23% from two or more races. Hispanic or Latino of any race were 1.56% of the population.

There were 510 households, out of which 33.9% had children under the age of 18 living with them, 67.8% were married couples living together, 8.2% had a female householder with no husband present, and 21.2% were non-families. 18.6% of all households were made up of individuals, and 3.7% had someone living alone who was 65 years of age or older. The average household size was 2.51 and the average family size was 2.85.

In the town, the population was spread out, with 23.9% under the age of 18, 9.6% from 18 to 24, 37.1% from 25 to 44, 20.8% from 45 to 64, and 8.5% who were 65 years of age or older. The median age was 31 years. For every 100 females, there were 96.8 males. For every 100 females age 18 and over, there were 95.4 males.

The median income for a household in the town was $51,823, and the median income for a family was $56,786. Males had a median income of $35,870 versus $23,929 for females. The per capita income for the town was $19,365. About 4.6% of families and 5.7% of the population were below the poverty line, including 9.3% of those under age 18 and 4.7% of those age 65 or over.

== Economy ==
In June 2007, although much smaller in population than its counterparts, Oakland had the highest number of building permits issued for any suburb in the Memphis metropolitan area, including Southaven and Olive Branch, Mississippi, and Collierville, Tennessee. Retail stores make up most of the commercial business. RING Container Technologies - a plastic fabrication company - is headquartered in Oakland. Back in the early 20th century, Oakland was home to Tennessee's largest egg factory, as well as a large Christmas Tree farm. Oakland has a golf course called, "The Fair Oaks Golf Course" . It has been open since 2000.

== Government ==
In November 2008, Bill Mullins was elected mayor for his fifth term, beating rival Scott Ferguson in a narrow victory; the margin of votes between them just 15.

In July 2009, Mayor Mullins was arrested on charges of official misconduct and concealing evidence. The following March, a jury found him guilty on three counts of official misconduct. Prosecutors said Mullins falsified documents to cover up payments made to his own business by the City of Oakland, after he had completed work on city owned vehicles at his privately owned repair shop, but did not document the $2,000 payment. Mullins also had a local merchant bill the Town of Oakland for Transmission Rebuilds, then collected funds from the merchant. The merchant was not charged, but did testify at Mullins's trial. Mullins was sentenced to one year probation and prohibited from holding any elected or appointed office for 10 years.

In December 2009, the November 2008 election was ruled invalid after 23 people were found to have voted illegally. In a follow-up election in 2010, Scott Ferguson was elected mayor.

In 2013, Mayor Ferguson—a former preacher—resigned from office after it was revealed he had two wives. The Vice-mayor, Chris Goodman, assumed office until 2016. In 2016 Chris Goodman was elected. In November 2020, he was defeated by Mike Brown.

Accusations regarding the arrest of Brandon Calloway went viral in 2022. Calloway was allegedly assaulted during an arrest by Oakland police officers on July 16, 2022, while fleeing from a traffic violation. When police attempted to pull over Calloway, he fled to and entered what was later found to be his father's residence. The Tennessee Bureau of Investigation investigated the incident. In November 2022, a grand jury returned a No True Bill, and the officers were not charged.
