= Moscow, Tennessee =

- City
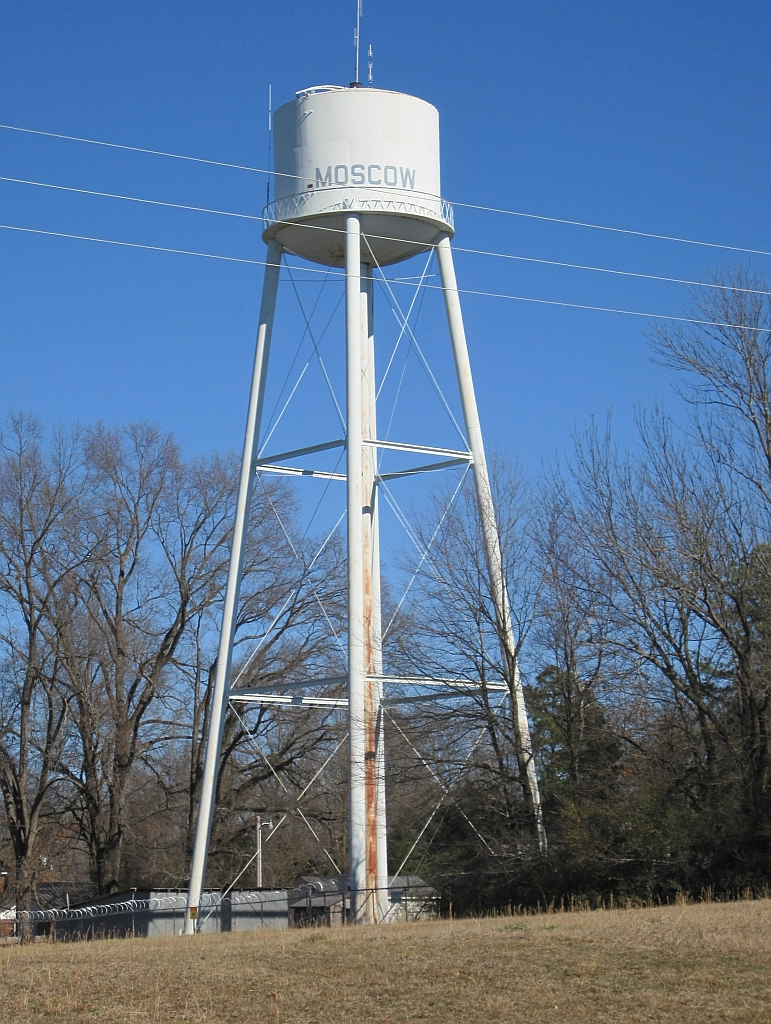
- The water tower in Moscow

- Location of Moscow in Fayette County, Tennessee.
- Coordinates: 35°3′40″N 89°23′59″W
- Country: United States
- State: Tennessee
- County: Fayette

Area
  - Total: 1.29 sq mi (3.33 km^{2})
  - Land: 1.28 sq mi (3.31 km^{2})
  - Water: 0.0077 sq mi (0.02 km^{2})
- Elevation: 354 ft (108 m)

Population (2020)
  - Total: 572
  - Density: 448.2/sq mi (173.06/km^{2})
- Time zone: UTC-6 (Central (CST))
  - Summer (DST): UTC-5 (CDT)
- ZIP code: 38057
- Area code: 901
- FIPS code: 47-50300
- GNIS feature ID: 1294477
- Website: cityofmoscowtn.com

Moscow (/ˈmɒskoʊ/ MOS-koh) is a city in Fayette County, Tennessee, United States. The population was 572 at the 2020 census. The town was named after Moscow, Russia, by its founder J. A. Dilliard to honor his wife Alexandra, a native of the Russian city, whom he met on a business trip to Russia in 1834. Moscow, Tennessee maintained close relations with Russia in the years leading to the Civil War, which led to Dilliard’s niece, Lucy Pickens born in La Grange, Tennessee, along with her husband serving as the US ambassador to Russia then after secession serving as Confederate representative to the Russian Emperor during the Civil War. {{Citation needed}} Moscow is also known as the “Land Between Two Rivers,” in Mississippian "Mossac," due to its location after the Army Corps of Engineers rerouted the waterways, moving the main channel west to its current location.

== Geography ==
Moscow is located in southern Fayette County at 35°3′40″N 89°23′59″W (35.060976, -89.399649), at the confluence of the Wolf River with its North Fork.

Tennessee State Route 57 passes through the city, leading east 13 miles (21 km) to Grand Junction and west 15 miles (24 km) to Collierville. Downtown Memphis is 38 miles (61 km) to the west. Tennessee State Route 76 leads north from Moscow 13 miles (21 km) to Somerville, the Fayette County seat.

According to the United States Census Bureau, the city of Moscow has a total area of 1.2 square miles (3.2 km^{2}), of which 0.01 square miles (0.02 km^{2}), or 0.73%, is water.

=== Climate ===
According to the Köppen Climate Classification system, Moscow has a humid subtropical climate, abbreviated "Cfa" on climate maps. The hottest temperature recorded in Moscow was 110 °F (43.3 °C) on July 28, 1952, while the coldest temperature recorded was −14 °F (−25.6 °C) on February 2, 1951.

Climate data for Moscow, Tennessee, 1991–2020 normals, extremes 1920–2013
Month	Jan	Feb	Mar	Apr	May	Jun	Jul	Aug	Sep	Oct	Nov	Dec	Year
Record high °F (°C)	80 (27)	82 (28)	91 (33)	94 (34)	98 (37)	107 (42)	110 (43)	107 (42)	105 (41)	95 (35)	88 (31)	80 (27)	110 (43)
Mean maximum °F (°C)	69.1 (20.6)	73.7 (23.2)	80.3 (26.8)	85.9 (29.9)	89.1 (31.7)	93.8 (34.3)	96.7 (35.9)	96.6 (35.9)	92.8 (33.8)	85.8 (29.9)	79.1 (26.2)	70.1 (21.2)	98.1 (36.7)
Mean daily maximum °F (°C)	50.7 (10.4)	54.8 (12.7)	64.2 (17.9)	72.8 (22.7)	79.9 (26.6)	86.9 (30.5)	90.4 (32.4)	89.6 (32.0)	84.5 (29.2)	74.6 (23.7)	63.9 (17.7)	53.3 (11.8)	72.1 (22.3)
Daily mean °F (°C)	40.3 (4.6)	43.7 (6.5)	52.2 (11.2)	61.4 (16.3)	69.9 (21.1)	76.9 (24.9)	80.6 (27.0)	79.9 (26.6)	73.1 (22.8)	61.8 (16.6)	51.4 (10.8)	43.0 (6.1)	61.2 (16.2)
Mean daily minimum °F (°C)	29.9 (−1.2)	32.6 (0.3)	40.6 (4.8)	50.0 (10.0)	59.9 (15.5)	67.0 (19.4)	70.8 (21.6)	70.2 (21.2)	61.8 (16.6)	48.9 (9.4)	38.9 (3.8)	32.7 (0.4)	50.3 (10.2)
Mean minimum °F (°C)	10.3 (−12.1)	16.6 (−8.6)	23.2 (−4.9)	32.6 (0.3)	44.7 (7.1)	54.0 (12.2)	60.3 (15.7)	59.1 (15.1)	44.6 (7.0)	31.6 (−0.2)	24.8 (−4.0)	14.8 (−9.6)	7.2 (−13.8)
Record low °F (°C)	−11 (−24)	−14 (−26)	10 (−12)	19 (−7)	32 (0)	43 (6)	46 (8)	45 (7)	29 (−2)	20 (−7)	5 (−15)	−12 (−24)	−14 (−26)
Average precipitation inches (mm)	4.03 (102)	4.44 (113)	5.51 (140)	4.99 (127)	5.61 (142)	4.30 (109)	4.11 (104)	4.59 (117)	3.80 (97)	4.35 (110)	3.89 (99)	5.25 (133)	54.87 (1,393)
Average snowfall inches (cm)	0.6 (1.5)	1.0 (2.5)	0.2 (0.51)	0.1 (0.25)	0.0 (0.0)	0.0 (0.0)	0.0 (0.0)	0.0 (0.0)	0.0 (0.0)	0.0 (0.0)	0.0 (0.0)	0.0 (0.0)	1.9 (4.76)
Average precipitation days (≥ 0.01 in)	6.8	6.7	6.7	6.8	6.6	5.5	7.1	5.0	5.6	5.5	6.0	6.5	74.8
Average snowy days (≥ 0.1 in)	0.3	0.4	0.1	0.1	0.0	0.0	0.0	0.0	0.0	0.0	0.0	0.1	1.0
Source 1: NOAA
Source 2: XMACIS2 (mean maxima/minima 1981–2010)

== Demographics ==
Historical population
Census	Pop.	Note	%±
1880	193		—
1890	201		4.1%
1910	211		—
1920	314		48.8%
1930	296		−5.7%
1940	309		4.4%
1950	394		27.5%
1960	368		−6.6%
1970	448		21.7%
1980	499		11.4%
1990	384		−23.0%
2000	422		9.9%
2010	556		31.8%
2020	572		2.9%

=== Racial and ethnic composition ===
Moscow, Tennessee – Racial and ethnic composition Note: the U.S. census treats Hispanic/Latino as an ethnic category. This table excludes Latinos from the racial categories and assigns them to a separate category. Hispanics/Latinos may be of any race.
Race / Ethnicity (NH = Non-Hispanic)	Pop 2000	Pop 2010	Pop 2020	% 2000	% 2010	% 2020
White alone (NH)	289	223	219	68.48%	40.11%	38.29%
Black or African American alone (NH)	122	311	318	28.91%	55.94%	55.59%
Native American or Alaska Native alone (NH)	1	0	2	0.24%	0.00%	0.35%
Asian alone (NH)	0	0	1	0.00%	0.00%	0.17%
Pacific Islander alone (NH)	0	1	0	0.00%	0.18%	0.00%
Some Other Race alone (NH)	0	0	3	0.00%	0.00%	0.52%
Mixed Race or Multi-Racial (NH)	5	3	9	1.18%	0.54%	1.57%
Hispanic or Latino (any race)	5	18	20	1.18%	3.24%	3.50%
Total	422	556	572	100.00%	100.00%	100.00%

=== 2020 census ===
As of the 2020 census, Moscow had a population of 572, and the median age was 35.7 years. 26.2% of residents were under the age of 18 and 13.3% were 65 years of age or older. For every 100 females there were 72.8 males, and for every 100 females age 18 and over there were 70.2 males age 18 and over.

0.0% of residents lived in urban areas, while 100.0% lived in rural areas.

There were 218 households in Moscow, of which 30.3% had children under the age of 18 living in them. Of all households, 25.7% were married-couple households, 20.6% were households with a male householder and no spouse or partner present, and 45.4% were households with a female householder and no spouse or partner present. About 28.4% of all households were made up of individuals and 13.7% had someone living alone who was 65 years of age or older.

There were 246 housing units, of which 11.4% were vacant. The homeowner vacancy rate was 1.6% and the rental vacancy rate was 10.0%.

Racial composition as of the 2020 census
Race	Number	Percent
White	227	39.7%
Black or African American	320	55.9%
American Indian and Alaska Native	2	0.3%
Asian	1	0.2%
Native Hawaiian and Other Pacific Islander	0	0.0%
Some other race	10	1.7%
Two or more races	12	2.1%
Hispanic or Latino (of any race)	20	3.5%

=== 2000 census ===
As of the 2000 census of 2000, there was a population of 422, with 172 households and 108 families residing in the city. The population density was 340.8 inhabitants per square mile (131.6/km^{2}). There were 185 housing units at an average density of 149.4 per square mile (57.7/km^{2}). The racial makeup of the city was 68.96% White, 29.15% African American, 0.24% Native American, 0.47% from other races, and 1.18% from two or more races. Hispanic or Latino of any race were 1.18% of the population.

There were 172 households, out of which 18.6% had children under the age of 18 living with them, 41.9% were married couples living together, 18.6% had a female householder with no husband present, and 37.2% were non-families. 36.0% of all households were made up of individuals, and 23.8% had someone living alone who was 65 years of age or older. The average household size was 2.45 and the average family size was 3.24.

In the city, the population was spread out, with 20.9% under the age of 18, 10.9% from 18 to 24, 25.6% from 25 to 44, 22.3% from 45 to 64, and 20.4% who were 65 years of age or older. The median age was 39 years. For every 100 females, there were 76.6 males. For every 100 females age 18 and over, there were 70.4 males.

The median income for a household in the city was $33,021, and the median income for a family was $46,875. Males had a median income of $35,417 versus $21,346 for females. The per capita income for the city was $14,772. About 16.3% of families and 21.0% of the population were below the poverty line, including 21.1% of those under age 18 and 24.2% of those age 65 or over.

== Battle of Moscow ==
Moscow was the site of a skirmish during the Civil War on December 4, 1863. Confederate cavalry under the command of Gen. Stephen D. Lee attempted to burn the railroad bridge over the Wolf River, in order to aid Gen. Nathan Bedford Forrest in returning to Tennessee from Mississippi. They were thwarted by African-American Union troops who were stationed nearby. Union Gen. Stephen A. Hurlbut wrote of these troops in a dispatch dated December 17, 1863: "The recent affair at Moscow, Tennessee, has demonstrated the fact that colored troops, properly trained and disciplined, can and will fight well."

== Famous residents ==
Compton Newby Crook, who was born in Rossville, Tennessee, and who wrote science fiction under the pseudonym Stephen Tall, grew up in Moscow.

== Gallery ==
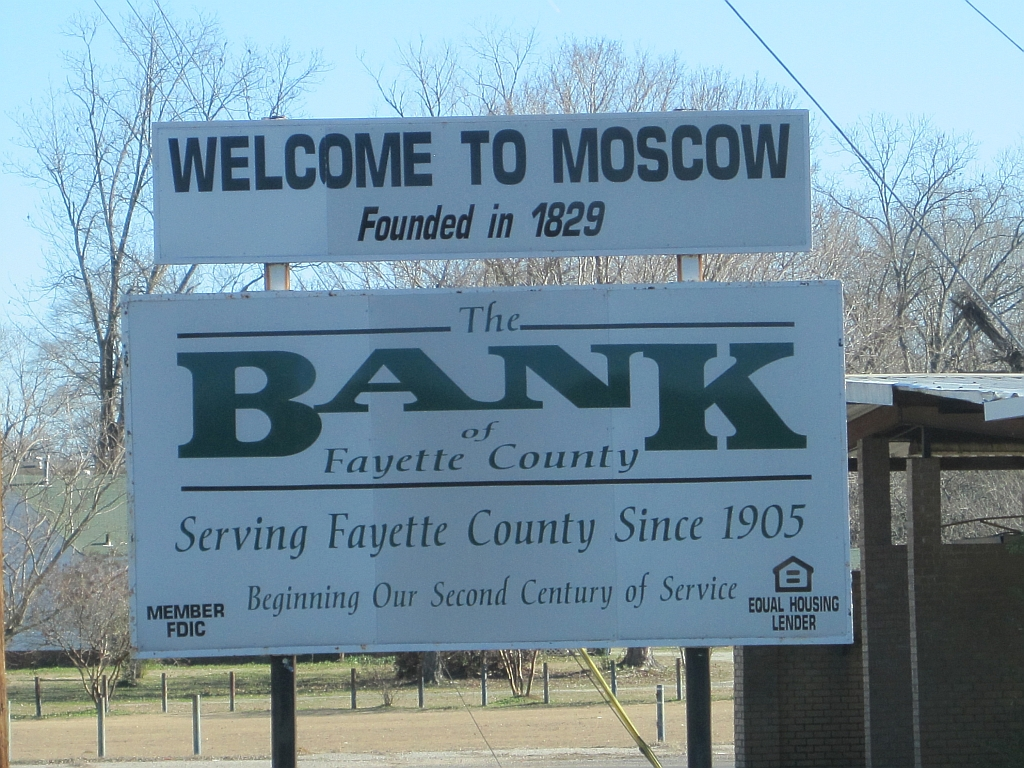

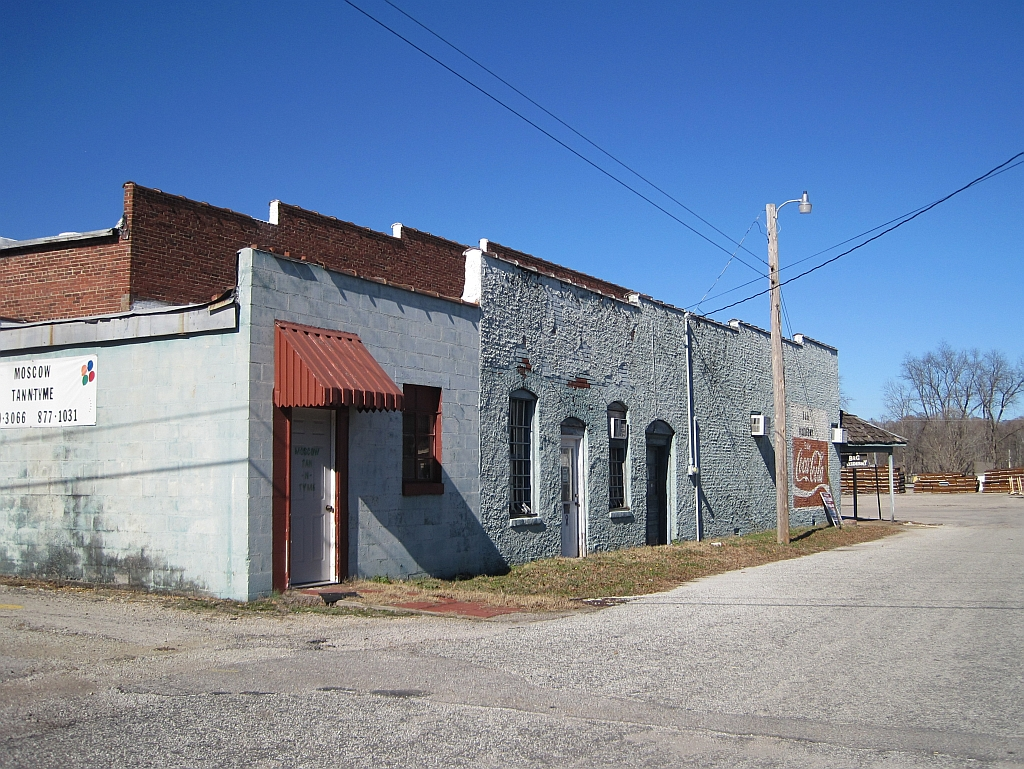

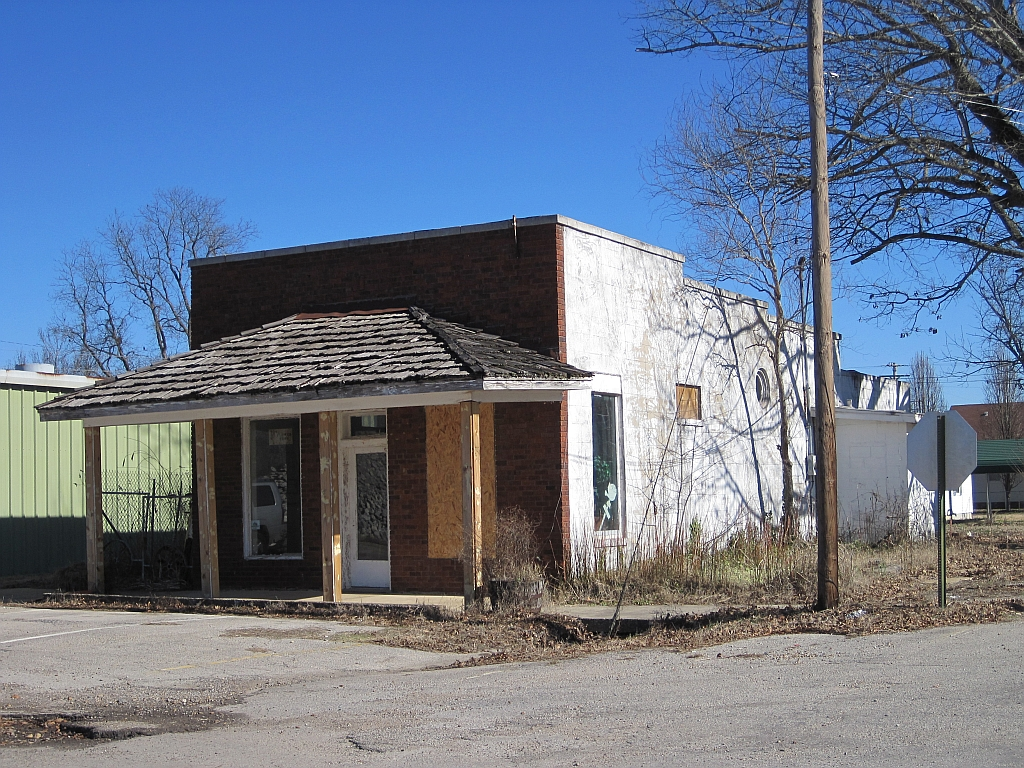

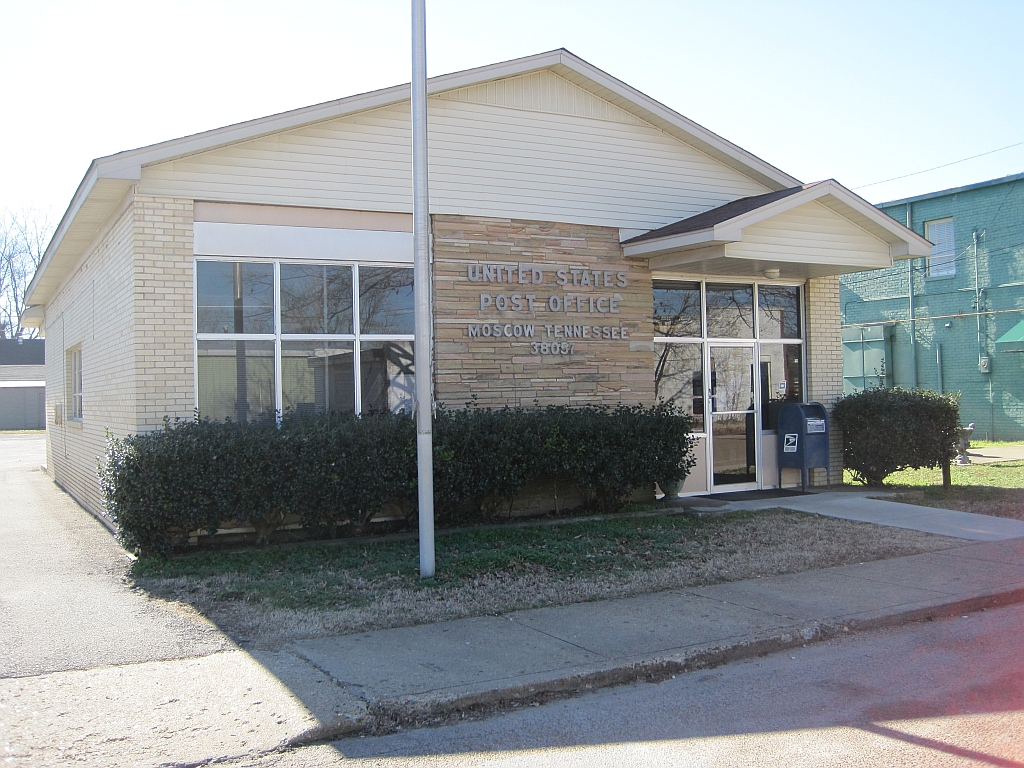

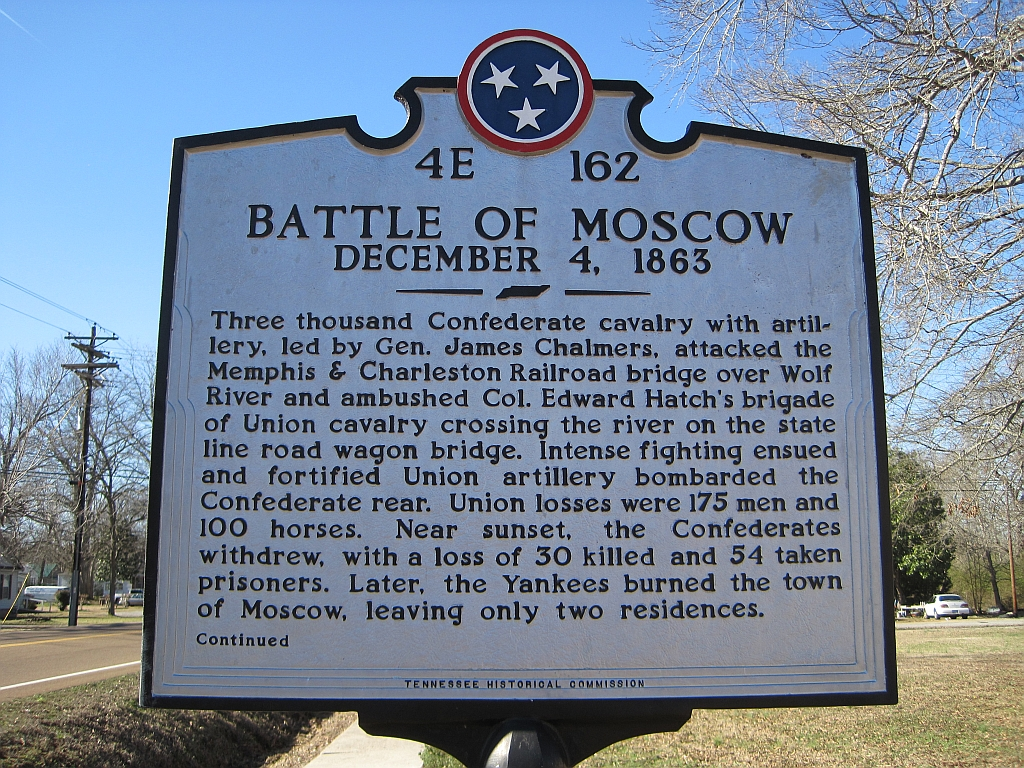

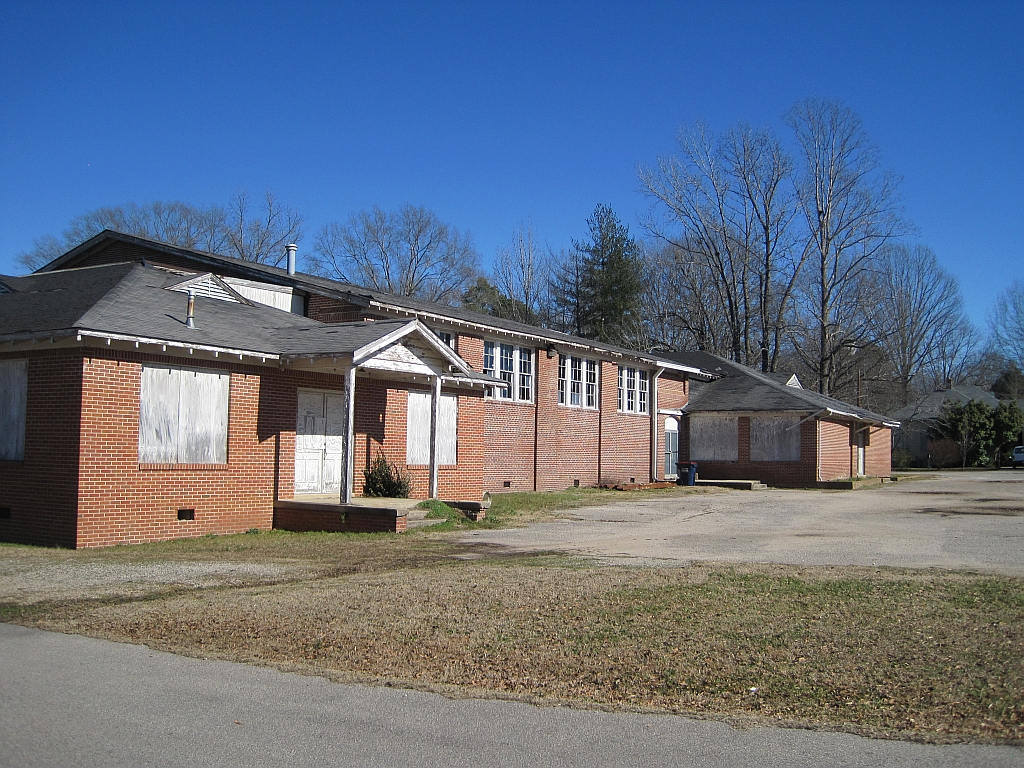
