= Fayette County, Tennessee =

County in Tennessee, United States

- County
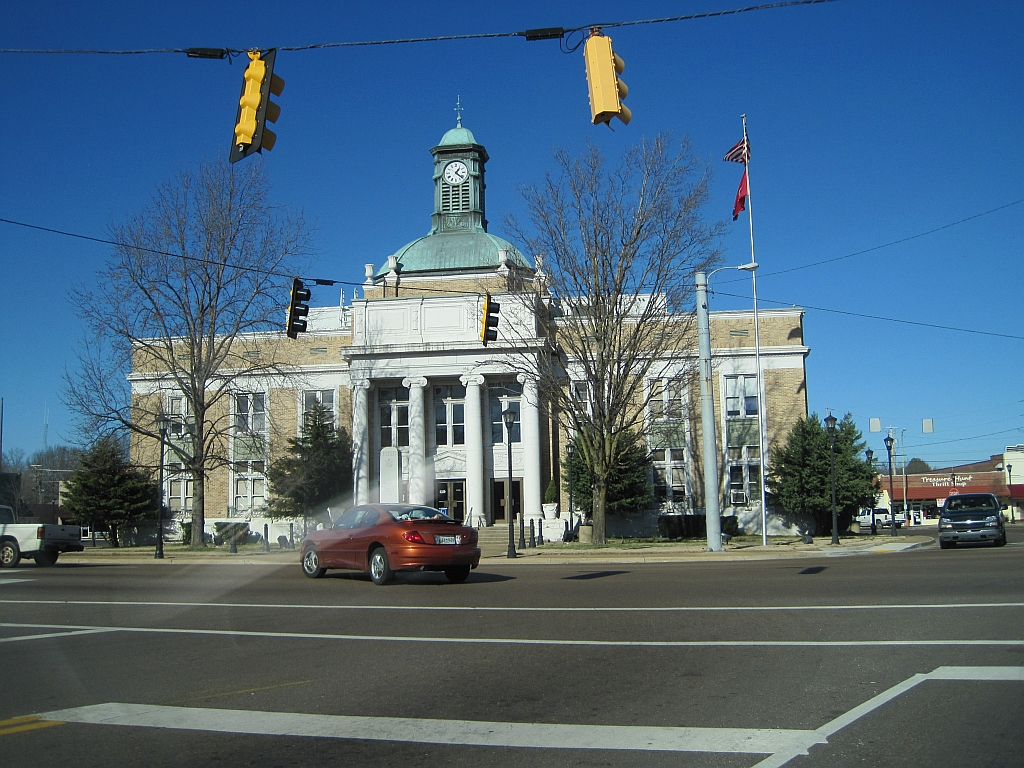
- Fayette County Courthouse in Somerville

- Seal

- Location within the U.S. state of Tennessee
- Coordinates: 35°11′N 89°25′W
- Country: United States
- State: Tennessee
- Founded: September 29, 1824
- Named for: Marquis de Lafayette
- Seat: Somerville
- Largest town: Oakland

Area
  - Total: 706 sq mi (1,830 km^{2})
  - Land: 705 sq mi (1,830 km^{2})
  - Water: 1.5 sq mi (3.9 km^{2}) 0.2%

Population (2020)
  - Total: 41,990
  - Estimate (2025): 45,071 ▲
  - Density: 59.6/sq mi (23.0/km^{2})
- Time zone: UTC−6 (Central)
  - Summer (DST): UTC−5 (CDT)
- Congressional district: 8th
- Website: fayettetn.us

Fayette County is a county located in the U.S. state of Tennessee. As of the 2020 census, the population was 41,990. Its county seat is Somerville. The county was named after the Marquis de la Fayette, French hero of the American Revolution. A part of the Memphis, TN–MS–AR Metropolitan Statistical Area, Fayette County is culturally alike to the Mississippi Delta and was a major area of cotton plantations dependent on slave labor in the nineteenth century.

== History ==
Fayette County was established by Tennessee General Assembly in 1824 from the neighboring counties of Shelby and Hardeman. The same year, Somerville was selected as its county seat. The first churches in the county were the First Presbyterian Church in Somerville, established in 1829, and Immanuel Parish, established in 1832.

Herb Parsons 1908–1959) of Somerville, Tennessee, was Winchester's "Showman Shooter" for 30 years.

Following the emancipation of slaves on plantations, many of Fayette County's African-American residents worked as sharecroppers. In the 1960s and 1970s, civil rights activists fought for school integration and voting rights; and created tent cities to house displaced tenant farmers who had tried to register to vote.

In recent years, Fayette County has been transitioning from a rural area to accommodate the suburban sprawl from Memphis.

== Geography ==
According to the U.S. Census Bureau, the county has a total area of 706 square miles (1,830 km^{2}), of which 705 square miles (1,830 km^{2}) is land and 1.5 square miles (3.9 km^{2}) (0.2%) is water. It is the third-largest county in Tennessee by area. The county is, roughly, the same size as Marshall County, Mississippi.

=== Adjacent counties ===
- Haywood County (north)
- Hardeman County (east)
- Benton County, Mississippi (southeast)
- Marshall County, Mississippi (south)
- Shelby County (west)
- Tipton County (northwest)

=== State protected areas ===
- William B. Clark Conservation Area
- Ghost River State Natural Area
- Piperton Wetland Complex Wildlife Management Area (part)
- Wolf River Wildlife Management Area
- WMA Briggs Tract
- Herb Parsons Lake

== Demographics ==
Historical population
Census	Pop.	Note	%±
1830	8,652		—
1840	21,501		148.5%
1850	26,719		24.3%
1860	24,327		−9.0%
1870	26,145		7.5%
1880	31,871		21.9%
1890	28,878		−9.4%
1900	29,701		2.8%
1910	30,257		1.9%
1920	31,499		4.1%
1930	28,891		−8.3%
1940	30,322		5.0%
1950	27,535		−9.2%
1960	24,577		−10.7%
1970	22,692		−7.7%
1980	25,305		11.5%
1990	25,559		1.0%
2000	28,806		12.7%
2010	38,413		33.4%
2020	41,990		9.3%
2025 (est.)	45,071	▲	7.3%
U.S. Decennial Census; 1790–1960 1900–1990; 1990–2000 2010–2014 2017

Since the four-lane expansion of Highway 64 in the early 1990s, western Fayette County has had a population explosion. Although the county seat is still in Somerville, the population of Oakland has far surpassed it because of the influx of people working in Shelby County and seeking more affordable housing.

Although Fayette County is growing on its western side, the county's economy is still based on agriculture. Historically it was a site of cotton plantations as part of the Mississippi Delta. Several of the county's largest farmers control the vast majority of the county's wealth. Some of these families have been farming for generations dating back to plantations before the Civil War. Others are younger farmers who have used their skill, business savvy, and work ethic to develop large farming operations.

Fayette County has become a destination for people of the Memphis metro area. The total value for building permits in June 2007 was close to that of the much larger Memphis suburban area of DeSoto County, Mississippi.

=== Racial and ethnic composition ===
Fayette County, Tennessee – Racial and ethnic composition Note: the US Census treats Hispanic/Latino as an ethnic category. This table excludes Latinos from the racial categories and assigns them to a separate category. Hispanics/Latinos may be of any race.
Race / ethnicity (NH = Non-Hispanic)	Pop 1980	Pop 1990	Pop 2000	Pop 2010	Pop 2020	% 1980	% 1990	% 2000	% 2010	% 2020
White alone (NH)	12,412	14,157	17,858	26,193	27,558	49.05%	55.39%	61.99%	68.19%	65.63%
Black or African American alone (NH)	12,485	11,224	10,312	10,742	11,038	49.34%	43.91%	35.80%	27.96%	26.29%
Native American or Alaska Native alone (NH)	14	32	50	106	59	0.06%	0.13%	0.17%	0.28%	0.14%
Asian alone (NH)	9	15	61	186	269	0.04%	0.06%	0.21%	0.48%	0.64%
Native Hawaiian or Pacific Islander alone (NH)	x	x	2	3	18	x	x	0.01%	0.01%	0.04%
Other race alone (NH)	8	1	9	23	158	0.03%	0.00%	0.03%	0.06%	0.38%
Mixed race or Multiracial (NH)	x	x	216	302	1,460	x	x	0.75%	0.79%	3.48%
Hispanic or Latino (any race)	377	130	298	858	1,430	1.49%	0.51%	1.03%	2.23%	3.41%
Total	25,305	25,559	28,806	38,413	41,990	100.00%	100.00%	100.00%	100.00%	100.00%

=== 2020 census ===
As of the 2020 census, there were 41,990 people, 16,625 households, and 11,567 families residing in the county. The median age was 47.6 years, 18.8% of residents were under the age of 18, and 22.1% were 65 years of age or older; there were 96.8 males for every 100 females and 94.3 males for every 100 females age 18 and over.

The racial makeup of the county was 66.3% White, 26.4% Black or African American, 0.2% American Indian and Alaska Native, 0.6% Asian, 0.1% Native Hawaiian and Pacific Islander, 1.8% from some other race, and 4.5% from two or more races; Hispanic or Latino residents of any race comprised 3.4% of the population.

25.3% of residents lived in urban areas, while 74.7% lived in rural areas.

There were 16,625 households in the county, of which 26.1% had children under the age of 18 living in them. Of all households, 55.9% were married-couple households, 16.2% were households with a male householder and no spouse or partner present, and 23.8% were households with a female householder and no spouse or partner present. About 23.0% of all households were made up of individuals and 10.7% had someone living alone who was 65 years of age or older.

There were 17,554 housing units, of which 5.3% were vacant. Among occupied housing units, 82.6% were owner-occupied and 17.4% were renter-occupied. The homeowner vacancy rate was 1.2% and the rental vacancy rate was 5.5%.

=== 2010 census ===
As of the census of 2010 there were 38,413 people, 14,505 households, and 11,029 families residing in the county. The population density was 54.49 persons per square mile and the housing unit density was 20.57 units per square mile. The racial makeup of the county was 69.19% White, 28.07% Black or African American, 0.48% Asian, 0.28% Native American, 0.01% Pacific Islander, 1.08% from other races, and 0.89% from two or more races. Those of Hispanic or Latino origins were 2.23% of the population.

Of the 14,505 households, 32.58% had children under the age of 18 living in them, 58.24% were married couples living together, 4.64% had a male householder with no wife present, 13.15% had a female householder with no husband present, and 23.96% were non-families. 20.77% of all households were made up of individuals, and 7.71% had someone living alone who was 65 years of age or older. The average household size was 2.62 and the average family size was 3.02

Of the 38,413 residents, 23.11% were under the age of 18, 62.01% were between the ages of 18 and 64, and 14.88% were 65 years of age or older. The median age was 41.9 years. 50.42% of the residents were female, and 49.58% were male.

The median household income in the county was $57,919 and the median family income was $68,159. Males had a median income of $50,560 versus $40,412 for females. The per capita income for the county was $30,471. About 9.9% of families and 14.4% of the population were below the poverty line, including 22.1% of those under the age of 18 and 9.8% of those age 65 and over.

=== 2000 census ===
As of the census of 2000, there were 28,806 people, 10,467 households, and 8,017 families residing in the county. The population density was 41 inhabitants per square mile (16/km^{2}). There were 11,214 housing units at an average density of 16 units per square mile (6.2/km^{2}). The racial makeup of the county was 62.48% White, 35.95% Black or African American, 0.19% Native American, 0.22% Asian, 0.01% Pacific Islander, 0.39% from other races, and 0.76% from two or more races. 1.03% of the population were Hispanic or Latino of any race.

According to the census of 2000, the largest ancestry groups in Fayette County were English 51.66%, African 35.95%, Scots-Irish 7.1%, and Scottish 1.2%.

In 2000 there were 10,467 households, out of which 31.00% had children under the age of 18 living with them, 58.50% were married couples living together, 14.00% had a female householder with no husband present, and 23.40% were non-families. 20.50% of all households were made up of individuals, and 8.60% had someone living alone who was 65 years of age or older. The average household size was 2.71 and the average family size was 3.14.

In the county, the population was spread out, with 25.70% under the age of 18, 8.20% from 18 to 24, 27.40% from 25 to 44, 25.60% from 45 to 64, and 13.00% who were 65 years of age or older. The median age was 38 years. For every 100 females there were 96.50 males. For every 100 females age 18 and over, there were 92.20 males.

The median income for a household in the county was $40,279, and the median income for a family was $46,283. Males had a median income of $33,603 versus $24,690 for females. The per capita income for the county was $17,969. About 10.90% of families and 14.30% of the population were below the poverty line, including 18.40% of those under age 18 and 18.00% of those age 65 or over.

== Education ==
- "Fayette County Schools".
- Fayette Ware Comprehensive High
- Fayette Academy (PK-12 Independent School)
- Fayette Christian School
- Rossville Christian Academy
- West Jr High
- East Jr High
- Buckley-Carpenter Elementary School
- Southwest Elementary
- Oakland Elementary
- LaGrange-Moscow Elementary
- University of Tennessee at Martin (Somerville Campus)

== Communities ==
=== Cities ===
- Gallaway
- Grand Junction (mostly in Hardeman County)
- Moscow
- Piperton
- Williston

=== Towns ===
- Braden
- La Grange
- Oakland
- Rossville
- Somerville (county seat)

=== Unincorporated communities ===
- Fisherville‡
- Hickory Withe
- Laconia
- Liberty Hill
- Macon
- Yum Yum
- Zu Zu

== Politics ==
Fayette County has a 19-seat legislative body referred to as the Board of County Commissioners representing 8 districts. All positions are elected every four years.

* District 1 (Somerville)

  - Matt Rhea
  - Win Moore

* District 2 (Laconia)

  - Ray Seals
  - Tommy Perkins

* District 3 (Gallaway/Braden/Garnett)

  - Elizabeth Rice
  - Jim Norton

* District 4 (North Oakland)

  - David Webb
  - Tim A. Goodroe

* District 5 (Piperton/Rossville)

  - Terrye Canady
  - Betty Knox Morrison Salmon
  - David Crislip

* District 6 (Moscow/Williston)

  - Mike Reeves
  - Steve Reeves

* District 7 (Moscow)

  - Claude Oglesby

* District 8 (Hickory Withe/Eads)

  - Robert Sills
  - Terry Leggett

* District 9 (South Oakland)

  - Adrian Wiggins
  - Steve Laskoski

* District 10 (Lagrange)

  - Larry Watkins

The County Mayor is currently Rhea "Skip" Taylor.

United States presidential election results for Fayette County, Tennessee
Year	Republican		Democratic		Third party(ies)	
Year	No.	%	No.	%	No.	%
1912	59	6.01%	830	84.52%	93	9.47%
1916	116	6.01%	1,812	93.89%	2	0.10%
1920	346	13.11%	2,294	86.89%	0	0.00%
1924	65	5.11%	1,181	92.77%	27	2.12%
1928	121	9.91%	1,100	90.09%	0	0.00%
1932	42	3.12%	1,287	95.62%	17	1.26%
1936	29	1.62%	1,764	98.38%	0	0.00%
1940	78	4.09%	1,826	95.80%	2	0.10%
1944	172	10.81%	1,417	89.06%	2	0.13%
1948	66	3.70%	226	12.66%	1,493	83.64%
1952	1,029	46.73%	1,173	53.27%	0	0.00%
1956	358	18.19%	639	32.47%	971	49.34%
1960	1,370	48.95%	892	31.87%	537	19.19%
1964	2,922	52.57%	2,636	47.43%	0	0.00%
1968	740	13.34%	2,236	40.32%	2,570	46.34%
1972	3,264	59.75%	2,067	37.84%	132	2.42%
1976	2,133	35.31%	3,853	63.79%	54	0.89%
1980	2,944	40.92%	4,141	57.55%	110	1.53%
1984	3,733	50.44%	3,634	49.10%	34	0.46%
1988	3,573	51.63%	3,292	47.57%	56	0.81%
1992	3,713	43.13%	4,211	48.91%	685	7.96%
1996	4,406	46.29%	4,655	48.90%	458	4.81%
2000	6,402	55.53%	5,037	43.69%	90	0.78%
2004	8,962	60.81%	5,696	38.65%	79	0.54%
2008	12,173	63.22%	6,892	35.80%	189	0.98%
2012	12,689	64.83%	6,688	34.17%	197	1.01%
2016	13,055	67.31%	5,874	30.29%	465	2.40%
2020	15,690	68.26%	7,027	30.57%	267	1.16%
2024	16,756	70.71%	6,720	28.36%	220	0.93%

Historically, Fayette County was part of the "Solid South" whereby the county's black majority was entirely disenfranchised. From the end of Reconstruction until Harry S. Truman's civil rights proposals during the 1940s, Democrats won over 85 percent of Fayette County's vote even in 1920 and 1928 when Warren G. Harding and Herbert Hoover carried the state's electoral votes. During the Civil Rights era, Fayette County's politics resembled that of Mississippi more than that of the rest of Tennessee, with Strom Thurmond winning over 83 percent of the county's limited electorate in 1948 and T. Coleman Andrews carrying the county as a "States' Rights" candidate in 1956. Once the county's blacks were enfranchised during the 1960s, Democrats would carry the county or only lose narrowly between 1976 and 1996, but in the twenty-first century as the county becomes increasingly white and suburban, its strongly conservative social views have made it strongly Republican. The first county Republican Primary was held in 2018.

== See also ==
- National Register of Historic Places listings in Fayette County, Tennessee
- Herb Parsons Lake
- Wolf River (Tennessee)
- Wolf River Conservancy
