= Somerville, Tennessee =

- Town
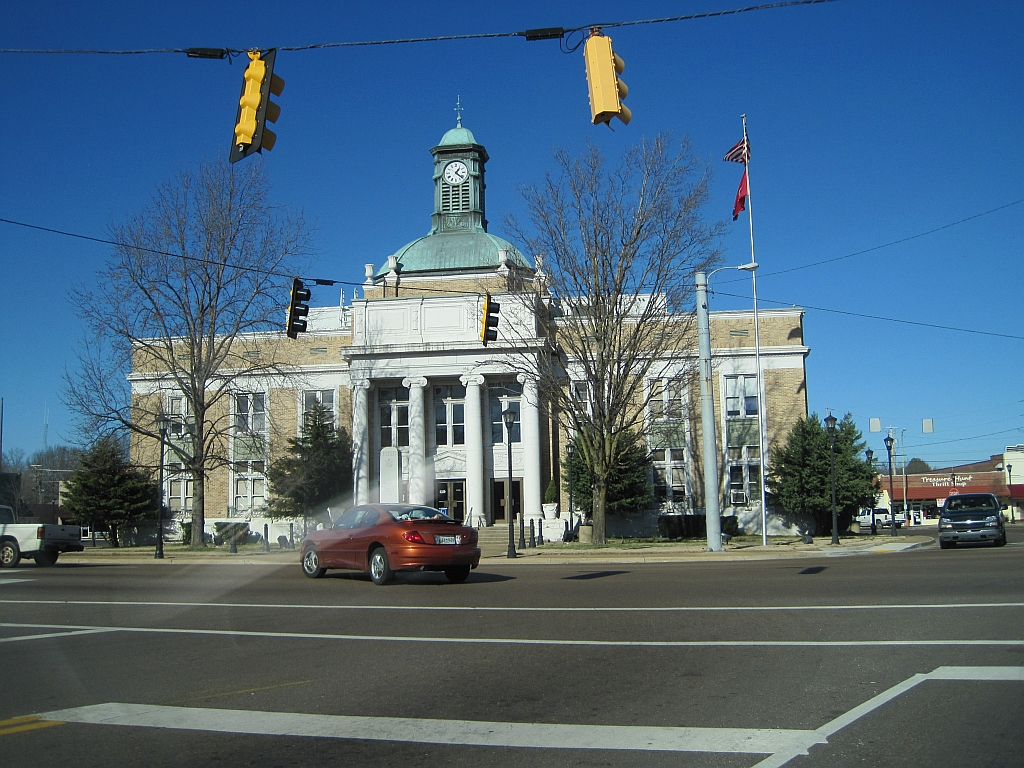
- Fayette County Courthouse in Somerville

- Location of Somerville in Fayette County, Tennessee.

- Location of Somerville in the United States
- Coordinates: 35°14′15″N 89°21′30″W
- Country: United States
- State: Tennessee
- County: Fayette

Area
  - Total: 13.70 sq mi (35.49 km^{2})
  - Land: 13.57 sq mi (35.14 km^{2})
  - Water: 0.14 sq mi (0.36 km^{2})
- Elevation: 397 ft (121 m)

Population (2020)
  - Total: 3,415
  - Density: 251.7/sq mi (97.19/km^{2})
- Time zone: UTC-6 (Central (CST))
  - Summer (DST): UTC-5 (CDT)
- ZIP code: 38068
- Area code: 901
- FIPS code: 47-69620
- GNIS feature ID: 1303713
- Website: www.somervilletn.org

Somerville is a town in Fayette County, Tennessee, United States. It is part of the Memphis metropolitan area. The population was 3,415 at the 2020 census, up from 3,094 at the 2010 census. It is the county seat of Fayette County.

== History ==
The town was named to honor Lieutenant Robert Somerville, who was killed in 1814 during the Battle of Horseshoe Bend in central Alabama while serving under General Andrew Jackson. Somerville was incorporated in 1836.

== Geography ==
Somerville is located slightly northeast of the center of Fayette County at 35°14′15″N 89°21′30″W (35.237623, -89.358400). U.S. Route 64 runs through the center of town as Fayette Street, leading northeast 13 miles (21 km) to Whiteville and west 9 miles (14 km) to Oakland. Downtown Memphis is 41 miles (66 km) to the west. Tennessee State Route 76 crosses US 64 at the center of town. North of US 64, it is the town's Main Street and leads 26 miles (42 km) to Brownsville. To the south it is South Street, leading 13 miles (21 km) to Moscow.

According to the United States Census Bureau, the town has a total area of 11.4 square miles (30 km^{2}), of which 11.2 square miles (29 km^{2}) is land and 0.2 square miles (0.52 km^{2}) (1.58%) is water. The Loosahatchie River, a west-flowing tributary of the Mississippi, runs past the northern end of the town.

== Demographics ==
Historical population
Census	Pop.	Note	%±
1860	1,526		—
1870	954		−37.5%
1880	834		−12.6%
1890	892		7.0%
1900	777		−12.9%
1910	1,387		78.5%
1920	1,106		−20.3%
1930	1,333		20.5%
1940	1,570		17.8%
1950	1,760		12.1%
1960	1,820		3.4%
1970	1,816		−0.2%
1980	2,264		24.7%
1990	2,047		−9.6%
2000	2,519		23.1%
2010	3,094		22.8%
2020	3,415		10.4%

=== 2020 census ===
As of the 2020 census, Somerville had a population of 3,415. The median age was 44.6 years. 20.4% of residents were under the age of 18 and 24.2% were 65 years of age or older. For every 100 females there were 85.2 males, and for every 100 females age 18 and over there were 79.6 males.

Somerville racial composition
Race	Num.	Perc.
White (non-Hispanic)	1,860	54.47%
Black or African American (non-Hispanic)	1,280	37.48%
Native American	7	0.2%
Asian	14	0.41%
Other/Mixed	131	3.84%
Hispanic or Latino	123	3.6%

0.0% of residents lived in urban areas, while 100.0% lived in rural areas.

There were 1,463 households and 734 families in Somerville, and 25.8% of households had children under the age of 18 living in them. Of all households, 33.8% were married-couple households, 19.0% were households with a male householder and no spouse or partner present, and 42.6% were households with a female householder and no spouse or partner present. About 37.1% of all households were made up of individuals, and 17.4% had someone living alone who was 65 years of age or older.

There were 1,569 housing units, of which 6.8% were vacant. The homeowner vacancy rate was 2.5% and the rental vacancy rate was 4.7%.

=== 2000 census ===
As of the census of 2000, there were 2,519 people, 1,006 households, and 618 families residing in the town. The population density was 225.4 inhabitants per square mile (87.0/km^{2}). There were 1,070 housing units at an average density of 95.8 per square mile (37.0/km^{2}). The racial makeup of the town was 59.94% White, 39.38% African American, 0.08% Native American, 0.08% Asian, 0.04% from other races, and 0.48% from two or more races. Hispanic or Latino of any race were 0.24% of the population.

There were 1,006 households, out of which 27.9% had children under the age of 18 living with them, 39.3% were married couples living together, 19.8% had a female householder with no husband present, and 38.5% were non-families. 36.9% of all households were made up of individuals, and 19.6% had someone living alone who was 65 years of age or older. The average household size was 2.33 and the average family size was 3.08.

In the town, the population was spread out, with 24.3% under the age of 18, 10.0% from 18 to 24, 24.9% from 25 to 44, 20.0% from 45 to 64, and 20.8% who were 65 years of age or older. The median age was 39 years. For every 100 females, there were 84.7 males. For every 100 females age 18 and over, there were 76.6 males.

The median income for a household in the town was $21,225, and the median income for a family was $29,750. Males had a median income of $26,094 versus $22,768 for females. The per capita income for the town was $15,636. About 18.3% of families and 25.4% of the population were below the poverty line, including 29.0% of those under age 18 and 25.0% of those age 65 or over.

== Education ==
It is in the Fayette County School District.

== Notable people ==
- Chester R. Allen (1905–1972), Major general in the Marine Corps and former Quartermaster General
- Elizabeth Bolden (1890–2006), supercentenarian, world's oldest living person in 2006, died in Memphis
- William Herbert Brewster, Sr. (1897–1987), influential African American Baptist minister, composer, dramatist, singer, poet and community leader; he is considered to be one of the fathers of gospel music
- Pearl Dickson (1903–1977), Memphis and country blues singer and songwriter
- Sara Beaumont Kennedy (1859–1920), Memphis newspaper editor, writer
- Herb Parsons (1908–1959), considered by many to be the greatest exhibition shooter in history
- Thomas Rivers (1819–1863), U.S. representative from Tennessee
- Ingram Stainback (1883–1961), territorial governor of Hawaii; born in Somerville
- A. Langston Taylor (1890–1953), civil rights and labor activist; founder of Phi Beta Sigma
- William L. Wainwright (1947–2012), North Carolina politician
- Elvis Presley (1935–1977), his father and he owned a farm here.

== Gallery ==
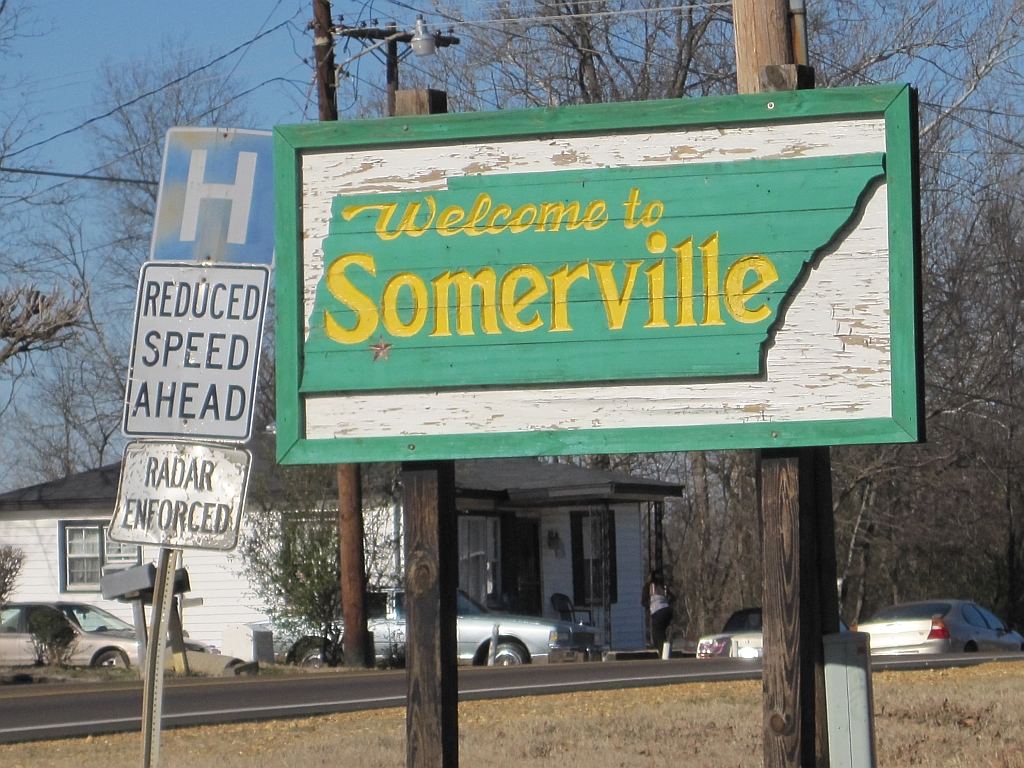

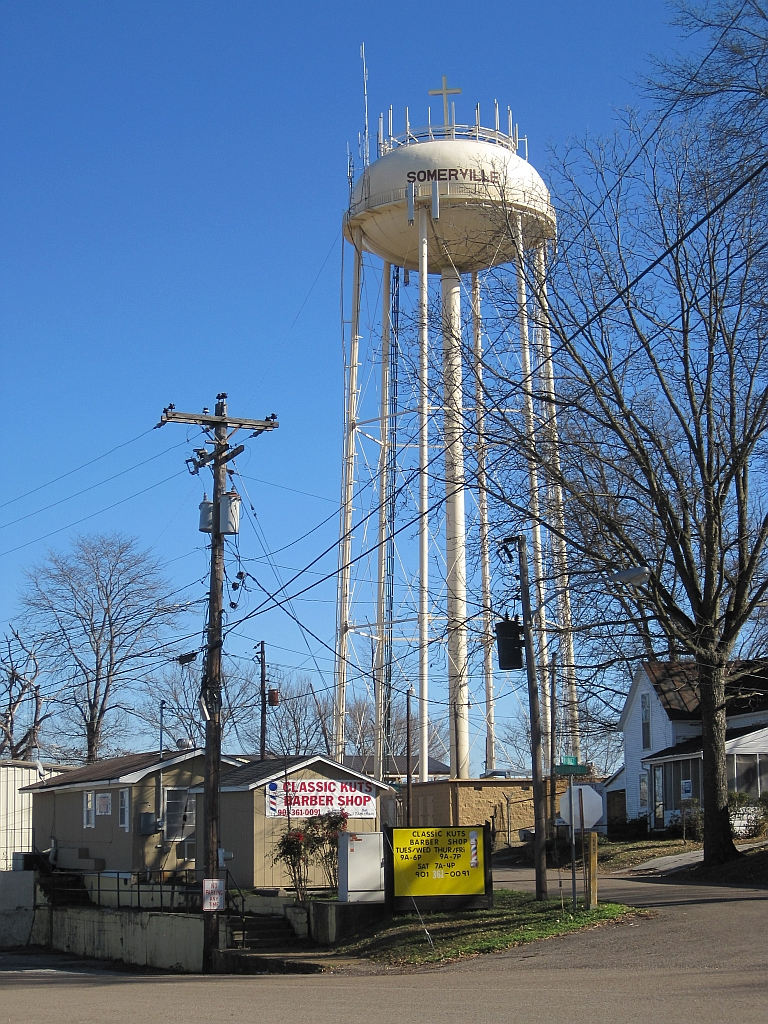

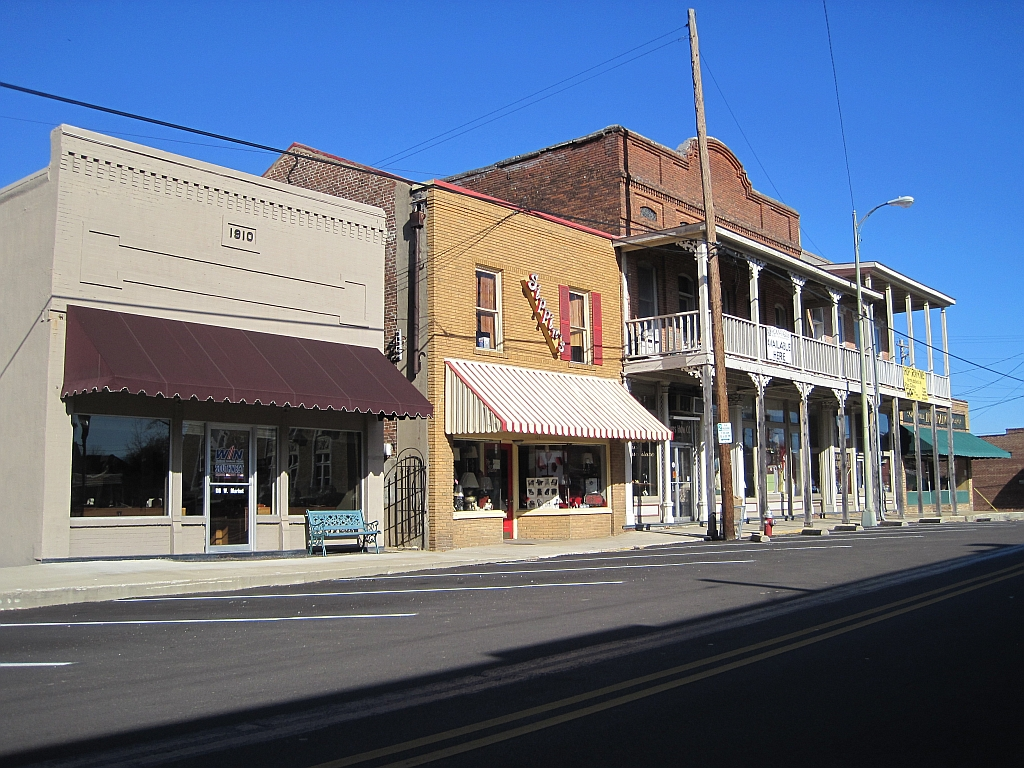

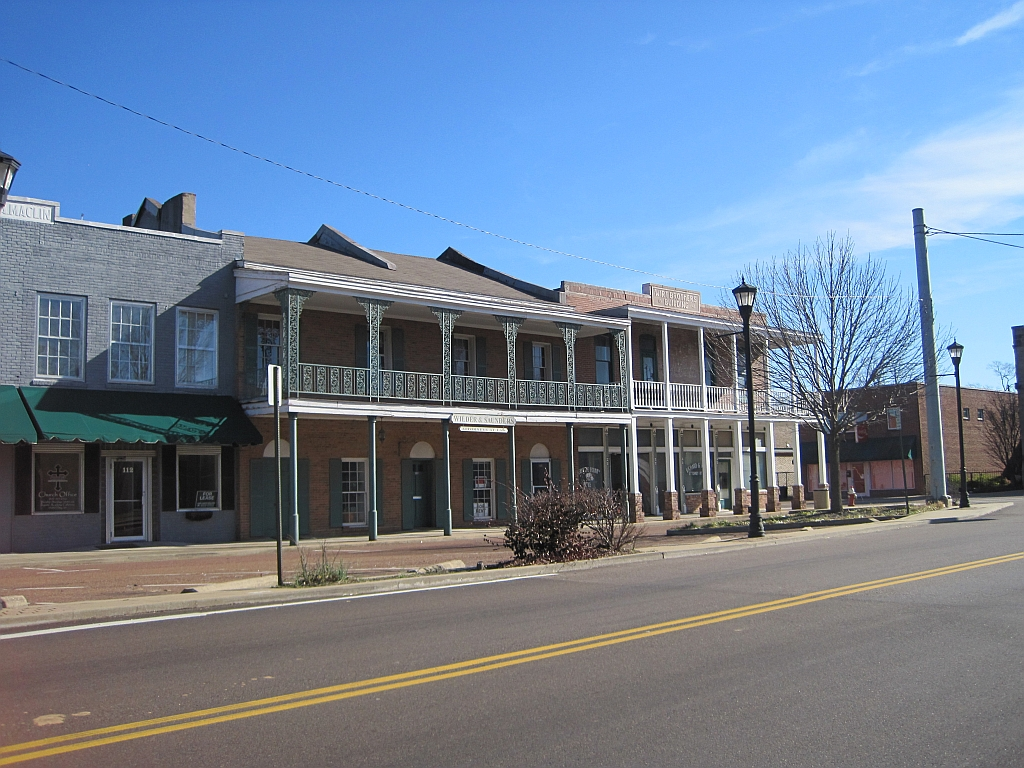

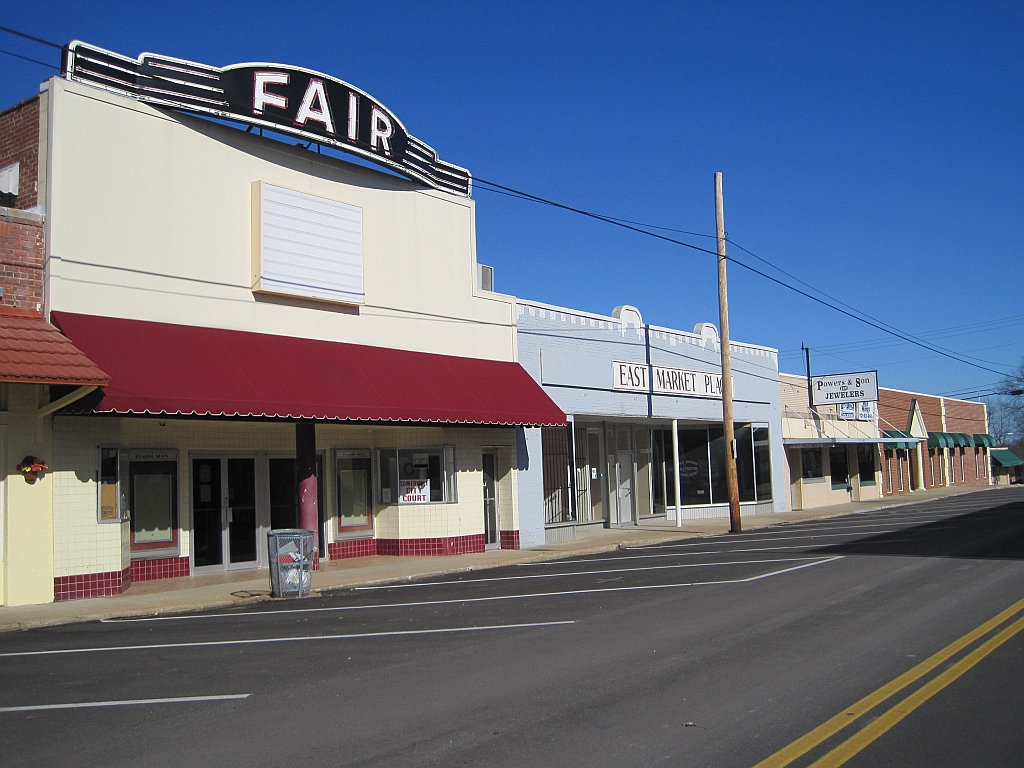

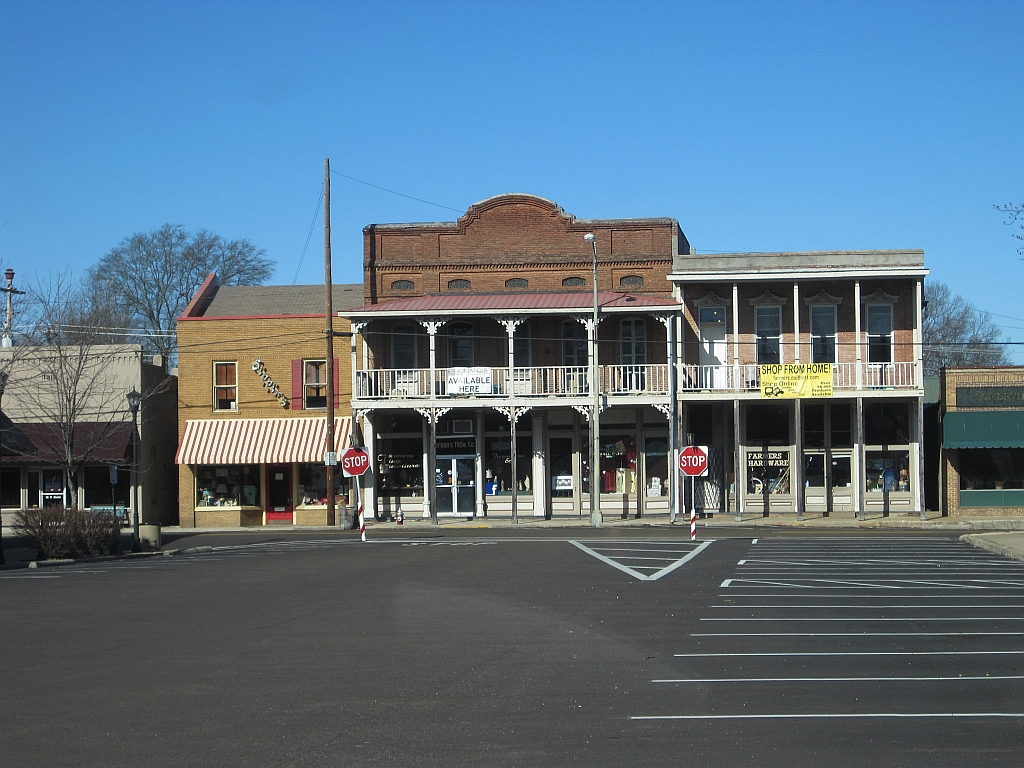
