= Tennessee State Route 205 =

State highway in Tennessee, United States

State Route 205
- SR 205 highlighted in red

Route information
- Maintained by TDOT
- Length: 35.7 mi (57.5 km)
- Existed: July 1, 1983–present

Major junctions
- South end: SR 57 in Collierville
- SR 193 in Fisherville; US 64 in Eads; I-40 in Arlington; US 70 / US 79 in Arlington; SR 14 in Rosemark
- North end: US 51 in Millington

Location
- Country: United States
- State: Tennessee
- Counties: Shelby

Highway system
- Tennessee State Routes; Interstate; US; State
← SR 204	→ SR 206

State Route 205 (SR 205) is a state highway in Shelby County, Tennessee.

== Route description ==
SR 205 begins in Collierville at SR 57 (locally known as East Poplar Avenue) and is known by the name Collierville-Arlington Road, as this is the main route between the two towns. It continues north through Collierville as four lanes until it reaches the Wolf River, where it becomes a two-lane road. It crosses the Wolf River at the only remaining non-channelized portion in Shelby County. Once out of Collierville, SR 205 passes through the unincorporated communities of Fisherville and Eads. It crosses SR 193 (known as Macon Road) and continues until US 64/SR 15.

North of US 64/SR 15, the road enters Arlington and becomes known as Airline Road. After passing over I-40, the route again becomes four lanes as it passes through the center of Arlington. It intersects US 70/US 79/SR 1 and follows it briefly to the east until it branches off and continues northward as a two-lane road. It is once again known as Collierville-Arlington Road as it crosses the Loosahatchie River. At an intersection, SR 205 turns left onto Millington-Arlington Road as Collierville-Arlington Road continues north until the Tipton County line where it continues as Hughes Road.

SR 205 goes west from this junction and continues through the unincorporated town of Rosemark, where it crosses SR 14 (Austin Peay Highway). It then continues until it intersects Armour Road. SR 205 turns south briefly on this road until it goes west again and it becomes known as Navy Road. From here, it once again becomes four lanes and passes through Naval Support Activity Mid-South and Downtown Millington. SR 205 terminates at the intersection of US 51/SR 3 and Navy Road. The road continues as Martha Road into a subdivision.

== History ==
SR 205 has been realigned and redesigned from Armour Road to Deadfall Road in order to straighten dangerous curves and join discontinuous sections. This portion of SR 205 carries a 50 miles per hour (80 km/h) speed limit.

Throughout the stretch between Arlington and Collierville, it is a narrow two-lane road with many dangerous curves that have contributed to several major accidents over the past few decades. Although it is a rural highway, the traffic volumes have increased on it due to people moving into the eastern part of the county. SR 385, (which has now become Interstate 269) was completed in November 2013 in order to bypass this road. After its opening, truck restrictions were placed on both SR 205 and SR 196.

== Major intersections ==
The entire route is in Shelby County.

Location	mi	km	Destinations	Notes
Collierville	0.0	0.0	SR 57 (E Poplar Avenue) – Germantown, Piperton	Southern terminus
Collierville	2.5– 2.6	4.0– 4.2	Bridge over the Wolf River	
Fisherville	8.2	13.2	SR 193 east (Macon Road) – Macon, Williston	Western terminus of SR 193
Eads	12.2	19.6	US 64 (SR 15) to I-269 – Bartlett, Lakeland, Hickory Withe, Oakland	
Arlington	16.1– 16.2	25.9– 26.1	I-40 – Memphis, Nashville	I-40 exit 25
Arlington	18.4	29.6	US 70 west / US 79 south (SR 1 west) to SR 385 – Lakeland, Bartlett	Southern end of US 70/US 79/SR 1 concurrency
Arlington	19.2	30.9	US 70 east / US 79 north (SR 1 east) – Gallaway, Braden, Mason	Northern end of US 70/US 79/SR 1 concurrency
Arlington	19.9– 20.0	32.0– 32.2	Bridge over the Loosahatchie River	
Rosemark	28.3	45.5	SR 14 (Austin Peay Highway) – Memphis, Covington	
Millington	35.7	57.5	US 51 (SR 3) to SR 385 – Memphis, Munford, Atoka	Northern terminus
1.000 mi = 1.609 km; 1.000 km = 0.621 mi: Concurrency terminus
