= Tennessee State Route 204 =

State highway in Tennessee, United States

State Route 204
- SR 204 highlighted in red

Route information
- Maintained by TDOT
- Length: 11.9 mi (19.2 km)
- Existed: July 1, 1983–present

Major junctions
- South end: I-40 in Memphis
- North end: Future I-269 / SR 385 near Millington

Location
- Country: United States
- State: Tennessee
- Counties: Shelby

Highway system
- Tennessee State Routes; Interstate; US; State
← SR 203	→ SR 205

State Route 204 (SR 204) is a state highway in Shelby County, Tennessee, United States, that connects Memphis and Millington.

== Route description ==
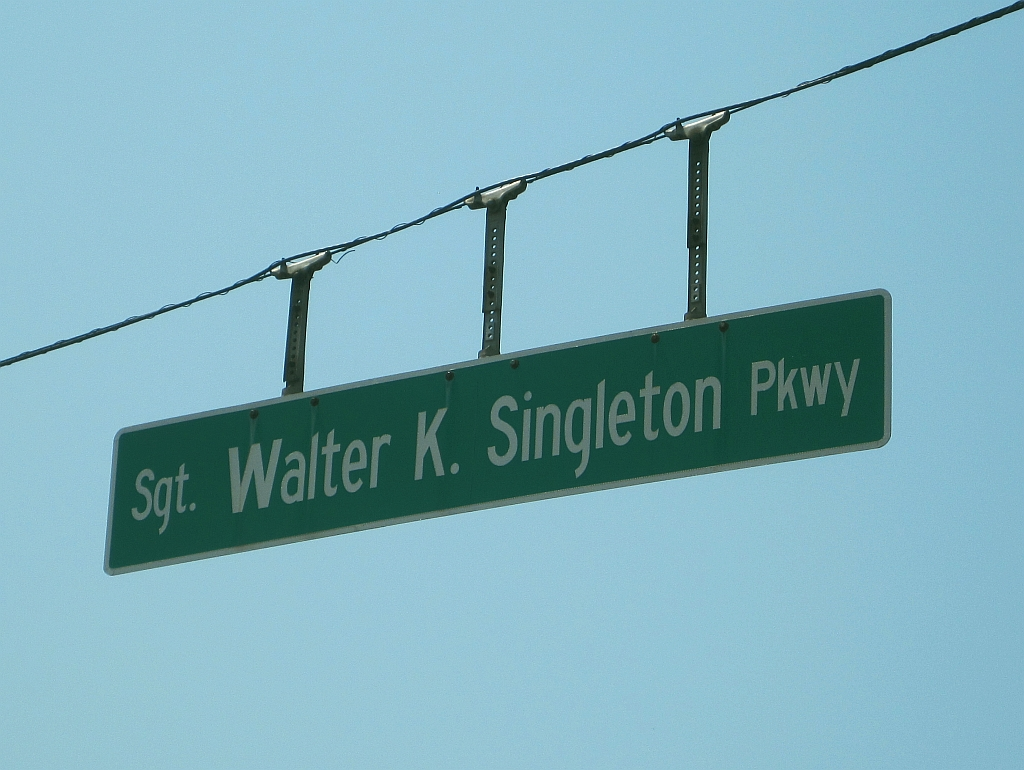
Sign for the Sgt Walter K Singleton Parkway, June 2012

SR 204 starts at the intersection of Stratford Road and Macon Road in Memphis, about a mile (south of Interstate 40 (I‑40). The road (locally known as Covington Pike), passes over the Wolf River after its interchange with I‑40. Between here and Raleigh–Lagrange Road are numerous car dealerships; Covington Pike is best known regionally for this. SR 204 continues north into the Memphis neighborhood of Raleigh, crossing SR 15 (Stage Road) and SR 14 (Austin Peay Highway). At this intersection, SR 204 changes into Sgt. Walter K. Singleton Parkway (Singleton Parkway), a four-lane divided highway with a 55-mile-per-hour (89 km/h) speed limit. This route was named for Walter K. Singleton, a Memphis native, who was posthumously awarded the Medal of Honor as a result of the Vietnam War. This is one of the main routes for residents who commute from Millington to Memphis. After passing over the Loosahatchie River, SR 204 ends at SR 385 (Paul Barret Parkway—future I&8209;269). Singleton Parkway continues north into Naval Support Activity Mid-South and further on to SR 205 (Navy Road) in Millington, ending on the east side of the Millington-Memphis Airport. However, the base is closed to through traffic, so through traffic must go onto SR 385 in order to go to Millington.

== History ==
Up until the 1970s, Covington Pike ran from Raleigh–Lagrange Road to just south of its current junction with Austin Peay Highway (SR 14). However, instead of taking a turn towards the west along the current route, Covington Pike continued north and crossed Austin Peay Highway north of where it does today. Covington Pike crossed over SR 14 several times in somewhat discontinuous sections, over the Loosahatchie River, and past the community of Rosemark. In theory, one could get to Covington (about 40 miles [64 km] north of Memphis) by having traveled this route as its name suggests. Once in Tipton County, the route is known as Old Memphis Road (or Old Brighton Road in the city of Covington), which is more continuous and still goes from the Tipton County line to Covington. Today, segments of the old Covington Pike still exist, but are mainly dead ends.

Singleton Parkway was built in the 1970s from Austin Peay to Egypt Central Road, and was extended north to Millington in the 1980s.

== Major intersections ==
The entire route is in Shelby County.

Location	mi	km	Destinations	Notes
Memphis	0.0	0.0	I-40 – Little Rock, Jackson	Southern terminus; road continues south as Covington Pike; I&8209;40 Exit 10
Raleigh, Memphis			SR 15 (Stage Road) – Bartlett, Frayser	
Raleigh, Memphis			SR 14 (Austin Peay Highway) – Rosemark, Memphis	
Millington	11.9	19.2	SR 385 – Arlington, Millington	Northern terminus; road continues north to Naval Support Activity Mid-South; future I&8209;269
1.000 mi = 1.609 km; 1.000 km = 0.621 mi

== See also ==
- List of state routes in Tennessee
- List of highways numbered 204
