= Tennessee State Route 59 =

Highway in Tennessee

State Route 59
- SR 59; primary in red, secondary in blue

Route information
- Maintained by TDOT
- Length: 50.83 mi (81.80 km)
- Existed: October 1, 1923–present

Major junctions
- West end: Mississippi River near Randolph
- US 51 in Covington; SR 54 in Covington; SR 14 east of Brighton; US 70 / US 79 in Macon; I-40 in Braden
- East end: SR 76 north of Somerville

Location
- Country: United States
- State: Tennessee
- Counties: Tipton, Fayette

Highway system
- Tennessee State Routes; Interstate; US; State
← SR 58	→ SR 60

State Route 59 (SR 59) is a state highway in Tennessee. It runs from the Mississippi River to just north of Somerville passing through Tipton and Fayette counties. Excluding the portion where it is concurrent with US 51 in Covington, which is 4-lane highway (both divided and undivided), it is a two-lane rural highway throughout its length and carries a 55-mile-per-hour (89 km/h) speed limit except when it passes through towns, in which case this speed limit can be significantly less.

== Route description ==
=== Tipton County ===
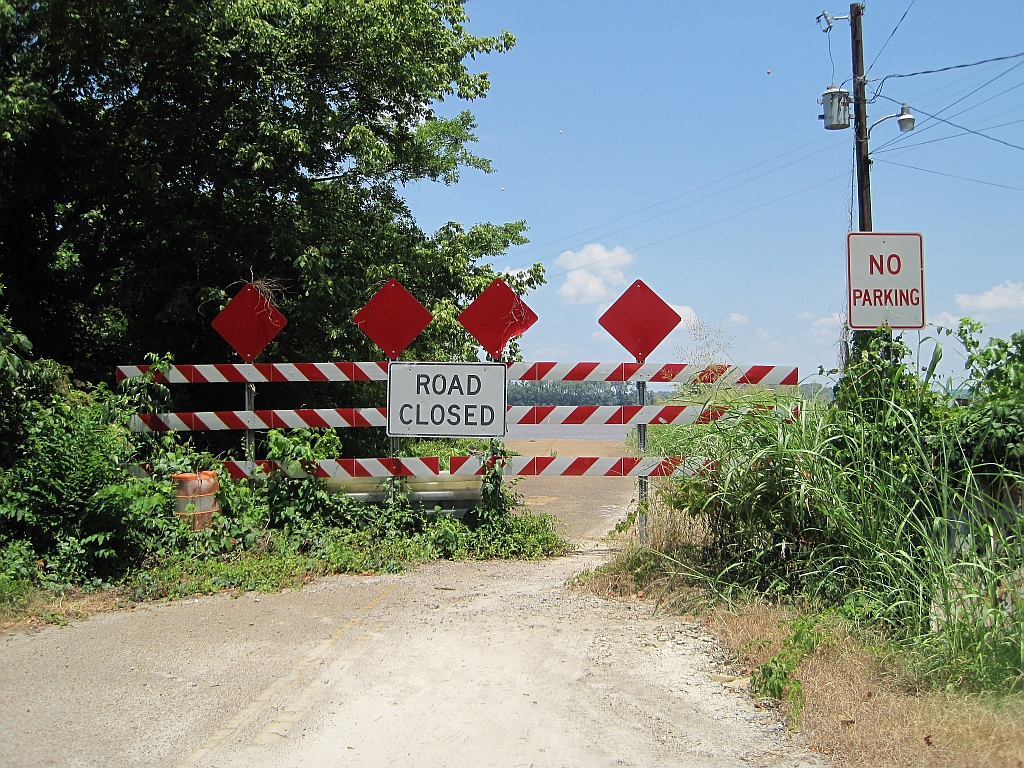
Western Terminus of SR 59

SR 59 begins as a secondary highway at the Mississippi River in Tipton County in an area known as Richardson Landing. The route used to extend about 200 feet (61 m) further, but has since been eroded by the river, so much that barricades block the edge of the pavement to prevent motorists from driving into the river (See photo at left). As one continues east along the highway, one will notice that the elevation increases from around 250 to 400 feet (76 to 122 m) above sea level in less than two miles (3.2 km). This sharp increase is due to what is known as the second Chickasaw Bluff, a formation created by wind-blown silt which has accumulated from around the last Ice Age. At the top of this bluff is the small community of Randolph, which was important during the American Civil War and at one time was bigger than Memphis, 40 miles (64 km) down the river.

Continuing eastward from the bluffs, the road starts to level out into gently rolling farmland. SR 178 (via a Y-Intersection) intersects SR 59 in the town of Gilt Edge. SR 59 then passes through the towns of Burlison and Garland before it enters the city of Covington (as W Liberty Avenue) and passes through some neighborhoods before becoming concurrent with US 51/SR 3 in downtown, becoming a primary highway. They then have an intersection with SR 54 (one-way pair between W Liberty Avenue and W Pleasant Avenue) before going south as they leave downtown and travel through some neighborhoods before SR 59 splits off and goes east along Mueller Brass Road. It has an intersection and becomes concurrent with SR 384 (S College Street; where it becomes Hastings Way) before the highway makes a right turn at an intersection where SR 59 goes southeast to leave Covington while SR 384 turns north towards downtown (S Main Street).

SR 59 passes through farmland and crosses SR 14 shortly afterwards. It continues to the town of Mason and joins US 70/US 79/SR 1. It is on this portion of the highway in which a wrong-way concurrency occurs. SR 59 is traveling southwest, is signed as "East 59", while US 70 is signed as westbound and US 79 is signed as northbound. The same is true for motorists heading in the other direction. The highway then crosses into Fayette County.

The portion between Covington and Mason is named George D. Gracey Highway.

=== Fayette County ===
SR 59 separates from the US highways in Braden and continues in a southeast direction. It has an interchange with I-40 (Exit 35) south of Braden shortly before it has an intersection with SR 194 and begins to parallel the course of the Loosahatchie River (which it does for the remainder of its length). It then has a Y-Intersection with SR 222 shortly before SR 59 comes to an end at a Y-Intersection with SR 76 just a few miles north of Somerville.

== Major intersections ==
County	Location	mi	km	Destinations	Notes
Tipton				Dead end at Mississippi River	Western terminus of SR 59; begins as a secondary highway
Tipton				Richardson Landing Road / Great River Road south	Great River Road continues south to SR 388
Tipton	Gilt Edge			SR 178 south (Munford Giltedge Road) – Munford	Northern terminus of SR 178
Tipton	Covington			US 51 north (Highway 51 N/SR 3) / Great River Road north – Dyersburg	Western end of US 51/SR 3 concurrency; becomes a primary highway
Tipton	Covington			SR 54 east (W Liberty Avenue/W Pleasant Avenue)	Western terminus of SR 54; one-way pair between W Liberty Avenue and W Pleasant Avenue
Tipton	Covington			US 51 south (Highway 51 S/SR 3) – Memphis	Eastern end of US 51/SR 3 concurrency
Tipton	Covington			SR 384 south (S College Street)	Western end of SR 384 concurrency
Tipton	Covington			SR 384 north (S Main Street)	Eastern end of SR 384 concurrency
Tipton				SR 14 (Austin Peay Highway) – Rosemark, Brownsville	
Tipton	Mason			US 70 east / US 79 north (SR 1) – Stanton	Western end of US 70/US 79/SR 1 wrong-way concurrency
Fayette	Braden			US 70 west / US 79 south (SR 1) – Arlington	Eastern end of US 70/US 79/SR 1 wrong-way concurrency
Fayette				I-40 – Memphis, Nashville	I-40 exit 35
Fayette				SR 194 south – Oakland	Northern terminus of SR 194
Fayette				SR 222 north (Stanton Road) – Stanton	Southern terminus of SR 222
Fayette				SR 76 – Somerville, Brownsville	Eastern terminus of SR 59; ends as a primary highway
1.000 mi = 1.609 km; 1.000 km = 0.621 mi: Concurrency terminus
