= Tennessee State Route 384 =

Highway in Tennessee

State Route 384
- TN 384 highlighted in red

Route information
- Maintained by TDOT
- Length: 11.3 mi (18.2 km)
- Existed: July 1, 1983–present

Major junctions
- South end: SR 14 in southern Tipton County
- SR 59 in Covington; SR 54 in Covington
- North end: US 51 in Covington

Location
- Country: United States
- State: Tennessee
- Counties: Tipton

Highway system
- Tennessee State Routes; Interstate; US; State
← SR 383	→ SR 385

State Route 384 (SR 384) is a 11.3-mile-long (18.2 km) north-south state highway in Tipton County, Tennessee.

== Route description ==
SR 384 begins in the southern part of the county at an intersection with SR 14 (Austin Peay Highway). It heads north as Mount Carmel Road along a two-lane highway through farmland for several miles before entering Covington at an intersection with SR 59 (Hastings Way). The highway turns east along a concurrency with SR 59 before splitting off and turning north along S Main Street. SR 384 passes through some neighborhoods before turning right onto East Street. It becomes a four-lane undivided highway for a short distance before narrowing to two-lanes and bypassing downtown along its east side. The highway has an intersection with SR 54 (E Liberty Avenue), where it becomes Hope Street, and begins passing through industrial areas, where it turns west onto Industrial Road N. SR 384 comes to an end shortly thereafter at an intersection with US 51 (SR 3).

== Major intersections ==
The entire route is in Tipton County.

Location	mi	km	Destinations	Notes
	0.0	0.0	SR 14 (Austin Peay Highway) – Rosemark, Brownsville	Southern terminus
Covington			SR 59 west (Hastings Way) – Gilt Edge, Burlison	Southern end of SR 59 concurrency
Covington			SR 59 east (S Main Street) – Mason, Braden	Northern end of SR 59 concurrency
Covington			SR 54 (E Liberty Street) – Downtown, Brownsville	
Covington	11.3	18.2	US 51 (SR 3) – Brighton, Henning	Northern terminus
1.000 mi = 1.609 km; 1.000 km = 0.621 mi: Concurrency terminus
