= Tennessee State Route 14 =

State highway in Tennessee, United States

State Route 14
- Austin Peay Highway
- SR 14; primary in red, unsigned in green

Route information
- Maintained by TDOT
- Length: 55.37 mi (89.11 km)
- Existed: October 1, 1923–present

Major junctions
- South end: US 61 at the Mississippi State Line in Memphis
- I-55 in Memphis; US 61 / US 64 / US 70 / US 79 (E.H. Crump Blvd.) in Memphis; I-40 in Memphis; US 51 (Thomas Street) in Memphis; I-40 / Future I-69 / I-240 in Memphis; I-40 / I-240 in Memphis; Future I-269 (Barret Pkwy.) / SR 385 near Rosemark
- North end: SR 54 near Covington

Location
- Country: United States
- State: Tennessee
- Counties: Shelby, Tipton

Highway system
- Tennessee State Routes; Interstate; US; State
← SR 13	→ SR 15

State Route 14 (SR 14) is a south–north route from the Mississippi border in Memphis, Tennessee to an intersection with State Route 54 (SR 54) in Tipton County.

== Route description ==
Map showing the route of SR 14 through downtown Memphis.

=== Shelby County ===
SR 14 begins concurrent to US 61 at the Mississippi state line in Shelby County. US 61 and SR 14 travel northward, passing several subdivisions before entering Memphis (as S Third Street) and having an intersection with SR 175. It then goes through some more neighborhoods before passing through a business district, crossing a railroad overpass and having an interchange with I-55 (Exit 7). US 61/SR 14 then pass through some more neighborhoods before coming to an intersection with E.H. Crump Boulevard (US 64/US 70/US 78/US 79/SR 1), at which point US 61 turns west along E.H. Crump Boulevard to become concurrent with I-55 and cross the Mississippi River into Arkansas while SR 14 continues north on S Third Street to become concurrent with US 64/US 70/US 79/SR 1 and enter downtown. Up until this point, SR 14 is unsigned. The concurrency passes through downtown as a one-way pair of Second and Third Streets, where they have an intersection with SR 278 and the former route of US 78 (Doctor M.L.K. Jr Avenue), before US 64/US 70/US 79/SR 1 turns east along Union Avenue. SR 14 then becomes concurrent with SR 3, and they continue through downtown before having an interchange with I-40 (Exit 1A). They then leave downtown and come to an intersection with A.W. Willis Avenue, where SR 14 turns east to follow that Street to an intersection with Danny Thomas Blvd (US 51/SR 4) and North Parkway (SR 1), while SR 3 continues north along Second and Third Streets. SR 14 then turns north along that route for a short distance before turning east onto Jackson Avenue as a lone route. On Jackson Avenue, SR 14 passes through the "North Memphis" neighborhood and has another interchange with I-40 (Exit 1F). It then continues through the neighborhood and passes by an industrial area before having its third and final interchange with I-40 (Exit 8 eastbound, Exit 8 A/B westbound) and transitioning from Jackson Avenue to Austin Peay Highway as it enters the neighborhood of Raleigh. SR 14 then widens to an 8-lane freeway and has interchanges with Old Austin Peay Highway, SR 15 (James Road), and another with Old Austin Peay Highway before narrowing back down to 4-lanes and enters a business district. The highway then continues to an intersection with SR 204 (Covington Pike/Singleton Parkway) before leaving Memphis altogether and narrowing to a 2-lane highway with a 55 miles per hour (89 km/h) speed limit. It then has an interchange with SR 385 (Paul Barret Parkway) just north of the crossing of the Loosahatchie River. SR 14 then continues northeast to enter farmland and have an intersection with SR 205 in Rosemark before crossing into Tipton County.

SR 14's entire route within the city of Memphis, except through downtown, is at least 4-lanes wide.

=== Tipton County ===
The highway continues northeast through farmland as it widens to a 4-lane divided highway for short distance to have an intersection with SR 206 and then SR 384 before narrowing to 2-lanes again and passing through more farmland to have an intersection with SR 59. SR 14 then continues northeast to an intersection with SR 179 before continuing northeast to come to an end at an intersection with SR 54 in the tiny community of Cotton Lake, just before SR 54 crosses the Hatchie River.

== Future ==
The Tipton County portion from the Shelby County line to just the northeast of SR 384 is a four-lane divided highway. Long-term plans include expanding the Shelby County portion to at least four lanes as well. Construction is currently underway on this expansion between Kerrville-Rosemark Road and the Tipton County line.

== Major intersections ==
The mileposts listed in the following table is only an estimated calculation. Actual mile markers may vary.

County	Location	mi	km	Destinations	Notes
Shelby	Memphis	0.0	0.0	US 61 south – Tunica, MS	Southern terminus; Mississippi state line; southern end of US 61 concurrency; continuation into Mississippi
Shelby	Memphis	2.14	3.44	SR 175 west (Weaver Road)	Southern end of SR 175 concurrency
Shelby	Memphis	2.91	4.68	SR 175 east (East Shelby Drive)	Northern end of SR 175 councurency
Shelby	Memphis	7.27– 7.60	11.70– 12.23	I-55 – Jackson Miss, St. Louis	I-55 exit 7
Shelby	Memphis	10.6	17.1	US 61 north / US 64 west / US 70 west / US 79 south (E.H. Crump Boulevard/SR 1 west)	Northern end of US 61 concurrency; southern end of US 64/US 70/US 79/SR 1 concurrency
Shelby	Memphis	11.5	18.5	SR 278 east (Doctor M.L.K. Jr Avenue)	Western terminus of SR 278
Shelby	Memphis	11.9	19.2	US 64 east / US 70 east / US 79 north (Union Avenue/SR 1 east/SR 3 south)	Northern end of US 64/US 70/US 79/SR 1 concurrency; southern end of SR 3 concurrency
Shelby	Memphis	12.6	20.3	I-40 – Nashville, Little Rock, AR	I-40 Exit 1A
Shelby	Memphis	12.9	20.8	SR 3 north (Second/Third Streets)	Northern end of SR 3 concurrency
Shelby	Memphis	13.3	21.4	US 51 south (Danny Thomas Boulevard/SR 1 west/SR 4 east) / SR 1 east (North Parkway)	Southern end of US 51/SR 4 concurrency
Shelby	Memphis	13.4	21.6	US 51 north (Danny Thomas Boulevard/SR 4 west)	Northern end of US 51/SR 4 concurrency
Shelby	Memphis	14.3– 14.5	23.0– 23.3	I-40 – Little Rock, AR, Nashville	I-40 exit 1F
Shelby	Memphis	20.7– 21.1	33.3– 34.0	I-40 – Little Rock, AR, Nashville	I-40 exit 8 eastbound, exit 8 A/B westbound; south end of freeway
Shelby	Memphis	21.2	34.1	Old Austin Peay Highway	Interchange
Shelby	Memphis	21.6	34.8	SR 15 east (James Road)	Western terminus of SR 15; interchange
Shelby	Memphis	21.9– 22.2	35.2– 35.7	Old Austin Peay Highway	Interchange; north end of freeway
Shelby	Memphis	24.3	39.1	SR 204 (Covington Pike/Singleton Parkway) – Naval Support Activity Mid-South	
Shelby		30.9	49.7	SR 385 (Paul Barret Parkway) – Millington, Arlington	future I-269; no exit number signed
Shelby	Rosemark	33.9	54.6	SR 205 (Millington Arlington Road) – Millington, Arlington	
Tipton		41.6	66.9	SR 206 north (Atoka Idaville Road) – Atoka, Munford	Southern terminus of SR 206
Tipton		44.5	71.6	SR 384 north (Mount Carmel Road) – Covington	Southern terminus of SR 384
Tipton		48.9	78.7	SR 59 – Covington, Mason, Somerville	
Tipton		51.8	83.4	SR 179 – Covington, Stanton	
Tipton		55.37	89.11	SR 54 – Covington, Brownsville	Northern terminus
1.000 mi = 1.609 km; 1.000 km = 0.621 mi: Concurrency terminus
