= Barretville, Tennessee =

- Unincorporated community
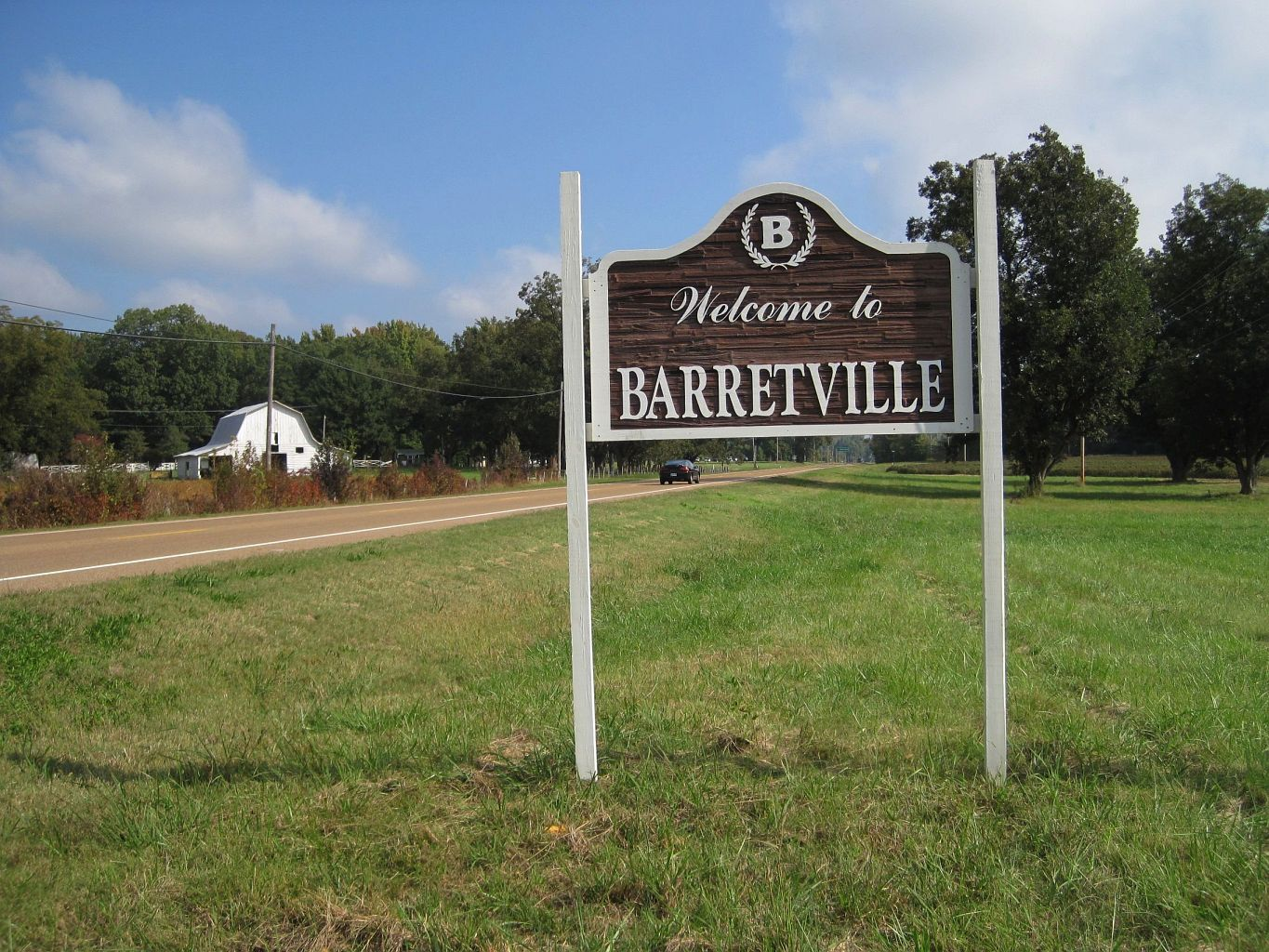
- The welcome sign in Barretville

- Location within Tennessee Location within the United States
- Coordinates: 35°22′25″N 89°45′48″W
- Country: United States
- State: Tennessee
- County: Shelby
- Elevation: 354 ft (108 m)
- Time zone: UTC-6 (Central (CST))
  - Summer (DST): UTC-5 (CDT)
- Area code: 901
- GNIS feature ID: 1276385

Barretville is an unincorporated community in Shelby County, Tennessee, United States, close to the border of Tipton County, and near the community of Rosemark. It has an elevation of 354 feet. The community is locally known for its once large number of domesticated peacocks, originally cared for by Sarah Louisa Barret.

== Name ==
Barretville is named after the Barret family, one of the earliest families to reside in the area. A census of Civil War veterans that was conducted in 1890 showed a man by the name of Joseph Barret living in the area, while the 1870 United States census showed multiple individuals of the family living in the community. Unlike the later 1890 census, the individuals listed in the 1870 census were noted with the spelling as Barrett, with an additional "t".

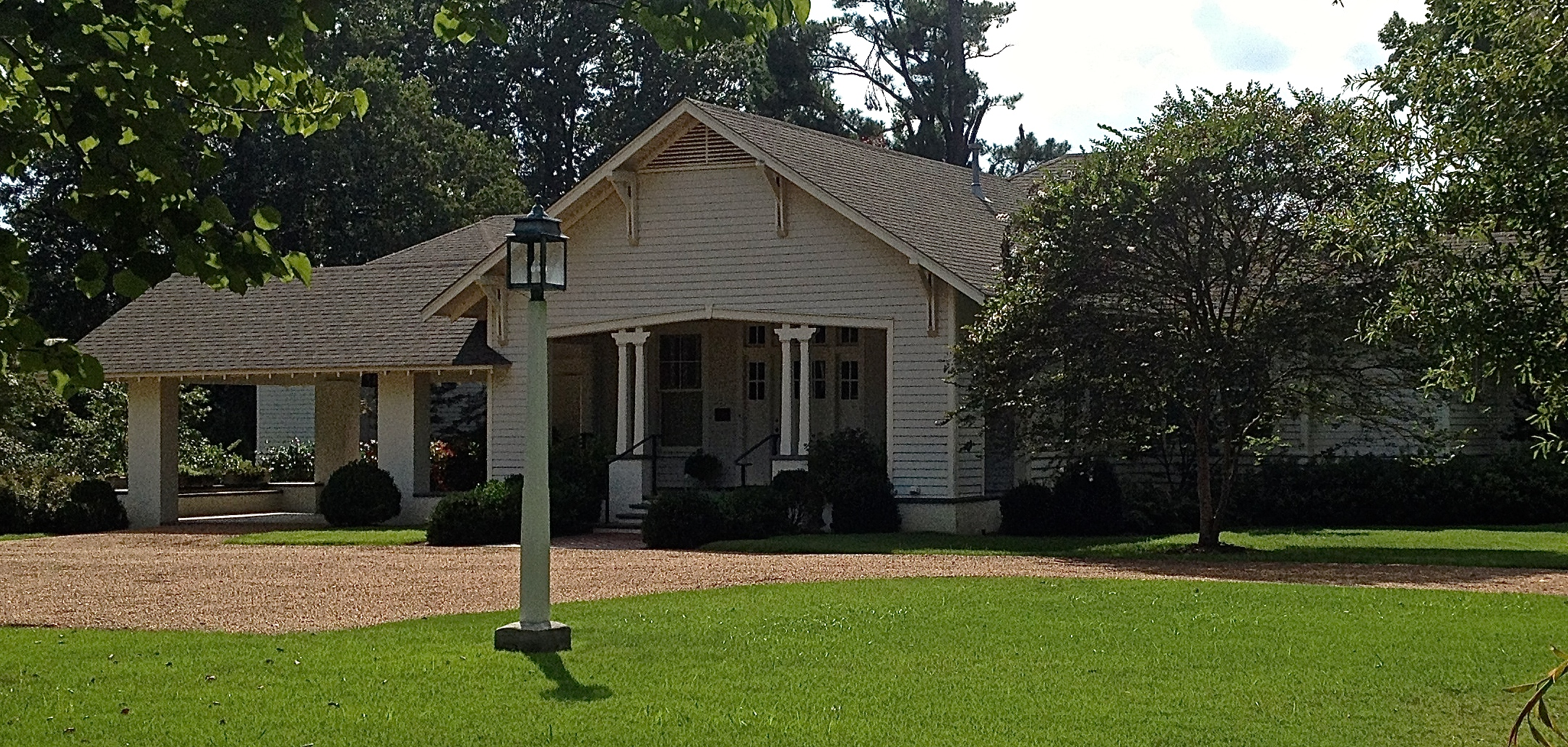
Squire's Rest, the home of Paul Weisinger Barret Sr. in Barretville, Tennessee

== History ==
The town was founded by Anthony Barret (1827–1910) in 1852. Anthony's grandson Paul Weisinger Barret Sr. (1899–1976) founded the Barretville Bank and Trust, which continues to be a focal point of the community today. Paul W. Barret Sr. founded the bank in 1920, at the age of only 21. Despite his young age, Barret successfully led the bank through the Great Depression, and later molded it into one of the largest and most successful rural banks in Tennessee. The bank had 10 branches in Shelby County alone, with affiliate banks in Somerville, Rossville, and Henderson, Tennessee. Paul Barret's home in Barretville is known as Squire's Rest, and is on the National Register of Historic Places.

=== 1930 Bank Robbery ===
In 1930, there was an attempted robbery at the Barretville Bank and Trust. At the time, the bank and the J. H. Barret and Sons General Store were connected. When burglars attempted to crack the bank's safe using blowtorches, the General Store was accidentally ignited; the robbery was unsuccessful, and the store was rebuilt later that year.

== Today ==
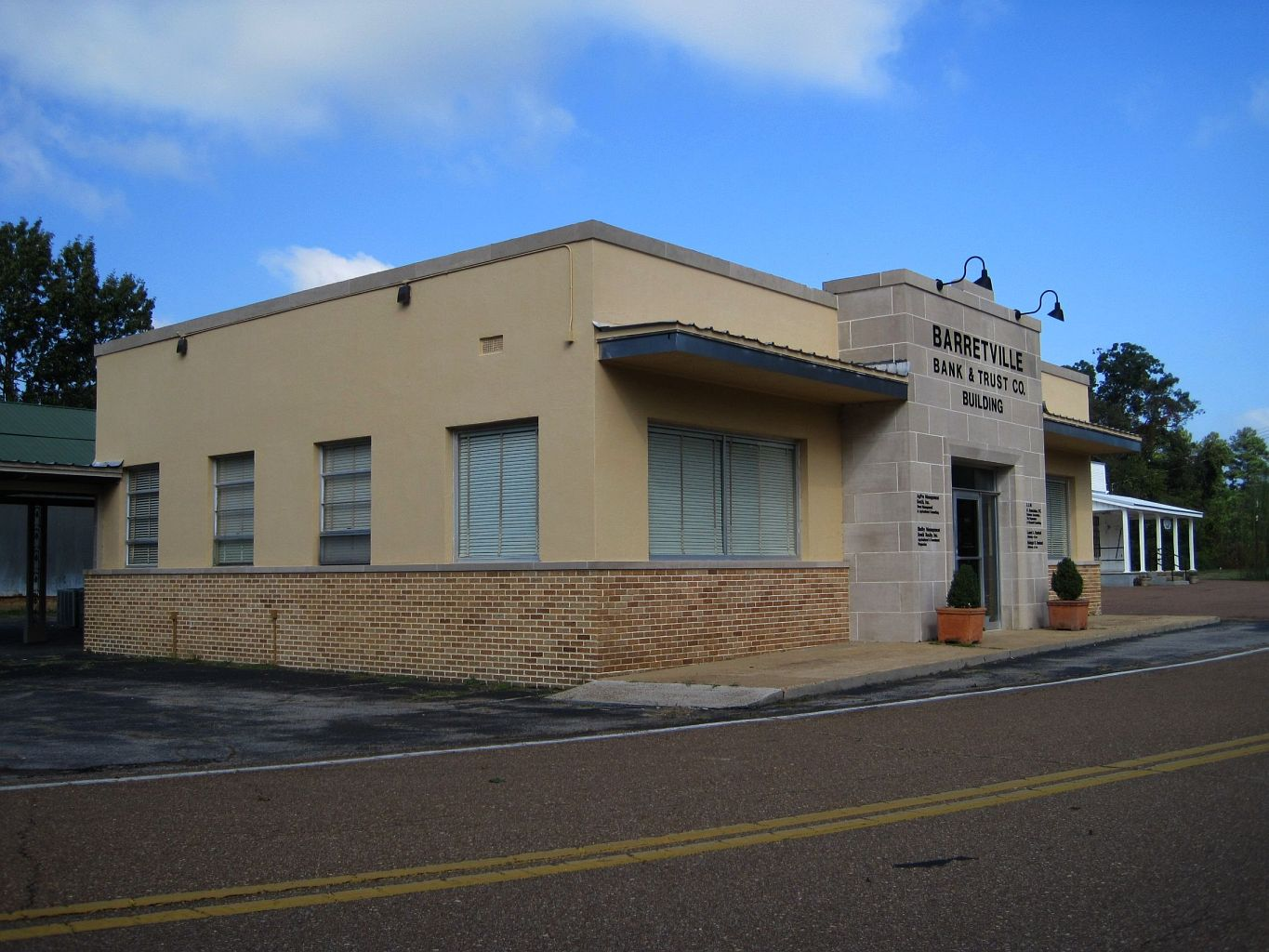
The old Barretville Bank and Trust Building

Today, the community consists of an antiques shop, a Trustmark Bank, several barns, an attorney's office (located in the old Barretville Bank and Trust Building), and multiple residences. The community is adjacent to Tennessee State Route 14. Tipton-Rosemark Academy's Paul Barret Jr. Sportsplex (constructed with money donated by the estate of Paul W. Barret Jr.) is just outside the community across Gragg Road.

== Notable people ==
- Bobby Blue Bland, blues singer, helped create the soul-blues sound
