= List of highways numbered 205 =

Route 205 or Highway 205 may refer to:

== Canada ==
- Manitoba Provincial Road 205
- New Brunswick Route 205
- Newfoundland and Labrador Route 205
- Nova Scotia Route 205
- Prince Edward Island Route 205
- Quebec Route 205

== China ==
- China National Highway 205

== Costa Rica ==
- National Route 205

== India ==
- National Highway 205 (India)

== Japan ==
- Japan National Route 205

== Thailand ==
- Thailand Route 205 (Suranarai Road)

== United Kingdom ==
- A205 road
- B205 road

== United States ==
- Interstate 205
- Alabama State Route 205
- Connecticut Route 205
- Florida State Road 205 (former)
- Georgia State Route 205 (former)
- Indiana State Road 205
- Iowa Highway 205 (former)
- K-205 (Kansas highway)
- Kentucky Route 205
- Maine State Route 205
- M-205 (Michigan highway) (former)
- Montana Secondary Highway 205
- New Mexico State Road 205
- New York State Route 205
- North Carolina Highway 205
- Ohio State Route 205
- Oregon Route 205
- Pennsylvania Route 205 (former)
- Tennessee State Route 205
- Texas State Highway 205
  - Texas State Highway Loop 205
- Utah State Route 205 (former)
- Virginia State Route 205

Territories

- Puerto Rico Highway 205

Preceded by 204	Lists of highways 205	Succeeded by 206
