= Tennessee State Route 206 =

State highway in Tennessee, United States

State Route 206
- SR 206 highlighted in red

Route information
- Maintained by TDOT
- Length: 7.6 mi (12.2 km)
- Existed: July 1, 1983–present

Major junctions
- South end: SR 14 near Atoka
- US 51 on Atoka-Munford city line
- North end: SR 178 in Munford

Location
- Country: United States
- State: Tennessee
- Counties: Tipton

Highway system
- Tennessee State Routes; Interstate; US; State
← SR 205	→ SR 207

State Route 206 (SR 206) is a 7.6-mile-long (12.2 km) north–south state highway in Tipton County, Tennessee. Even though it is signed north–south, SR 206 goes almost completely east–west.

== Route description ==
SR 206 begins at an intersection with SR 14, where it heads northwest, then west, along Atoka Idaville Road through farmland and rural areas. It then enters Atoka, where it passes through neighborhoods before turning north along Main Street to pass through downtown. The highway turns west again along Atoka Munford Road as it passes through a business district before coming to an intersection with US 51/SR 3. SR 206 then immediately crosses into Munford as Munford Avenue to by some businesses and several neighborhoods before entering downtown, where it comes to an end at an intersection with SR 178. The entire route of SR 206 is a two-lane highway.

== Major intersections ==
The entire route is in Tipton County.

Location	mi	km	Destinations	Notes
	0.0	0.0	SR 14 (Austin Peay Highway) – Rosemark, Covington, Brownsville	Southern terminus
Atoka–Munford line	6.1	9.8	US 51 (SR 3) – Millington, Brighton	
Munford	7.6	12.2	SR 178 (Tipton Street S/Church Street) – Gilt Edge, Millington	Northern terminus
1.000 mi = 1.609 km; 1.000 km = 0.621 mi
