= Tennessee State Route 178 =

State highway in Tennessee, United States

State Route 178
- SR 178 highlighted in red

Route information
- Maintained by TDOT
- Length: 11.5 mi (18.5 km)
- Existed: July 1, 1983–present

Major junctions
- South end: US 51 in Munford
- SR 206 in Munford
- North end: SR 59 in Gilt Edge

Location
- Country: United States
- State: Tennessee
- Counties: Tipton

Highway system
- Tennessee State Routes; Interstate; US; State
← SR 177	→ SR 179

State Route 178 (SR 178) is an 11.5-mile-long (18.5 km) north–south state highway in Tipton County, Tennessee. It connects the towns of Munford and Gilt Edge.

== Route description ==
SR 178 begins in Munford at an intersection with US 51/SR 3 and heads north through neighborhoods and subdivisions as Tipton Road. It then enters downtown along Tipton Street S, where it passes businesses before having an intersection with SR 206 (Munford Avenue). The highway then makes a left onto Main Street before turning right onto Munford Giltedge Road. SR 178 continues northeast to pass through neighborhoods before leaving Munford and winding its way northward through rural areas. It then enters Gilt Edge and comes to an end at a y-intersection with SR 59. The entire route of SR 178 is a two-lane highway.

== Major intersections ==
The entire route is in Tipton County.

Location	mi	km	Destinations	Notes
Munford	0.0	0.0	US 51 (SR 3) – Millington, Brighton	Southern terminus
Munford	2.0	3.2	SR 206 south (Munford Avenue) – Atoka	Northern terminus of SR 206
Gilt Edge	11.5	18.5	SR 59 – Randolph, Burlison, Covington	Northern terminus
1.000 mi = 1.609 km; 1.000 km = 0.621 mi
