= Walter K. Singleton =

Walter Keith Singleton
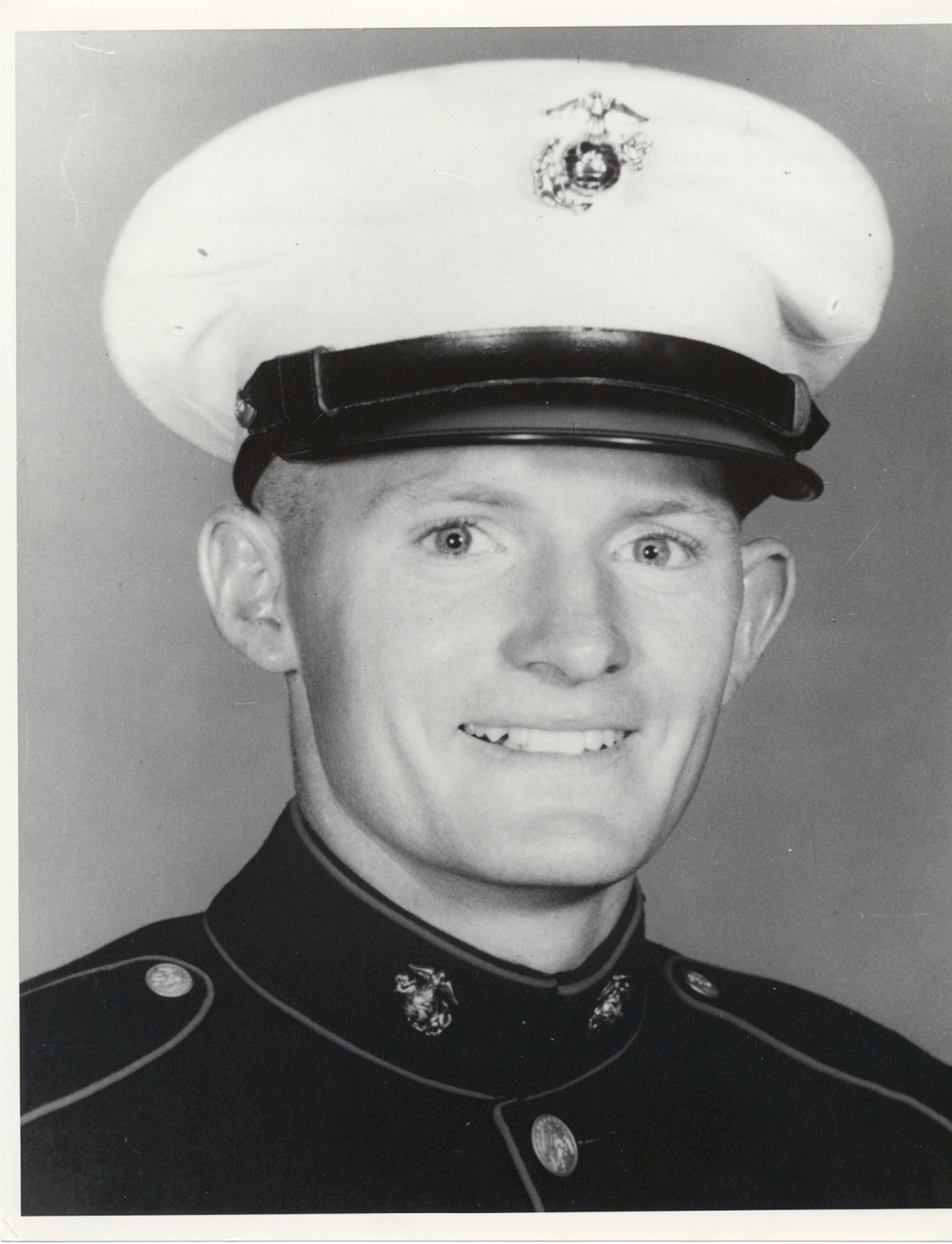
- Walter K. Singleton, Medal of Honor recipient
- Born: December 7, 1944; Memphis, Tennessee, U.S.
- Died: March 24, 1967 (aged 22); Gio Linh District, Quang Tri Province, South Vietnam
- Burial place: Memory Hill Gardens (now Memphis Memorial Gardens), Memphis, Tennessee
- Military career
- Allegiance: United States
- Branch: United States Marine Corps
- Service years: 1963–1967
- Rank: Sergeant
- Nickname: Zeke
- Units: Company A, 1st Battalion, 9th Marines, 3rd Marine Division
- Conflicts: Vietnam War: Operation Prairie III †
- Awards: Medal of Honor; Purple Heart Medal; Combat Action Ribbon

Walter Keith Singleton (December 7, 1944 – March 24, 1967) was a United States Marine Corps sergeant who was awarded the Medal of Honor posthumously by President Lyndon B. Johnson, for his actions above and beyond the call of duty in Vietnam on March 24, 1967, during the Vietnam War.

== Biography ==
Walter Keith Singleton was born on December 7, 1944, in Memphis, Tennessee, the son of Mr. and Mrs. George P. Singleton (when he was born during World War II, his father was a U.S. Army prisoner of war in Germany). He had two (three) brothers and four sisters. He graduated from Nicholas Blackwell High School (Bartlett High School) in Bartlett, Tennessee, in June 1963; while attending school, he ran track. He liked to hunt and fish with his father and was a member of the Future Farmers of America (FFA).

On August 1, 1963, he and his brother Bobby Jo, enlisted together in the U.S. Marine Corps Reserve at Memphis and integrated into the Regular Marine Corps the following September. Ordered to the Marine Corps Recruit Depot Parris Island, South Carolina, he completed recruit training with the 3rd Recruit Training Battalion in February 1964. He was promoted to private first class on March 1. Transferred to Marine Corps Base Camp Lejeune, North Carolina, he was assigned duty as an ammo-carrier with Company E, 2nd Battalion, 6th Marines, 2nd Marine Division until November 1965. While stationed at Camp Lejeune, he was promoted to lance corporal on October 1, 1964, and to corporal on August 1, 1965. In November, Corporal Singleton returned to the Marine Corps Recruit Depot at Parris Island and served as an instructor with the Weapons Training Battalion, Recruit Training Regiment, with the additional duty of training marksmanship to midshipmen at the U.S. Naval Academy, Annapolis, Maryland. While performing this additional duty, he received a letter of appreciation with a trophy for qualifying 100 percent of the officers-to-be.

Corporal Singleton (and his brother) was promoted to sergeant while serving in Okinawa on September 1, 1966. He was assigned to the 1st Battalion, 9th Marine Regiment and on November 13, he was assigned to Company A, 1st Battalion, 9th Marine Regiment, 3rd Marine Division as a supply sergeant. On December 11, he and his unit arrived in South Vietnam from Okinawa (under service regulations, only one brother was allowed to go to Vietnam). On March 24, 1967, the 1st Battalion, 9th Marines began Operation Prairie III; that same day, in the Gio Linh District, Quang Tri Province, Sergeant Singleton's Company A came under intense enemy fire at the village of Phu An. He was mortally wounded after advancing from his relatively safe position in the rear to help his company's lead platoon's medical corpsmen evacuate numerous wounded away from the enemy kill zone. Just before Singleton was killed by enemy fire, he managed to make a single-handed assault with a machine gun on the enemy's position and destroy it, killing eight and driving the remainder away. It was for these acts of bravery, which had saved several more of his comrades' lives, that he was awarded the Medal of Honor.

Singleton's parents, Mr. and Mrs. George P. Singleton, were presented their son's Medal of Honor on September 4, 1968, by the Secretary of the Navy Paul R. Ignatius during ceremonies at the Capital's Marine Corps Barracks, Washington, D.C.

== Military awards ==
Singleton's military decorations and awards:

Medal of Honor	Purple Heart Medal	Combat Action Ribbon
Marine Corps Good Conduct Medal	Navy Presidential Unit Citation	National Defense Service Medal
Vietnam Service Medal w/ one 3/16" bronze star	Republic of Vietnam Military Merit Medal	Republic of Vietnam Gallantry Cross w/ Palm
Republic of Vietnam Meritorious Unit Citation (Gallantry Cross) w/ Palm and Frame	Republic of Vietnam Meritorious Unit Citation (Civil Actions) w/ Palm and Frame	Republic of Vietnam Campaign Medal w/ 1960– device

=== Medal of Honor citation ===
Singleton's Medal of Honor Citation reads as follows:

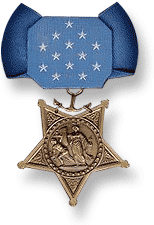

The President of the United States in the name of The Congress takes pride in presenting the MEDAL OF HONOR posthumously to

SERGEANT WALTER K. SINGLETON
UNITED STATES MARINE CORPS

for service as outlined in the following
CITATION:

"For conspicuous gallantry and intrepidity at the risk of his life above and beyond the call of duty while serving as Supply Sergeant, Company A, First Battalion, Ninth Marines, Third Marine Division on 24 March 1967. Sergeant Singleton's company was conducting combat operations in Gio Linh District, Quang Tri Province, Republic of Vietnam, when the lead platoon received intense small arms, automatic weapons, rocket, and mortar fire from a well-entrenched enemy force. As the company fought its way forward, the extremely heavy enemy fire caused numerous friendly casualties. Sensing the need for early treatment of the wounded, Sergeant Singleton quickly moved from his relatively safe position in the rear of the foremost point of the advance and made numerous trips through the enemy killing zone to move the injured men out of the danger area. Noting that a large part of the enemy fire was coming from a hedgerow, he seized a machine gun and assaulted the key enemy location, delivering devastating fire as he advanced. He forced his way through the hedgerow directly into the enemy strong point. Although he was mortally wounded, his fearless attack killed eight of the enemy and drove the remainder from the hedgerow. Sergeant Singleton's bold actions completely disorganized the enemy defense and saved the lives of many of his comrades. His daring initiative, selfless devotion to duty and indomitable fighting spirit reflected great credit upon himself and the Marine Corps, and his performance upheld the highest traditions of the United States Naval Service."

/S/ LYNDON B. JOHNSON

== Namings and honors ==
The following are namings and honors for Sgt. Walter K. Singleton: Marine Corps

- Singleton Hall (October 13, 1976) – women Marine barracks (Building 2003) on the Marine Corps Base at Quantico, Virginia.
- Sgt. Walter K. Singleton Parkway (April 4, 1981) – runs from Memphis to the Naval Support Activity Mid-South (formerly Naval Air Station Memphis) in Millington, Tennessee. A historical marker has been erected at the southern terminus of Singleton Parkway at Austin Peay Highway.
- Singleton Avenue (January 1986) – at Marine Corps Air Station Yuma, in Yuma, Arizona
- Walter K. Singleton Gate (March 28, 1992) – south gate (# 8) at Naval Support Activity Mid-South (formerly Naval Air Station Memphis), in Millington, Tennessee.
- Sgt. Walter K. Singleton Marine Corps League Detachment 476 – Memphis, Tennessee Link

Community

- Sgt. Walter Singleton display (March 23, 1976) – Bartlett High School, Bartlett, Tennessee
- Singleton Community Center (1983), where a Tennessee Historical Commission Historical Marker also stands honoring Sgt Walter K. Singleton – Bartlett, Tennessee
- Sgt. Walter K. Singleton Park – on Castleman Street in Memphis, Tennessee

== See also ==
- List of Medal of Honor recipients
- List of Medal of Honor recipients for the Vietnam War
