= List of highways numbered 206 =

The following highways are numbered 206:

== Canada ==
- Manitoba Provincial Road 206
- Nova Scotia Route 206
- Prince Edward Island Route 206
- Quebec Route 206

== China ==
- China National Highway 206

== Costa Rica ==
- National Route 206

== India ==
- National Highway 206 (India)

== Japan ==
- Japan National Route 206

== United Kingdom ==
- A206 road
- B206 road

== United States ==
- U.S. Route 206
- Alabama State Route 206
- Arkansas Highway 206
- California State Route 206 (former)
- Florida State Road 206
- Georgia State Route 206
- Iowa Highway 206 (former)
- K-206 (Kansas highway)
- Kentucky Route 206
- Maine State Route 206
- M-206 (Michigan highway) (former)
- Montana Secondary Highway 206
- Nevada State Route 206
- New Mexico State Road 206
- New York State Route 206
- North Carolina Highway 206 (former)
- Ohio State Route 206
- Oregon Route 206
- Tennessee State Route 206
- Texas State Highway 206
  - Texas State Highway Spur 206
- Utah State Route 206 (former)
- Virginia State Route 206
- Washington State Route 206

Territories:

- Puerto Rico Highway 206
- U.S. Virgin Islands Highway 206

| Preceded by 205 | Lists of highways 206 | Succeeded by 207 |
