= Tennessee State Route 385 =

Highway in Tennessee

State Route 385
- Bill Morris Parkway; Paul W. Barret Parkway
- Current segments of SR 385 in red, former SR 385 (now I-269) in grey

Route information
- Maintained by TDOT

Southern segment
- Length: 15.44 mi (24.85 km)
- West end: I-240 in Memphis
- Major intersections: US 72 in Collierville
- East end: I-269 at the Collierville-Piperton line

Northern segment
- Length: 16.87 mi (27.15 km)
- South end: I-40 / I-269 in Arlington
- Major intersections: US 70 / US 79 in Arlington; SR 14 near Rosemark
- West end: US 51 in Millington

Location
- Country: United States
- State: Tennessee
- Counties: Shelby and Fayette

Highway system
- Tennessee State Routes; Interstate; US; State
← SR 384	→ SR 386

State Route 385 (SR 385) is the designation for two non-contiguous segments of east–west controlled-access highway in the Memphis metropolitan area in Shelby County, Tennessee, separated by a section of Interstate 269 (I-269). The northern section, designated as Paul W. Barret Parkway runs between U.S. Route 51 (US 51) in Millington and I-40 in Arlington, both of which are suburbs of Memphis. The southern segment, known as Bill Morris Parkway, runs between I-240 in southeastern Memphis, and I-269 in Collierville, and also serves the city of Germantown. The northern segment, combined with I-269, serves as a partial outer beltway around Memphis, and the southern segment serves as a spur route between the city and its southeastern suburbs, and is notable for its almost-exclusive use of single-point urban interchanges (SPUIs).

The highway that is now SR 385 was originally envisioned in the 1960s. The first section to be completed was part of the northern section in the early 1980s. The southern section was constructed in multiple sections between 1990 and 2000, with an extension opening in 2007. The highway was originally one continuous route until 2018, when the section between I-269 in Collierville and I-40 in Arlington, which opened in segments between 2007 and 2013, was redesignated as part of I-269.

== Route description ==
State Route 385 consists of two noncontiguous sections, designated as Bill Morris Parkway and Paul W. Barret Parkway, that are separated by a section of I-269. Both sections are located entirely within Shelby County.

=== Paul W. Barret Parkway ===
SR 385 begins at US 51 in an east–west orientation in the southern part of Millington in a partial-diamond interchange that is graded to allow for a possible westward extension. It immediately has its first interchange with Raleigh-Millington Road where it shifts to the southeast. A short distance later, the freeway reaches SR 204 a connector to the Naval Support Activity Mid-South base. The highway then shifts eastward again and enters the edge of a rural area north of Memphis. A short distance later is an interchange with SR 14 (Austin Peay Highway). Passing though mostly farmland with some residential areas, the freeway reaches Brunswick Road a few miles later, before interchanging with Stewart Road a short distance beyond. The freeway then shifts east−southeast before turning to the southeast. It then crosses the Loosahatchie River where it enters Arlington and has a near-full cloverleaf interchange with US 70/US 79. It then veers southward over the next 2.5 miles (4.0 km) before reaching I-40 at a cloverleaf interchange where the route continues to the south as I-269.

=== Bill Morris Parkway ===
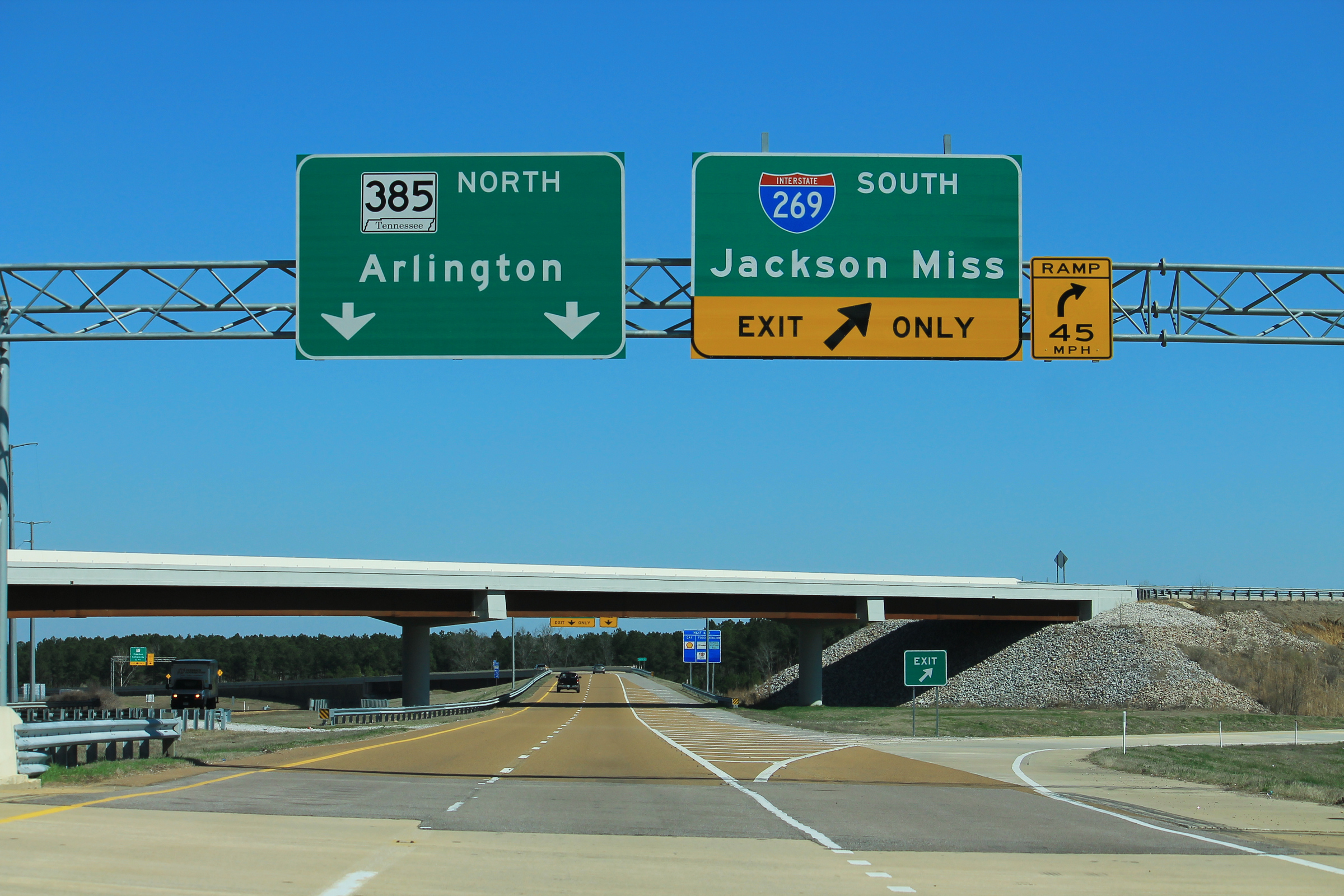
The eastern terminus of SR 385 at the interchange with I-269.

SR 385 begins at a directional-T interchange with I-240 in southeast Memphis along the north bank of Nonconnah Creek. This interchange provides direct unobstructed access between the route and the Mt. Moriah Road interchange on I-240. Proceeding in an east-southeast alignment as a six-lane freeway, the parkway quickly has its first interchange with Ridgeway Road, the only interchange with a surface street along this segment that is not a single point urban interchange (SPUI). It then crosses a floodplain and has an interchange with Kirby Parkway. Shifting slightly southeast, the freeway crosses Nonconnah Creek, and meets Riverdale Road. It then shifts into a direct east–west alignment and crosses Nonconnah Creek again, before shifting sharply southward, and interchanging with Winchester Road where it reduces to four lanes. The highway then crosses Nonconnah Creek for a third time before shifting southeastwardly again and reaching Hacks Cross Road. A short distance later, the route briefly curves eastward where it interchanges with Forest Hill Irene Road before entering Collierville. It then curves slightly southeast and then to the east–northeast and reaches an interchange with Houston Levee Road. A short distance later it shifts southeast at an interchange with Byhalia Road before turning northeastward at an interchange with US 72. The freeway then reaches its eastern terminus at a directional-T interchange with I-269 along the Shelby–Fayette County line, which is also the boundary between the cities of Collierville and Piperton.

== History ==
=== Background and construction ===
The first section of SR 385 built was the section of Paul W. Barret Parkway built between US 51 and SR 204 in Millington, which began construction in the spring of 1980 and was completed around September 1982. On September 25, 1998, the 12.7-mile (20.4 km) section of Paul Barret Parkway opened from SR 204 to US 70/79. The 1.6-mile (2.6 km) section between US 70/79 and I-40 was announced to have been opened on December 13, 1999, which occurred more than one year behind schedule.

The Bill Morris Parkway section of SR 385 was conceived in the 1960s to serve the suburbs in eastern Shelby County that began to grow as a result of suburbanization and white flight from the city of Memphis. It was intended to relieve congestion on surface arterial roads in the area extending into the central parts of Memphis, and was initially known as "Nonconnah Parkway" due to its proximity to Nonconnah Creek. In 1963, a comprehensive transportation study was undertaken of the Memphis area in collaboration with city, county, state, and federal officials. The results of this study were published in the Memphis Urban Area Transportation Study Plan in 1969, and identified the need for a major highway to serve the area, along with a longer partial-circumferential outer beltway around Memphis. In the fall of 1968, Tennessee Governor Buford Ellington asked the Federal Highway Administration (FHWA) to add the proposed highway to the Interstate Highway System as part of a proposed new Interstate between Birmingham, Alabama, and the Kansas City area. An update to the 1963 plan was completed in 1981, reaffirming the highway's need. TDOT approved the Advanced Planning Report for the project in 1983, and in August 1984 awarded a contract for route location studies, functional design, and environmental impact statement (EIS) preparation. The FHWA approved the location for the I-240 interchange on August 14, 1985, and initial public hearings were held in November of that year. Three possible alignments were proposed and studied during the planning phase. The first 5.5 miles (8.9 km) of the parkway were one of six major freeway projects, referred to at the time as "Bicentennial Parkways", that were spearheaded by passage of the Better Roads Program in 1986 by the Tennessee General Assembly. This section was expected to cost $40 million (equivalent to $99.5 million in 2025) at the time. The parkway also received federal funding from what was originally an allocation for a controversial section of I-40 in Memphis through Overton Park that was canceled in 1981. On January 29, 1988, the FHWA approved a final EIS for the section between I-240 and SR 57.

The first contract for construction of the Nonconnah Parkway was awarded on August 3, 1990, at a cost of $44.75 million (equivalent to $97.3 million in 2025), which was at the time the most expensive contract ever awarded by TDOT. The project included construction of the interchange between the parkway and I-240, construction of the first one mile (1.6 km) of the parkway between I-240 and Ridgeway Road, widening a total of 3.5 miles (5.6 km) of I-240 within the vicinity of the project from six to eight lanes, and construction of collector-distributor lanes and ramps along I-240 between Mt. Moriah Road and the interchange with SR 385. The segment between I-240 and Ridgeway Road opened on December 24, 1993, to eastbound traffic, and on January 15, 1994, to westbound traffic. The route was extended to Riverdale Road and opened on December 22, 1995. The portion from Riverdale Road to Houston Levee Road opened on December 29, 1997. The extension to SR 175 (Byhalia Road) opened in mid-October 1999. The segment between SR 175 and US 72 was completed on November 21, 2000. Work began on the extension to SR 57 in February 2003, and this section, part of which is now part of I-269, opened on August 23, 2007. This project included construction of provisions for the I-269 interchange that is now the eastern terminus of SR 385. The section of I-269 south of this interchange opened on October 23, 2015.

=== Winfield Dunn Parkway and I-269 ===
The segment of Interstate 269 between I-40 and what is now the eastern terminus of the Bill Morris Parkway part of SR 385 was originally signed as part of SR 385. The last section of this part opened on November 22, 2013. In 2018, portions of this segment were redesignated as I-269.

== Exit list ==
All exits are unnumbered.

County	Location	mi	km	Destinations	Notes
Shelby	Memphis	0.00	0.00	I-240 – Jackson, Miss., Nashville	I-240 exit 17
Shelby	Memphis	0.92	1.48	Ridgeway Road	
Shelby	Memphis	2.10	3.38	Kirby Parkway	
Shelby	Memphis	3.28	5.28	Riverdale Road	
Shelby	Memphis	4.51	7.26	Winchester Road	
Shelby		5.75	9.25	Hacks Cross Road	
Shelby		7.98	12.84	Forest Hill Irene Road	
Shelby	Collierville	10.11	16.27	Houston Levee Road	
Shelby	Collierville	12.14	19.54	SR 175 (Byhalia Road)	
Shelby	Collierville	14.15	22.77	US 72 (SR 86) – Collierville, Corinth, Miss.	
Shelby–Fayette county line	Collierville–Piperton line	15.44	24.85	I-269 – Arlington, Jackson, Miss.	I-269 exit 2; route continues north as I-269
Gap in route
Shelby	Arlington	32.08	51.63	I-40 / I-269 south – Memphis, Nashville, Jackson, Miss., Collierville	I-269 exit 19, I-40 exit 24; route continues south as I-269
Shelby	Arlington	34.50	55.52	US 70 / US 79 (SR 1) – Arlington, Lakeland	
Shelby	Lakeland	37.67	60.62	Stewart Road	
Shelby		39.57	63.68	Brunswick Road	
Shelby		42.98	69.17	SR 14 (Austin Peay Highway) – Memphis, Brownsville	
Shelby		46.03	74.08	SR 204 south (Singleton Parkway) – Naval Support Activity Mid-South	
Shelby	Millington	47.72	76.80	Raleigh–Millington Road	
Shelby	Millington	48.95	78.78	US 51 (SR 3) – Memphis, Millington	Northbound exit and southbound entrance; future continuation as I-269 North; northbound traffic must exit
Shelby	Millington			I-69 – Memphis	Future northern terminus of I-269
1.000 mi = 1.609 km; 1.000 km = 0.621 mi: Route transition; Unopened
