= Piperton, Tennessee =

- City
- Motto: "A better community built on small town values"
- Location of Piperton in Fayette County, Tennessee.
- Coordinates: 35°2′42″N 89°37′24″W
- Country: United States
- State: Tennessee
- County: Fayette
- Incorporated: 1974

Area
  - Total: 27.32 sq mi (70.77 km^{2})
  - Land: 27.19 sq mi (70.43 km^{2})
  - Water: 0.13 sq mi (0.33 km^{2})
- Elevation: 360 ft (110 m)

Population (2020)
  - Total: 2,263
  - Density: 83.2/sq mi (32.13/km^{2})
- Time zone: UTC-6 (Central (CST))
  - Summer (DST): UTC-5 (CDT)
- ZIP code: 38017 (Collierville)
- Area code: 901
- FIPS code: 47-58840
- GNIS feature ID: 1297695
- Website: www.pipertontn.com

Piperton is a city in Fayette County, Tennessee, United States. The population was 2,263 at the 2020 census. In 2007, USA Today cited the National Motorist Association when it listed Piperton as one of the worst cities for speeding tickets across the USA.

== Geography ==
Piperton is located in the southwest corner of Fayette County at 35°2′42″N 89°37′24″W (35.045003, -89.623451). It is bordered to the west by Collierville in Shelby County, to the east by Rossville, and to the south by Marshall County, Mississippi.

According to the United States Census Bureau, the city has a total area of 27.3 square miles (70.7 km^{2}), of which 27.2 square miles (70.4 km^{2}) is land and 0.1 square miles (0.3 km^{2}), or 0.45%, is water. The city's area nearly tripled between 2000 and 2010, from an area in 2000 of 9.8 square miles (25 km^{2}).

=== Major thoroughfares ===
- U.S. Route 72 crosses the southern part of the city, leading northwest into Collierville and 26 miles (42 km) to downtown Memphis. To the southeast, US 72 crosses into Mississippi and leads 64 miles (103 km) to Corinth.
- State Route 57 passes through central Piperton, leading west into Collierville and east 25 miles (40 km) to Grand Junction.
- State Route 196 crosses TN 57 at the center of Piperton and leads north 21 miles (34 km) to Gallaway. The southern terminus of TN 196 is at US 72 just north of the Mississippi border in southern Piperton.
- State Route 385 (Nonconnah/Bill Morris Parkway), the Memphis outer beltway, passes through the western part of Piperton, with access from TN 57.
- Interstate 269 has an interchange with TN 385 at the Piperton/Collierville border. To the north of the interchange, I-269 is the new numbering for the beltway, while to the south, I-269 leads into Mississippi, with one exit in Piperton at US 72.

== Demographics ==
Historical population
Census	Pop.	Note	%±
1980	746		—
1990	612		−18.0%
2000	589		−3.8%
2010	1,445		145.3%
2020	2,263		56.6%

=== 2020 census ===
As of the 2020 census, Piperton had a population of 2,263, with 652 families residing in the city. The median age was 54.0 years, 14.0% of residents were under the age of 18, and 24.0% of residents were 65 years of age or older. For every 100 females there were 98.2 males, and for every 100 females age 18 and over there were 97.1 males age 18 and over.

13.7% of residents lived in urban areas, while 86.3% lived in rural areas.

There were 895 households in Piperton, of which 23.1% had children under the age of 18 living in them. Of all households, 72.0% were married-couple households, 11.4% were households with a male householder and no spouse or partner present, and 14.0% were households with a female householder and no spouse or partner present. About 16.0% of all households were made up of individuals and 8.7% had someone living alone who was 65 years of age or older.

There were 934 housing units, of which 4.2% were vacant. The homeowner vacancy rate was 2.1% and the rental vacancy rate was 5.0%.

Racial composition as of the 2020 census
Race	Number	Percent
White	1,706	75.4%
Black or African American	401	17.7%
American Indian and Alaska Native	8	0.4%
Asian	41	1.8%
Native Hawaiian and Other Pacific Islander	2	0.1%
Some other race	16	0.7%
Two or more races	89	3.9%
Hispanic or Latino (of any race)	52	2.3%

=== 2000 census ===
At the 2000 census there were 589 people, 259 households, and 206 families in the city. The population density was 60.4 inhabitants per square mile (23.3/km^{2}). There were 269 housing units at an average density of 27.6 per square mile (10.7/km^{2}). The racial makeup of the city was 86.25% White, 12.56% African American, 0.51% Asian, 0.17% from other races, and 0.51% from two or more races. Hispanic or Latino of any race were 0.17%.

There were 259 households, of which 15.8% had children under the age of 18 living with them, 69.5% were married couples living together, 6.2% had a female householder with no husband present, and 20.1% were non-families. 18.1% of households were one person and 7.7% were one person aged 65 or older. The average household size was 2.27 and the average family size was 2.53.

The age distribution was 13.1% under the age of 18, 4.9% from 18 to 24, 18.8% from 25 to 44, 36.5% from 45 to 64, and 26.7% 65 or older. The median age was 53 years. For every 100 females, there were 92.5 males. For every 100 females age 18 and over, there were 91.8 males.

The median household income was $49,583 and the median family income was $62,500. Males had a median income of $43,929 versus $32,750 for females. The per capita income for the city was $28,435. About 1.1% of families and 2.6% of the population were below the poverty line, including 8.9% of those under age 18 and 2.7% of those age 65 or over.
