= Hickory Withe, Tennessee =

- Unincorporated community
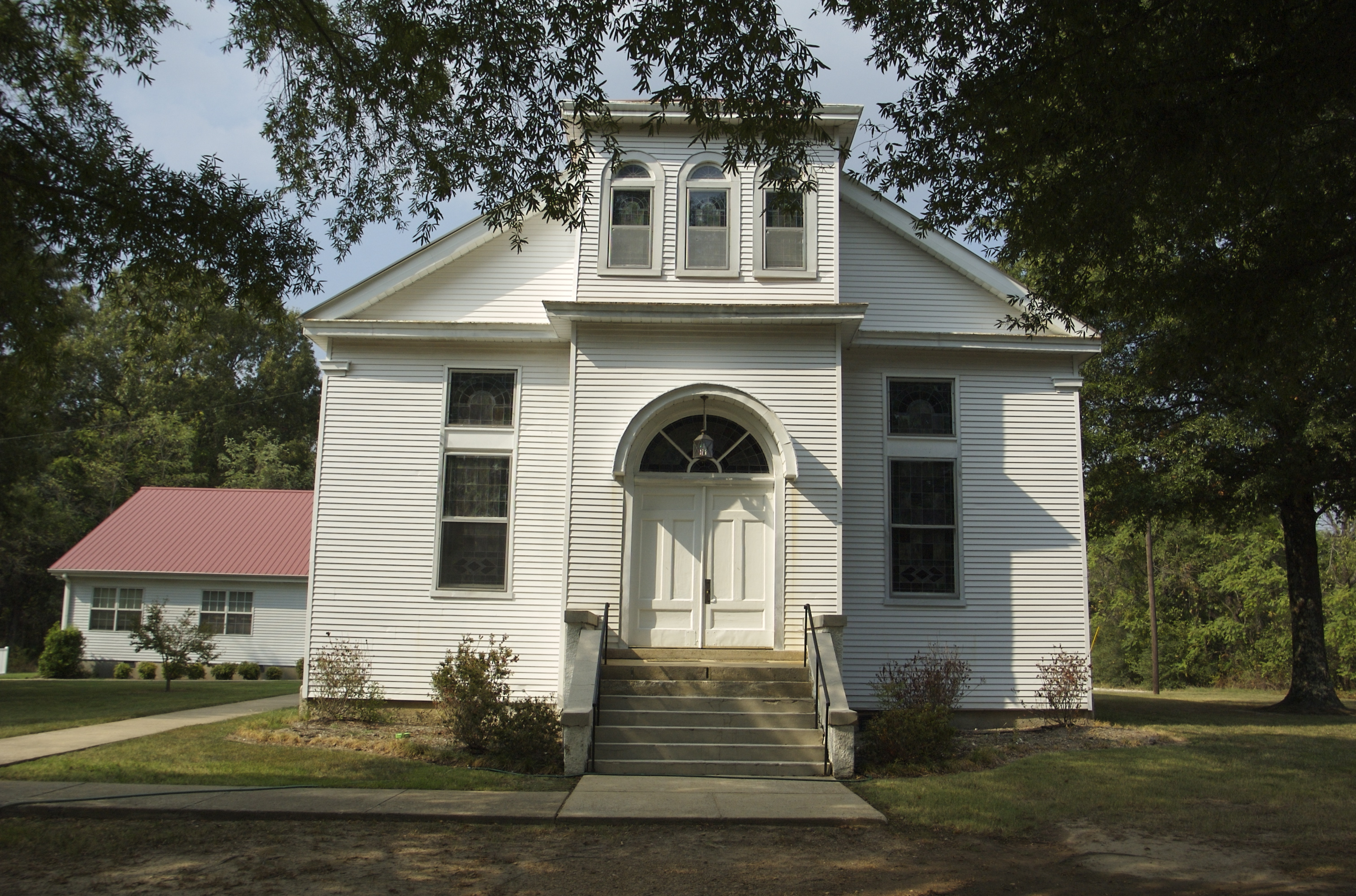
- Hickory Withe Presbyterian Church

- Location of Hickory Withe, Tennessee
- Coordinates: 35°14′38″N 89°35′19″W
- Country: United States
- State: Tennessee
- County: Fayette

Area
  - Total: 28.4 sq mi (73.6 km^{2})
  - Land: 28.3 sq mi (73.3 km^{2})
  - Water: 0.12 sq mi (0.3 km^{2})
- Elevation: 405 ft (123 m)

Population (2000)
  - Total: 2,574
  - Density: 91/sq mi (35.1/km^{2})
- Time zone: UTC-6 (Central (CST))
  - Summer (DST): UTC-5 (CDT)
- FIPS code: 47-33960
- Website: www.hickorywithe.com

Hickory Withe is an unincorporated community in Fayette County, Tennessee, United States, and is within the Memphis metropolitan area. For several years it functioned as an incorporated town, and was so treated at the 2000 census, at which time it had a population of 2,574.

== Geography ==
Hickory Withe is located in western Fayette County at 35°13′N 89°35′W (35.2236, -89.5819), within the postal code of the community of Eads, which is located in eastern Shelby County. It is bordered to the south and east by the town of Oakland. Tennessee State Route 196 passes through the community, leading north 6.5 miles (10.5 km) to Gallaway and south 1 mile (1.6 km) to U.S. Route 64 in the western part of Oakland. Via US 64, downtown Memphis is 31 miles (50 km) to the west.

According to the United States Census Bureau, the town had a total area of 28.4 square miles (74 km^{2}), of which 28.3 square miles (73 km^{2}) was land and 0.1 square miles (0.26 km^{2}), or 0.38%, was water.

== Demographics ==
As of the census of 2000, there were 2,574 people, 980 households, and 803 families residing in the town. The population density was 90.9 inhabitants per square mile (35.1/km^{2}). There were 1,016 housing units at an average density of 35.9 per square mile (13.9/km^{2}). The racial makeup of the town was 82.32% White, 16.24% African American, 0.08% Native American, 0.19% Asian, 0.04% Pacific Islander, 0.04% from other races, and 1.09% from two or more races. Hispanic or Latino of any race were 1.24% of the population.

There were 980 households, out of which 26.6% had children under the age of 18 living with them, 73.1% were married couples living together, 6.7% had a female householder with no husband present, and 18.0% were non-families. 14.9% of all households were made up of individuals, and 4.6% had someone living alone who was 65 years of age or older. The average household size was 2.63 and the average family size was 2.90.

In the town the population was spread out, with 20.5% under the age of 18, 6.8% from 18 to 24, 27.5% from 25 to 44, 33.8% from 45 to 64, and 11.5% who were 65 years of age or older. The median age was 43 years. For every 100 females, there were 101.4 males. For every 100 females age 18 and over, there were 95.9 males.

The median income for a household in the town was $57,292, and the median income for a family was $62,857. Males had a median income of $42,024 versus $28,550 for females. The per capita income for the town was $26,368. About 2.4% of families and 4.2% of the population were below the poverty line, including 3.0% of those under age 18 and 12.4% of those age 65 or over.

== History ==
The community of Hickory Withe was settled in 1834 by families who moved from the region around Prosperity, South Carolina.

One of the first acts of these settlers was to form the congregation of Prosperity Presbyterian Church, which was founded on the fourth Sunday of December 1834. This congregation united with another Presbyterian congregation, Mt. Pleasant Presbyterian Church, in 1907 to form Hickory Withe Presbyterian Church, which is still active today. That church, meeting in an historic property on Donelson Drive, is all that remains of what once was "Main Street" of Hickory Withe: Donelson Drive used to be home to a post office, a general store, a cotton gin, and a two-room school house, in addition to the church. The school facility was deeded to the Hickory Withe Presbyterian Church in 1974, and is maintained today; the remaining businesses and buildings have been removed, leaving only residences and the church.

Efforts to incorporate Hickory Withe led to revisions of Tennessee laws regarding incorporation and annexation. In the mid-1990s supporters of the idea of incorporating Hickory Withe went to Lieutenant Governor John S. Wilder, who was from nearby Braden and had represented the area in the Tennessee Senate since 1966, with the idea of sponsoring a bill which would allow Hickory Withe to incorporate, something which could not be accomplished under the then-existing law. Wilder learned that he could not introduce an act allowing only for the incorporation of Hickory Withe as this would be rejected by the courts as unconstitutional, so it was necessary for any act to help Hickory Withe to incorporate to be worded in a broad enough fashion to allow any similar area in Tennessee which also desired to incorporate to do so as well. The eventual bill which passed was drawn in such a way as to allow almost any previously unincorporated area to incorporate, and several attempted to do so, including, famously, an apartment building near Elizabethton. The resulting legislation became known, somewhat derisively, as the "Tiny Towns Bill". Most of the towns which were set up, or were attempted to be set up under the act, seemed primarily to be efforts to prevent areas from being annexed by larger jurisdictions which charged property tax. The Tennessee Supreme Court struck down the new legislation on November 19, 1997, less than a year after it entered the books. Corrective legislation enacted since has required any new town being set up to have a property tax rate set as a condition of its incorporation (and that rate cannot be "zero"). Towns set up under the "Tiny Town" law, like Hickory Withe, were not automatically dissolved with the act's repeal, although some have subsequently taken this step.

== Community character ==
Hickory Withe is predominantly semi-rural and agricultural. The primary agricultural product cultivated in and around the community is cotton. Horse farming is also a significant agricultural land use.

The community has seen more recent residential development as a result of the eastward expansion of the Memphis urban area and the completion of the Memphis outer beltway (now I-269) in nearby eastern Shelby County.
