= Tipton-Rosemark Academy =

Location
- Rosemark, Tennessee; United States; 35.3638°N 89.7708°W

Information
- Type: Private Christian School
- Motto: Bound for College, Prepared for Life.
- Established: 1965
- Grades: K-12
- Colors: Red, White, and Blue
- Mascot: Rebel
- Newspaper: TRA Tribune
- Website: tiptonrosemarkacademy.net

Tipton-Rosemark Academy (often abbreviated TRA) is a private Christian school in Shelby County, Tennessee, United States. It is in the community of Rosemark, and near the border of Shelby and Tipton County. It was established as a Christian academy and uses confederate imagery, including the nickname Rebels.

== History ==
Tipton-Rosemark Academy's inception came in 1965, when a group of parents established a Christian academy using the name Tipton Academy. The founders since have framed the impetus for the school to be concern about the legal decision Abington School District v. Schempp, which prevented required government-sponsored Bible reading in public schools. An elementary school was established in a house in Munford, Tennessee, and named Tipton Academy.

In 1967, another group built a facility in Brighton, Tennessee. In 1970, a kindergarten was added. Tipton Academy purchased Rosemark School, a closed public school built in 1922 from Shelby County in hopes of expanding the academy into grades 9–12. The newly acquired school was named Rosemark Academy. Some historians have cited Rosemark Academy as an example of a segregation academy.

Seventh and eighth grades were moved to the Rosemark Academy in 1986 as the first step to consolidate all grades to the Rosemark campus.

As part of the consolidation process, a new elementary school building was constructed in 1988. The decision was then made to combine the names of the two schools, thus creating the modern name of Tipton-Rosemark Academy.

In May 2008, RTA abandoned the old Rosemark school building, which had been built in 1922. In response to the Tennessee Preservation Trust's desire to save the building, the school offered to preserve it if $200,000 in donations could be raised by August, otherwise it would be razed before the new school year started. According to the school website, due to fire codes, the old Rosemark high school building came down in the summer of 2008. The cornerstones were saved and became part of the new TRA Performing Arts Center and Chapel.

The Head of School at Tipton-Rosemark Academy is Dr. Andy Graham, Jr.. He was appointed to the position in July 2021.

== Athletics ==
TRA is a member of the TSSAA, classified as Division II, Class A West. The school's mascot is the Rebel, and all sports teams are known as the TRA Rebels. Football, basketball, volleyball, soccer, softball, baseball, tennis, golf, cross country, and cheerleading are offered as varsity athletics.

The school has won the following TSSAA championships:

- Girls softball (2011, 2014, 2026)
