= Tennessee State Route 222 =

State highway

State Route 222
- SR 222 highlighted in red

Route information
- Maintained by TDOT
- Length: 12.9 mi (20.8 km)
- Existed: July 1, 1983–present

Major junctions
- South end: SR 59 near Somerville
- I-40 near Stanton
- North end: US 70 / US 79 in Stanton

Location
- Country: United States
- State: Tennessee
- Counties: Fayette, Haywood

Highway system
- Tennessee State Routes; Interstate; US; State
| ← SR 221 | → SR 223 |

State Route 222 (SR 222) is a 12.9 miles (20.8 km) long north–south state highway in southern West Tennessee. It connects the towns of Somerville and Stanton with Interstate 40 (I-40; Exit 42).

== Route description ==
SR 222 begins in Fayette County north of Somerville at a Y-Intersection with SR 59. It heads northwest as a two-lane highway through farmland for several miles to an interchange with I-40 (Exit 42). The highway then crosses into Haywood County and temporarily widens to four-lane highway, bypassing the original two-lane alignment to the west, which is now known as Stanton Somerville Road. SR 222 then narrows to two-lanes and enters Stanton as Lafayette Street, where it passes through some neighborhoods before coming to an end at an intersection with US 70/US 79/SR 1 just west of downtown.

== Major intersections ==
| County | Location | mi | km | Destinations | Notes |
|---|---|---|---|---|---|
| Fayette | | 0.0 | 0.0 | SR 59 – Somerville, Braden | Southern terminus |
| Fayette | | 7.7– 7.9 | 12.4– 12.7 | I-40 – Memphis, Nashville | I-40 exit 42 |
| Haywood | Blue Oval City | | | SR 468 west (Blue Oval City Connector) | Future eastern terminus of SR 468 |
| Haywood | Stanton | 12.9 | 20.8 | US 70 / US 79 (SR 1) | Northern terminus; road continues as Holland Street |
1.000 mi = 1.609 km; 1.000 km = 0.621 mi: Unopened
