= List of highways numbered 204 =

The following highways are numbered 204:

== Canada ==
- Manitoba Provincial Road 204
- Newfoundland and Labrador Route 204
- Nova Scotia Route 204
- Prince Edward Island Route 204
- Quebec Route 204

== China ==
- China National Highway 204

== Costa Rica ==
- National Route 204

== Israel ==
- Route 204

== Japan ==
- Japan National Route 204

== United Kingdom ==
- A204 road
- B204 road

== United States ==
- Alabama State Route 204
- Arkansas Highway 204 (former)
- California State Route 204
- Florida State Road 204 (former)
- Georgia State Route 204
- Iowa Highway 204 (former)
- K-204 (Kansas highway)
- Maine State Route 204
- Massachusetts Route 204 (former)
- M-204 (Michigan highway)
- Montana Secondary Highway 204
- New Mexico State Road 204
- New York State Route 204
- Ohio State Route 204
- Oregon Route 204
- Pennsylvania Route 204
- South Dakota Highway 204
- Tennessee State Route 204
- Texas State Highway 204
  - Texas State Highway Loop 204
- Utah State Route 204
- Virginia State Route 204
- Washington State Route 204

Territories

- Puerto Rico Highway 204

Preceded by 203	Lists of highways 204	Succeeded by 205
