= Hickory Withe Presbyterian Church =

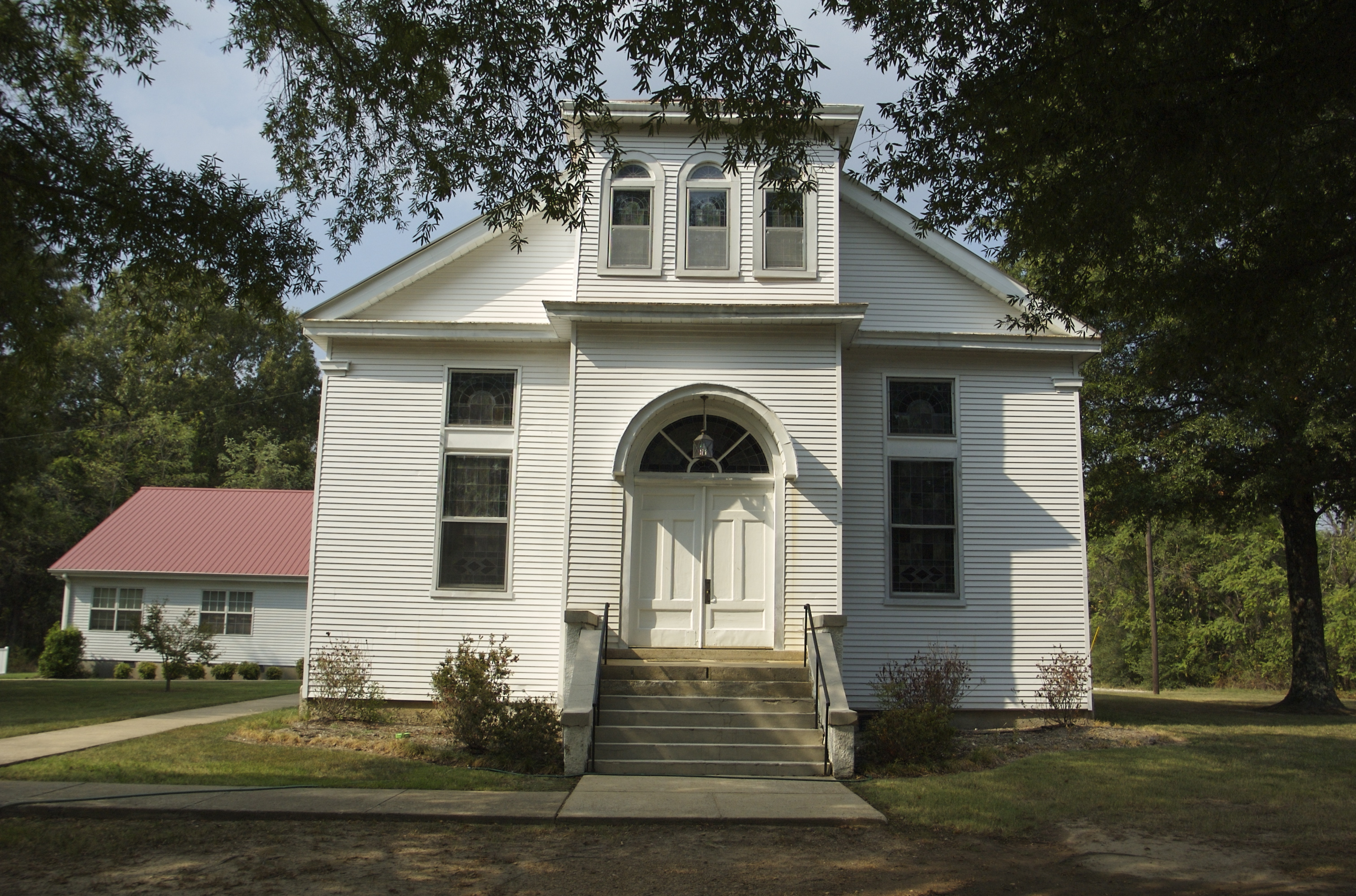
- Hickory Withe Presbyterian Church
- Hickory Withe Presbyterian Church
- 35.143692°N 89.353068°W
- Location: Hickory Withe, Tennessee, United States
- Denomination: Presbyterian Church in America
- Website: http://www.hickorywithepc.org

History
- Former name(s): Prosperity Presbyterian Church; Mt. Pleasant Presbyterian Church
- Founded: 1834

Architecture
- Style: Carpenter Gothic

Administration
- Diocese: Covenant Presbytery PCA

Hickory Withe Presbyterian Church is a member congregation of the Presbyterian Church in America, at 2420 Donelson Drive, Hickory Withe, Tennessee. Two churches, Prosperity Presbyterian Church and Mount Pleasant Presbyterian Church, merged in 1907 to form Hickory Withe Presbyterian Church.
