= Navy Ten Nautical Miler =

- Date: Sunday, June 7, 2015
- Location: Naval Support Activity Mid-South, Millington, Tennessee, United States and Farah, Afghanistan
- Event type: Road
- Distance: 10 nmi (19 km)
- Established: 2010
- Website: www.thenavy10nm.com

The Navy Ten Nautical Miler (Navy 10 nm, 11.5 mi) is a 10-nautical-mile (19 km) run held at Naval Support Activity Mid-South in Millington, Tennessee. It is unique because it is the only race measured in nautical miles as opposed to statute miles.

The Navy Ten Nautical Miler is an event officially sanctioned by USA Track & Field, the national governing body for track and field, long-distance running, and race walking in the United States. The event is coordinated in association with the Memphis Runners Track Club.

== Inspiration ==
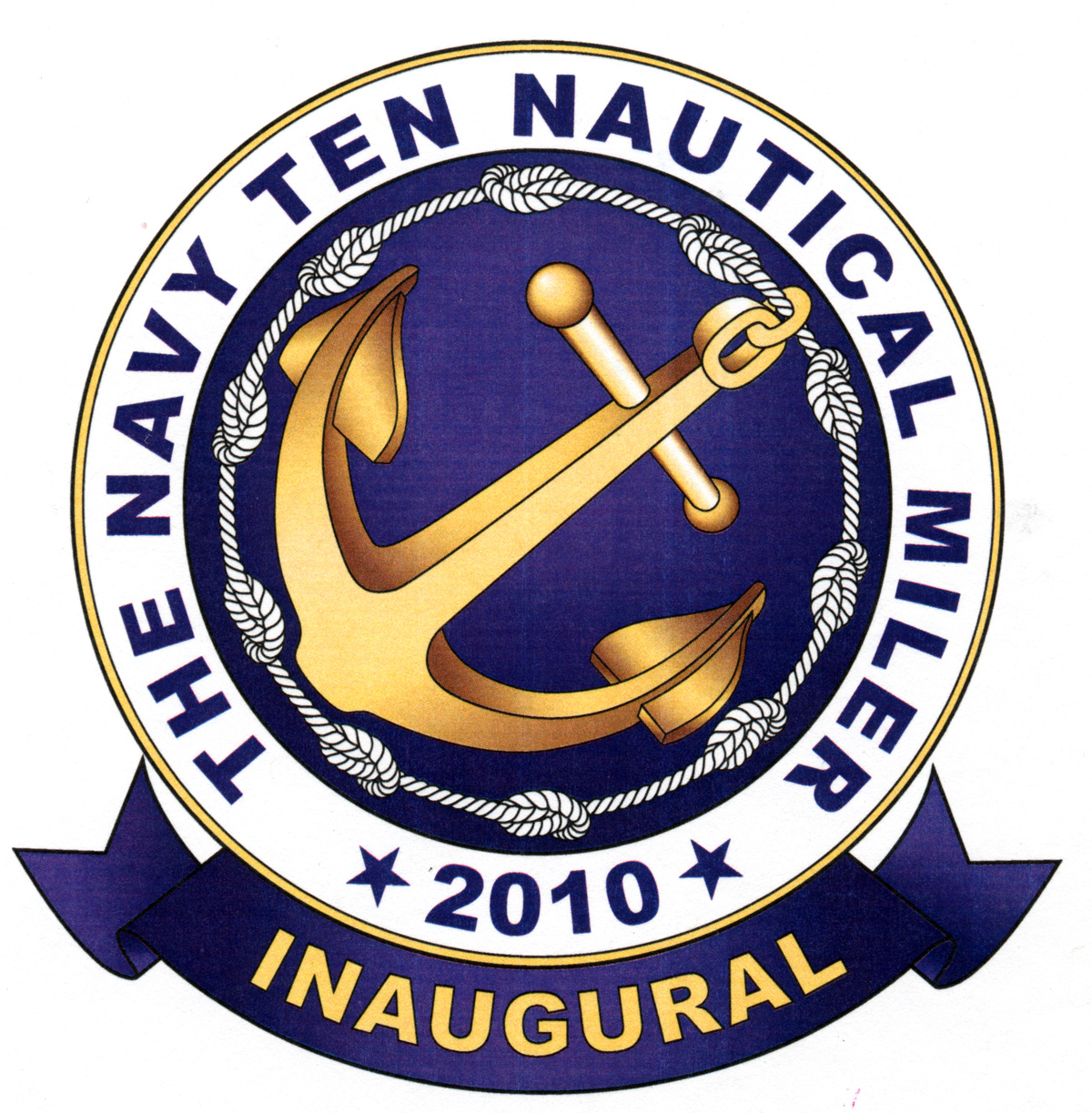
The inaugural run of the Navy Ten Nautical Miler road race took place June 6, 2010, at the Naval Support Activity Mid-South.

The Navy Ten Nautical Miler was founded in 2010 to give the United States Navy a premiere foot race to replace the disestablished Blue Angels Marathon. The length of ten nautical miles was chosen as the length because it is roughly the distance from the shore to the horizon when viewed at sea level. It was also the distance traveled by the Allied Forces on D-Day, significant because the inaugural run of the Navy Ten Nautical Miler took place on June 6, 2010, the anniversary of D-Day.

A nautical mile is approximately the distance of one minute of arc of latitude on the Earth's surface. Sailors throughout history have used this form of measurement as opposed to statute miles or kilometers.

== Route ==
The race begins at the North 82 Gym, onboard NSA Mid-South, and runs north through the Glen Eagle Golf Course, the Lazy Anchor Stables, and the Navy Lake recreational facility before turning south down Bethuel Road, then west across Navy Road. The route then turns into the south side of the base, and follows the perimeter road around the base housing area, then turns south up Singleton Parkway before exiting back out to Navy Road. The run ends back at the North 82 Gym.

In keeping with the theme, mile markers throughout the route are also marked off in nautical miles rather than statute miles.

== Awards ==
Awards will be presented three deep in the following categories:

- Overall - Male & Female
- Masters 40+
- Grand Masters 50+
- Senior Masters 60+
- Wheelchair
- Each Age Group - 12–13; 14–15; 16–19; 20–24; 25–29; 30–34; 35–39; 40–44; 45–49; 50–54; 55–59; 60–64; 65–69; and 70-over.

== Afghanistan ==
In April 2010, race coordinators were contacted by Navy personnel serving in Farah, Afghanistan interested in running a satellite version of the race there. As such, the race was run concurrently in both locations, with winners in each category crowned locally in both locations. The two locations were connected via satellite uplink.
