= Utah State Route 205 =

Utah State Route 205 may refer to:

- Utah State Route 205 (1939-1953)
- Utah State Route 205 (1963-1964)
- Utah State Route 205 (1965-1969)
