= Gallaway, Tennessee =

Gallaway
- City
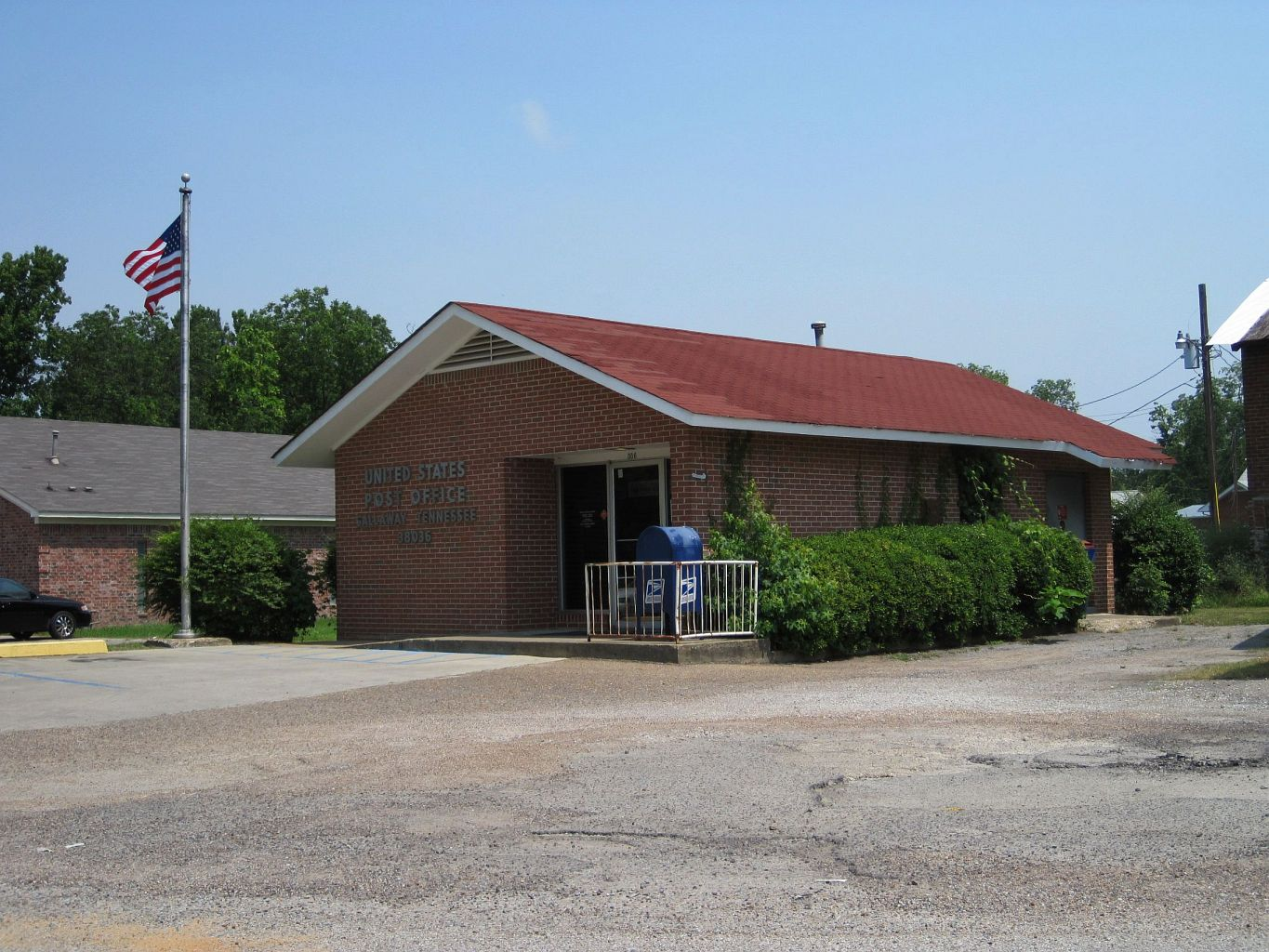
- The Gallaway post office

- Location of Gallaway in Fayette County, Tennessee.
- Coordinates: 35°19′36″N 89°36′59″W
- Country: United States
- State: Tennessee
- County: Fayette

Area
  - Total: 5.30 sq mi (13.72 km^{2})
  - Land: 5.30 sq mi (13.72 km^{2})
  - Water: 0 sq mi (0.00 km^{2})
- Elevation: 282 ft (86 m)

Population (2020)
  - Total: 528
  - Density: 99.7/sq mi (38.49/km^{2})
- Time zone: UTC-6 (Central (CST))
  - Summer (DST): UTC-5 (CDT)
- ZIP code: 38036
- Area code: 901
- FIPS code: 47-28560
- GNIS feature ID: 1285101
- Website: www.gallawaytn.gov

Gallaway is a city in Fayette County, Tennessee, United States. As of the 2020 census, Gallaway had a population of 528.

== Geography ==
Gallaway is located in northwestern Fayette County at 35°19′36″N 89°36′59″W (35.326725, -89.616484). U.S. Routes 70 and 79 pass through the northwest side of the city as a single two-lane highway, leading northeast 5 miles (8 km) to Braden and southwest 4 miles (6 km) to Arlington. Downtown Memphis is 30 miles (48 km) to the southwest. Tennessee State Route 196 leads south 6.5 miles (10.5 km) to Hickory Withe.

According to the United States Census Bureau, the city of Gallaway has a total area of 6.1 square miles (15.9 km^{2}), all land. The Loosahatchie River, a tributary of the Mississippi, flows from east to west through the southern part of the city limits.

== Demographics ==
=== Racial and ethnic composition ===
Gallaway, Tennessee – Racial and ethnic composition Note: the US Census treats Hispanic/Latino as an ethnic category. This table excludes Latinos from the racial categories and assigns them to a separate category. Hispanics/Latinos may be of any race.
Race / Ethnicity (NH = Non-Hispanic)	Pop 2000	Pop 2010	Pop 2020	% 2000	% 2010	% 2020
White alone (NH)	266	329	183	39.94%	48.38%	34.66%
Black or African American alone (NH)	393	336	307	59.01%	49.41%	58.14%
Native American or Alaska Native alone (NH)	1	1	3	0.15%	0.15%	0.57%
Asian alone (NH)	0	0	1	0.00%	0.00%	0.19%
Pacific Islander alone (NH)	0	1	0	0.00%	0.15%	0.00%
Some Other Race alone (NH)	0	1	6	0.00%	0.15%	1.14%
Mixed Race or Multi-Racial (NH)	6	9	7	0.90%	1.32%	1.33%
Hispanic or Latino (any race)	0	3	21	0.00%	0.44%	3.98%
Total	666	680	528	100.00%	100.00%	100.00%

=== 2020 census ===
As of the 2020 census, Gallaway had a population of 528. The median age was 51.7 years. 21.6% of residents were under the age of 18 and 27.1% of residents were 65 years of age or older. For every 100 females there were 92.0 males, and for every 100 females age 18 and over there were 82.4 males age 18 and over.

72.5% of residents lived in urban areas, while 27.5% lived in rural areas.

There were 212 households in Gallaway, of which 23.6% had children under the age of 18 living in them. Of all households, 18.4% were married-couple households, 38.7% were households with a male householder and no spouse or partner present, and 39.2% were households with a female householder and no spouse or partner present. About 51.8% of all households were made up of individuals and 19.3% had someone living alone who was 65 years of age or older.

There were 230 housing units, of which 7.8% were vacant. The homeowner vacancy rate was 0.0% and the rental vacancy rate was 5.2%.

Racial composition as of the 2020 census
Race	Number	Percent
White	186	35.2%
Black or African American	314	59.5%
American Indian and Alaska Native	3	0.6%
Asian	1	0.2%
Native Hawaiian and Other Pacific Islander	0	0.0%
Some other race	10	1.9%
Two or more races	14	2.7%
Hispanic or Latino (of any race)	21	4.0%

=== 2000 census ===
As of the census of 2000, there was a population of 666, with 235 households and 145 families residing in the city. The population density was 188.1 inhabitants per square mile (72.6/km^{2}). There were 267 housing units at an average density of 75.4 per square mile (29.1/km^{2}). The racial makeup of the city was 39.94% White, 59.01% African American, 0.15% Native American, and 0.90% from two or more races.

There were 235 households, out of which 31.5% had children under the age of 18 living with them, 29.8% were married couples living together, 28.9% had a female householder with no husband present, and 37.9% were non-families. 36.2% of all households were made up of individuals, and 11.9% had someone living alone who was 65 years of age or older. The average household size was 2.49 and the average family size was 3.26.

In the city, the population was spread out, with 28.1% under the age of 18, 9.0% from 18 to 24, 21.5% from 25 to 44, 21.9% from 45 to 64, and 19.5% who were 65 years of age or older. The median age was 38 years. For every 100 females, there were 86.0 males. For every 100 females age 18 and over, there were 76.1 males.

The median income for a household in the city was $15,192, and the median income for a family was $23,750. Males had a median income of $25,179 versus $16,500 for females. The per capita income for the city was $12,836. About 35.5% of families and 43.5% of the population were below the poverty line, including 53.6% of those under age 18 and 15.2% of those age 65 or over.

== Commerce ==
The town's largest employer is Medical Action Industries, a producer of plastic medical supplies and patient bedside items.
