= Gilt Edge, Tennessee =

- City
- Location of Gilt Edge in Tipton County, Tennessee.
- Coordinates: 35°32′1″N 89°49′50″W
- Country: United States
- State: Tennessee
- County: Tipton

Area
  - Total: 2.75 sq mi (7.12 km^{2})
  - Land: 2.71 sq mi (7.01 km^{2})
  - Water: 0.039 sq mi (0.10 km^{2})
- Elevation: 272 ft (83 m)

Population (2020)
  - Total: 476
  - Density: 175.8/sq mi (67.87/km^{2})
- Time zone: UTC-6 (Central (CST))
  - Summer (DST): UTC-5 (CDT)
- ZIP code: 38015
- Area code: 901
- FIPS code: 47-29160
- GNIS feature ID: 1285436

Gilt Edge is a city in Tipton County, Tennessee. As of the 2020 census, Gilt Edge had a population of 476.

== Geography ==
Gilt Edge is located at 35°32′1″N 89°49′50″W (35.533724, -89.830447). It lies at the intersection of State Route 59 and State Route 178, approximately 10 miles southwest of downtown Covington, directly adjacent to Burlison to the east, approximately 7 miles north of Munford, and approximately 4 miles east of the Mississippi River.

According to the United States Census Bureau, the city has a total area of 3.0 square miles (7.8 km^{2}), of which 2.9 square miles (7.5 km^{2}) is land and 0.04-square-mile (0.10 km^{2}) (1.36%) is water.

== Demographics ==
Historical population
Census	Pop.	Note	%±
1970	406		—
1980	409		0.7%
1990	447		9.3%
2000	489		9.4%
2010	477		−2.5%
2020	476		−0.2%

=== 2020 census ===
As of the 2020 census, Gilt Edge had a population of 476. The median age was 40.7 years. 23.3% of residents were under the age of 18 and 14.7% of residents were 65 years of age or older. For every 100 females there were 95.1 males, and for every 100 females age 18 and over there were 96.2 males age 18 and over.

0.0% of residents lived in urban areas, while 100.0% lived in rural areas.

There were 193 households in Gilt Edge, of which 39.4% had children under the age of 18 living in them. Of all households, 49.7% were married-couple households, 19.2% were households with a male householder and no spouse or partner present, and 23.8% were households with a female householder and no spouse or partner present. About 23.8% of all households were made up of individuals and 13.0% had someone living alone who was 65 years of age or older.

There were 202 housing units, of which 4.5% were vacant. The homeowner vacancy rate was 1.3% and the rental vacancy rate was 0.0%.

Racial composition as of the 2020 census
Race	Number	Percent
White	442	92.9%
Black or African American	0	0.0%
American Indian and Alaska Native	0	0.0%
Asian	0	0.0%
Native Hawaiian and Other Pacific Islander	0	0.0%
Some other race	2	0.4%
Two or more races	32	6.7%
Hispanic or Latino (of any race)	10	2.1%

=== 2000 census ===
As of the 2000 census, there was a population of 489, with 190 households and 145 families residing in the city. The population density was 167.8 inhabitants per square mile (64.8/km^{2}). There were 198 housing units at an average density of 67.9 per square mile (26.2/km^{2}). The racial makeup of the city was 98.77% White, 0.41% African American, 0.20% Native American, 0.20% Pacific Islander, and 0.41% from two or more races. Hispanic or Latino of any race were 0.61% of the population.

There were 190 households, out of which 35.8% had children under the age of 18 living with them, 67.4% were married couples living together, 8.4% had a female householder with no husband present, and 23.2% were non-families. 19.5% of all households were made up of individuals, and 10.0% had someone living alone who was 65 years of age or older. The average household size was 2.57 and the average family size was 2.98.

In the city, the population was spread out, with 24.1% under the age of 18, 8.8% from 18 to 24, 30.5% from 25 to 44, 25.6% from 45 to 64, and 11.0% who were 65 years of age or older. The median age was 38 years. For every 100 females, there were 91.8 males. For every 100 females age 18 and over, there were 90.3 males.

The median income for a household in the city was $46,250, and the median income for a family was $55,625. Males had a median income of $31,875 versus $24,375 for females. The per capita income for the city was $21,491. About 5.8% of families and 9.7% of the population were below the poverty line, including 15.5% of those under age 18 and 11.6% of those age 65 or over.

== Emergency Services ==
Fire, rescue, and medical services in and around Gilt Edge are under the jurisdiction of the Gilt Edge Volunteer Fire Department, established in 1986. Mutual aid is provided by the Garland Volunteer Fire Department and Station 41 of the Tipton County Fire Department. Their Fire District covers an area of 41 square miles and includes the town limits of Burlison, Tennessee, which does not have its own fire service. GEVFD operates the county's only Heavy Rescue and holds an ISO Class 4 designation.

Law Enforcement services are conducted by the Tennessee Highway Patrol, the Tipton County Sheriff's Office, and the local District Constable.
