= Burlison, Tennessee =

- Town
- Location of Burlison in Tipton County, Tennessee.
- Coordinates: 35°33′26″N 89°47′13″W
- Country: United States
- State: Tennessee
- County: Tipton

Area
  - Total: 1.05 sq mi (2.72 km^{2})
  - Land: 1.05 sq mi (2.72 km^{2})
  - Water: 0 sq mi (0.00 km^{2})
- Elevation: 410 ft (125 m)

Population (2020)
  - Total: 367
  - Density: 349.4/sq mi (134.92/km^{2})
- Time zone: UTC-6 (Central (CST))
  - Summer (DST): UTC-5 (CDT)
- ZIP code: 38015
- Area code: 901
- FIPS code: 47-09860
- GNIS feature ID: 1279062

Burlison is a town in Tipton County, Tennessee. As of the 2020 census, Burlison had a population of 367.

== Geography ==
Burlison is located at 35°33′26″N 89°47′13″W (35.557142, -89.787010). The town lies along State Route 59 between Gilt Edge and Covington.

According to the United States Census Bureau, the town has a total area of 1.0 square mile (2.6 km^{2}), all land.

== Demographics ==
Historical population
Census	Pop.	Note	%±
1970	397		—
1980	386		−2.8%
1990	394		2.1%
2000	453		15.0%
2010	425		−6.2%
2020	367		−13.6%

As of the census of 2000, there were 453 people, 180 households, and 133 families residing in the town. The population density was 432.2 inhabitants per square mile (166.9/km^{2}). There were 190 housing units at an average density of 181.3 per square mile (70.0/km^{2}). The racial makeup of the town was 99.12% White, 0.44% African American, 0.22% Native American, and 0.22% from two or more races.

There were 180 households, out of which 34.4% had children under the age of 18 living with them, 66.1% were married couples living together, 5.6% had a female householder with no husband present, and 25.6% were non-families. 20.6% of all households were made up of individuals, and 11.1% had someone living alone who was 65 years of age or older. The average household size was 2.52 and the average family size was 2.90.

In the town, the population was spread out, with 24.1% under the age of 18, 11.3% from 18 to 24, 27.6% from 25 to 44, 23.2% from 45 to 64, and 13.9% who were 65 years of age or older. The median age was 38 years. For every 100 females, there were 123.2 males. For every 100 females age 18 and over, there were 106.0 males.

The median income for a household in the town was $38,056, and the median income for a family was $42,813. Males had a median income of $35,250 versus $23,929 for females. The per capita income for the town was $17,685. About 4.3% of families and 7.0% of the population were below the poverty line, including 5.5% of those under age 18 and 16.0% of those age 65 or over.

== Community ==
Burlison has a post office, cotton gin, and a community center. The Burlison Community Center can be used by anyone for a rental fee of $125.00. Burlison also has a park, located behind the community center. It is equipped with a basketball court, a playground, and picnic tables. There are no stop lights, only flashing lights and a few stop signs. The mayor is Jim Kenny. Town Council meetings are held on the second Tuesday of each month at the Burlison Community Center and are open to the public.

== See also ==
- List of municipalities in Tennessee
