= Rosemark, Tennessee =

- Unincorporated community
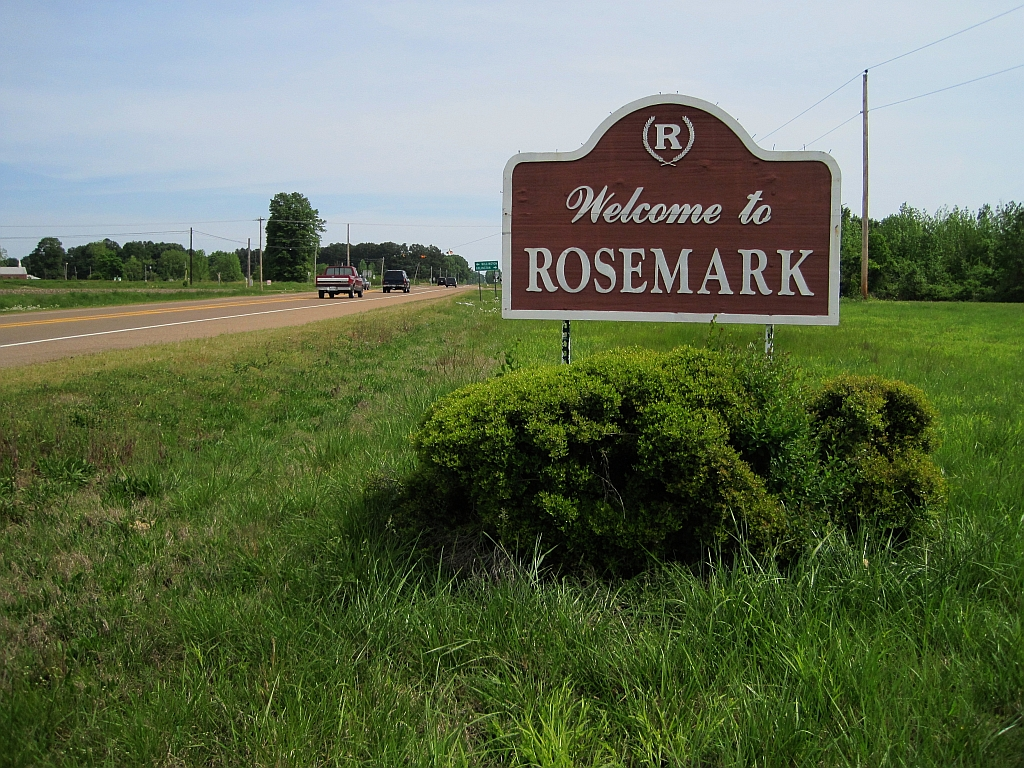
- Welcome sign in Rosemark

- Location within Tennessee Location within the United States
- Coordinates: 35°21′45″N 89°46′20″W
- Country: United States
- State: Tennessee
- County: Shelby
- Elevation: 331 ft (101 m)
- Time zone: UTC-6 (Central (CST))
  - Summer (DST): UTC-5 (CDT)
- Area code: 901
- GNIS feature ID: 1300098

Rosemark is an unincorporated residential and farm community located along Tennessee State Route 14 in northeastern Shelby County, Tennessee, United States. It had a population of 2,315 people in 2010.

An area of approximately 115 acres (47 ha) in Rosemark was listed on the National Register of Historic Places in 2013 as the Rosemark Historic District.

== History ==
Originally known as Richland, a name that probably referred to the fertility of the soil, the Rosemark area was settled as early as the 1830s. The main economic activity in the area was cotton farming. Years later, the community name was changed from Richland to Rosemark after residents learned that another Tennessee community was named Richland, but the Richland name is still used by several community institutions in Rosemark.

For most of its history, Rosemark was an agricultural crossroads community, with a cotton gin and community facilities. The community's first school, Richland School, opened in 1861. Much growth, including the formation of churches and the establishment of stores and the cotton gin, occurred during the decades following the Civil War. A Masonic lodge was formed in 1892. In 1912, a cooperative telephone company was formed and a bank was chartered. Other active businesses in Rosemark in the early decades of the 20th century included a blacksmith shop and a beauty parlor. A doctor set up a medical office in the community in 1896 and maintained his practice there until 1946.

As of the early 21st century, Rosemark is part of suburban Memphis, but retains the characteristics of an intact rural community.

Some historical information on the area is included in the book Illustrated History of the People and Towns of Northeast Shelby County and South Central Tipton County - Salem, Portersville, Idaville, Kerrville, Armourtown, Bethel, Tipton, Mudville, Macedonia, Gratitude, Barretville, and Rosemark, Tennessee published by the Historic Archives of Rosemark and Environs, Inc. The book contains transcriptions and summaries of oral history interviews, family archival material, and historic maps.

The National Register historic district includes 72 contributing properties. Among these are the cotton gin and lint house, schools, a bank, a Masonic lodge building, two churches, stores, and 24 residences. The oldest building in the district dates from about 1890; most of the other contributing buildings were completed before 1920. The bungalow is the most common architectural style.

== Geography ==
Rosemark is centered at Rosemark Road and Kerrville-Rosemark Road, the location of several old community institutions including the Rosemark ARP Church, the Rosemark Pentecostal Church, and Tipton-Rosemark Academy (formerly Rosemark School). State Route 14 (Austin Peay Highway) and State Route 205 (Millington-Arlington Road) also pass through the community.

== Notable people ==
- Bobby Bland, blues artist, was born in Barretville (a community adjacent to Rosemark), and grew up in both areas.
