= Naval Support Activity Mid-South =

US Naval base

- Millington, Tennessee in the United States
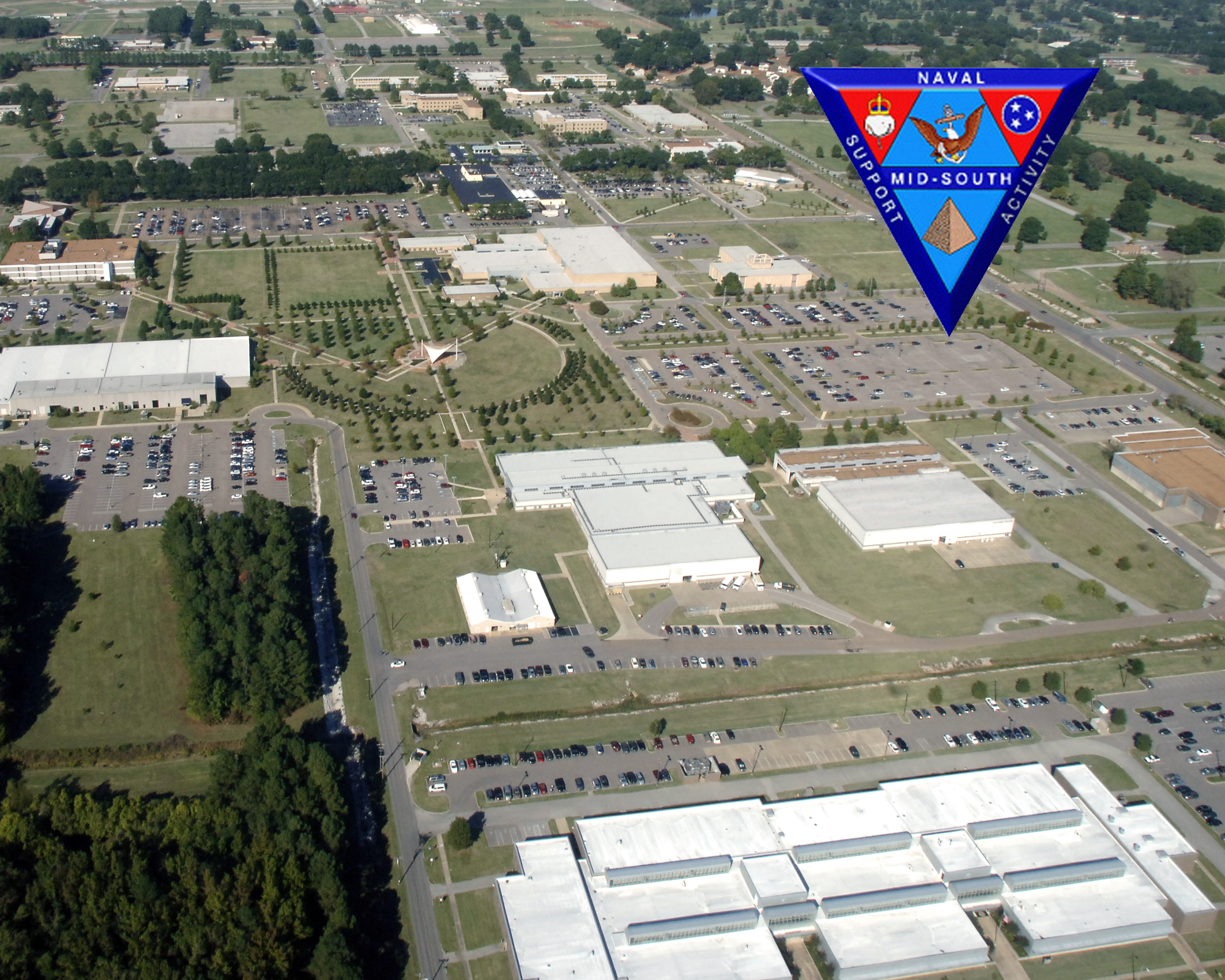
- An aerial view of NSA Mid-South during October 2008

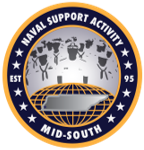

Site information
- Type: Naval support activity
- Owner: Department of Defense
- Operator: US Navy
- Controlled by: Navy Region Southeast
- Condition: Operational
- Website: Official website

Location
- Location within Tennessee Location within the United States
- Coordinates: 35°20′05″N 089°52′09″W

Site history
- Built: 1917 (as Park Field)
- In use: 1917 – present
- Events: Navy Ten Nautical Miler

Garrison information
- Current commander: Captain Mike Mosbruger

Naval Support Activity Mid-South (NSA Mid-South, NAVSUPPACT Mid-South, NSAMS), in Millington, Tennessee, is a base of the United States Navy. A part of the Navy Region Southeast and the Navy Installations Command, NSA Mid-South serves as the Navy’s Human Resources Center of Excellence. The base is host to several commands and other military tenants: Navy Personnel Command, Navy Recruiting Command, the Navy Manpower Analysis Center, a Marine Corps Reserve Company - Bridge Company C (6th Engineer Support Battalion (ESB), 4th Marine Logistics Group (MLG)) and the US Army Corps of Engineers Finance Center. More than 7,500 military, civilian, and contract personnel are assigned/work on base.

Initially established as Park Field, it was one of thirty-two Air Service training camps established after the United States entry into World War I in April 1917.

The NSA has over 7,500 enlisted and officer personnel, civilians, and full-time contract personnel, who provide all essential logistic and operational support to the commands and activities on board. As the base has evolved and changed, so has its impact on the area. It plays an important part in the community and is one of the largest single employers in the state of Tennessee.

== Major commands aboard NSA Mid-South ==
Of the more than 30 tenant commands that are located aboard Naval Support Activity Mid-South, these are some of the major commands:

- Navy Personnel Command
- Navy Recruiting Command
- Navy Manpower Analysis Center
- Navy Personnel Research, Studies, and Technology
- Bridge Company C, 6th ESB, 4th Marine Logistics Group, Marine Forces Reserve
- U.S. Army Corps of Engineers Finance Center

== Community involvement ==
Throughout the year, NSA Mid-South partners with the Millington and Memphis communities to put on several projects:

- Flag City Freedom Celebration - the annual Fourth of July fireworks display, seeing more than 40,000 visitors to NSA Mid-South's Navy Lake recreational facility.
- National Night Out - a community-police awareness-raising event held the first Tuesday of August. NSA Mid-South's NNO event is one of the largest nationwide.
- Leadership Millington - a leadership program sponsored by the Millington Chamber of Commerce, which includes a day touring NSA Mid-South.

== Navy Ten Nautical Miler ==
Beginning in 2010, Naval Support Activity Mid-South sponsors the Navy Ten Nautical Miler, the first and only race measured in nautical miles instead of statute miles. The world-class foot race, intended to take the place of the Navy’s previous premiere race, the Blue Angels Marathon, attracts runners from all over the world.

== History ==
Initially known as Park Field, the facility was established as a World War I training base in 1917. It was named after First Lieutenant Joseph D. Park, who was killed on 9 May 1913 when a military biplane which he was flying plunged nose-first into a gulley, turned a somersault, and crashed against a tree at Olive, California, 39 miles (63 km) southeast of Los Angeles. The aviator fell only 15 feet (4.6 m), but the radiator crushed his head, and then fell upon his body.

=== World War I ===
The United States entered World War I on 6 April 1917, and the United States Department of War sent a cadre of officers to the Memphis area to survey sites for an aviation school. The group decided on a location in the Millington area, about 16 miles (26 km) northeast of Memphis, an agreement to lease the land for the Army was concluded, and the United States Army Signal Corps — which managed U.S. Army aviation in its early days — established the Park Field site in May 1917. The construction of some 50 buildings began.

Park Field covered over 700 acres (280 ha) and could accommodate up to 1,000 personnel. Dozens of wooden buildings served as headquarters and maintenance facilities and officers’ quarters. Enlisted men had to bivouac in tents. The first unit stationed there was the 160th Aero Squadron, which was transferred from Kelly Field, Texas, in November 1917. A few United States Army Air Service aircraft arrived with the 160th, Most of the Curtiss JN-4 Jennys to be used for flight training were shipped in wooden crates by railcar.

Park Field served as a base for flight training for the United States Army Air Service. In 1917, flight training occurred in two phases: primary and advanced. Primary training took eight weeks and consisted of pilots learning basic flight skills under dual and solo instruction with a student capacity of 300. After completion of their primary training, flight cadets were then transferred to another base for advanced training.

Training units assigned to Park Field were:

- Post Headquarters, Park Field, December 1917–July 1919
- 65th Aero Squadron (II), April 1918 Transferred from Kelly Field, Texas)

Re-designated as Squadron "A", July–December 1918

- 87th Aero Squadron, December 1917 (Transferred from Selfridge Field, Michigan)

Re-designated as Squadron "B", July–December 1918

- 160th Aero Squadron, December 1917 (Transferred from Kelly Field, Texas)

Re-designated as Squadron "C", July–December 1918

- 214th Aero Squadron, December 1917

Re-designated as Squadron "D", July–December 1918

- Squadron "E", August–December 1918
- Flying School Detachment (Consolidation of Squadrons A-E, December 1918-July 1919

By February 1918, flight operations were in full swing, but with the sudden end of World War I on 11 November 1918, the future operational status of Park Field was unknown. Cadets in flight training on 11 November were allowed to complete their training, but no new cadets were assigned to the base. The separate training squadrons were consolidated into a single Flying School detachment in December 1918, as many of the personnel assigned were being demobilized. Flight training activities ceased in July 1919.

=== Inter-war years ===
In March 1920 the Department of War officially purchased Park Field, and a small caretaker unit was assigned to the facility for administrative reasons. At that time the airfield began pioneering airmail routes throughout Tennessee and the surrounding states. The airfield declined until it was little more than a storage area for aircraft and parts. By 1921, the decision was made to phase down all activities at the base in accordance with sharply reduced military budgets. The Department of War ordered the small caretaker force at Park Field to dismantle all remaining structures and to sell them as surplus. The field was closed and abandoned in January 1922.

The Stock Market Crash of 1929 and the ensuing Great Depression breathed new life into Park Field. During the 1930s the field served as a transient camp for unemployed workers. In 1937 the Resettlement Administration (succeeded by the Farm Security Administration in 1937) took over the land and developed model farms used to demonstrate what could be achieved with correctly managed land. Park Field remained under Farm Security Administration's jurisdiction until the United States entered World War II in December 1941.

=== World War II ===
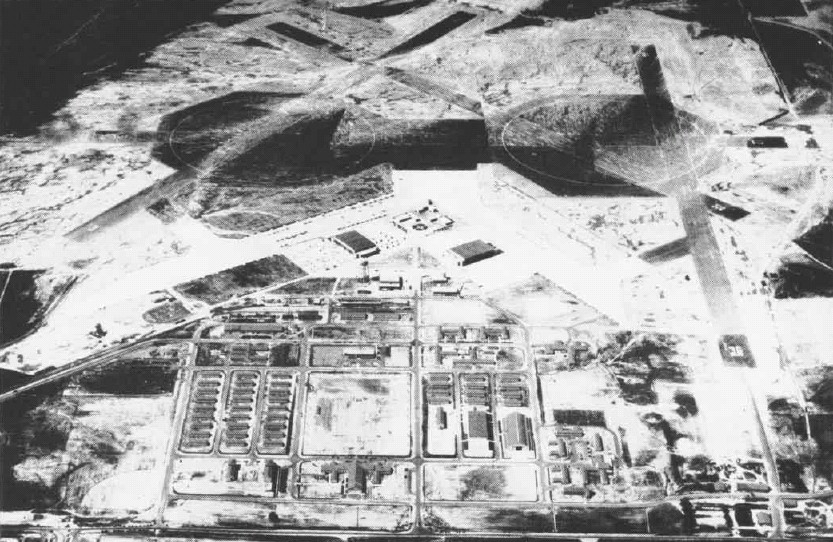
Aerial view of the Naval Air Station Memphis in the mid-1940s

Just as the onset of World War I had given Park Field its birth in 1917, the declaration of war on 8 December 1941, had similar results, heralding the arrival of naval aviation in the Memphis area. In February 1942, the Navy Shore Station Development Board recommended approval of a reserve aviation base on the former site of Park Field. On September 15, 1942, the United States Navy commissioned the Naval Reserve Aviation Base on the south side of the station.

On 1 January 1943, the Naval Reserve Aviation Base was renamed Naval Air Station Memphis. During the war, Naval Air Station (NAS) Memphis was a primary flight training center for aviators. It had a training capacity of about 600 flight cadets, and could support up to 10,000 cadets for ground crew training. The facility was expanded to about 3,500 acres (1,400 ha) in size, and it supported 16 naval outlying landing fields for training and emergency landings in the area. In 1943, the training facility was designated as the Naval Air Technical Training Center (NATT).

=== Cold War ===
The Cold War followed the conclusion of World War II. As part of the consolidation of facilities after World War II, HQ NATT was transferred to NAS Memphis in 1946 and all the operations of the command were consolidated there in 1947. In April 1949, the base's functions completely changed, and a new NAS was established, different in both scope and function.

The new NAS assumed logistic support for all the commands at Navy Memphis, except the Naval hospital. The boundaries included all Navy property on both sides of the Millington-Arlington Road (Navy Road). NAS Memphis continued its support and logistics role for approximately 50 years. The facility became a permanent naval installation during the Korean War, and during the 1950s, it supported approximately 13,000 uniformed and civilian Naval personnel. During the Vietnam War, 23,000 trainees were assigned to NAS Memphis at NATTC Memphis, which continued to provide service to the U.S. Navy into the 1990s.

=== Modern era ===
The 1993 Base Realignment and Closure Commission (BRAC) directed the realignment of NAS Memphis. The largest segments of this BRAC action were as follows:

- Disestablishment of Naval Air Technical Training Center (NATTC) Memphis, located in Millington, and the establishment of a new NATTC Pensacola at NAS Pensacola, Florida, on the grounds of the former Naval Aviation Depot (NADEP) Pensacola. (BRAC also directed the disestablishment of NADEP Pensacola).
- Relocation of all U.S. Navy and United States Marine Corps enlisted aviation "A" schools and "C" schools at NATTC Millington to NATTC Pensacola.
- Disestablishment of Naval Air Reserve Memphis and disestablishment or transfer/relocation of all assigned Naval Air Force Reserve and 4th Marine Aircraft Wing/Marine Air Reserve aircraft and aviation squadrons.
- Relocation of the Navy Personnel Command (NAVPERSCOM)/Bureau of Naval Personnel (BUPERS) from Washington, D.C., to buildings and facilities previously occupied by NATTC Memphis.

NAS Memphis was redesignated Naval Support Activity Memphis on 30 September 1995. The name was changed again to Naval Support Activity Mid-South on 1 October 1998 to more accurately identify the base's mission requirements and to reflect the Navy's approach to regionalization.

In September 2015, Bridge Company C, part of the 6th Engineer Support Battalion, 4th Marine Logistics Group, dedicated a new building for the Bridge Company at NSA Mid-South. It was the first time since the BRAC-directed changes of 1993 that a U.S. Marine Corps unit had resided on the base.

=== Guardsman shooting on 24 October 2013 ===
On 24 October 2013 a gunman shot and injured two Army National Guard soldiers at NSA Mid-South. The suspect was taken into custody after the shooting. The two injured soldiers had no life-threatening injuries.

== See also ==
- List of Training Section Air Service airfields
