= Loosahatchie River =

Coordinates: 35.2039743°N 89.1767333°W

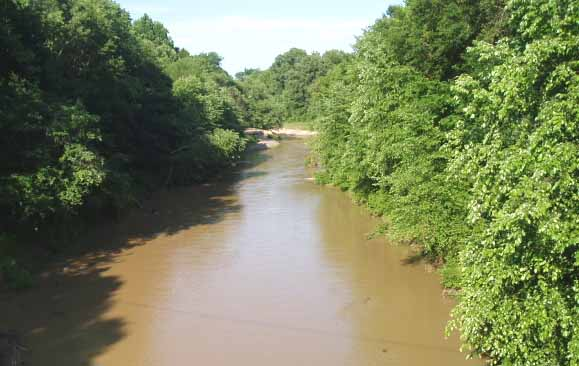
- The Loosahatchie River at Arlington, Tennessee

Location
- Country: United States
- State: Tennessee

Physical characteristics
- Source
  - location: Hardeman County, Tennessee
  - elevation: 207 ft (63 m)
- Mouth
  - location: Mississippi River
- Length: 64 mi (103 km)

The Loosahatchie River is a 64.0-mile-long (103.0 km) stream in southwestern Tennessee. Except for a few miles near its head, its mouth, and near the middle of its length, it has been entirely channelized, as have its major tributaries, for agriculture purposes. Its drainage basin was once the site of extensive cotton plantings, which have been greatly diminished in recent decades by extensive urbanization of the area.

The Loosahatchie rises in the westernmost part of Hardeman County, Tennessee, and flows largely east to west throughout its length. It enters Fayette County, Tennessee, flowing through Somerville, and is crossed west of there by Interstate 40 in the only unchannelized portion of its midcourse. It then flows into Shelby County. Its mouth is slightly north of the Memphis suburb of Frayser. It meets the Mississippi north of the mouth of the Wolf River near Mud Island. Slightly downstream from its mouth in the main Mississippi channel is the Loosahatchie Bar, which is named for it.

The name "Loosahatchie River" is partially redundant—the word "hatchie" is one of many words for "river" in several Muskogean languages native to the Southeast.

== See also ==
- List of Tennessee rivers
