= Munford, Tennessee =

- City
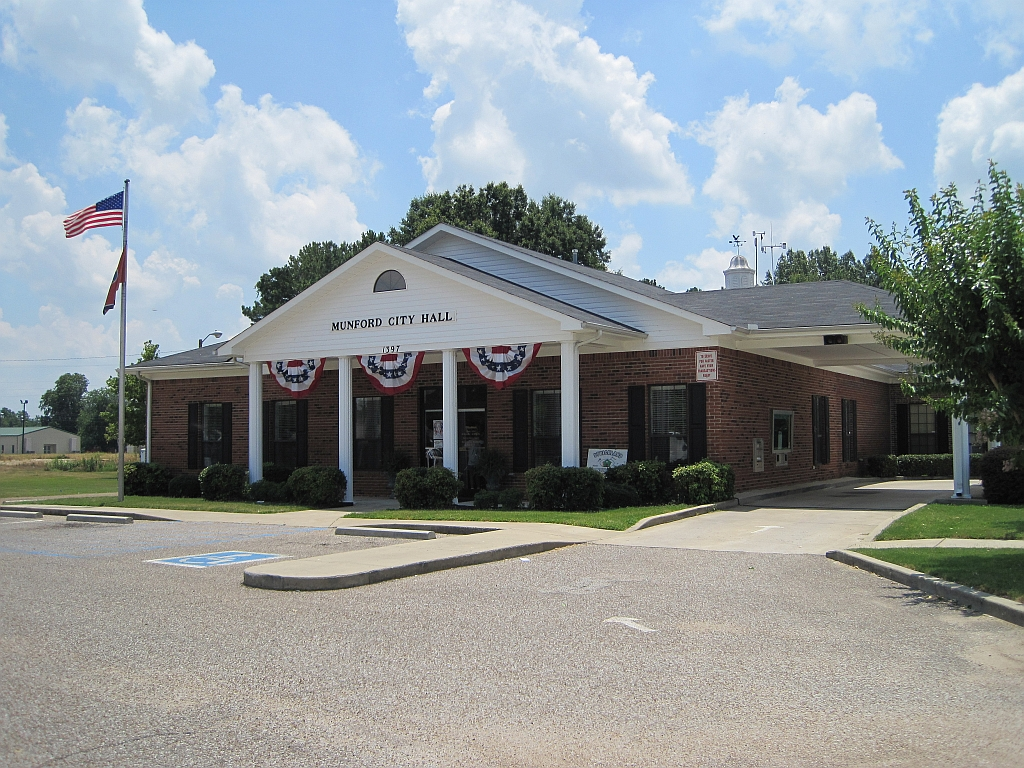
- Munford City Hall

- Location of Munford in Tipton County, Tennessee.
- Coordinates: 35°26′41″N 89°48′38″W
- Country: United States
- State: Tennessee
- County: Tipton

Area
  - Total: 9.49 sq mi (24.58 km^{2})
  - Land: 9.48 sq mi (24.55 km^{2})
  - Water: 0.015 sq mi (0.04 km^{2})
- Elevation: 446 ft (136 m)

Population (2020)
  - Total: 6,302
  - Density: 664.9/sq mi (256.73/km^{2})
- Time zone: UTC-6 (Central (CST))
  - Summer (DST): UTC-5 (CDT)
- ZIP code: 38058
- Area code: 901
- FIPS code: 47-51540
- GNIS feature ID: 1295096
- Website: munford.com

Munford is a city in Tipton County, Tennessee. As of the 2020 census, Munford had a population of 6,302. It was listed as a town at the 2010 census.

== History ==
Beginning as a small village which grew around the Mt. Zion Methodist Episcopal Church in the early 1850s, it was officially named "Mt. Zion" after the opening of a post office there in 1856. This office closed in 1874, and in 1886 when Mt. Zion applied to the United States Post Office Department to have it reopened, the application was approved on the condition that it do so with a new name, to avoid confusion with Mt. Zion, Pennsylvania. At that time Pennsylvania was commonly abbreviated as "Penn" and Tennessee was commonly abbreviated "Tenn." The newly appointed Post Master G. B. Sale asked his daughter Lola to choose a name, and they agreed to name it after Colonel Richard Henry Munford (1807–1884) of Covington, Tennessee. The town was officially incorporated as "Munford" by an act of the Tennessee General Assembly in 1905, and Sterling Hicks Bass Sr. was elected as its first mayor.

== Geography ==
Munford is located at 35°26′41″N 89°48′38″W.

According to the United States Census Bureau, the city has a total area of 8.1 square miles (21 km^{2}), of which 8.0 square miles (21 km^{2}) is land and 0.12% is water.

== Demographics ==
Historical population
Census	Pop.	Note	%±
1910	329		—
1920	382		16.1%
1930	376		−1.6%
1940	407		8.2%
1950	976		139.8%
1960	1,014		3.9%
1970	1,281		26.3%
1980	2,336		82.4%
1990	2,326		−0.4%
2000	4,708		102.4%
2010	5,927		25.9%
2020	6,302		6.3%
2025 (est.)	6,996	▲	11.0%

=== 2020 census ===
As of the 2020 census, Munford had a population of 6,302, 2,349 households, and 1,898 families residing in the city. The median age was 38.5 years. 25.3% of residents were under the age of 18 and 15.4% of residents were 65 years of age or older. For every 100 females there were 97.5 males, and for every 100 females age 18 and over there were 89.8 males age 18 and over.

Of the 2,349 households in Munford, 37.3% had children under the age of 18 living in them. Of all households, 52.0% were married-couple households, 14.9% were households with a male householder and no spouse or partner present, and 28.0% were households with a female householder and no spouse or partner present. About 22.3% of all households were made up of individuals and 11.0% had someone living alone who was 65 years of age or older.

There were 2,481 housing units, of which 5.3% were vacant. The homeowner vacancy rate was 1.4% and the rental vacancy rate was 5.4%.

53.8% of residents lived in urban areas, while 46.2% lived in rural areas.

Racial composition as of the 2020 census
Race	Number	Percent
White	5,110	81.1%
Black or African American	544	8.6%
American Indian and Alaska Native	27	0.4%
Asian	80	1.3%
Native Hawaiian and Other Pacific Islander	7	0.1%
Some other race	110	1.7%
Two or more races	424	6.7%
Hispanic or Latino (of any race)	271	4.3%

=== 2010 census ===
As of the census of 2010, there were 5,927 people, 2,174 households, and 1,667 families residing in the town. The racial makeup of the town was 87.90% White, 7.20% African American, 0.4% Native American, and 1.5% Asian. Hispanic or Latino of any race were 3.00% of the population.

There were 2,174 households, out of which 42.2% had children under the age of 18 living with them, 56.3% were married couples living together, 15.9% had a female householder with no husband present, and 23.3% were non-families. The average household size was 2.73 and the average family size was 3.11.

According to the 2007–2011 American Community Survey, the median household income in Munford was $56,242. 11.9% of residents were below the poverty line, including 16.5% of those under the age of 18.

== Education ==
Munford Public Schools are part of Tipton County Schools. The Tipton County School District has eight elementary schools, five middle schools and four high schools.

Schools located in Munford include:

- Munford Elementary School
- Munford Middle School
- Munford High School

John Combs is the Director of Schools.

== Munford Police Department ==
The Munford Police Department has several programs including: Neighborhood/Community Watch Program, Home Security Checks, Children's Fingerprint Identification and Photo, Traffic Safety Program, and School Career Day.

The Munford Police Department also has a S.W.A.T. team that is used in high risk situations including: hostage situations, dangerous drug situations, and blocked or "barricaded" subjects.

== Munford Fire Department ==
The fire department serves around 15,000 residents of the Munford and Atoka communities; however, "the department also serves county residents outside the corporate limits, which brings the population base up to an estimated 30,000."

The fire department not only responds to fires, but also respond to a wide range of other emergency situations including motorcycle accidents, medical emergencies, and several others. Every six months, the fire "department also remains up to date with safety inspections of all businesses." The city contains 1,300 fire hydrants, which are provided by the Munford Fire Department.

"The priorities of the department are clear: Life Safety, Emergency Incident Stabilization, and Property Conservation."

== Celebrate Munford ==
Celebrate Munford is a "non-profit group of citizens" in the Munford community, and areas surrounding Munford. The group is always looking for new members to lead the events.

Celebrate Munford has been hosting an annual event in downtown Munford since 1984, The Munford Arts and Crafts Fair. The fair is the third Saturday of September every year. The fair lasts all day and is packed full with booths and vendors. Vendors are welcomed to reserve a booth spot. Fair food is also available at several booths. Stages that are booked with entertainers are also at the fair. There are various music styles played and dances performed. In addition, there is also a car show held in the City Park on the same day as the fair.

Every Fourth of July, the Celebrate Munford group sponsors the Celebrate Independence. The event is located at the Munford City Park, across from the skate park. The United States Navy band plays for everyone as they picnic and socialize. As the band plays their finale, a firework show begins.
