= Kerrville, Tennessee =

Community in Tennessee, United States

- Unincorporated community
- Location within Tennessee Location within the United States
- Coordinates: 35°22′59″N 89°51′29″W
- Country: United States
- State: Tennessee
- County: Shelby
- Postal code: 38053
- Area code: 901

Kerrville is an unincorporated community on the northeast portion of Shelby County, Tennessee, United States. Kerrville is located along about 3.5 miles to the north of Millington and just to the south of the Tipton County line, along with Atoka and Munford city limits. It is named for Andrew Hart Kerr, who moved from Middle Tennessee to Big Creek and purchased 5,000 acres of land.

== History ==
According to the Shelby County Register of Deeds, Kerrville was laid out around 1873 along the Paducah and Memphis Railroad (now the Canadian National Railway). The 44 acre parcel of land was donated in 1874 by A.H. Kerr to the railroad for a railway station and small town (hence its name). Many of the streets on the plat do not exist as of today, but "Old Randolph Road" exists as Kerrville-Rosemark Road south of the railroad, and Sullivan Road north of the tracks. The area of the railroad station is now part of Gin Road.

Today, the area is mainly occupied by a few residences and a barbecue restaurant. The center of the area is located at the intersections of Mudville Road, Kerrville-Rosemark Road, Old Tipton Road, and Sullivan Road. It is less than half a mile from U.S. Route 51. Kerrville is located within the Millington annexation reserve.

== Notable people ==
- Earl Harris, longtime member of the Indiana House of Representatives
