= Northaven, Tennessee =

Unincorporated community in Tennessee, United States

Coordinates: 35°16′01″N 90°02′53″W

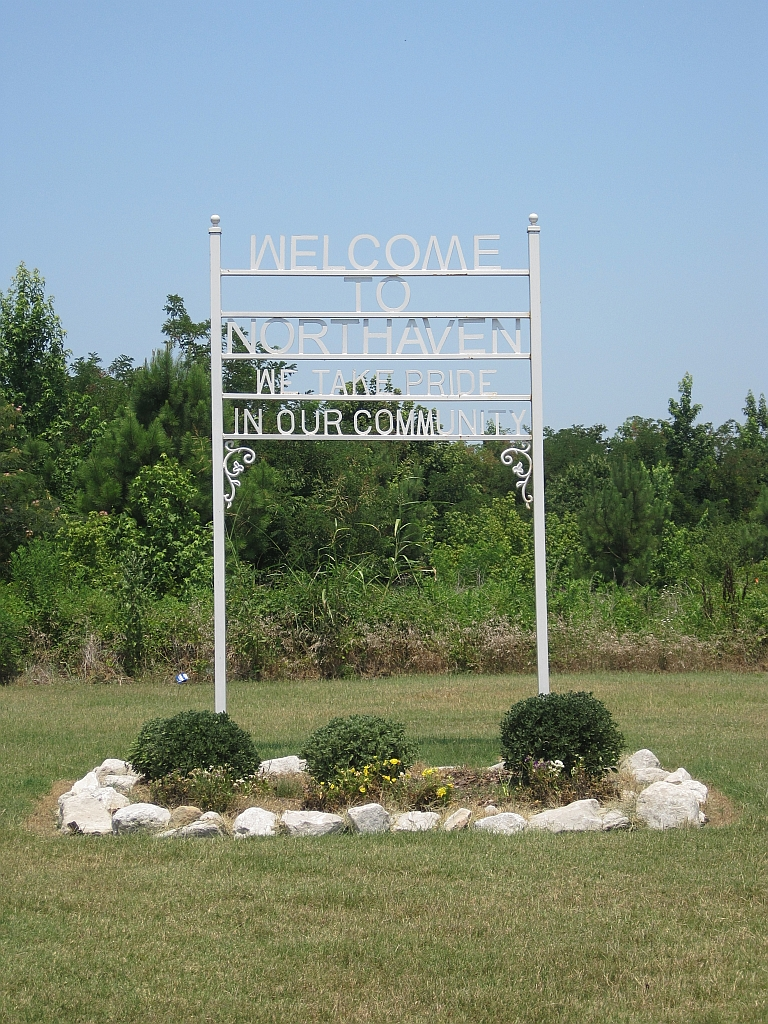
Northaven sign

Northaven is an unincorporated community located in north Shelby County, Tennessee, United States, that is a part of the Memphis metropolitan area. Tennessee State Route 388 connects Northaven with Frayser and Shelby Forest. The Mississippi River Trail runs through the neighborhood.

== Geography ==
Northaven boundaries are the Mississippi River in the west, Millington and Memphis in the north, Raleigh in the east, the Wolf River and Frayser in the south.

== Education ==
Northaven Elementary School, which is part of the Shelby County School System serves the community.

== Tornado ==
On December 14, 1987, an F3 tornado crossed the Mississippi River and moved through Northaven, where it destroyed 30 homes and severely damaged 58 others, injuring 21 people. The tornado had previously struck West Memphis, Arkansas, where damage was far more extensive, with six deaths and more than 1500 left homeless.
