= Raleigh-Egypt High School =

Public high school in Memphis, Tennessee

- 3970 Voltaire Ave; Memphis, Tennessee 38128; United States

Information
- Founded: 1969
- School district: Shelby County Schools
- Principal: Shari Meeks
- Teaching staff: 31.84 (FTE)
- Grades: 9–12
- Enrollment: 733 (2023–2024)
- Student to teacher ratio: 23.02
- Colors: Black; Red; White
- Nickname: Pharaohs

Raleigh-Egypt High School (REHS) is a secondary school (grades 9–12) located at 3970 Voltaire Road in Raleigh, a section of Memphis, Tennessee, United States. It is part of the Shelby County Schools district. It shares a campus with Egypt Central Elementary School and Raleigh-Egypt Middle School. The high school has an enrollment of 595 as of school year 2019–2020.

When REHS was built in 1969, it was part of the Shelby County School System. It came under the Memphis City School system after Raleigh was annexed by Memphis in 1972. In 2014, Shelby County Schools retook control of Raleigh-Egypt High School and all other Memphis City Schools.

REHS was racially integrated at its beginning but, like the rest of the Shelby County Schools, has since resegregated due to white flight. Currently, 82% of students are Black and 14% are Hispanic.

The original school principal, Ernest Chism, was a member of the Shelby County School Board from 2002 to 2013.

== School name, colors and mascot ==
Raleigh Egypt High's name reflects two areas it serves: Raleigh, a large, previously incorporated area in north-central Memphis, and Egypt, a small unincorporated community that was one of the earliest settlements in Shelby County. Picking up on the latter name, the school's athletic teams are called The Pharaohs, the mascot is a Pharaoh, the yearbook is The Sphinx, and the student newspaper is The Scroll. The school's colors are red, white and black.

== Sports ==
Raleigh Egypt won state titles in Boys' Cross Country in 1972 and 1973, and Boys' Track in 2004. REHS has been in many other championship competitions.

== Notable alumni ==
- Dom Chiti, former baseball player and current coach for the New York Mets
- Duke Calhoun, wide receiver four-year starter for the University of Memphis who played for the New York Giants, Saskatchewan Roughriders, and the Oakland Raiders
- Quinton "Rampage" Jackson - professional Mixed Martial Artist, former UFC Light-Heavyweight champion
- Arnett Moultrie, former NBA player.
