= Tennessee State Route 388 =

State highway in Tennessee, United States

State Route 388
- North Watkins Street
- TN 388 highlighted in red

Route information
- Maintained by TDOT
- Length: 6.8 mi (10.9 km)
- Existed: July 1, 1983–present

Major junctions
- South end: US 51 near Memphis
- North end: Great River Road (Locke–Cuba Road) near Shelby Forest

Location
- Country: United States
- State: Tennessee
- Counties: Shelby

Highway system
- Tennessee State Routes; Interstate; US; State
← SR 387	→ SR 389

State Route 388 (SR 388) is a four-lane divided highway in Shelby County, Tennessee. The route connects the Frayser neighborhood of Memphis with Northaven and Shelby Forest. The entire route is known locally as North Watkins Street.

== Route description ==
Although Watkins Street begins at Union Avenue in Memphis and passes through North Memphis and the Frayser neighborhood, the state route designation begins at the intersection of Watkins Street and Thomas Street (US 51/SR 3). Continuing north, SR 388 crosses over the Loosahatchie River; this is the last crossing before the river empties into the Mississippi River. After this crossing, SR 388 passes to the east of the Northaven community. Continuing northward, SR 388 abruptly ends at the two-lane Locke–Cuba Road. By turning onto this road, one can get to the Shelby Forest community and Meeman-Shelby Forest State Park.

== History ==
The road was first extended from North Watkins and US 51 to around Robertson Road in the early 1970s. At the time, the official name of SR 388 was "Great River Road". When the route was extended to its current terminus in the late 1970s and early 1980s, the name "North Watkins Street" was given to the entire stretch. Even though this is the official name, SR 388 is part of the Great River Road and is a National Scenic Byway.

== Major intersections ==
The entire route is in Shelby County.

Location	mi	km	Destinations	Notes
Memphis	0.0	0.0	US 51 (N. Thomas Street; SR 3) / Great River Road south	
	6.8	10.9	Great River Road north (Locke–Cuba Road)	End state maintenance; Great River Road continues north to SR 59
1.000 mi = 1.609 km; 1.000 km = 0.621 mi
