= Shelby Forest =

Shelby Forest may refer to:

- Shelby Forest, Tennessee, an unincorporated community in Shelby County, Tennessee
- Meeman-Shelby Forest State Park, a state park adjacent to the community
