= Adkison =

Adkison refers to:

- Joseph B. Adkison (1892-1965), American Medal of Honor recipient
- Kathleen Gemberling Adkison (1917-2010), American woman artist
- Peter Adkison, American CEO
