= Millington-Memphis Airport =

- IATA: NQA; ICAO: KNQA; FAA LID: NQA

Summary
- Airport type: Public
- Operator: Millington Airport Authority
- Serves: Memphis metropolitan area
- Location: Millington, Tennessee
- Elevation AMSL: 320 ft (98 m)
- Coordinates: 35°21′24″N 89°52′13″W

Map
- Location of airport in Tennessee NQA (the United States)

Runways
Direction	Length		Surface
Direction	ft	m	Surface
4/22	8,000	2,438	Asphalt/concrete

The Millington-Memphis Airport (IATA: NQA, ICAO: KNQA, FAA LID: NQA) (formerly known as Millington Municipal Airport or Millington Regional Jetport) is a public airport in the city of Millington, Tennessee, in Shelby County, United States. The airport is located 16 miles (26 km) north of Memphis. It was historically known as Naval Air Station Memphis, and it still provides support to military aircraft visiting the adjacent Naval Support Activity Mid-South.

== Facilities ==
Millington-Memphis Airport covers 400 acres (162 ha) and has one runway:

- Runway 4/22: 8,000 x 200 ft (61 m). (2,438 x 61 m), surface: asphalt/concrete

Millington-Memphis Airport is home to two flight schools, CTI Professional Flight Training and the Memphis Navy Flying Club. CTI also offers a full-service FBO (CTI Aviation Services) with full-service JetA and full- and self-service AvGas.

== History ==
Military aviation first came to Memphis during World War I when the US Army leased 904 acres (366 ha) from the Memphis Chamber of Commerce. The Army established Park Field for flight training on November 26, 1907. The US Government purchased the property in 1920. Two years later, the Army closed the base.

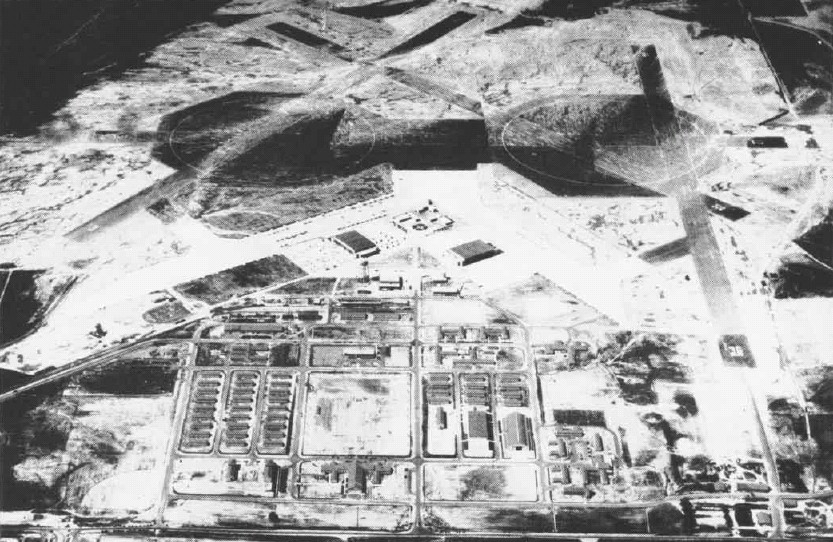
Aerial view of NAS Memphis in the mid-1940s

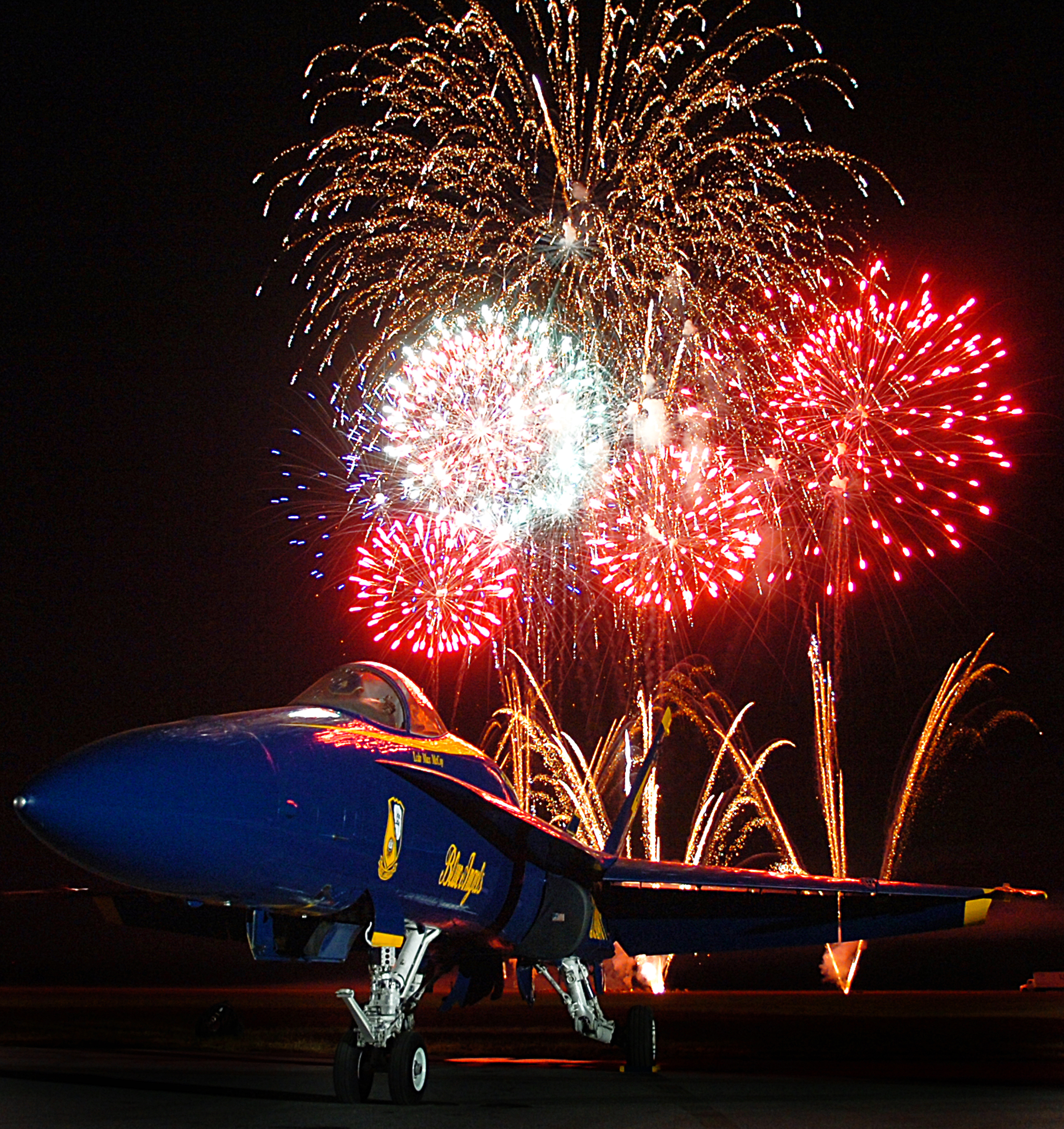
An F/A-18A Hornet, assigned to the "Blue Angels," at the airport during the 2005 Mid-South Air Show

For the next 20 years, the government used the property for various purposes, and for a time leased the airfield to a flying service. After the start of WWII, the Navy took over the property and bought an additional 1,279 acres (518 ha) for an air station and a technical training school. The Navy utilized the air station the entire war for primary training with an ultimate total of 350 N2S Stearmans. A total of 16 outlying fields were established for flight training, some of which were hard surfaced and are in evidence today.

During the postwar period of the mid-1940s through the mid-1990s, NAS Memphis hosted numerous locally based Naval Air Reserve and Marine Air Reserve flying squadrons, as well as a major naval air technical training center (NATTC Millington) that provided the bulk of enlisted aviation specialty training for the US Navy and Marine Corps. Naval flight training returned to Memphis during the 1950s when single engine jet training was conducted with the Navy version of the Lockheed T-33 by Advanced Training Units (ATU) 105 and 205.

The 1993 Base Realignment and Closure Commission report resulted in significant changes to the base's mission and its redesignation in 1995 as Naval Support Activity Memphis. The airfield and flight line were turned over to the city of Millington, which is now the Millington-Memphis Airport.

In 1998, the name of the remaining naval base (that is, non-airfield) was changed to the Naval Support Activity Mid-South to better reflect its current mission and the Navy's approach to regionalization. Naval Support Activity Mid-South is one of the largest single employers in the state of Tennessee, with approximately 6000 military, civilian and contractor employees on 1,950 acres (7.9 km^{2}). The base hosts many tenant organizations, notably the Commander, Navy Personnel Command and the Bureau of Naval Personnel.

== Incidents ==
- On December 9, 2008, a Mitsubishi MU-2 crash-landed during an emergency landing.

== See also ==
- List of airports in Tennessee
