= Donna Harris =

Donna Harris may refer to:

- Donna Harris (politician), American politician from Indiana
- Donna Harris (The Bill), a character on the TV series The Bill
- Donna Harris, a character in the American sitcom Sanford and Son
