= Earl Harris (politician) =

American politician (1941–2015)

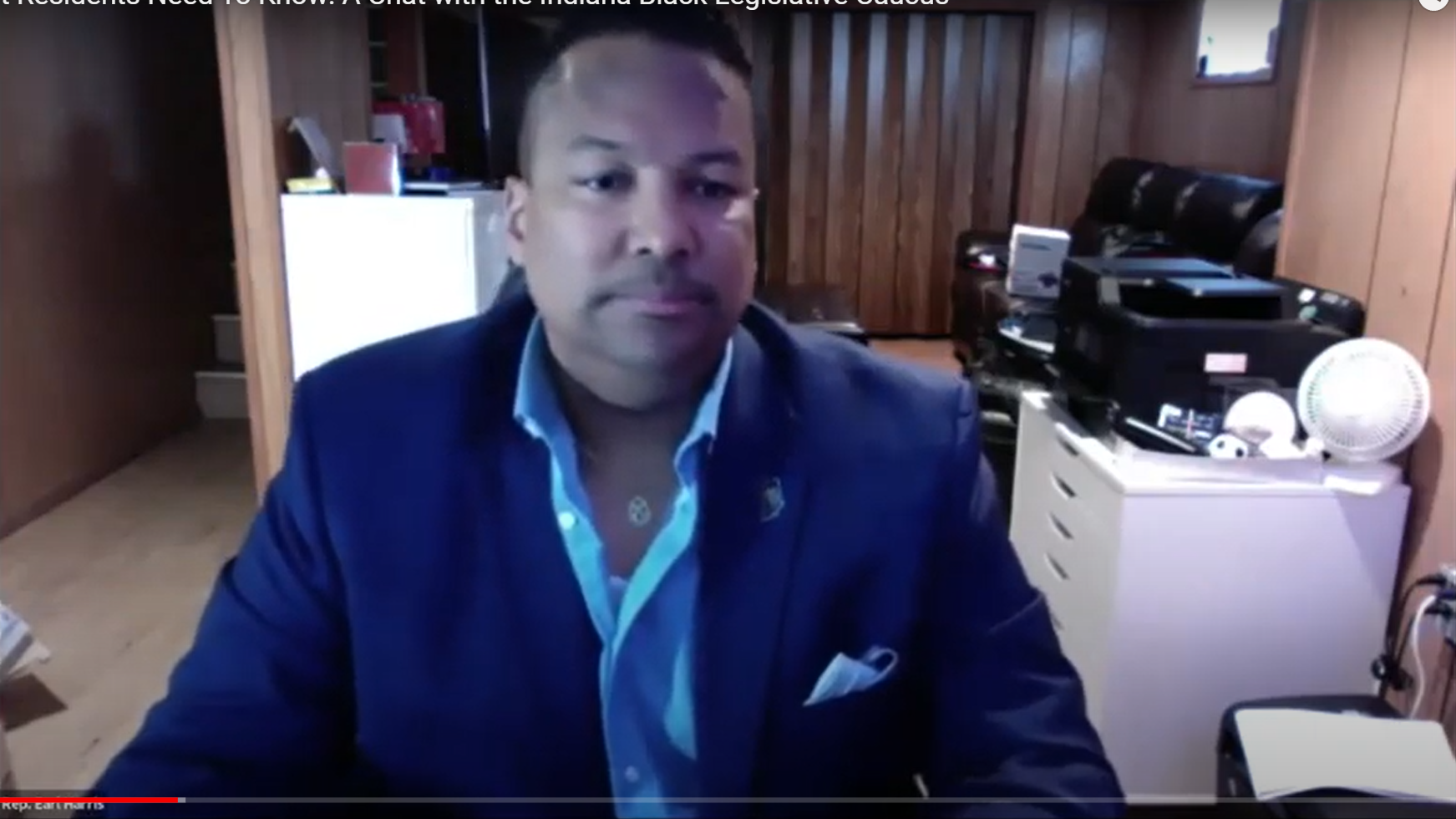
- Earl Harris at Indiana Black Legislative Caucus

Member of the Indiana House of Representatives from the 2nd district
- In office November 4, 1992 – March 23, 2015
- Preceded by: J. Bradley Fox
- Succeeded by: Donna Harris

Member of the Indiana House of Representatives from the 12th district
- In office November 3, 1982 – November 4, 1992
- Preceded by: J. Bradley Fox
- Succeeded by: Jesse Michael Villalpando, Jr.

Personal details
- Born: November 8, 1941 Kerrville, Tennessee, U.S.
- Died: March 23, 2015 (aged 73) East Chicago, Indiana, U.S.
- Party: Democratic
- Spouse: Donna Harris (m. 1969–2015)
- Relations: Earl Harris Jr. (son)

Military service
- Branch/service: United States Navy
- Unit: United States Navy Reserve

Earl L. Harris (November 8, 1941 – March 23, 2015) was an American politician who served as a member of the Indiana House of Representatives from 1982 to 2015.

== Education ==
He graduated from Woodstock High School in Tennessee in 1959. He then attended Indiana University, Purdue University, and the Illinois Institute of Technology.

== Career ==
Prior to his political career, he served as the fixed assets administrator for the East Chicago School Corp. He also served for six years in the United States Navy Reserve.

Harris was elected to the Indiana House of Representatives in 1982. He served until his death in 2015. His wife, Donna Harris, was elected to succeed him in the House on April 18, 2015. His son, Earl Harris Jr., succeeded her in the House. During his tenure, Harris was a member of the Indiana Black Legislative Caucus.
