= Atoka, Tennessee =

Town in Tipton County, Tennessee, United States

- Town
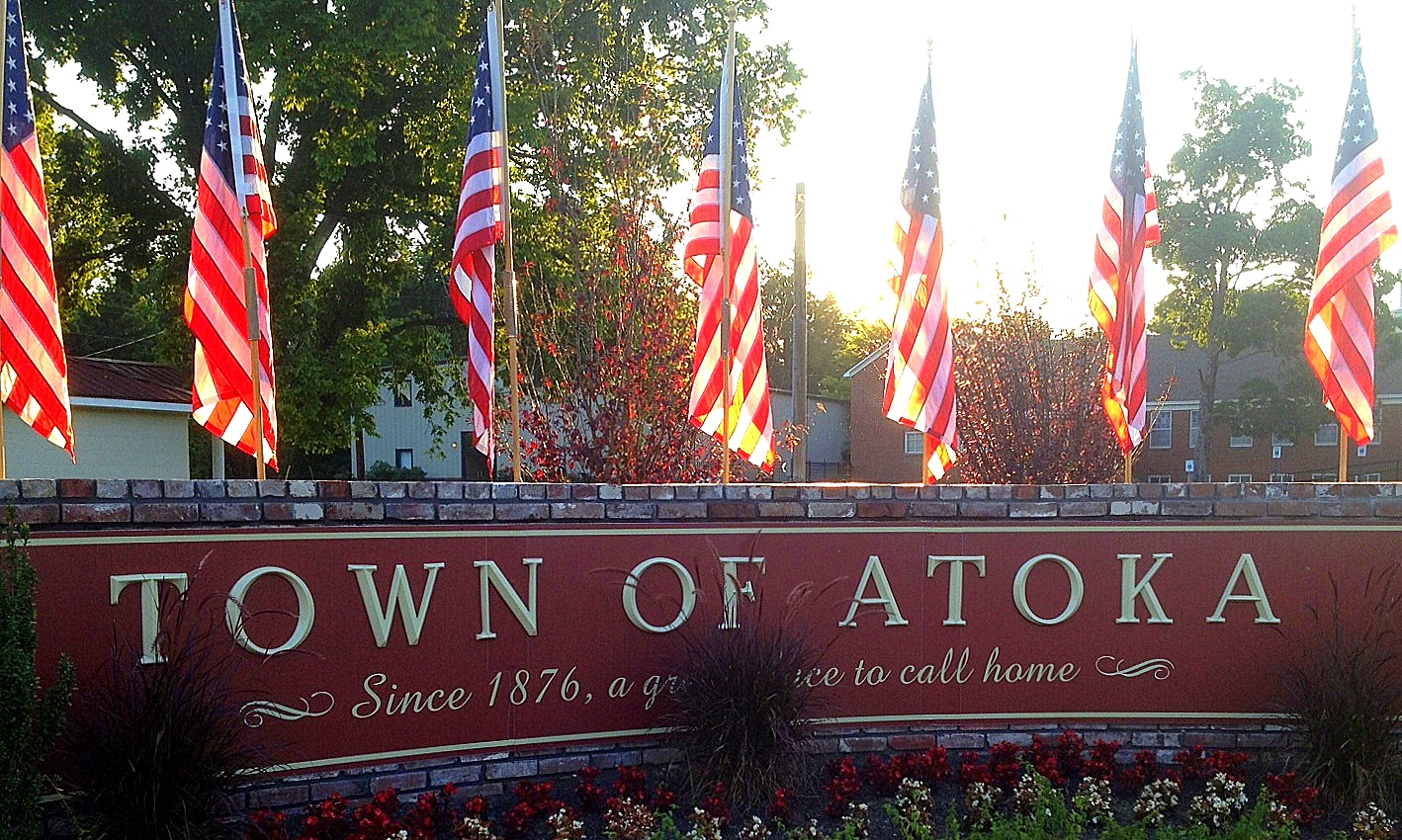

- Flag Seal

- Location of Atoka in Tipton County, Tennessee.
- Coordinates: 35°25′29″N 89°46′58″W
- Country: United States
- State: Tennessee
- County: Tipton
- Incorporated: 1838

Government
  - Mayor: Barry Akin
  - Town Administrator: Marc Woerner

Area
  - Total: 12.17 sq mi (31.52 km^{2})
  - Land: 12.13 sq mi (31.42 km^{2})
  - Water: 0.039 sq mi (0.10 km^{2})
- Elevation: 433 ft (132 m)

Population (2020)
  - Total: 10,008
  - Density: 824.9/sq mi (318.49/km^{2})
- Time zone: UTC-6 (Central (CST))
  - Summer (DST): UTC-5 (CDT)
- ZIP code: 38004
- Area code: 901
- FIPS code: 47-02340
- GNIS feature ID: 1275973
- Website: www.atokatn.gov

Atoka (/əˈtoʊkə/) is a town in Tipton County, Tennessee, United States. In 1888, Atoka was a stop on the Newport News & Mississippi Valley Railroad. Today the City of New Orleans Amtrak passenger train makes its daily route between New Orleans and Chicago, through Atoka. The population was 10,008 at the 2020 census, making the Town of Atoka the largest municipality in Tipton County.

Historians and genealogists can trace Atoka's origins back to the 1838 charter of Portersville. Atoka adopted Portersville's charter as its own. World War I Medal of Honor recipient Sgt. Joseph B. Adkison lived in Atoka, and he is buried nearby.

Five public parks exist within the town limits. The town has grown significantly since the 1990 census, at which time the population was only 659. Covington, the county seat, has the second largest population.

== History ==
=== Origins ===
From the fiftieth anniversary of the Covington Leader, 1886 to 1936:

The trading center for the Atoka area before the rise of the town was Portersville...
With the coming of the railroad in 1872 and opening of stores in Atoka, there grew up an intense rivalry between the two towns, but Atoka's advantage of the railroad proved to be too much, and Portersville gradually died out. Today not a store or store building remains in Portersville and it passes into history...

A peek into the life of John McLaughlin, a citizen of both towns, gives us some idea of what Portersville and Atoka were like:

Our subject received a collegiate education at Bellenyna College, Ireland and in 1852 came to America, landing at Charleston, S. C.; then immediately went to Chester, S. C., and spent three years learning the carriage-maker's trade, when he moved to Aberdeen, Miss., and established a factory of his own, and three years later moved to Portersville, Tipton County, and continued the business five years, then went into merchandising and farming, selling goods at Portersville two years, then moved to Atoka and continued the mercantile business over ten years, and since that time has given his attention exclusively to farming and running a steam cotton-gin, which he owns.

=== Atoka and Portersville in Tennessee, U.S.A. ===
June 1, 1796 - The Southwest Territory was admitted as the 16th state, Tennessee.

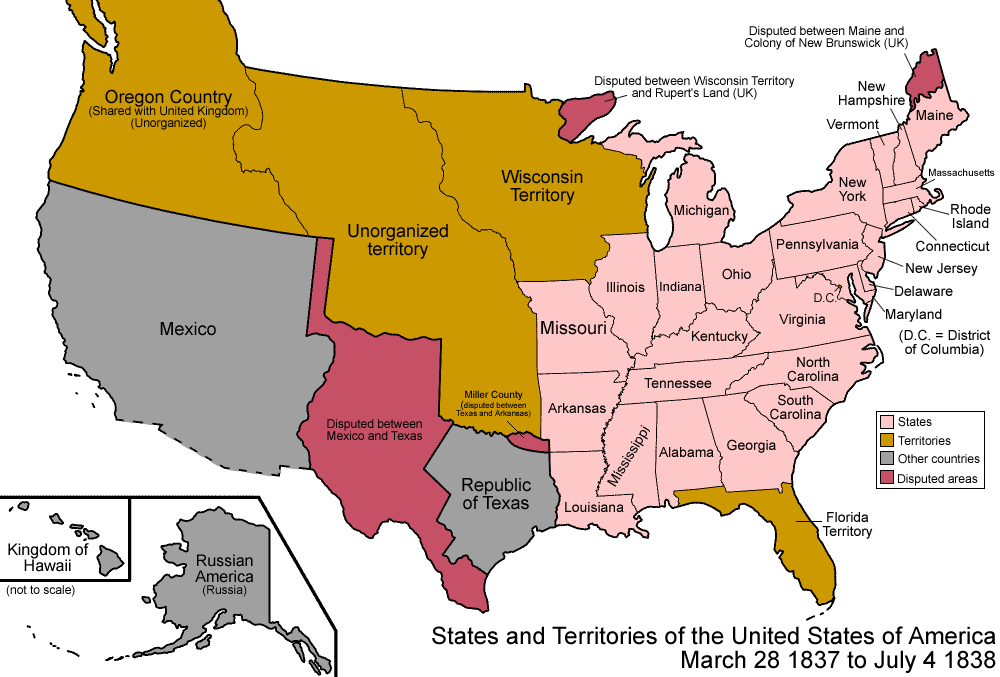
January 17, 1838 - Portersville incorporated.

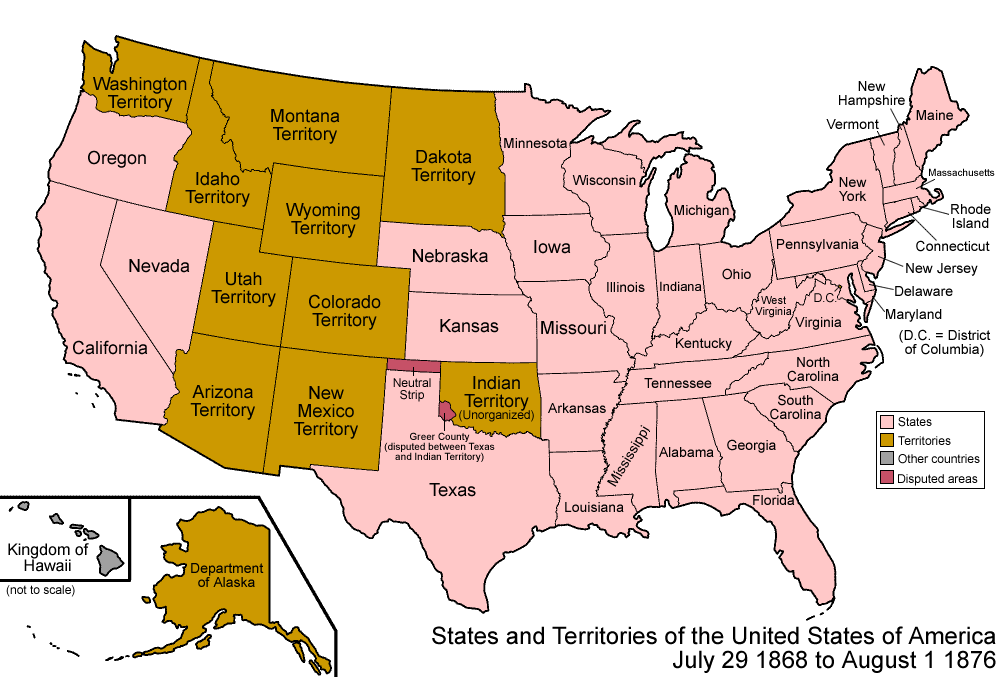
March 24, 1875 - name of Portersville changed to Atoka.

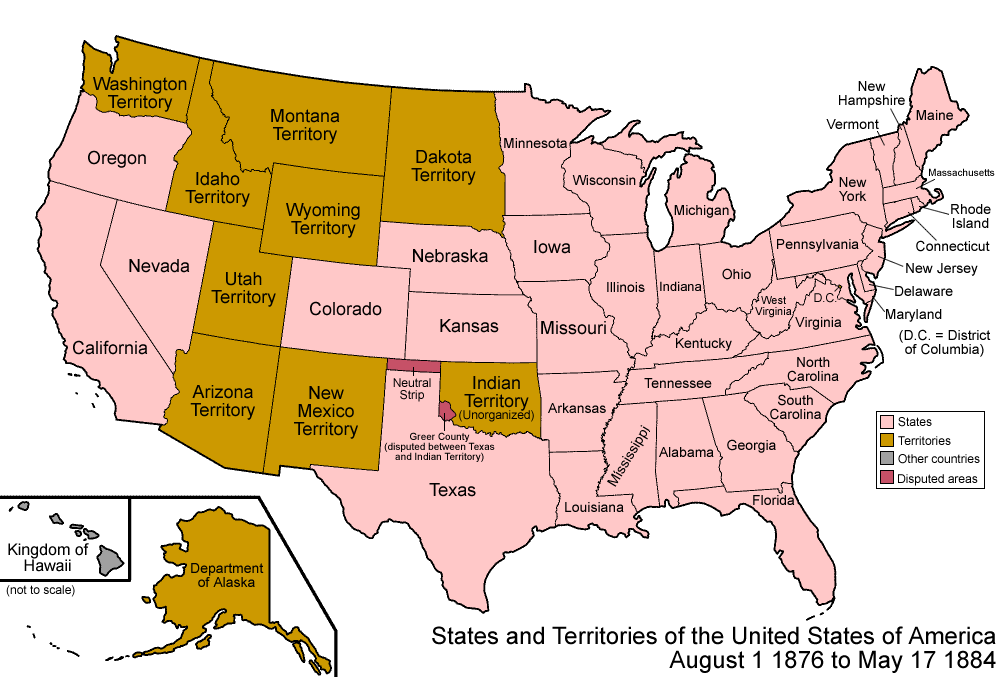
March 19, 1883 - corporation of the town of Atoka repealed.

1911 - Atoka was reincorporated.

=== Railroad ===
If the dates are taken into account, "the coming of the railroad in 1872" and "the name of Portersville changed to Atoka in 1875". These two locations, Portersville and Atoka, existed simultaneously. The railroad came to Atoka first. Then the town of Atoka was incorporated. Atoka was an unincorporated location long before it was a chartered town.

Map published c1859. Shows Porterville on Shelby and Tipton County Lines. Portersville charter was adopted by Atoka in 1875.

Map published 1872. Shows Portersville in Tipton County.

Map published in 1876. Shows gap between Covington and Dyersburg railroad connections.

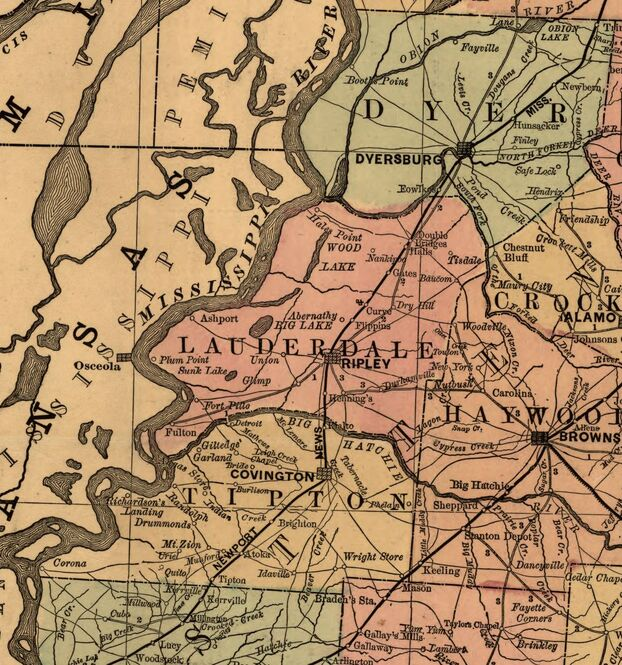
Map published in 1888. Shows Newport News & Mississippi Valley Railroad running through Tipton and Lauderdale Counties in Tennessee.

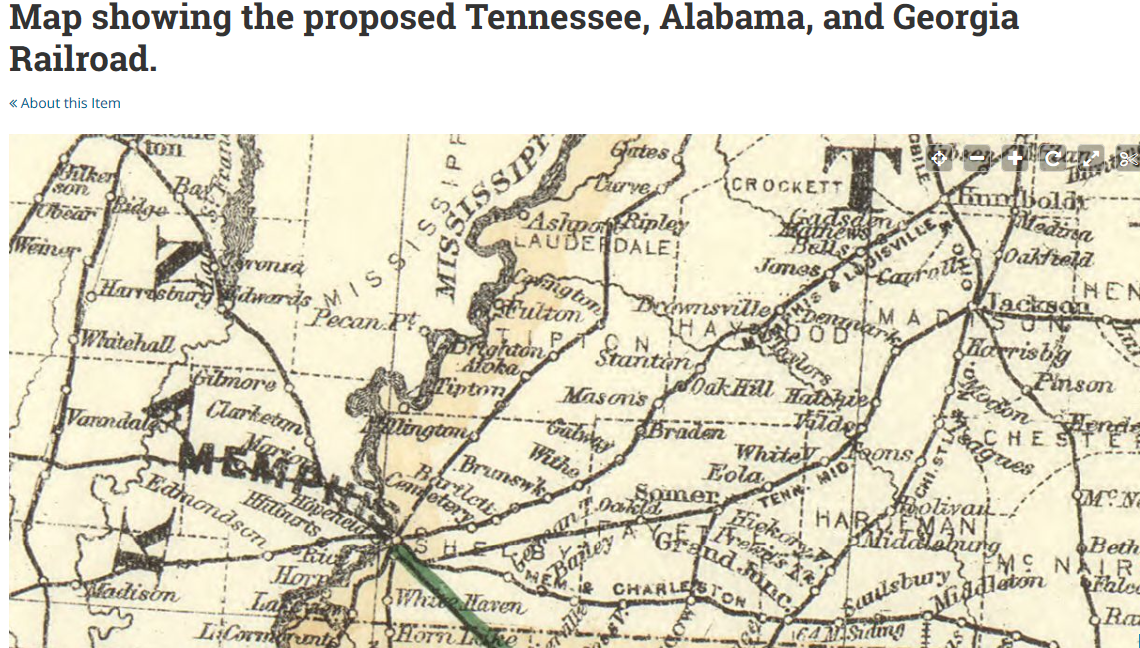
Map published in c1893, shows Atoka in Tipton County, Tennessee.

=== United States Postal Service, Rural Free Delivery in Atoka ===
The official stance of the United States Postal Service, according to an article published by the Historian of the United States Postal Service in April 2008, is that Atoka was the first post office with rural free delivery in Tennessee starting on January 11, 1897. But according to an article in Tipton County's local newspaper, published in 1936:

ATOKA ROUTE ONE IS THIRD IN UNITED STATES The first rural route established in the South and the third established in the United States was set up at Atoka in 1895. At that time the United States Post Office Department was experimenting with rural routes. They established one in the North, one in the East, and one in the South at Atoka... The first route, which was Atoka Route 1, was 16½ miles long... Route 1 was later combined with route 2, which covers the territory from Atoka to the Mississippi River.

Another article from 1936 describes more about the post office:

Atoka's first postmaster was D. Bowden. With the development of the United States' splendid rural delivery system in her post office department, the Atoka post office grew in importance. Today there are two rural routes reaching out from the town, serving that section from the Mississippi river on the west to Salem on the east. All mail for Munford, Drummonds, Richardson's Landing, Randolph and other communities passes through the post office at Atoka, whose postmaster is E. M. Quisenberry and whose rural carriers are J. E. McQuiston and R. S. McDill.

=== Town charter ===
From 1883: Portersville Charter - 1838 -- Atoka Charter - 1875

June 24, 1911 - Atoka reincorporated

1911 Charter with amendments from 2006, 1977, 1973, and 1969.

August 17, 2012 - AN ACT to amend Chapter 373, of the Private Acts of 1911.

Current Charter Information - Town of Atoka, Tennessee.

=== April 21st, 1928 Tornado ===
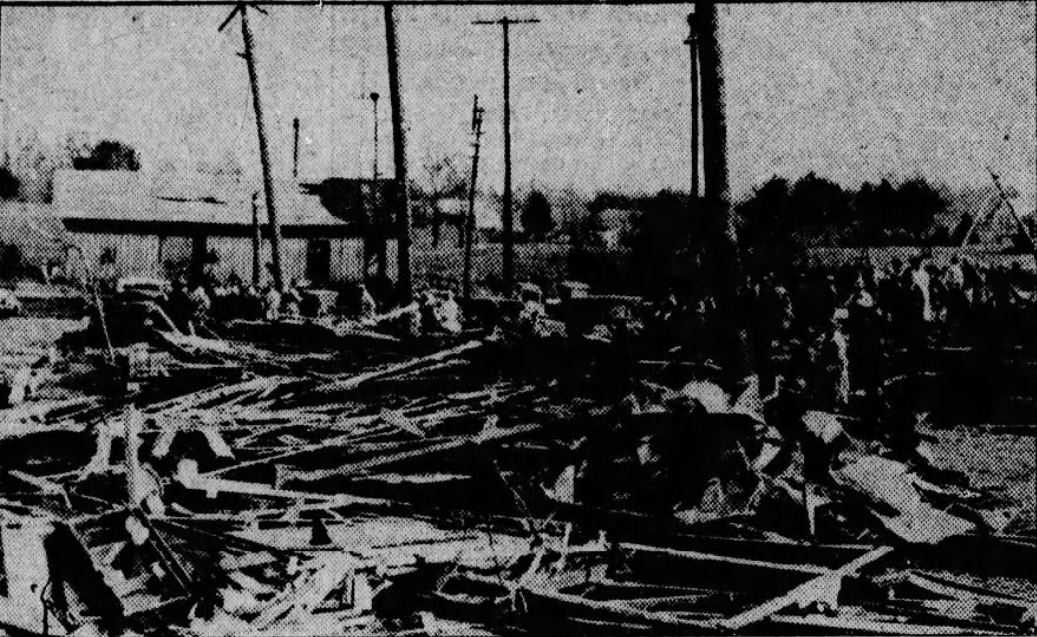
The wreckage of the Atoka, TN Post Office and General Merchandising store after the events of the April 21 1928 tornado.

On the morning of April 21st, 1928, Atoka would be struck by a tornado, causing extensive damage to the town and damaging many buildings in the business district as well as the local post office. It would subject the town to heavy costs in repair and reconstruction due to the damage.

== Geography ==
The town of Atoka is located at 35°25′29″N 89°46′58″W (35.424740, -89.782652). According to the United States Census Bureau, in 2010 the municipality had a total area of 12.36 square miles (32.0 km^{2}). The total area of land was 12.33 square miles (31.9 km^{2}) and the total of water was .03 square miles (0.078 km^{2}).

Atoka, Tennessee within Tipton County

Atoka, Tennessee is located in Tipton County, Tennessee. The County south of Tipton County is Shelby County where the city of Memphis, Tennessee is located. Tipton County is located in the Tennessee Grand Division of West Tennessee. The map of the United States gives a view of where Tennessee is located within the contiguous United States.

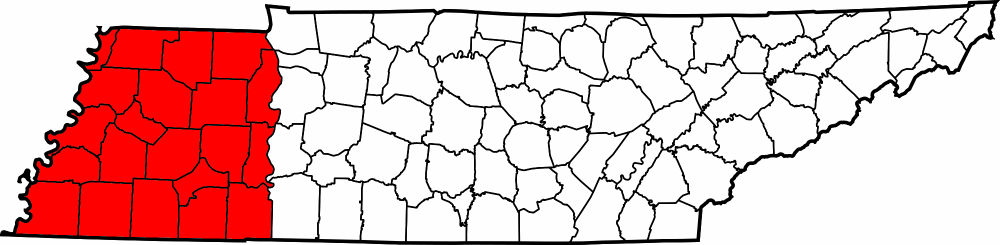
Map of West Tennessee counties

The Mississippi River defines the western border of the state of Tennessee. The Tennessee counties that have the Mississippi River as their western boundary are Shelby, Tipton, Lauderdale, Dyer, and Lake Counties. Atoka is located just east of the Mississippi River.

== Demographics ==
Historical population
Census	Pop.	Note	%±
1920	245		—
1930	222		−9.4%
1940	255		14.9%
1950	334		31.0%
1960	357		6.9%
1970	446		24.9%
1980	691		54.9%
1990	659		−4.6%
2000	3,235		390.9%
2010	8,387		159.3%
2020	10,008		19.3%
2025 (est.)	10,645	▲	6.4%

=== 2020 census ===
As of the 2020 census, Atoka had a population of 10,008, with 3,392 households and 2,395 families residing in the town.

The median age was 37.1 years. 27.7% of residents were under the age of 18 and 11.5% of residents were 65 years of age or older. For every 100 females there were 95.2 males, and for every 100 females age 18 and over there were 93.4 males age 18 and over.

81.9% of residents lived in urban areas, while 18.1% lived in rural areas.

Of the 3,392 households, 43.0% had children under the age of 18 living in them. 65.1% were married-couple households, 12.4% were households with a male householder and no spouse or partner present, and 18.0% were households with a female householder and no spouse or partner present. About 15.3% of all households were made up of individuals and 6.4% had someone living alone who was 65 years of age or older.

There were 3,478 housing units, of which 2.5% were vacant. The homeowner vacancy rate was 0.6% and the rental vacancy rate was 6.7%.

Atoka racial composition
Race	Num.	Perc.
White (non-Hispanic)	7,731	77.25%
Black or African American (non-Hispanic)	1,189	11.88%
Native American	33	0.33%
Asian	118	1.18%
Pacific Islander	16	0.16%
Other/Mixed	594	5.94%
Hispanic or Latino	327	3.27%

=== 2000 census ===
As of the census of 2000, there were 3,235 people, 1,075 households, and 935 families residing in the town. The population density was 485.0 inhabitants per square mile (187.3/km^{2}). There were 1,145 housing units at an average density of 171.7 per square mile (66.3/km^{2}). The racial makeup of the town was 87.88% White, 9.30% African American, 0.25% Native American, 0.53% Asian, 0.06% Pacific Islander, 0.31% from other races, and 1.67% from two or more races. Hispanic or Latino of any race were 2.10% of the population.

There were 1,075 households, out of which 49.2% had children under the age of 18 living with them, 75.6% were married couples living together, 7.7% had a female householder with no husband present, and 13.0% were non-families. 11.0% of all households were made up of individuals, and 2.7% had someone living alone who was 65 years of age or older. The average household size was 3.01 and the average family size was 3.24.

In the town, the population was spread out, with 31.9% under the age of 18, 6.8% from 18 to 24, 35.8% from 25 to 44, 19.8% from 45 to 64, and 5.7% who were 65 years of age or older. The median age was 32 years. For every 100 females there were 102.3 males. For every 100 females age 18 and over, there were 98.1 males.

The median income for a household in the town was $58,583, and the median income for a family was $61,643. Males had a median income of $38,721 versus $24,487 for females. The per capita income for the town was $19,644. About 3.0% of families and 4.4% of the population were below the poverty line, including 7.1% of those under age 18 and 3.7% of those age 65 or over.

== Transportation routes ==
=== Railroad ===
The Canadian National Railway is the current railroad company that owns the rails going through Atoka. This railroad runs from New Orleans, Louisiana, U.S.A., to Chicago, Illinois, U.S.A., and into Canada. The City of New Orleans, an Amtrak passenger train, still makes one trip to Illinois and another trip back to New Orleans each day, through Atoka. The previous railway owner was Illinois Central Railroad. To visitors, the railroad in Atoka may seem inactive, but the rail system is busy with regular traffic in 2019.

=== Highways ===
U.S. Route 51 passes through the western edge of the Town of Atoka, from Shelby County to the south and the town of Brighton to the north. The City of Munford meets the Town of Atoka city limits to the west and in the center of Highway 51. Highway 51 is the route south to Millington, the downtown area of Memphis. and north through Covington, Ripley, and Dyersburg.Randolph

Tennessee State Route 14 or Highway 14 or Austin Peay Highway is west of Atoka. Highway 14 goes south into the Raleigh area where Methodist North is located. It runs north to help drivers get to Brownsville.

South of Millington, or about a twenty-minute drive, is Tennessee State Route 385. Many of the areas in Shelby County can be reached from 385.

=== Mississippi River ===
Although Atoka is only about 19 minutes away from the Mississippi River at Randolph, the closest bridge that allows a car to travel to Arkansas is almost 40 minutes away - the Hernando de Soto Bridge in Memphis. The next closest bridge is located in Dyersburg.

== Education ==
Atoka Public Schools are part of Tipton County Schools. The Tipton County School District has eight elementary schools, five middle schools and four high schools. Atoka Elementary School, opened in 2008, is located in Atoka. Younger students in the Atoka area may attend any of various public schools. Dr. John Combs is the Director of Schools.
