= Earl Harris Jr. =

American politician

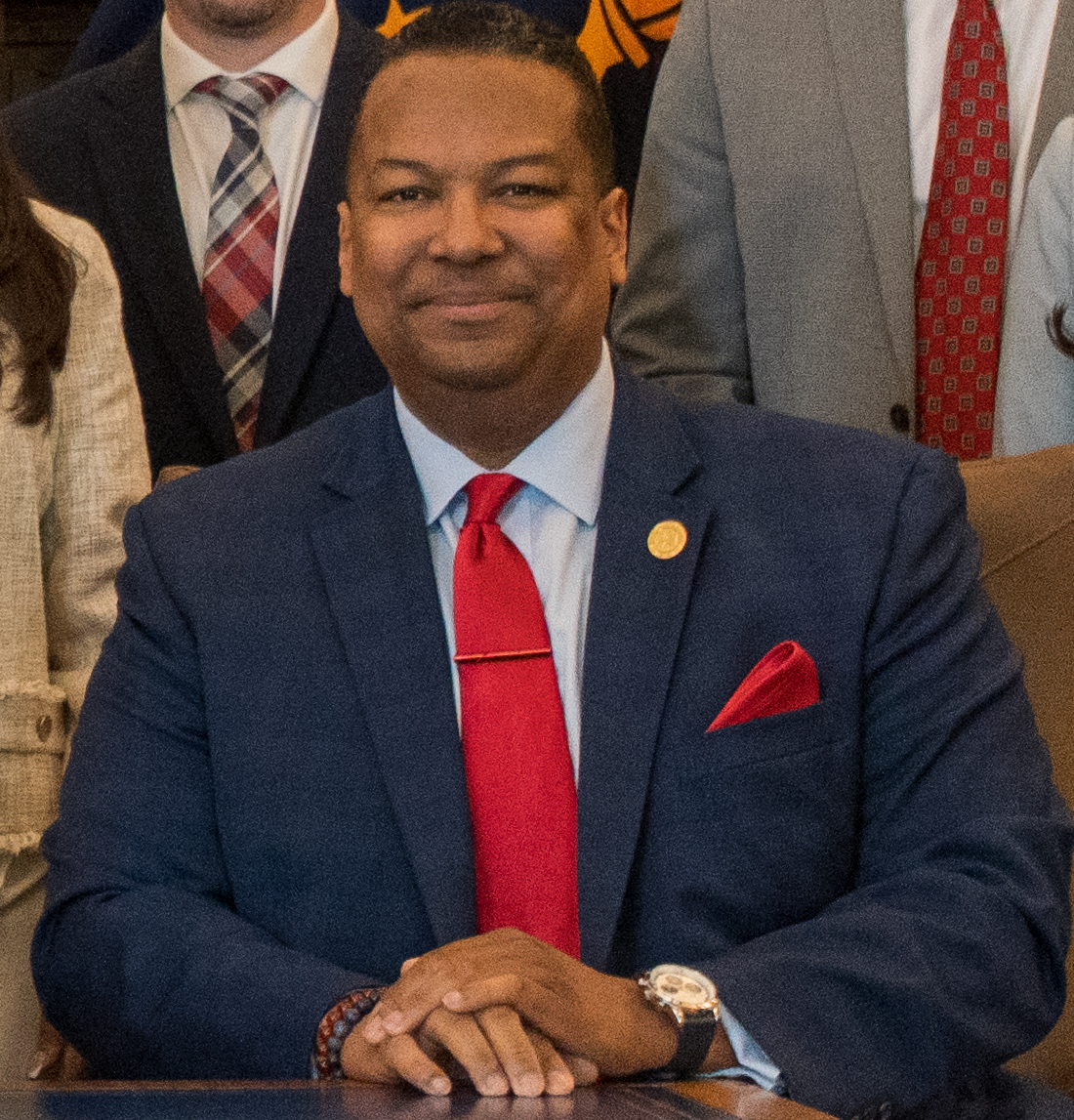

Member of the Indiana House of Representatives from the 2nd district
- Incumbent
- Assumed office November 9, 2016
- Preceded by: Donna Harris

Personal details
- Born: East Chicago, Indiana, U.S.
- Party: Democratic
- Relations: Earl Harris (father); Donna Harris (mother)
- Education: Indiana University Indianapolis (BA); Ball State University (MA)

Earl L. Harris Jr. is an American politician serving as a member of the Indiana House of Representatives from the 2nd district. He assumed office on November 9, 2016.

== Early life and education ==
Harris is a native of East Chicago, Indiana. He earned a Bachelor of Arts degree in telecommunications from Indiana University Indianapolis and a Master of Arts in telecommunications and digital storytelling from Ball State University.

== Career ==
Harris worked as a programming producer for Fox Sports Midwest and PBS. He was also the president of the Educational Television Cooperative before founding Motivation Media, a company that produces marketing and communication materials. Harris was elected to the Indiana House of Representatives in November 2016. He also serves as assistant Democratic floor leader and vice chair of the Indiana Black Legislative Caucus.
