= Donna Harris (politician) =

American politician

Member of the Indiana House of Representatives from the 2nd district
- In office April 18, 2015 – November 9, 2016
- Preceded by: Earl Harris
- Succeeded by: Earl Harris Jr.

Personal details
- Born: Chicago, Illinois, U.S.
- Party: Democratic
- Spouse: Earl Harris (m. 1969; died 2015)
- Relations: Earl Harris Jr. (son)

Donna Harris is an American politician who served as a member of the Indiana House of Representatives for the 2nd district from 2015 to 2016.

== Early life and education ==
Harris was born in Chicago and raised in East Chicago, Indiana. She graduated from Washington High School.

== Political career ==
Harris was the president of the Indiana State Assembly Club. She was appointed to the Indiana House of Representatives on April 18, 2015, to replace her husband, Earl Harris, who had died in office. She did not run for re-election in 2016 and was succeeded by her son, Earl Harris Jr.
