= Joseph B. Adkison =

United States Army Medal of Honor recipient

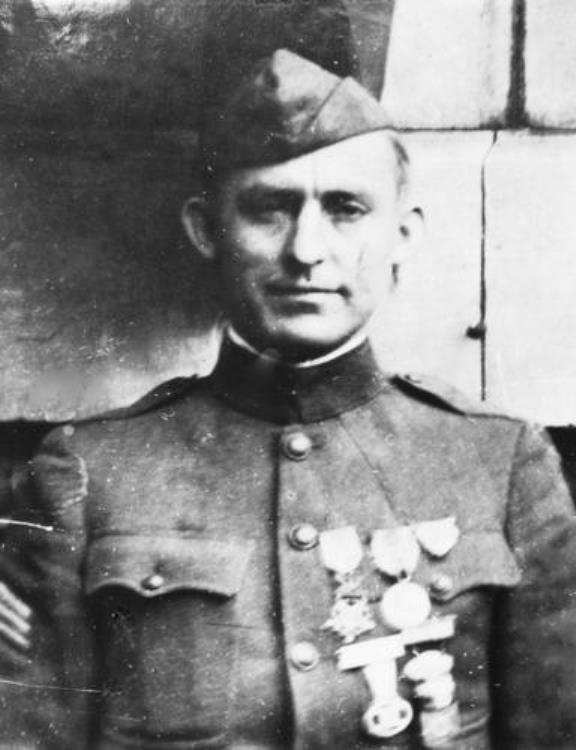
- Medal of Honor recipient
- Born: January 4, 1892; Egypt, Tipton County, Tennessee, U.S.
- Died: May 23, 1965 (aged 73); Atoka, Tennessee, U.S.
- Burial place: Salem Cemetery, close to the Town of Atoka, Tennessee
- Military career
- Allegiance: United States of America
- Branch: United States Army
- Service years: 1917-1921
- Rank: Sergeant
- Service number: 1315019
- Unit: 119th Infantry Regiment
- Conflicts: World War I; Battle of St Quentin Canal
- Awards: Medal of Honor Silver Star Purple Heart

Joseph Bernard Adkison (January 4, 1892 – May 23, 1965) was an American soldier serving in the U.S. Army during World War I who received the Medal of Honor for bravery.

== Biography ==
Adkison was born in Egypt, Tennessee, and entered the Army in 1917 in Memphis. He lived in Atoka, Tennessee, when he entered the army. By mid-1918, Adkison and his division were involved in combat in France. On September 29, 1918, near Bellicourt, France, Adkison, by then a Sergeant, found himself and his platoon pinned down by heavy German machine gun fire located fifty yards to their front.

Adkison, acting alone, charged the machine gun nest, kicked it over into the enemy trench, and using the bayonet fixed on his rifle captured the three man machine gun crew, allowing his platoon to advance. He was awarded the Medal of Honor in 1919, and was one of six soldiers from Tennessee to receive that medal for their service during the First World War. Another of the six was Alvin York, subject of the film Sergeant York starring actor Gary Cooper.

Adkison received the Medal of Honor at the Atoka Presbyterian Church. The church had a stone monument made to honor the occasion. The Atoka Board of Mayor and Aldermen named a street in his honor. Adkison Circle passes in front of the property and home his mother bought in 1906. During Tennessee Homecoming '86, the stone from the church was moved to a newly named Adkison Park, also in front of his home in the Town of Atoka.

Adkison died in 1965, and is buried at Salem Cemetery next to the Salem Associate Reformed Presbyterian Church near the Town of Atoka, Tennessee.

== Medal of Honor citation ==
Rank and organization: Sergeant, U.S. Army, Company C, 119th Infantry, 30th Division. Place and date: At Bellicourt, France; September 29, 1918. Entered service at: Memphis Tennessee. Born: January 4, 1892; Egypt, Tennessee. General Orders: War Department, General Orders No. 59 (May 3, 1919).

Citation:

When murderous machinegun fire at a range of 50 yards had made it impossible for his platoon to advance, and had caused the platoon to take cover Sergeant. Adkison alone, with the greatest intrepidity, rushed across the 50 yards of open ground directly into the face of the hostile machinegun kicked the gun from the parapet into the enemy trench, and at the point of the bayonet captured the 3 men manning the gun. The gallantry and quick decision of this soldier enabled the platoon to resume its advance.

== See also ==
- List of Medal of Honor recipients
- List of Medal of Honor recipients for World War I
