= Shelby Forest, Tennessee =

Unincorporated community in Tennessee

Coordinates: 35.280°N 90.054°W

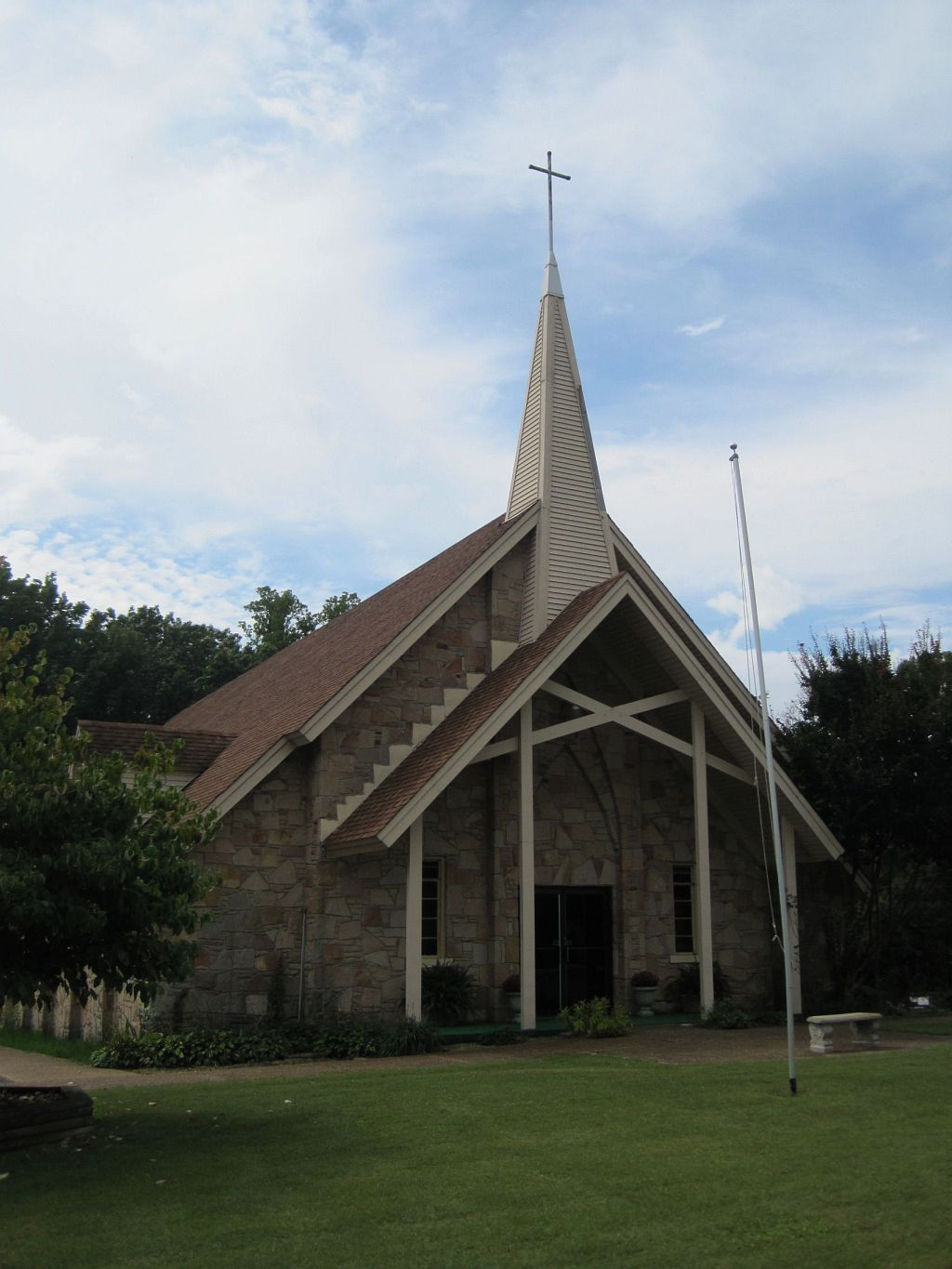
Shelby Forest Baptist Church in Shelby Forest, Tennessee

Shelby Forest is an unincorporated community in Shelby County, Tennessee, United States. The area is located roughly twelve miles north of Downtown Memphis, just west of the Millington area and eight miles (13 km) north of Frayser. The area includes the former communities of Benjestown, Locke, Cuba, and Woodstock each previously maintaining their own post office.

== Education ==
The Shelby Forest community is serviced by Shelby County Schools, including Millington Central High School. Millington Central High School is operated by the Millington Municipal School District.

== Recreation ==
Meeman-Shelby Forest State Park is adjacent to the community and provides many activities. Meeman-Shelby Forest State Park covers 13,467 acres (54.50 km^{2}) and is the most visited state park in Tennessee. It also meets up with the Mississippi River, and has a boat ramp.

== Notable people ==
- Justin Timberlake grew up in the Shelby Forest community.
- Al Green also resides here.
