= Millington Municipal Schools =

School district in Tennessee, United States

Address
- 5020 Second Ave Millington, Shelby County, Tennessee, 38053; United States

District information
- Grades: Pre-K–12
- Schools: 3 (2023–24)
- NCES District ID: 4700150

Students and staff
- Students: 2,646 (2023–24)
- Teachers: 166 (FTE) (2023–24)
- Student–teacher ratio: 15.94 (2023–24)

Millington Municipal Schools (MMS) is a public school district serving Millington, Tennessee within the Memphis metropolitan area, United States. It was formed in 2013.

The district's schools are Millington Early Learning Academy, Millington Primary School, Millington Intermediate School and Millington Central Middle High School.

In addition to serving the city of Millington, it also serves the Millington Annexation Reserve, which is a large-divided unincorporated area within Shelby County.
