= Egypt, Tennessee =

Egypt
- Coordinates: 35.2428656°N 89.9253652°W
- Country: United States
- State: Tennessee
- County: Shelby
- Elevation: 299 ft (91 m)

Egypt is an American populated place in Shelby County, Tennessee at 35.2428656°N 89.9253652°W. Its elevation is 299 feet (91 m). Joseph B. Adkison, a recipient of the Medal of Honor for his actions in World War I, was from Egypt.
