= Meeman-Shelby Forest State Park =

State park in Tennessee, United States

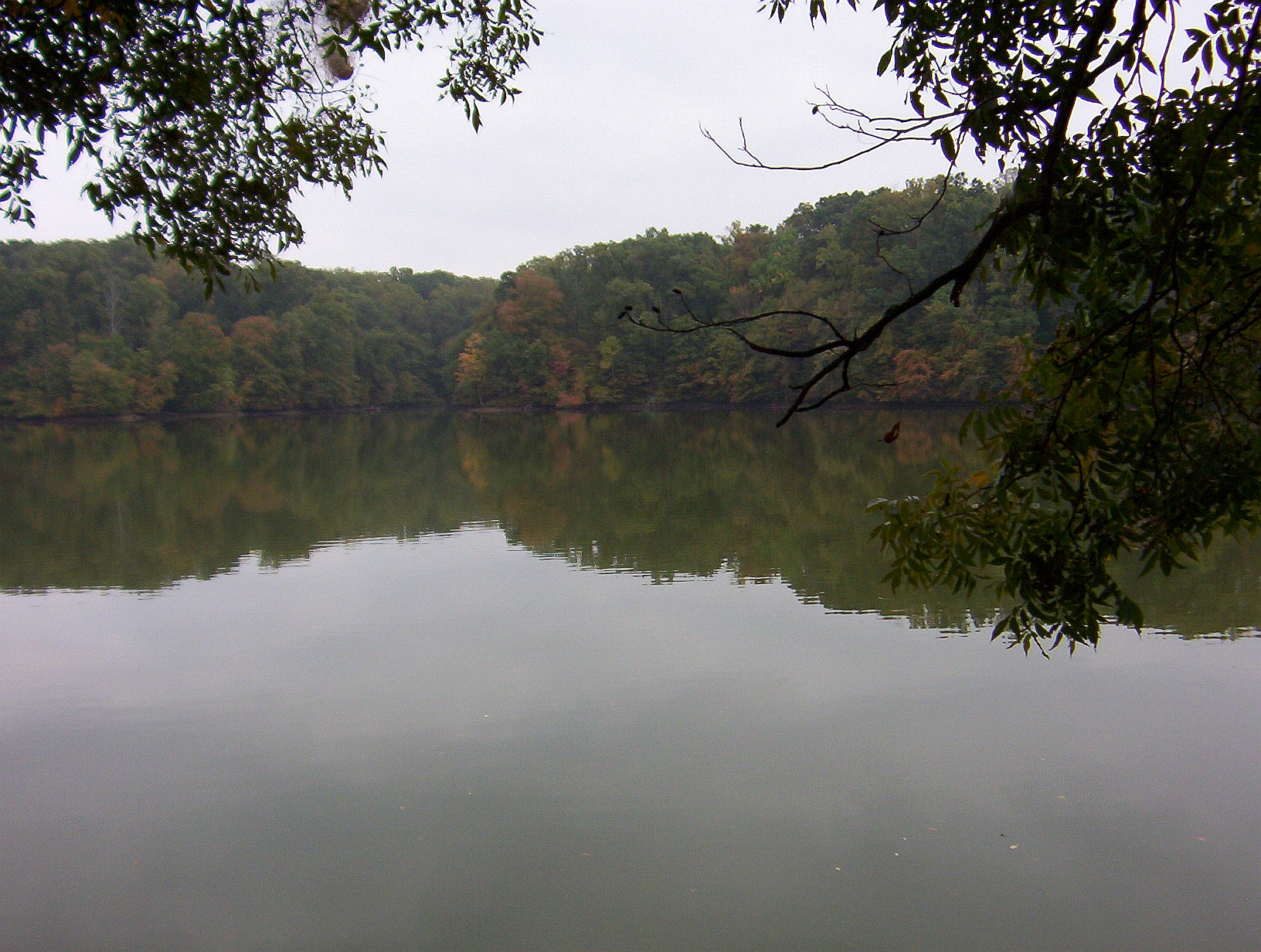
- Scenic view onto a lake in Meeman Shelby State Park
- Interactive map of Meeman-Shelby Forest State Park
- Type: Tennessee State Park
- Location: Millington, Tennessee
- Coordinates: 35°20′38″N 90°01′58″W
- Operator: TDEC
- Website: Meeman-Shelby Forest State Park

Meeman-Shelby Forest State Park is a state park in Shelby County, Tennessee near Memphis, located in the southeastern United States. The park borders the Mississippi River and contains two lakes: Poplar Tree Lake and Lake Piersol. The Meeman Museum and Nature Center—named for conservationist and journalist Edward J. Meeman, the former editor of the Memphis Press-Scimitar—is located in the park's grounds. The park covers 12,539 acres (50.74 km^{2}) and is the most visited state park in Tennessee.

The unincorporated community Shelby Forest is adjacent to the park.

== Attractions and activities available ==
- Biking trails
- Boating
- Cabins
- Camping
- Disc golf course
- Fishing
- Group camping
- Hiking trails
- Meeman Museum and Nature Center
- Picnic facilities
