= Millington, Tennessee =

City in Tennessee, United States

- City
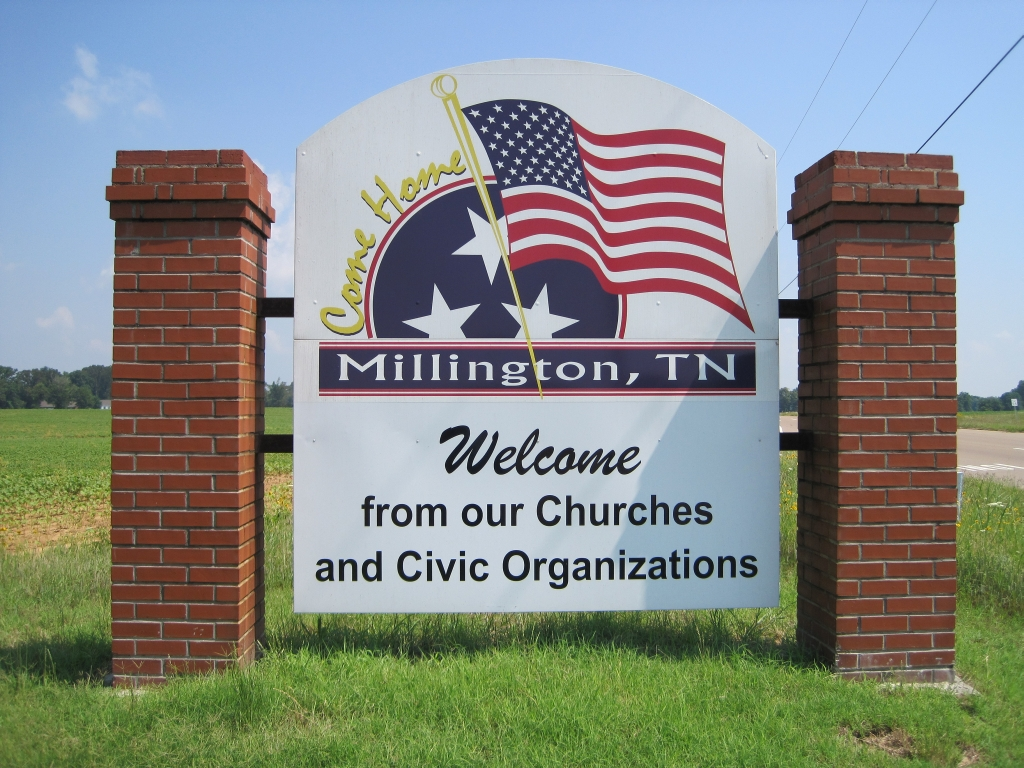
- Millington's welcome sign at Singleton Parkway

- Flag

- Location of Millington in Shelby County, Tennessee.
- Coordinates: 35°20′12″N 89°54′8″W
- Country: United States
- State: Tennessee
- County: Shelby

Government
  - Type: Local
  - Mayor: Larry Dagen

Area
  - Total: 22.42 sq mi (58.07 km^{2})
  - Land: 22.41 sq mi (58.03 km^{2})
  - Water: 0.015 sq mi (0.04 km^{2})
- Elevation: 260 ft (80 m)

Population (2020)
  - Total: 10,582
  - Density: 472.3/sq mi (182.36/km^{2})
- Time zone: UTC−6 (Central (CST))
  - Summer (DST): UTC−5 (CDT)
- ZIP Codes: 38053
- Area code: 901
- FIPS code: 47-49060
- GNIS feature ID: 1293985
- Website: www.millingtontn.gov

Millington is a city in Shelby County, Tennessee, United States, and is a part of the Memphis metropolitan area. As of the 2020 census, Millington had a population of 10,582. Millington was granted the title "Flag City Tennessee" by the Tennessee State Legislature. The Naval Support Activity Mid-South is located at the former Memphis Naval Air Station, whose function was changed in 1993 from a training base to an administrative one. There is also a general aviation airport that features the third longest runway in Tennessee.

== Geography ==
Millington is at 35°20′12″N 89°54′8″W (35.336566, -89.902132).

According to the United States Census Bureau, the city has a total area of 15.6 square miles (40 km^{2}), of which 0.04 square miles (0.10 km^{2}), or 0.13%, is water.

The city is located in the Memphis Metropolitan Area, about 9 miles (14 km) north of Memphis. The metropolitan area of Memphis has a population of approximately 1.2 million people. Millington is close to the Meeman-Shelby Forest State Park, Fort Pillow State Park, and the Mississippi River.

== History ==
The book Millington, the First Hundred Years by Faye Ellis Osteen (compiled of many stories that can not be proven fact or fiction, relies on individual witnesses and stories handed down by local families) and published by the Millington Centennial Committee outlines the history of Millington from its beginnings to the present. In 1878, Mr. and Mrs. George Millington donated a large area of land to a group of settlers for the purpose of starting a town.Mr. Millington requbhested that the new town be named in his honor. In 1888, the First Baptist Church was founded.It has over 5000 members. Its church is one of the largest buildings in Millington. In 1890, the first industry came to town. Since that time, job growth has been sporadic and unfocused. Millington was officially chartered by the State of Tennessee in 1903. In 1917 the US military began its initial presence in Millington. Park Field was established as a pilot training facility. With the conclusion of World War I in 1918, military pilot training ceased. It was not until 1942, with the outbreak of World War II that the military would renew its interest in Millington. In 1928 Millington Telephone was established.This business brought modern communications to Millington and the surrounding region. At the outset of World War II the US Navy established the current airport as a training facility for Navy pilots. Consistently for many decades over 15,000 military personnel were assigned to Millington. The Navy brought prosperity to the community on an ongoing basis. In 1993 the Base Realignment and Closure Commission directed the realignment of NAS Memphis which began the process of downsizing the Millington Navy facility. Flight training was moved out of Millington. However, all US Navy personnel functions were relocated to the community. At present the military and associated private contracting creates a $335 million annual economic benefit to the region. In 1986 USA Stadium was developed by Mr. W. S. "Babe" Howard. This sporting facility brought recognition to Millington. International baseball was played here. The Stadium continues to be an economic asset for the community. In 1993 the Millington Regional Jetport was opened as a general aviation airport. It currently is the backup airport for Federal Express(FedEx). ==History== The book Millington, the First Hundred Years by Faye Ellis Osteen (compiled of many stories that can not be proven fact or fiction, relies on individual witnesses and stories handed down by local families) and published by the Millington Centennial Committee outlines the history of Millington from its beginnings to the present. In 1878, Mr. and Mrs. George Millington donated a large area of land to a group of settlers for the purpose of starting a town.Mr. Millington requbhested that the new town be named in his honor. In 1888, the First Baptist Church was founded.It has over 5000 members. Its church is one of the largest buildings in Millington. In 1890, the first industry came to town. Since that time, job growth has been sporadic and unfocused. Millington was officially chartered by the State of Tennessee in 1903. In 1917 the US military began its initial presence in Millington. Park Field was established as a pilot training facility. With the conclusion of World War I in 1918, military pilot training ceased. It was not until 1942, with the outbreak of World War II that the military would renew its interest in Millington. In 1928 Millington Telephone was established.This business brought modern communications to Millington and the surrounding region. At the outset of World War II the US Navy established the current airport as a training facility for Navy pilots. Consistently for many decades over 15,000 military personnel were assigned to Millington. The Navy brought prosperity to the community on an ongoing basis. In 1993 the Base Realignment and Closure Commission directed the realignment of NAS Memphis which began the process of downsizing the Millington Navy facility. Flight training was moved out of Millington. However, all US Navy personnel functions were relocated to the community. At present the military and associated private contracting creates a $335 million annual economic benefit to the region. In 1986 USA Stadium was developed by Mr. W. S. "Babe" Howard. This sporting facility brought recognition to Millington. International baseball was played here. The Stadium continues to be an economic asset for the community. In 1993 the Millington Regional Jetport was opened as a general aviation airport. It currently is the backup airport for Federal Express(FedEx).

== History ==
The book Millington, the First Hundred Years by Faye Ellis Osteen (compiled of many stories that can not be proven fact or fiction, relies on individual witnesses and stories handed down by local families) and published by the Millington Centennial Committee outlines the history of Millington from its beginnings to the present. In 1878, Mr. and Mrs. George Millington donated a large area of land to a group of settlers for the purpose of starting a town.Mr. Millington requbhested that the new town be named in his honor. In 1888, the First Baptist Church was founded.It has over 5000 members. Its church is one of the largest buildings in Millington. In 1890, the first industry came to town. Since that time, job growth has been sporadic and unfocused. Millington was officially chartered by the State of Tennessee in 1903. In 1917 the US military began its initial presence in Millington. Park Field was established as a pilot training facility. With the conclusion of World War I in 1918, military pilot training ceased. It was not until 1942, with the outbreak of World War II that the military would renew its interest in Millington. In 1928 Millington Telephone was established.This business brought modern communications to Millington and the surrounding region. At the outset of World War II the US Navy established the current airport as a training facility for Navy pilots. Consistently for many decades over 15,000 military personnel were assigned to Millington. The Navy brought prosperity to the community on an ongoing basis. In 1993 the Base Realignment and Closure Commission directed the realignment of NAS Memphis which began the process of downsizing the Millington Navy facility. Flight training was moved out of Millington. However, all US Navy personnel functions were relocated to the community. At present the military and associated private contracting creates a $335 million annual economic benefit to the region. In 1986 USA Stadium was developed by Mr. W. S. "Babe" Howard. This sporting facility brought recognition to Millington. International baseball was played here. The Stadium continues to be an economic asset for the community. In 1993 the Millington Regional Jetport was opened as a general aviation airport. It currently is the backup airport for Federal Express(FedEx).

== Demographics ==
Historical population
Census	Pop.	Note	%±
1910	554		—
1920	657		18.6%
1930	662		0.8%
1940	730		10.3%
1950	4,696		543.3%
1960	6,059		29.0%
1970	21,177		249.5%
1980	20,236		−4.4%
1990	17,866		−11.7%
2000	10,433		−41.6%
2010	10,176		−2.5%
2020	10,582		4.0%
2025 (est.)	12,953	▲	22.4%
U.S. Decennial Census

=== 2020 census ===
As of the 2020 census, Millington had a population of 10,582. The median age was 39.5 years, 21.2% of residents were under the age of 18, and 18.1% of residents were 65 years of age or older. For every 100 females there were 88.5 males, and for every 100 females age 18 and over there were 88.2 males age 18 and over.

Racial composition as of the 2020 census
Race	Number	Percent
White	6,288	59.4%
Black or African American	2,852	27.0%
American Indian and Alaska Native	36	0.3%
Asian	240	2.3%
Native Hawaiian and Other Pacific Islander	11	0.1%
Some other race	324	3.1%
Two or more races	831	7.9%
Hispanic or Latino (of any race)	672	6.4%

90.6% of residents lived in urban areas, while 9.4% lived in rural areas.

There were 4,352 households in Millington, of which 29.4% had children under the age of 18 living in them. Of all households, 39.7% were married-couple households, 21.0% were households with a male householder and no spouse or partner present, and 33.3% were households with a female householder and no spouse or partner present. About 31.6% of all households were made up of individuals and 12.5% had someone living alone who was 65 years of age or older.

There were 4,704 housing units, of which 7.5% were vacant. The homeowner vacancy rate was 1.3% and the rental vacancy rate was 7.0%.

=== 2010 census ===
As of the census of 2010, there was a population of 10,176, with 3,814 households and 2,699 families residing in the city. The population density was 321.7 inhabitants per square mile (124.2/km^{2}). There were 4,408 housing units at an average housing density of 258.2 per square mile (99.7/^{2}). The racial makeup of the city was 65.2% White, 25.6% African American, 0.6% Native American, 2.4% Asian, 0.2% Pacific Islander, and 2.35% from two or more races. Hispanic or Latino of any race were 5.9% of the population.

The average household size is 2.5 persons.

Age breakdowns are as follows: 6.8% under the age of 5, 24.2% under the age of 18 and 14.8% who were 65 years of age or older. There was 51.9% of the population that was female.

The median income for a household in the city was $43,779. The per capita income for the city was $22,696. About 13% of the population were below the poverty line.

== Naval Support Activity Mid-South ==
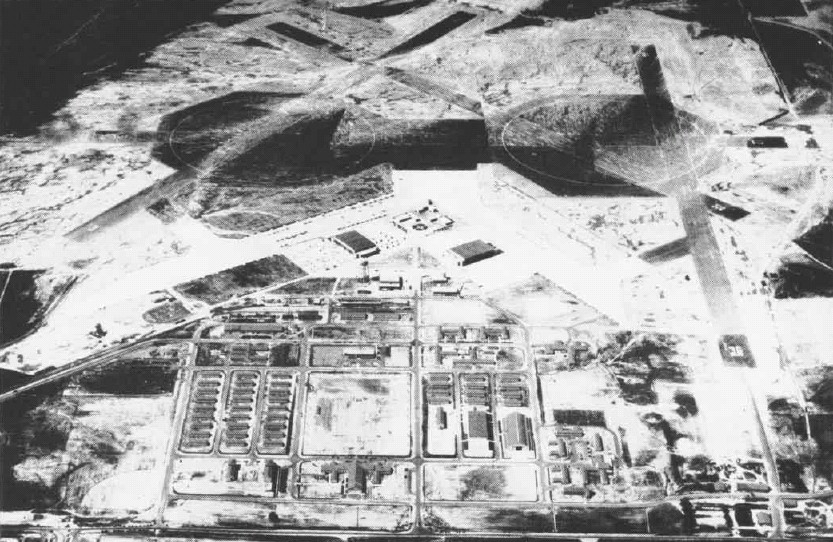
Aerial view of the Naval Air Station Memphis in the mid-1940s

Millington is home to the Naval Support Activity Mid-South (NAVSUPPACT) naval station, one of the largest single employers in the state of Tennessee, with more than 7,500 military, civilian, and contractor employees on 1,950 acres (7.9 km^{2}). The naval base hosts many tenant organizations, notably the Bureau of Naval Personnel (BUPERS). Formerly known as the Naval Air Station (NAS) Memphis, a major technical training center for the United States Navy and Marine Corps comprising over 3,800 acres (15 km^{2}), the 1993 Base Realignment and Closure Commission report resulted in significant changes to the base's mission and its re-designation in 1995 as the Naval Support Activity Memphis. The airfield, which is now the Millington Regional Jetport, was turned over to the city of Millington. In 1998, the name of the naval station was changed to Naval Support Activity Mid-South to better reflect its current mission and the Navy's approach to regionalization. Many military retirees, who live in and around Millington in order to have access to base facilities, contribute to the local economy.

This site was originally established in November 1917 as Park Field, an Army Signal Corps Aviation School used to train pilots for service with the Allied Forces during World War I. By February 1918, flight operations were in full swing, but only until November of that year when the Armistice was signed. Two days after the signing, training operations were ceased.

At that time the airfield began pioneering airmail routes throughout Tennessee and the surrounding states. In March 1920, the government officially purchased Park Field. However, the airfield continued to decline until it was little more than a storage area for aircraft and parts.

Ironically, the Stock Market Crash of 1929 breathed new life into Park Field. During the 1930s the field served as a transient camp for unemployed workers. In 1937 the Resettlement Administration took over the land and developed model farms used to demonstrate what could be achieved with correctly managed land. Park Field remained under this agency's jurisdiction until the outbreak of World War II.

Just as the onset of World War I had given Park Field its birth in 1917, the declaration of war on December 8, 1941, had similar results, heralding the arrival of naval aviation to the Memphis area. In February 1942, the Navy Shore Station Development Board recommended approval of a reserve aviation base on the former site of Park Field.

The Naval Training Station was commissioned along with the Naval Reserve Aviation Base in 1942. On January 1, 1943, the name was changed from Naval Reserve Aviation Base to Naval Air Station Memphis. The main role of Naval Air Station Memphis was to provide aviation maintenance and pilot training. During this period of time more than 20,000 students were trained annually. Pilot training for Student Naval Aviators was discontinued after World War II, but NAS Memphis continued to thrive as home of Naval Air Technical Training Center Memphis (NATTC Memphis), providing initial and advanced technical training to various aviation operations, aviation maintenance and aviation support specialities coded under Navy enlisted aviation ratings and Marine Corps enlisted aviation Military Occupational Specialities. Training activities by these "A" Schools and "C" Schools at NATTC Memphis continued until 1993 when BRAC (Base Realignment and Closure Commission) recommended that the training schools under NATTC transfer to NAS Pensacola, Florida and occupy spaces being vacated by the former Naval Aviation Depot Pensacola (NADEP Pensacola) that was also being closed by BRAC action. During the same time period BRAC also recommended that BUPERS (Bureau of Naval Personnel) move from Virginia to Millington.

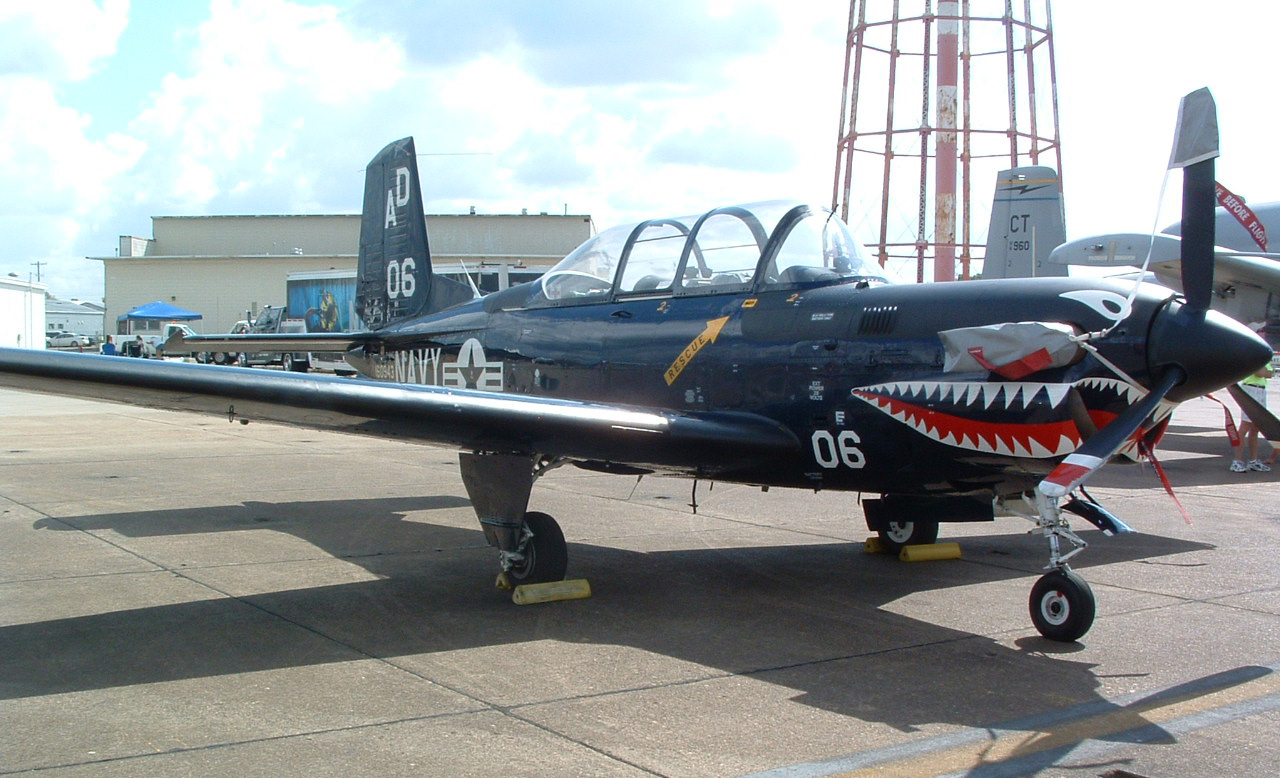
Plane at Midsouth Air Show, NSA Mid-South in 2007

Annual events

- Flag City Freedom Celebration
  - Draws more than 30,000 visitors to the city
  - July 4
  - USA Stadium
- Air show
  - Sponsored by Mid-South Airshow Foundation
  - 1999 to 2007
  - was held every two years
  - US Blue Angels

== Local government ==
Millington is chartered by the State of Tennessee under a City Manager form of government. This city has a mayor and seven aldermen, each of whom each serves a four-year term. The current mayor is Larry Dagen, and the aldermen, are Bethany Huffman, Al Bell, Chris Ford, John Perales, Thomas McGhee, Don Lowry and Gavin Smith. The current City manager is Frankie Dakin. The current Public Safety Director is Gary Graves.

== Education ==
The city is served by Millington Municipal Schools and Shelby County Schools. Millington Primary School, Millington Intermediate School, and Millington Central Middle High School are in the Millington Municipal School District. Lucy Elementary, Woodstock Middle School, and E.E Jeter School operates in the Shelby County Schools.

Prior to the establishment of the municipal school district, Millington was mostly a part of the Shelby County Board of Education.

== Culture ==
=== Sports ===
USA Stadium was the home for USA Baseball from 1986 to 1996. Since then it has hosted numerous other events at the stadium, including 171 International Games, 18 Service Academy Spring Classics, eight Gulf South Conference Baseball Championships, 17 USA Classic National High School Tournaments, 16 NJCAA Division I World Series, 11 USA Teams, four TSSAA High School State Championships, and 18 foreign countries: Argentina, Aruba, Canada, China, Cuba, Italy, Japan, Korea, Mexico, Mongolia, New Zealand, Nicaragua, Peru, Puerto Rico, Taiwan, USSR (Russia), and Venezuela.

=== Recreation ===
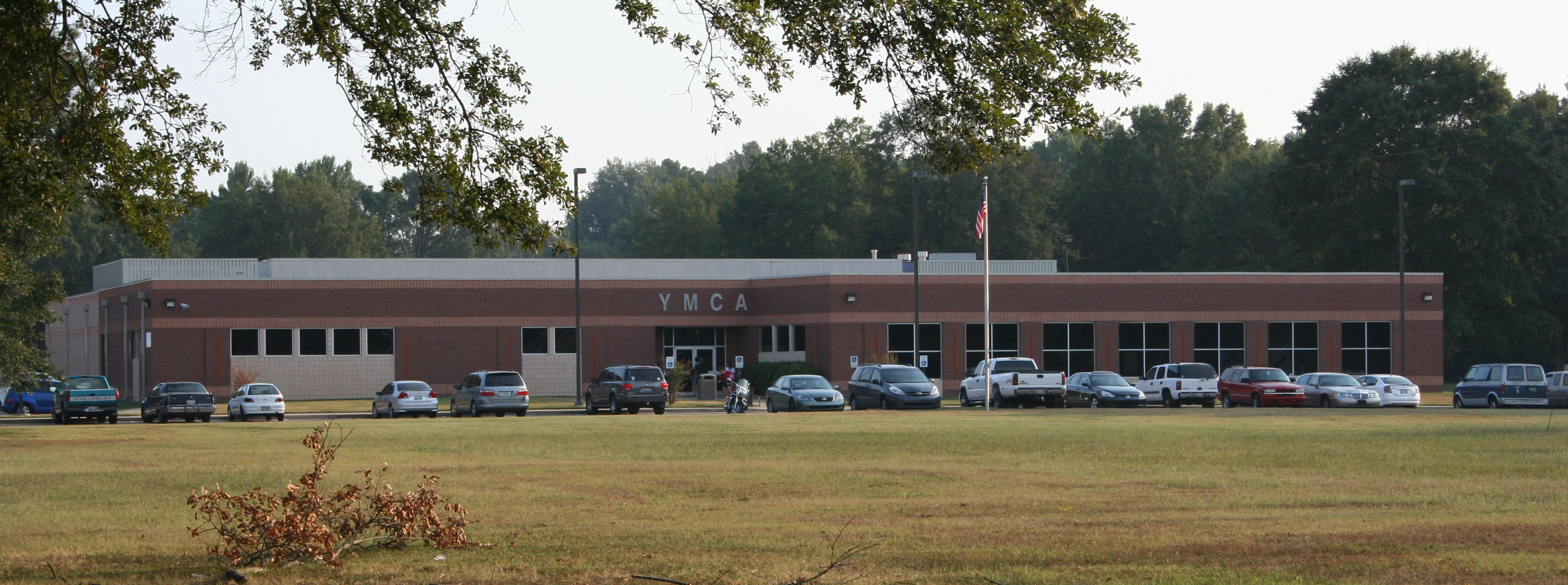
Millington Family YMCA

The Millington Family YMCA is notable for its 25-yard, eight-lane indoor pool and outdoor water park.

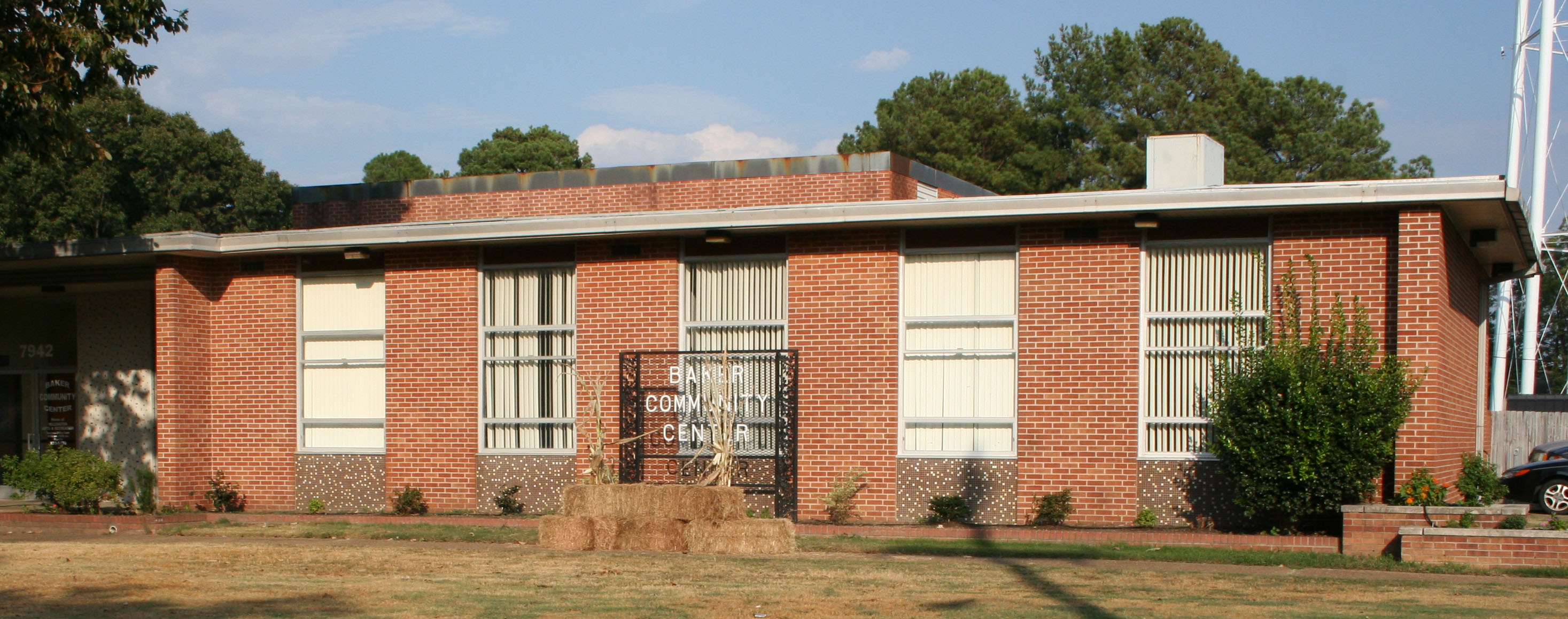
Baker Community Center

The Baker Community Center is located at 7942 Church Street. It was built in 1960, and contains a curtained stage, large auditorium, five meeting rooms, and a fully equipped kitchen.

Millington golf courses include Glen Eagle Golf Course, Edmund Orgill Park Golf Course, and the Mirimichi Golf Course, the last of which was owned by Justin Timberlake.

Oak Park, Miles Park, Lions Park, and Aycock Park are all parks found in Millington. Oak Park is located at 7930 Church Street and sits on .32 mi (0.51 km). Miles Park is located at 4724 Biloxi Street and sits on .45 mi (0.72 km). Lions Park is located at Hickory Meadow Road and sits on .86 miles (1.38 km). Aycock Park is located at 7330 Renda Street and sits on 22 acres (89,000 m^{2}).

=== Local festivals ===
Goat Days is an annual Millington event. This September event takes place at the USA Stadium grounds. It includes many local home town events such as tractor pulls, an ice cream making, and a goat chariot race. Goat Days does not have a specific date of origin recorded, but the event was founded by William S. "Babe" Howard, the first president of the Millington Chamber of Commerce. The event is community supported and is administered by many volunteers.

=== Media ===
The Millington Star is the local community newspaper. Founded in 1951, it is published once a week, and currently has a circulation of about 20,000. The paper's office is located on Easley Street. It is owned by West 10 Media, LLC.

== Transportation ==
The completion of Veterans Parkway has resulted in a major multi lane roadway linking US Highway 51 to Interstate 269, formerly part of Tennessee Highway 385. The Canadian National Railroad serves many industrial properties.

The city is served by Millington Regional Jetport, which has the third largest runway in the State of Tennessee. The airport has a full-time fire and rescue facility on its grounds, an instrument landing system, full-time control tower, and Automated Weather Observation System.

== Disasters ==
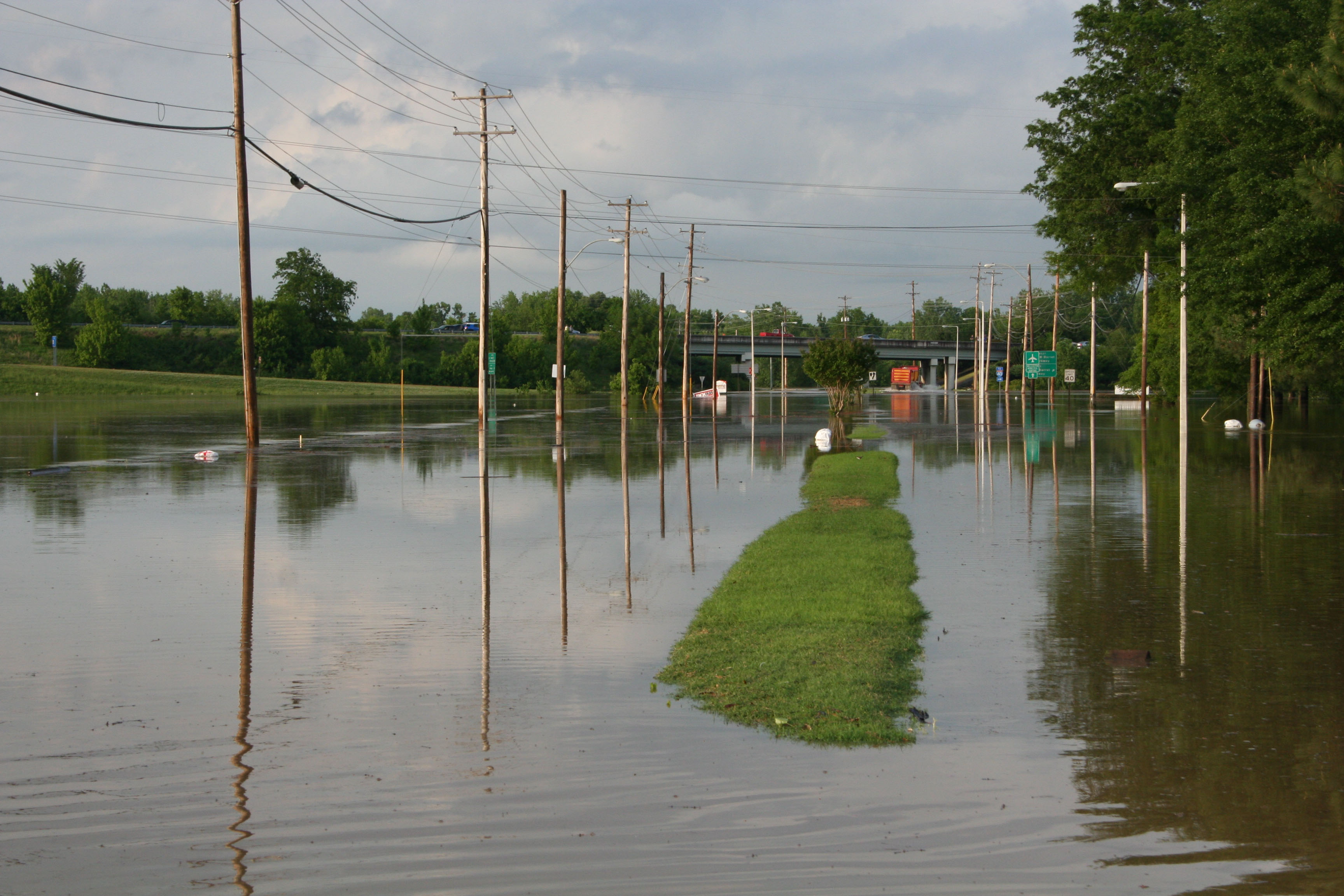
Raleigh Millington Road flooding 2010

On December 25, 1987, Millington experienced a flood of a 4.1 magnitude. The flood did not recede until December 29. It killed three people and displaced over 6,000 residents resulting in the construction of the current levee system.

On May 1 and 2, 2010, a similar flood took place, causing a massive displacement to residents in the Shady Oaks Mobile Home Community and other parts of Millington. Throughout the city, an estimated 1,500 people were evacuated from their homes when a nearby levee broke, causing a record-setting flood. One hundred forty six of those people were residents of the Millington Navy Base. Shelters for displaced residents were set up at the Baker Community Center and the United Methodist church. No injuries or fatalities were reported. The National Weather Service in Memphis estimated 10.00 inches (254 mm) of rain over the two-day period for Millington.
