= National Register of Historic Places listings in Fayette County, Tennessee =

Location of Fayette County in Tennessee

This is a list of the National Register of Historic Places listings in Fayette County, Tennessee.

This is intended to be a complete list of the properties and districts on the National Register of Historic Places in Fayette County, Tennessee, United States. Latitude and longitude coordinates are provided for many National Register properties and districts; these locations may be seen together in a map.

There are 14 properties and districts listed on the National Register in the county.

Contents: Counties in Tennessee
Anderson – Bedford – Benton – Bledsoe – Blount – Bradley – Campbell – Cannon – Carroll – Carter – Cheatham – Chester – Claiborne – Clay – Cocke – Coffee – Crockett – Cumberland – Davidson – Decatur – DeKalb – Dickson – Dyer – Fayette – Fentress – Franklin – Gibson – Giles – Grainger – Greene – Grundy – Hamblen – Hamilton – Hancock – Hardeman – Hardin – Hawkins – Haywood – Henderson – Henry – Hickman – Houston – Humphreys – Jackson – Jefferson – Johnson – Knox – Lake – Lauderdale – Lawrence – Lewis – Lincoln – Loudon – Macon – Madison – Marion – Marshall – Maury – McMinn – McNairy – Meigs – Monroe – Montgomery – Moore – Morgan – Obion – Overton – Perry – Pickett – Polk – Putnam – Rhea – Roane – Robertson – Rutherford – Scott – Sequatchie – Sevier – Shelby – Smith – Stewart – Sullivan – Sumner – Tipton – Trousdale – Unicoi – Union – Van Buren – Warren – Washington – Wayne – Weakley – White – Williamson – Wilson

This National Park Service list is complete through NPS recent listings posted April 17, 2026.

== Current listings ==
	Name on the Register	Image	Date listed	Location	City or town	Description
1	Bolivar-Somerville Stage Road		August 7, 2005 (#05000802)	Herron Dr., Stewart Rd., 4.0 miles southwest of Whiteville; 35°15′02″N 89°11′13″W	Whiteville	Extends into Hardeman County
2	Crawford General Store	Crawford General Store	July 8, 1975 (#75001752)	15360 TN-193; 35°09′30″N 89°22′28″W	Williston	
3	Crawford's Experiment Farm	Crawford's Experiment Farm	March 14, 1991 (#91000247)	6275 Evergreen Rd. 35°09′40″N 89°22′24″W	Williston	
4	Immanuel Church	Immanuel Church	April 14, 1972 (#72001239)	2nd and Chestnut Sts. 35°02′38″N 89°14′31″W	La Grange	
5	La Grange Historic District	La Grange Historic District	April 4, 1975 (#75001751)	Bounded by the La Grange town boundaries and including both sides of State Route 57 east to its junction with State Route 18; 35°02′01″N 89°14′19″W	La Grange	
6	Lucerne		December 23, 1977 (#77001269)	20 miles south of Brownsville on State Route 76; 35°20′48″N 89°20′30″W	Brownsville	
7	McFerren's Grocery and Oil Company		April 17, 2026 (#100012921)	7589 and 7615 TN-195; 35°13′14″N 89°20′59″W	Somerville vicinity	
8	Mebane-Nuckolls House		November 20, 1985 (#85002910)	Macon-Collierville Rd. 35°08′06″N 89°32′46″W	Macon	
9	Miller House	Miller House	December 8, 1978 (#78002587)	Raleigh-La Grange Rd. 35°06′33″N 89°34′36″W	Elba	
10	Oakland Presbyterian Church		March 20, 2002 (#02000235)	14780 State Route 194, S. 35°13′42″N 89°30′52″W	Oakland	
11	Petersburg Historic District	Petersburg Historic District	November 7, 1985 (#85002753)	Roughly bounded by Church, Railroad, Gaunt Sts., and State Route 50; 35°19′03″N 86°38′19″W	Petersburg	Extends into Lincoln County
12	Rossville Historic District	Rossville Historic District	July 19, 2001 (#01000726)	Roughly along Main, 2nd, and Front Sts. 35°02′52″N 89°32′35″W	Rossville	Historic downtown residences, churches, commercial buildings.
13	Somerville Historic District	Somerville Historic District	April 15, 1982 (#82003968)	Court Square, and irregular pattern along N. Main St. 35°14′25″N 89°20′58″W	Somerville	
14	Williston Historic District		December 14, 1995 (#95001409)	Roughly along Hotel and Railroad Sts. and Walker Ave. 35°09′39″N 89°22′22″W	Williston	

== See also ==
- List of National Historic Landmarks in Tennessee
- National Register of Historic Places listings in Tennessee
