= Daniel Dickinson =

Daniel Dickinson may refer to:

- Daniel D. Stevens (Daniel Dickinson Stevens, 1839–1916), United States Navy sailor and Medal of Honor recipient
- Daniel A. Dickinson (1839–1902), Minnesota Supreme Court justice
- Daniel S. Dickinson (1800–1866), New York politician
- Daniel Dickinson, a character in the television series Warehouse 13
- Daniel Dickinson (baseball) LSU and Milwaukee Brewers Second Baseman
