= Petersburg Historic District =

Petersburg Historic District may refer to:

- Petersburg Historic District (Petersburg, Illinois), listed on the National Register of Historic Places in Menard County, Illinois
- Petersburg Historic District (Petersburg, Tennessee), listed on the National Register of Historic Places in Fayette County, Tennessee
