= Advent Camp Meeting Grounds Historic District =

Historic district in Vermont, United States

- U.S. National Register of Historic Places
- U.S. Historic district
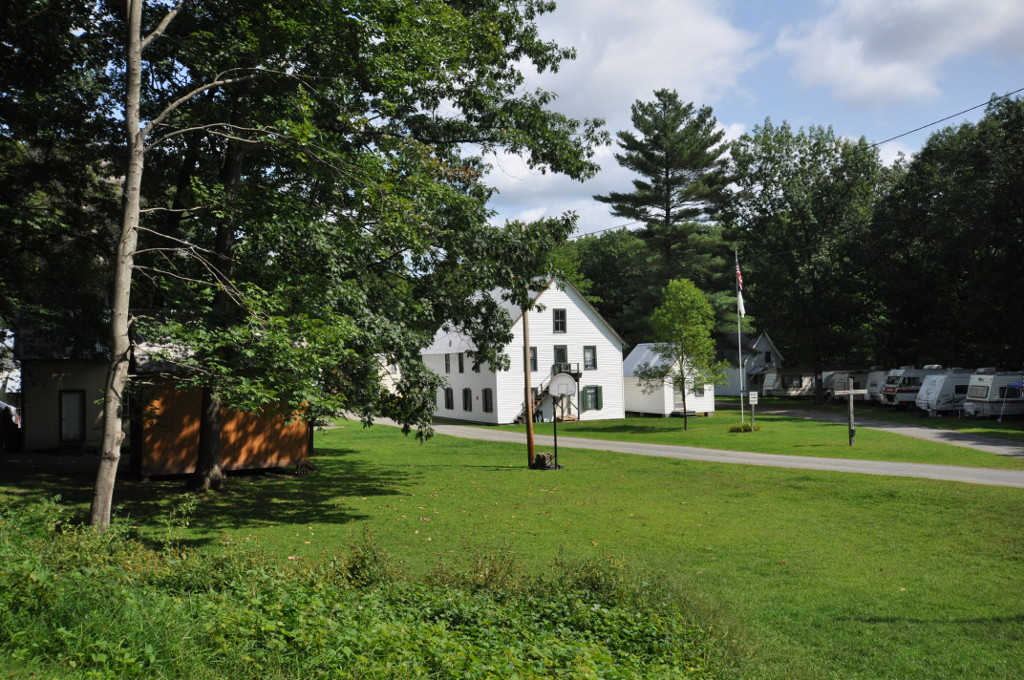

- Location within Vermont Location within the United States
- Location: 150 Advent Ln., Hartford, Vermont
- Coordinates: 43°39′40″N 72°18′42″W
- Area: 7.5 acres (3.0 ha)
- Built: 1887
- NRHP reference No.: 100001656
- Added to NRHP: September 21, 2017

The Advent Camp Meeting Ground Historic District encompasses the early surviving elements of a religious summer camp meeting ground in Hartford, Vermont. Founded in 1887, it is one of a small number of camp meetings surviving from the 19th century in the state, and the only surviving one run by the Advent Christian General Conference (not to be confused with the Seventh-day Adventist church, whose regional administrative conferences continue to hold annual camp meetings in over sixty locations in the United States alone). It was listed on the National Register of Historic Places in 2017.

== Description and history ==
The Advent Camp Meeting Ground is located in the town of Hartford, Vermont, on 7.5 acres (3.0 ha) of land between Mount Olivet Cemetery, and the tracks formerly of the Boston and Maine Railroad (B&M) that parallel the Connecticut River. Prior to its acquisition by the Advent Camp Meeting in 1887, it was part of the large landholdings of Orren Taft. It was not the first Adventist camp to be established in Vermont; one in Bethel was founded in 1868. That same year, the Adventist Christian Conference was organized, and also held a camp meeting in White River Junction. In 1886 members of the Bethel camp meeting split from that group, seeking to establish a permanent meeting ground near White River Junction. They acquired the land from Orren Taft in August 1887, and had a tabernacle tent and residence cabins built. The site's proximity to the B&M railroad line brought significant numbers of attendees over the next several decades, aided by the construction of a siding platform. A major fire in 1895 destroyed most of the early structures on the grounds, and resulted in the present-day wider spacing of buildings on the wooded grounds. The camp meeting's attendance declined beginning in the 1920s, but it has remained in continuous operation, with events every summer.

The buildings of the camp are organized around a central tabernacle, a single-story frame building with a shallow-pitch gabled roof. Its sides consist of removable wall sections covered with asphalt shingling, which are removed when the camp is in session to provide an open-air experience. Institutional buildings on the grounds include a kitchen/dining room, classroom buildings, and physical plant support. Residential buildings include two dormitories for group housing, and a large number of cabins. Some of the cabins are privately owned; all are of relatively modest proportions and styling.

== See also ==
- National Register of Historic Places listings in Windsor County, Vermont
