= Jericho Rural Historic District =

Historic district in Vermont, United States

- U.S. National Register of Historic Places
- U.S. Historic district
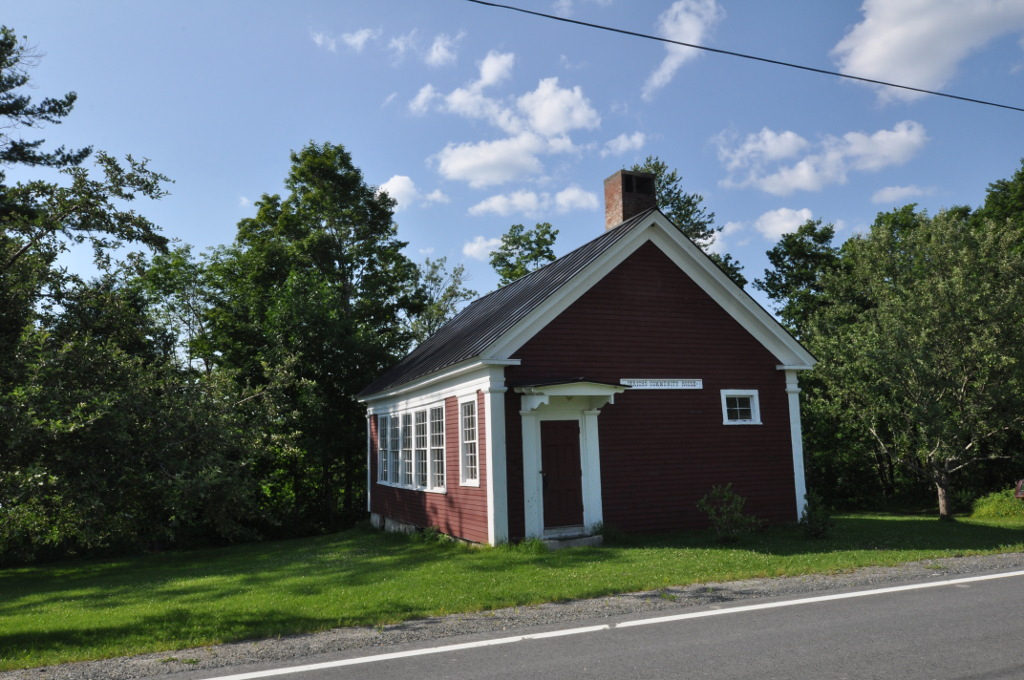
- The 1849 district schoolhouse

- Location within Vermont Location within the United States
- Location: Jericho St., Jericho Rd., Wallace Rd., Sugartop Rd., Joshua Rd., Hartford, Vermont
- Coordinates: 43°42′17″N 72°22′32″W
- Area: 774 acres (313 ha)
- Architectural style: Federal, Greek Revival, et al.
- NRHP reference No.: 01001228
- Added to NRHP: November 8, 2001

The Jericho Rural Historic District encompasses a rural agricultural landscape of northern Hartford, Vermont, extending slightly into neighboring Norwich. The area covers 774 acres (313 ha) of mainly agricultural and formerly agricultural lands, as well as associated woodlots, and includes nine historically significant farm complexes. It was listed on the National Register of Historic Places in 2001.

== Description and history ==
The Jericho Street area is a rural upland, roughly bounded on the south by the White River and the east by the flood plains of the Connecticut River. To the west it is roughly bounded by Jericho Brook, and the north by the east–west town line between Norwich and Hartford, except for one associated farm complex just over the line on Joshua Street. The area is served by roads whose routes were laid out in the late 19th century, when the area was first settled. Jericho Street runs north–south through the district, turning eastward near the northern end, with Wallace and Sugartop Roads running westward, and Jericho Road eastward. All but two of the historic farm complexes are found along Jericho Street; in addition to the one on Joshua, another is located on the west side of Sugartop, just south of the Norwich line. The distribution of wooded and open areas is relatively unchanged since about 1940.

The town of Hartford was first settled in the 1760s, with its early settlements along the Connecticut River. The Jericho Hill area was settled beginning in 1781, and the last of its historic farmsteads was built in 1841. All of the early farmsteads were simple Cape style houses, and were soon accompanied by agricultural outbuildings. The Jericho Hill area contains a remarkable set of contiguous historic farm properties, in which a relatively large number of outbuildings have survived, although not always in the best of condition. The district also includes a district schoolhouse, built in 1849, which still stands near the junction of Jericho Street and Jericho Road, and functions now as a local community center.

== See also ==
- National Register of Historic Places listings in Windsor County, Vermont
