= Progressive Market =

- U.S. National Register of Historic Places
- U.S. Historic district – Contributing property
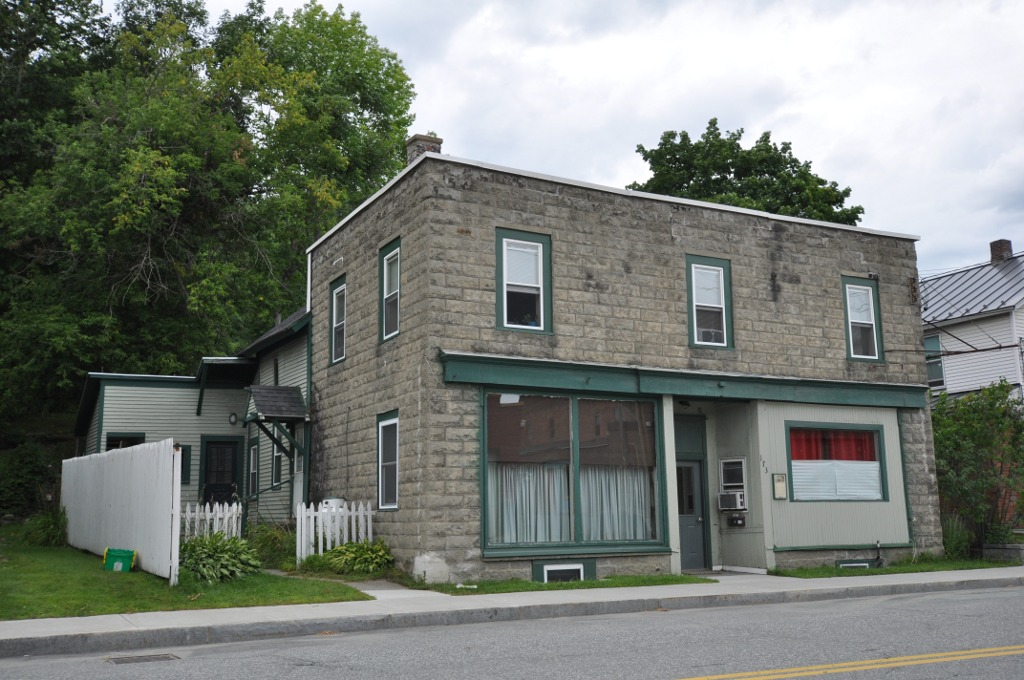

- Location within Vermont Location within the United States
- Location: 173 S. Main St., Hartford, Vermont
- Coordinates: 43°38′46″N 72°19′9″W
- Area: less than one acre
- Built: 1922
- Part of: White River Junction Historic District (2002 increase) (ID02001553)
- NRHP reference No.: 95000814

Significant dates
- Added to NRHP: July 10, 1995
- Designated CP: December 20, 2002

The Progressive Market is a historic commercial building at 173 South Main Street in White River Junction, Vermont. Built in 1922, it is an example of an increasingly rare type of building in Vermont, the neighborhood market. The store was operated for many years by Italian immigrants and Italian Americans, serving a local community in the area south of downtown White River Junction. The building, largely vernacular in form, was listed on the National Register of Historic Places in 1995. it appears to no longer house a retail establishment.

== Description and history ==
The former Progressive Market building is located just south of the main business district of White River Junction, on the west side of South Main Street. It is a multipart structure, consisting of a two-story front section built out of rusticated concrete blocks, a single story ell of similar construction, and at its rear an attached wood-frame structure that is older than the front sections. The front facade is set close to the sidewalk, and has a single storefront on the first floor, with a recessed entrance flanked by display windows. On the second floor there are three sash windows.

The first use of this property as a retail establishment was in 1922, when Giachino Romano purchased the property with a house standing on it. Either he or Raffaele and Virginia Guarino built the storefront, and it is the latter that operated a meat and grocery store on these premises until 1946, serving the predominantly Italian community stretched along South Main Street. The Falzarano family then operated the store at least into the 1990s. The proprietors generally lived above and behind the store.

== See also ==
- National Register of Historic Places listings in Windsor County, Vermont
