= Christian Street Rural Historic District =

Historic district in Vermont, United States

- U.S. National Register of Historic Places
- U.S. Historic district
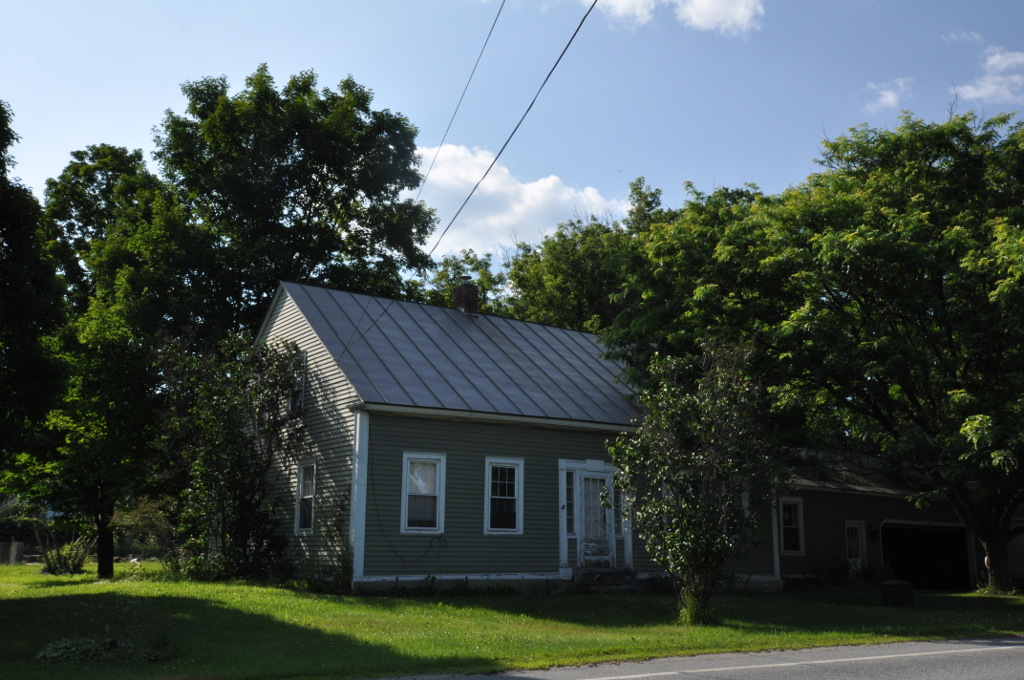

- Location within Vermont Location within the United States
- Location: Christian St., Hemlock Ridge Dr., and Jericho St., Hartford, Vermont
- Coordinates: 43°41′29″N 72°19′12″W
- Area: 198 acres (80 ha)
- Architectural style: Federal, Greek Revival, et al.
- NRHP reference No.: 03001248
- Added to NRHP: December 5, 2003

The Christian Street Rural Historic District encompasses the surviving elements of an early settlement village in the town of Hartford, Vermont. Centered on the junction of Christian Street (United States Route 5) and Jericho Street in northeastern Hartford, the area includes a modest number of 18th and 19th-century houses, as well as two farms that have been in the same families since the 18th century. The district was listed on the National Register of Historic Places in 2003.

== Description and history ==
The town of Hartford was chartered in 1761, with settlement beginning in 1763 near White River Junction. The area along the Connecticut River north of White River Junction was settled not long after, with members of Hazen family (originally from Woodbury, Connecticut) settling by 1770. Houses were built by the families that farmed the area along the stagecoach route, now Christian Street, signed US 5 in the area of the historic district. Ten houses, built between about 1775 and 1900, make up the principal elements of the district, along with the landscape of farmland running from Christian Street down to the river. The cemetery marking the southern end of the district was established about 1778.

The historic district is centered on the junction of Christian Street (US 5) and Jericho Street, which climbs the hill to the west. Its southern bound is the cemetery near the point where Christian Road and US 5 divide, and its northern boundary is roughly Hemlock Ridge Drive. All but one of the houses are located on Christian Road; one is on Jericho Street. There are two historic barns, one of which is a rare 18th-century structure. Most of the houses have associated outbuildings that are more modern. The houses are of generally moderate scale, 1-1/2 or 2-1/2 stories in height. Most are of wood frame construction and are finished in wooden clapboards; there is one brick house.

== See also ==
- National Register of Historic Places listings in Windsor County, Vermont
