= Hartford Library =

- U.S. National Register of Historic Places
- U.S. Historic district – Contributing property
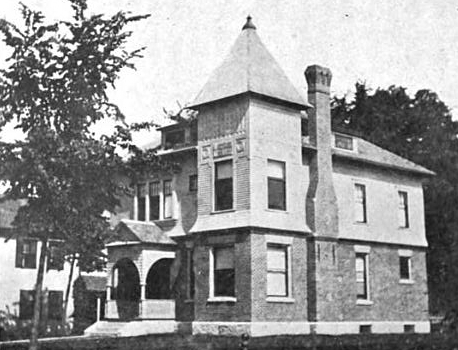
- Library building (c. 1897)

- Location within Vermont Location within the United States
- Location: 1587 Maple St., Hartford, Vermont
- Coordinates: 43°39′41″N 72°20′35″W
- Built: 1893
- Architect: Lyman Whipple
- Architectural style: Queen Anne; Colonial Revival
- Part of: Hartford Historic District (ID98001153)
- NRHP reference No.: 94001447

Significant dates
- Added to NRHP: December 9, 1994
- Designated CP: September 3, 1998

The Hartford Library is the public library serving the village of Hartford, Vermont. It is located at 1587 Maple Street, in an architecturally distinguished Queen Anne/Colonial Revival building constructed in 1893. The building was listed on the National Register of Historic Places in 1994.

== Architecture and history ==
The Hartford Library is located in the village of Hartford, on the north side of Maple Street (Vermont Route 14), a short way west of the White River bridge. It is a domestically scaled 2 1/2 story wood-frame building, with a hip roof and an exterior clad in wooden clapboards on the upper levels and in red brick veneer on the ground floor. The roof faces have low and wide shed-roof dormers, and a pyramidal square tower rises at the southwest corner. A flared series of wooden shingle courses separated the two floors. The front entrance is sheltered by a gabled portico with a round-arched front.

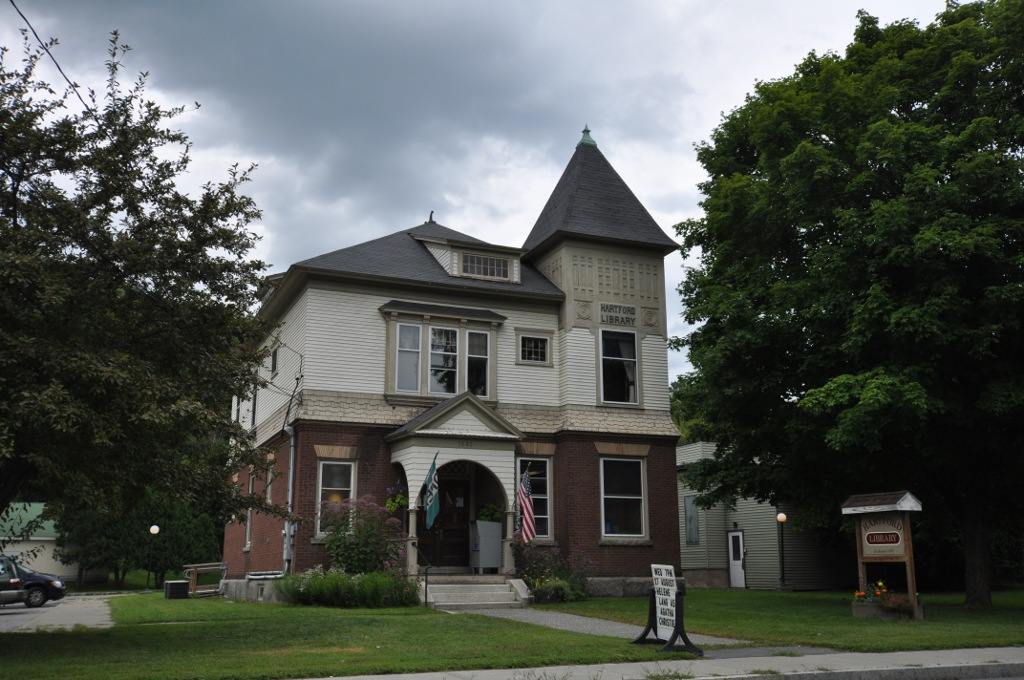
The library in 2014

The library was built in 1893 to a design by Lyman Whipple, and was the first of the town's five libraries. It is also one of the oldest dedicated library buildings in the state. It is one of the least-altered Late Victorian buildings in Hartford village, and has long been an anchor of community activities. The town's first library association was founded in 1883, and the present building was funded by a group of the town's leading businessmen, including Edward W. Morris, president of the Hartford Woolen Mill, and Ephraim Morris, who gave US$5,000 for its construction (equivalent to $172,768 in 2025).

== See also ==
- National Register of Historic Places listings in Windsor County, Vermont
