= Rossville Historic District =

Rossville Historic District can refer to either of the following sites listed on the United States National Register of Historic Places:

- Rossville Historic District (Hamilton, Ohio)
- Rossville Historic District (Rossville, Tennessee)
