= White River Junction Historic District =

Historic district in Vermont, United States

- U.S. National Register of Historic Places
- U.S. Historic district
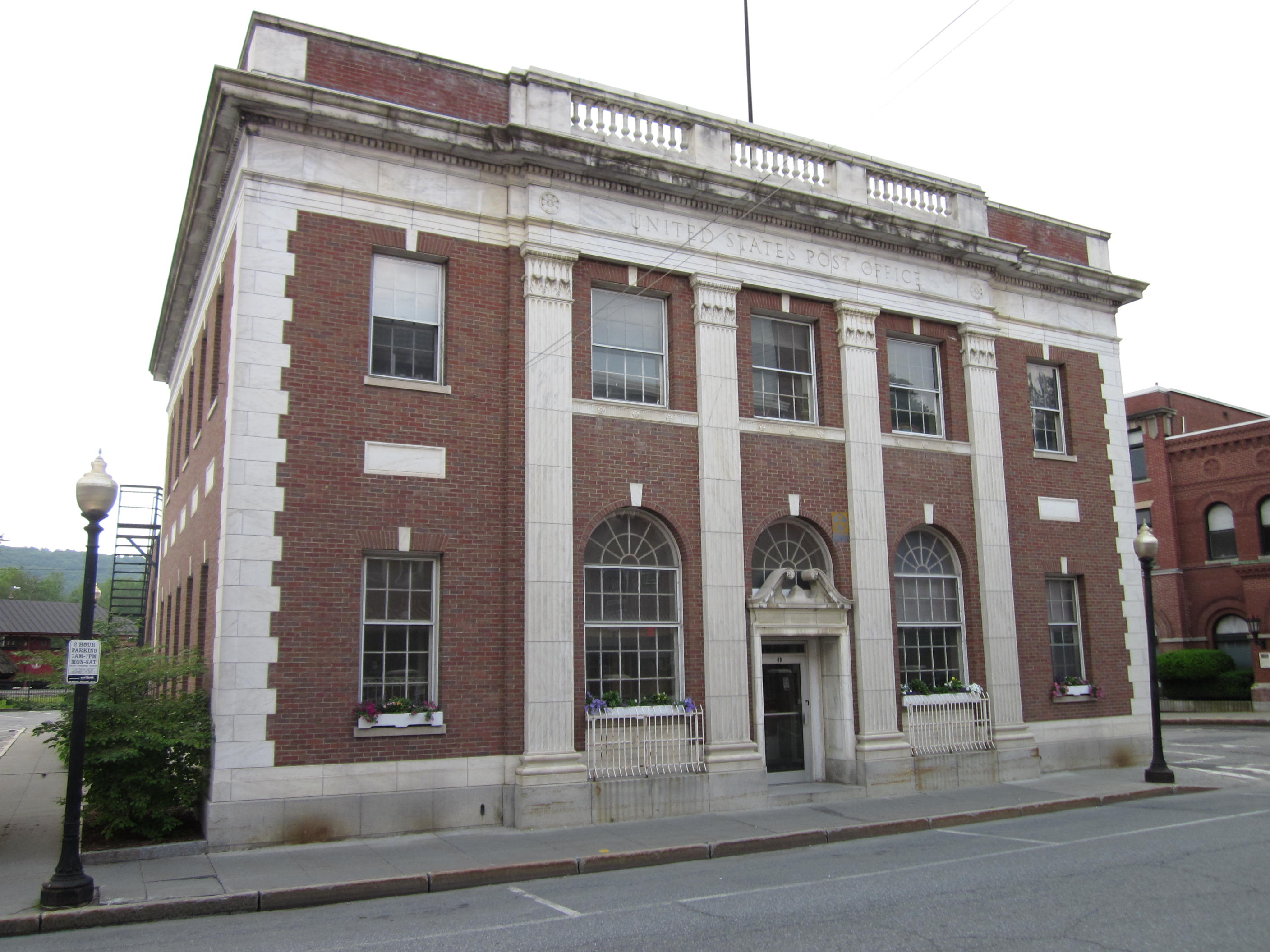
- The former post office building

- Location within Vermont Location within the United States
- Location: Railroad Row, Main, Currier, Bridge, and Gates Sts. (original); N. Main St., S. Main St. Bridge St., Gates St. and Church St. (2002 increase), Hartford, Vermont
- Coordinates: 43°38′53″N 72°19′9″W
- Area: 12 acres (4.9 ha) (original) 30 acres (12 ha) (after 2002 increase)
- Architectural style: Greek Revival, Colonial Revival, Richardsonian Romanesque (original); Italianate, Romanesque (increase)
- NRHP reference No.: 80000390 (original); 02001553 (increase 1); 100004755 (increase 2)

Significant dates
- Added to NRHP: August 22, 1980
- Boundary increases: December 20, 2002; December 10, 2019

White River Junction Historic District is a historic district in the unincorporated village of White River Junction, within the town of Hartford, Vermont. It was first listed on the National Register of Historic Places in 1980, and its boundaries were increased in 2002 and 2019. It originally encompassed the central portion of the village's business district, and was then expanded to include a broader array of resources.

== Description and history ==
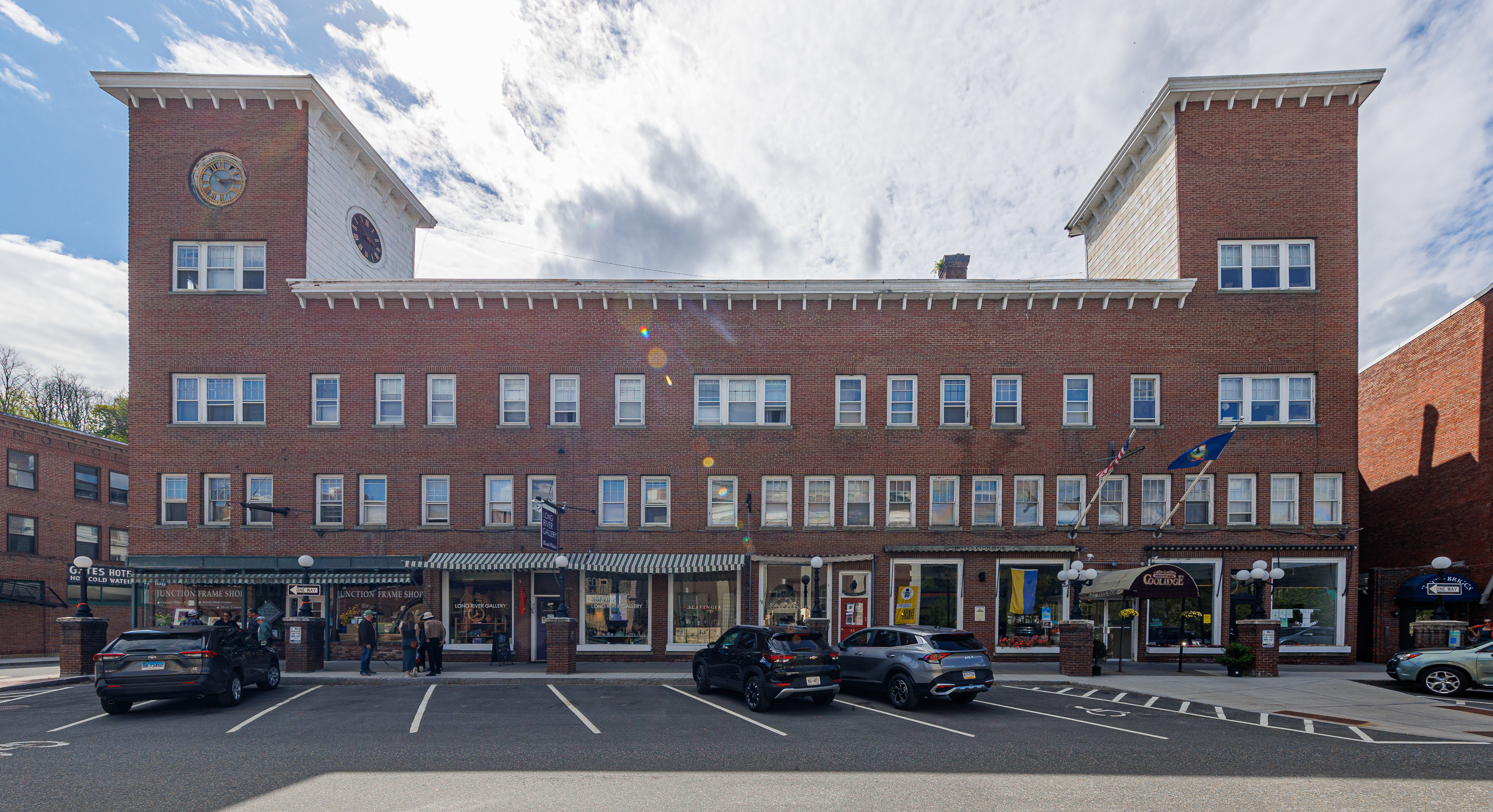
Coolidge Hotel, 1924

The village of White River Junction is located in central eastern Vermont, at the mouth of the White River where it joins the Connecticut River. First settled in the 1760s, it was from the 1840s to the 1960s the most important railroad junction in northern New England, providing an interchange point between the Boston and Maine Railroad (originally known as the Connecticut River Railroad), the Vermont Central Railway, which served Burlington, the Passumpsic Rivers Railroad, which served Newport, the Northern New Hampshire Railroad, serving Concord, New Hampshire and Boston, Massachusetts, and the Woodstock Railway, serving Woodstock, Vermont. Its central business district is located southwest of a bend in the Vermont Central tracks, which roughly parallel the White River as it enters the Connecticut. Over the period of its economic height, the business area grew, mainly to the west and south, with residential areas in the surrounding uplands and across the White River. The village's economy declined after railroad service was reduced in the mid-20th century.

When first listed on the National Register in 1980, the historic district encompassed a portion of the central business district, oriented around the junction of Main and Gates Streets, extending only to Currier Street and across the railroad tracks to the historic passenger depot, which now serves Amtrak's Vermonter service. In 2002, its boundaries were enlarged to include most of the business district along with some immediately adjacent residential areas. The central portion of the business district is populated by mainly brick buildings, two and three stories in height, while its outlying areas (for example, further out on South and North Main Street), buildings are less densely spaced, and include some wood frame commercial buildings. The expanded historic district also includes the surviving railroad bridge across the White River, the 1884–1895 high school building located on the north side of the White River, and the Progressive Market, an important surviving example of a local ethnic market building.

== See also ==
- National Register of Historic Places listings in Windsor County, Vermont
