= Holy Trinity Episcopal Church (Swanton, Vermont) =

Historic church in Vermont, United States

- Parish of the Holy Trinity
- U.S. National Register of Historic Places
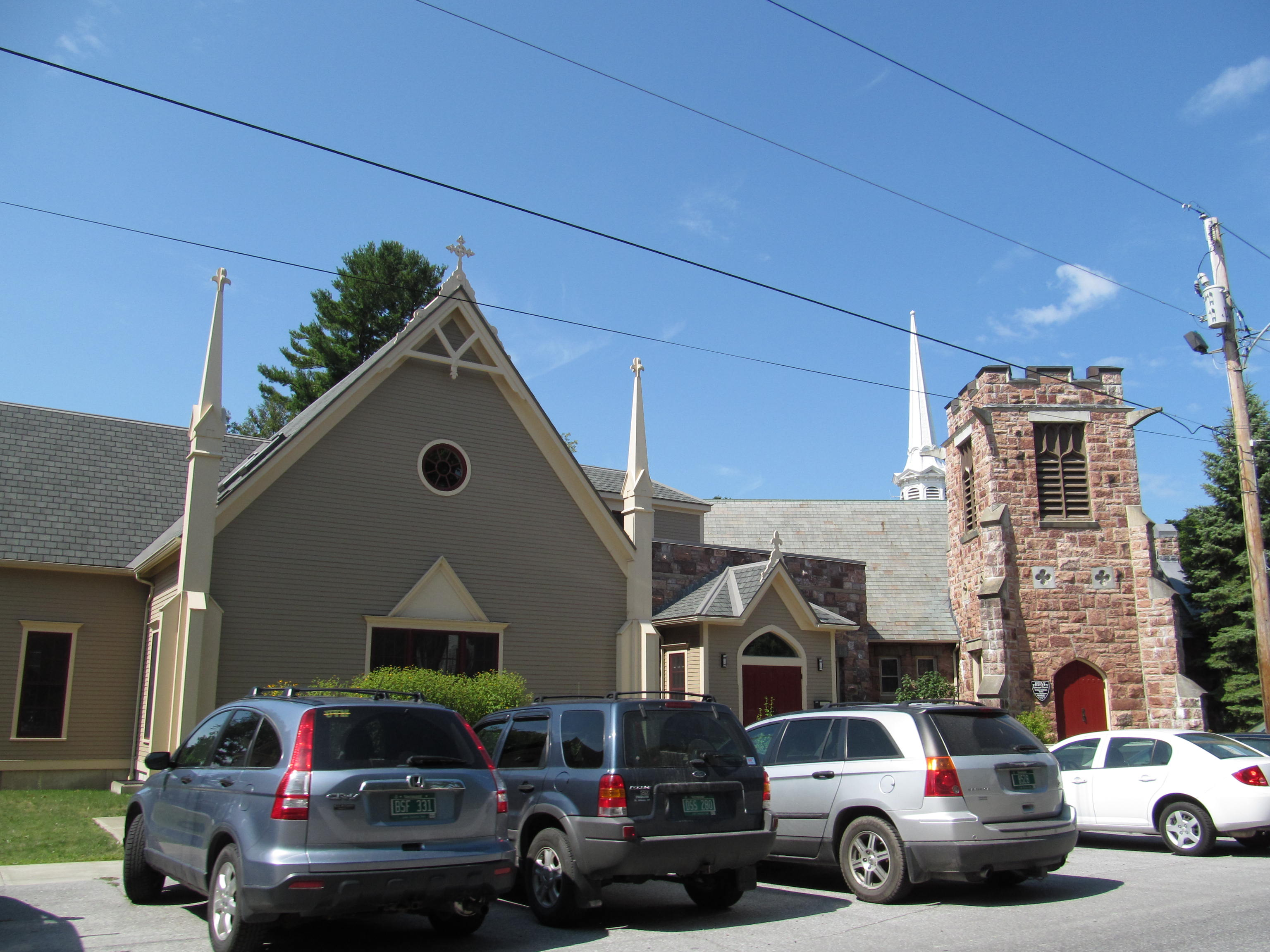

- Location within Vermont Location within the United States
- Location: 38 Grand Ave., Swanton Village, Vermont
- Coordinates: 44°55′2″N 73°7′25″W
- Area: less than one acre
- Built: 1876
- Built by: Ira D. Hatch
- Architect: Louis S. Newton
- Architectural style: Carpenter Gothic
- MPS: Religious Buildings, Sites and Structures in Vermont MPS
- NRHP reference No.: 01000221
- Added to NRHP: March 2, 2001

Holy Trinity Episcopal Church also known as Holy Trinity Memorial Church is an historic Episcopal church building located at 38 Grand Avenue in the village of Swanton, Franklin County, Vermont. Built in 1876 and expanded in 1909-10, the church facilities include a fine example of the Carpenter Gothic in the older section (now the parish hall), and the Late Victorian Gothic Revival in the newer section. The church was listed on the National Register of Historic Places as the Parish of the Holy Trinity in 2001. The church is an active parish in the Episcopal Diocese of Vermont; its current rector is the Rev. Kathleen Schotto.

The church reported 162 members in 2022 and 117 members in 2023; no membership statistics were reported in 2024 parochial reports. Plate and pledge income reported for the congregation in 2024 was $43,639 with average Sunday attendance (ASA) of 39 persons. This was a relative decrease from ASA of 63 reported in 2019.

== Architecture and history ==
The Holy Trinity Church stands in the center of Swanton village, at the southern end of the village green, next to the Swanton Christian Church and the town hall. The main body of the church is oriented to face the green across Academy Street, while the parish hall, its former building, is angled to face Grand Avenue, with the rectory to its east. Both have steeply pitched roofs. The main sanctuary is a stone structure, built out of locally quarried red and purple marble. It has high-style Gothic Revival features including a buttressed square tower with a crenellated flat top, and a large Gothic-arched stained glass window at the center of the street-facing facade. The altar is made of white marble from Proctor, Vermont, and has terra cotta inlays. The parish hall has a Stick style decorative application at the top of its street-facing gable, and has stepped corner buttresses rising to pinnacles at the corners.

The Holy Trinity congregation was organized in 1824, and originally met in the church next door, which it shared with several other congregations. It was dormant between 1834 and 1867, at which point it was reorganized, and its membership began to organize for the acquisition of a dedicated building. The present Carpenter Gothic parish hall was built in 1876 to a design by Ira D. Hatch, a local resident. The town and congregation both experienced significant growth in the following decades, and the new stone sanctuary was added in 1909-10, a gift from the Rev. Edward Stone. It was designed by Louis S. Newton of Hartford, Vermont, and is a prominent local example of a High Gothic Revival style. The 1876 building was at that time adapted for its present use as a parish hall.

== See also ==
- National Register of Historic Places listings in Franklin County, Vermont
