= Williston Historic District =

- U.S. National Register of Historic Places
- U.S. Historic district
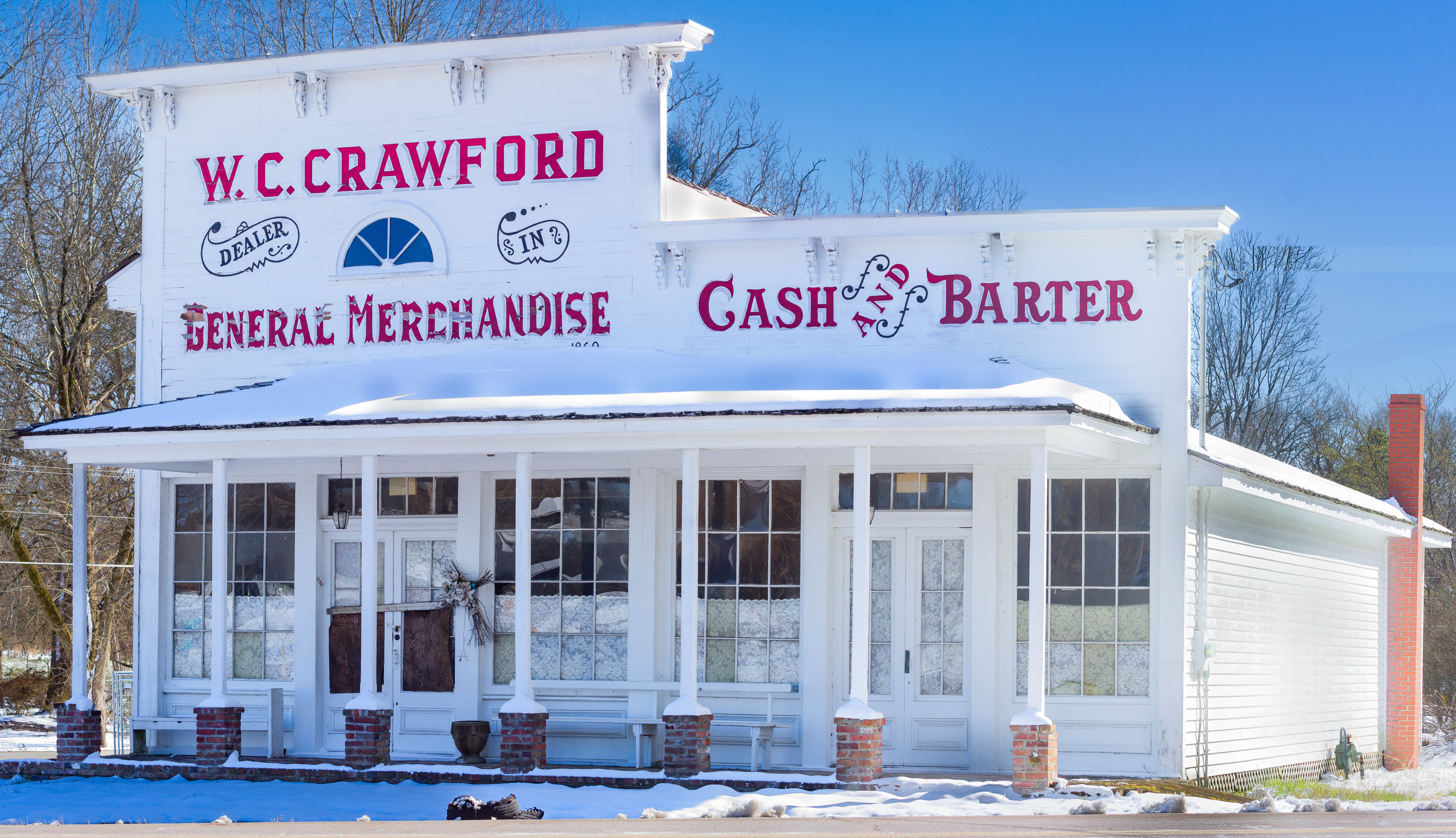
- Crawford General Store, an individually listed contributing property to the district

- Location within Tennessee Location within the United States
- Location: Roughly, along Hotel and Railroad Sts. and Walker Ave., Williston, Tennessee
- Coordinates: 35°09′39″N 89°22′22″W
- Area: 200 acres (81 ha)
- Architectural style: Greek Revival, Italianate, Colonial Revival
- NRHP reference No.: 95001409
- Added to NRHP: December 14, 1995

The Williston Historic District in Williston, Tennessee, is a historic district which was listed on the National Register of Historic Places in 1995.

The 200 acres (81 ha) listed area included 42 contributing buildings and a contributing site.

The district includes:

- Crawford General Store, separately listed on the National Register
- Crawford's Experiment Farm, separately listed on the National Register
- Hugh F. Crawford House (c.1840-50), 290 Hotel Street, built as a one-story, three-bay, cottage with Greek Revival influence, modified to two-stories with Craftsman influence in c.1910-15.
