= West Hartford, Vermont =

- West Hartford Village Historic District
- U.S. National Register of Historic Places
- U.S. Historic district
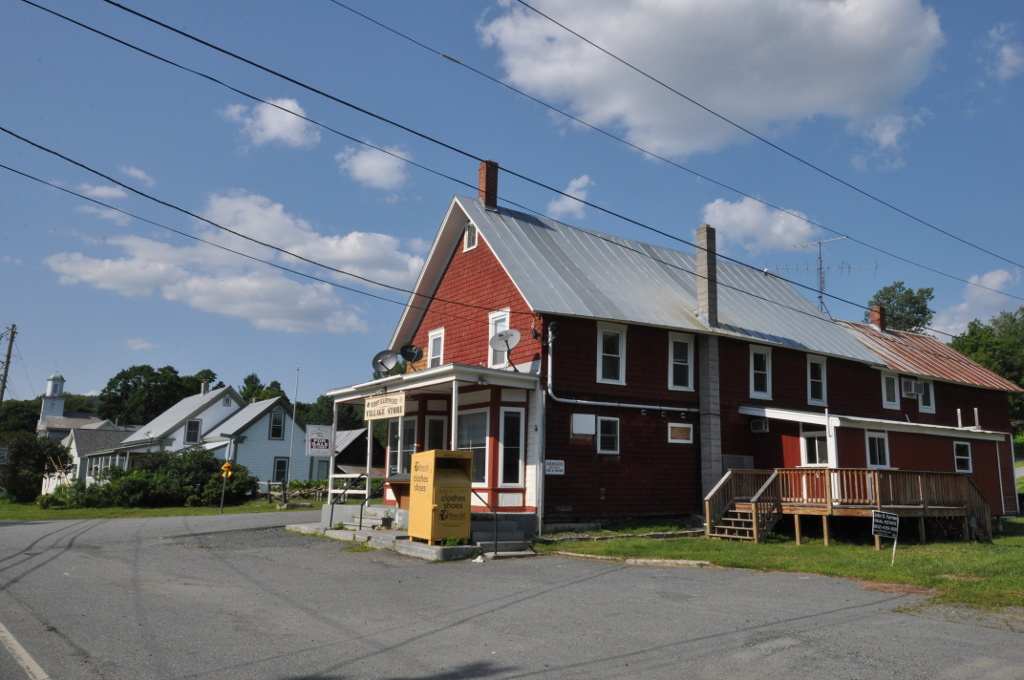
- The former West Hartford Village Store

- Location within Vermont Location within the United States
- Location: VT 14, Harper Savage Ln., Tigertown Rd., and Stetson Rd., Hartford, Vermont
- Coordinates: 43°42′59″N 72°24′58″W
- Area: 47 acres (19 ha)
- Architectural style: Federal, Greek Revival
- NRHP reference No.: 04001368
- Added to NRHP: December 15, 2004

West Hartford is an unincorporated community village in the town of Hartford, Windsor County, Vermont, United States. It is one of Hartford's five villages, situated on the White River and crossed by the Appalachian Trail.

West Hartford no longer has a post office, but still has a local library, and a town park. The White River, is a nearby fishing site. The village's center is listed on the National Register of Historic Places as the West Hartford Village Historic District.

== Geography ==
West Hartford is located in far northern Hartford, seven river miles up the White River from its mouth at the Connecticut River. Its center is at geographical coordinates 43° 42′ 44" North, 72° 25′ 7" West (43.71212, -72.418541). The White River runs through the Village and along Clifford Park.

== History ==
The village of West Hartford was settled during the late 18th century, primarily organized around mills and outlying agricultural areas. The oldest surviving house in the village was built in 1795 by Francis and Abigail (Hazen) Savage. Abigail was the granddaughter of the area's first colonial landowner. A turnpike, now Vermont Route 14, was built along the river in 1800. The focal center of the village was established at Harper Savage Lane by construction of its first bridge to span the White River in 1820, and then by the construction of a railroad station nearby. By 1830, the village had a church and post office, and the village continued to thrive during the 19th century, mainly due to its proximity to White River Junction, an important railroad hub in the region. Much of the village was destroyed by a major flood in 1867. This natural disaster destroyed much of the local industry, with the exception of retail which continued, driven by the presence of the railroad.

In the spring of 1927, the Vermont rivers flooded, taking out several bridges including the West Hartford Bridge, then a covered bridge. Shortly after the flood, the bridges were all replaced with simple contemporary bridges that were tall, green, and steel trussed. In 2006, the West Hartford Bridge was replaced with a new single-span bridge named Veterans Bridge. The old bridge had a pool off of the downstream side where locals would jump off the bridge into the water. The new bridge is in a location where it is dangerous to jump because the deep pool is no longer accessible, although teens, children, and adults still jump off the bridge. At the foot of the new bridge, there is a small area in remembrance of Hartford Veterans.

Clifford Park is a town maintained park that includes nature trails, a softball field, horseshoe pits, and a picnic area on the river. Every summer, it is turned into a major landing area for the hot air balloons that have taken off at the Quechee Balloon Festival, and every Halloween it is the Haunted Area for local youths sponsored by the Hartford Parks and Recreation Department. The park is named Clifford, after the former owner of the land that now holds the park, and the land that is the Westfield Drive community.

On August 28, 2011, West Hartford was hit by Tropical Storm Irene. Several houses, the country store, the library, and the post office were affected. The post office was torn down, the store repaired, and the library has been rebuilt.

The bridge and road also suffered damage from this event. The bridge was out of commission for several weeks, forcing people to find alternative routes to get to work and into more populated areas. As for the road, Route 14, it was usable to a certain point. It was repaired slowly and in the village itself there were several large holes where the river gouged away the pavement, dirt, and gravel. In August 29, residents and volunteers were using their tractors and snowplows to clear Route 14 of mud and debris. The town's church was used as a place for gathering donated items and food to be collected for the victims of Storm Irene.

The storm left Clifford Park significantly damaged. It accumulated at least a foot of mud, and the playground, basketball half-court, tennis courts, and baseball field all had to be reconstructed. There are picnic tables underneath a shade structure, and benches stand here and there around the perimeter of the field, and the gravel parking lot is now outlined by a wooden fence.

Debris has been cleared and restoration is complete, but evidence of the storm's destruction can still be observed. Houses, roads, and riverbanks still bear the mark of Irene in erosion and weathering.

== Schools ==
West Hartford elementary students attend Ottauquechee School in Quechee, VT (K-5) and attend middle and high school at Hartford Memorial Middle School (6-8) and Hartford High School (9-12). Large private schools in the area include: the Upper Valley Waldorf School in Quechee (K-8), Mid Vermont Christian School in Quechee (K-6) and the Middle School (7-8) and High School (9-12).

== See also ==
- National Register of Historic Places listings in Windsor County, Vermont
