= Hartford (village), Vermont =

Census-designated place in Vermont, United States

- Hartford Village Historic District
- U.S. National Register of Historic Places
- U.S. Historic district
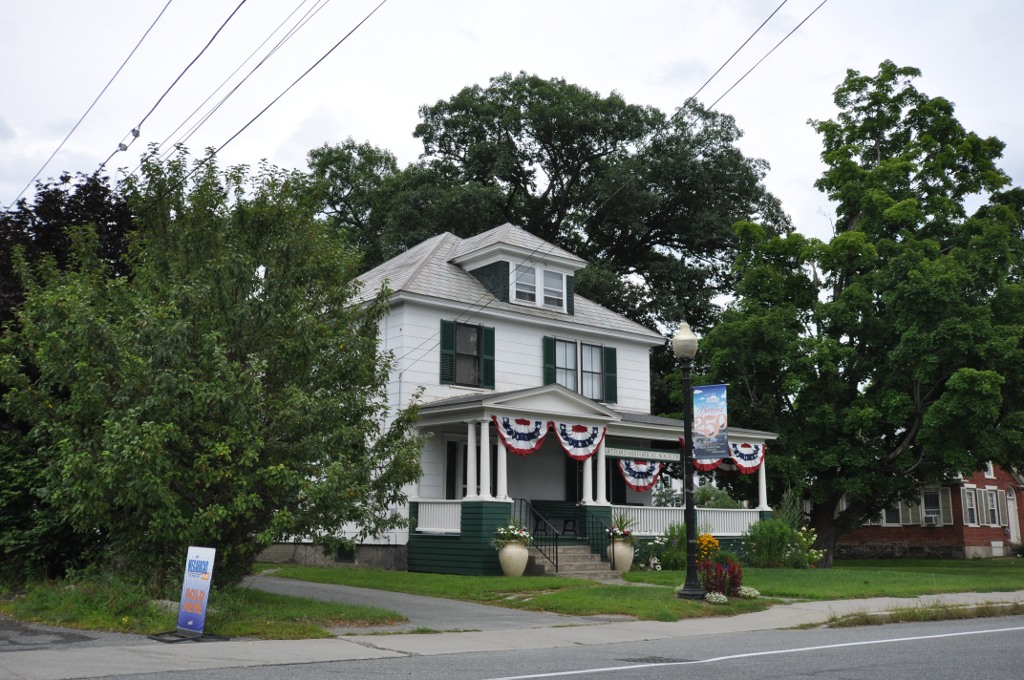
- Hartford Historical Society building

- Location within Vermont Location within the United States
- Location: Roughly along Hartford Main, Summer and Christian Sts., Hartford, Vermont
- Coordinates: 43°39′45″N 72°20′23″W
- Area: 50 acres (20 ha)
- Built: 1801
- Architect: Dana, Jebediah; et al.
- Architectural style: Federal, Greek Revival, Queen Anne
- NRHP reference No.: 98001153
- Added to NRHP: September 3, 1998

Hartford is one of five unincorporated villages in the town of Hartford, Windsor County, Vermont, United States. For the 2020 census it was listed as the Hartford Village census-designated place, with a population of 754, out of 10,686 in the entire town of Hartford.

Hartford is the birthplace of Horace Wells, the first dentist to use nitrous oxide or "laughing gas" as anesthesia.

== History ==
Hartford village was first established in the late 18th century, when it was called White River Village. In its early years, it was the town's principal community center, but it was later supplanted in that role by White River Junction, which is approximately one mile east of Hartford village. In the 19th century Hartford village was the site of several industries, including a grain mill, a chair factory, and a woolen mill.

=== Hartford Village Historic District ===
The Hartford Village Historic District was listed on the National Register of Historic Places in 1998. The 50-acre (20 ha) historic district includes portions of Hartford Main Street, Park Street, Pleasant Street, School Street, Summer Street, Elmwood Court, Mapleside Terrace. There are 80 contributing and 20 non-contributing buildings in the district, consisting mainly of 19th-century era residences.

Some of the more significant properties in the historic district are:

1. Second Congregational Church, 237 Hartford Main Street, 1828.
2. Hartford Library, 217 Hartford Main Street, 1893.
3. Gov. Samuel E. Pingree House, 13 School Street, c.1867.
4. Hartford Village Grammar School, 23 School Street, 1906.
5. Cascadnac Grange, 194 Hartford Main Street, c.1870.
6. Hartford Diner, 190 Hartford Main Street, c.1940.
7. Kneeland-Cone House, 173 Hartford Main Street, 1804, 1890/1897.
8. Wyllys Lyman House, 185 Hartford Main Street, 1828.
9. Brooks Store-Pease Block, 201-203 Hartford Main Street, c.1900.
10. French Mercantile Block, 209 Hartford Main Street, 1804.
11. Horace Pease House ("Sunnyacre")/Elks Lodge, 215 Hartford Main Street, 1884.
12. Ephraim Morris House, 221 Hartford Main Street, 1894.
13. House (Horace Wells birthplace), 9 School Street, c.1840.

== See also ==
- National Register of Historic Places listings in Windsor County, Vermont
