= Swanton Christian Church =

Historic church in Vermont, United States

- First Congregational Church of Swanton
- U.S. National Register of Historic Places
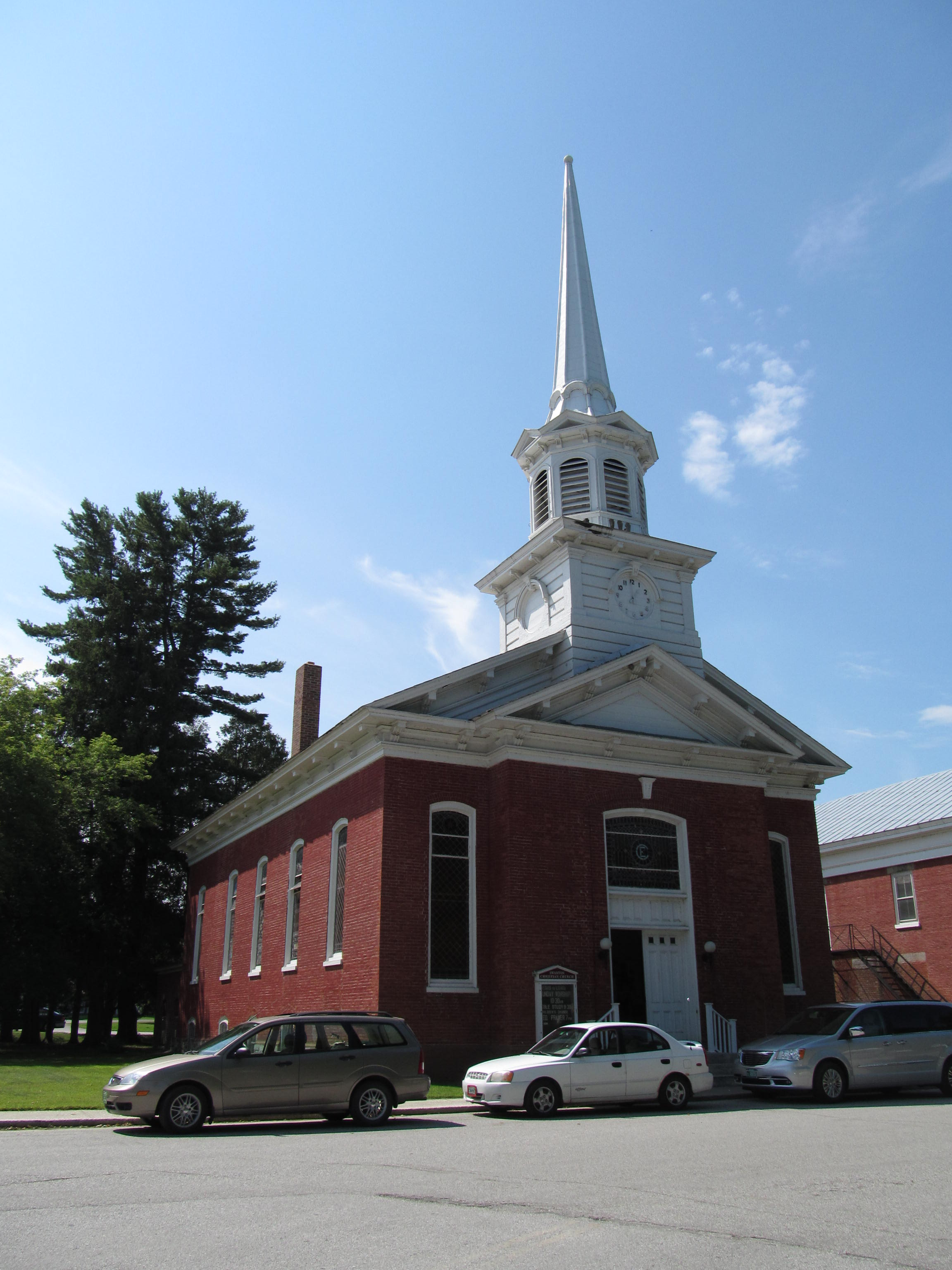

- Location within Vermont Location within the United States
- Location: 42 Academy St., Swanton Village, Vermont
- Coordinates: 44°55′2″N 73°7′21″W
- Area: less than one acre
- Built: 1823
- Architect: Joseph A. Gallagher, Elisha Barney
- Architectural style: Italianate
- MPS: Religious Buildings, Sites and Structures in Vermont MPS
- NRHP reference No.: 01000220
- Added to NRHP: March 2, 2001

The Swanton Christian Church, formerly the First Congregational Church of Swanton, Old Brick Meetinghouse, and New Wine Christian Fellowship is a historic church in the village of Swanton, Vermont. Built in 1823 and remodeled in 1869, it is a prominent landmark in the village, and a fine local example of Italianate styling on a Federal period building. It was listed on the National Register of Historic Places in 2001.

== Architecture and history ==
The Swanton Christian Church building is prominently situated at the southern end of the Swanton village green, between the former Swanton Academy building (now housing town offices) and the Holy Trinity Episcopal Church parish hall. It is a brick building, three bays wide and five deep, with a gabled roof. A tower rises from the front roofline, beginning with a square base housing a clock. It is topped by an extended modillioned cornice, above which is an octagonal belfry. Each facade of the belfry stage is topped by a bracketed low-pitch gable, and a narrow steeple rises above. The center bay of the main facade is a gabled projection, with the main entrance set in a tall segmented-arch opening. Windows in the flanking bays and the sides are also set in segmented-arch openings.

Swanton was incorporated in 1790, and its town center was laid out in 1803. Its Congregational Society was organized in 1801, and met in schoolhouses and other local buildings until 1817, when the society built a union meetinghouse with the local Baptist congregation. The present brick church was built in 1823 by a union of four different congregations. The Methodist ended their use of the building in 1848, the Quakers in 1865, and the Congregational Society purchased the interest of the Methodists in 1867. Over the next two years, the building was enlarged and given its present Italianate styling. The building is now occupied by a non-denominational Christian congregation.

== See also ==
- National Register of Historic Places listings in Franklin County, Vermont
