= Miller House (Elba, Tennessee) =

- U.S. National Register of Historic Places
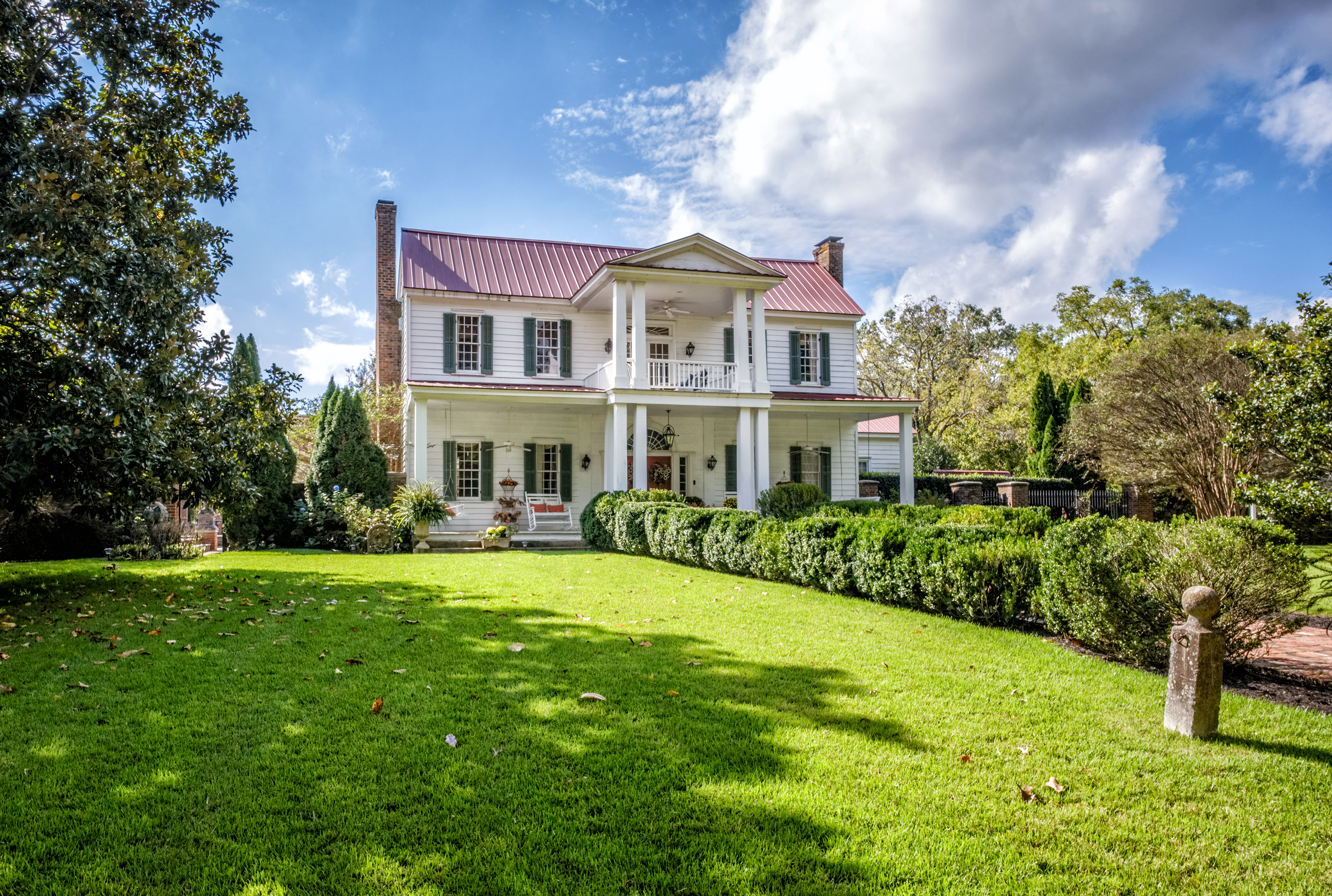

- Location within Tennessee
- Nearest city: Elba, Tennessee
- Coordinates: 35°06′34″N 89°34′36″W
- Area: 6.5 acres (2.6 ha)
- Built: 1840
- Architectural style: Federal
- NRHP reference No.: 78002587
- Added to NRHP: December 8, 1978

The Miller House is a historic house on a former plantation in Elba, Tennessee, U.S.. It was built in 1840 for William Miller. It was designed in the Federal architectural style, with a Greek Revival porch. It has been listed on the National Register of Historic Places since December 8, 1978.
