= Immanuel Church (La Grange, Tennessee) =

Historic church in Tennessee, United States

- U.S. National Register of Historic Places
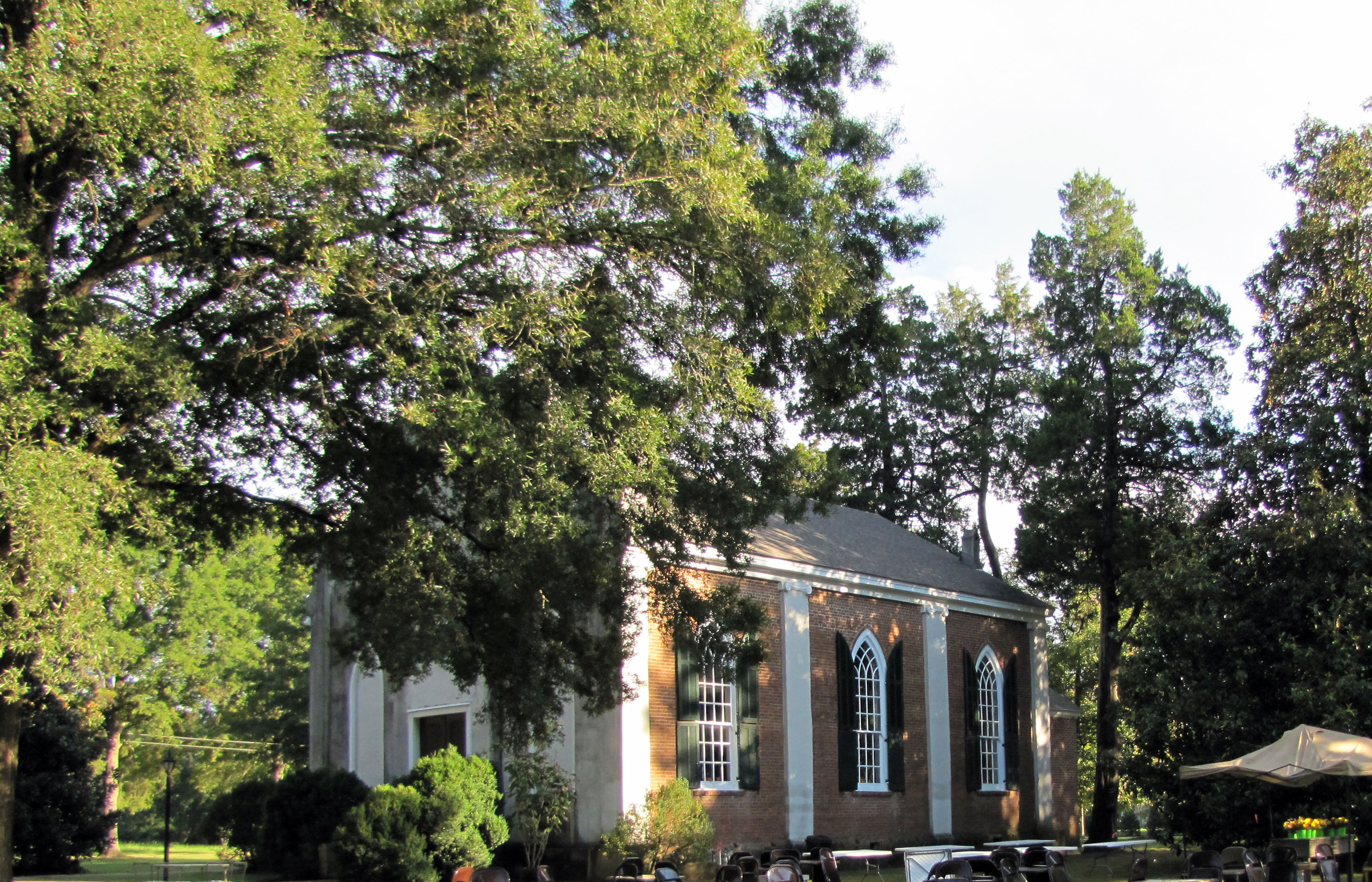

- Location within Tennessee Location within the United States
- Location: 2nd and Chestnut Sts., La Grange, Tennessee
- Coordinates: 35°2′38″N 89°14′31″W
- Area: 2 acres (0.81 ha)
- Built: 1843
- NRHP reference No.: 72001239
- Added to NRHP: April 14, 1972

The Immanuel Church in La Grange, Tennessee is a historic Episcopal church at 2nd and Chestnut Street.

The church was established as a mission in 1832. The church building was built in 1842 and consecrated in 1843. It was added to the National Register of Historic Places in 1972.

During the Civil War, the Union army used it as an armory and hospital. The pews were torn out and used as coffins for Union dead.

It is also a contributing building in the La Grange Historic District, listed on the National Register in 1975.
