= Crawford General Store =

- U.S. National Register of Historic Places
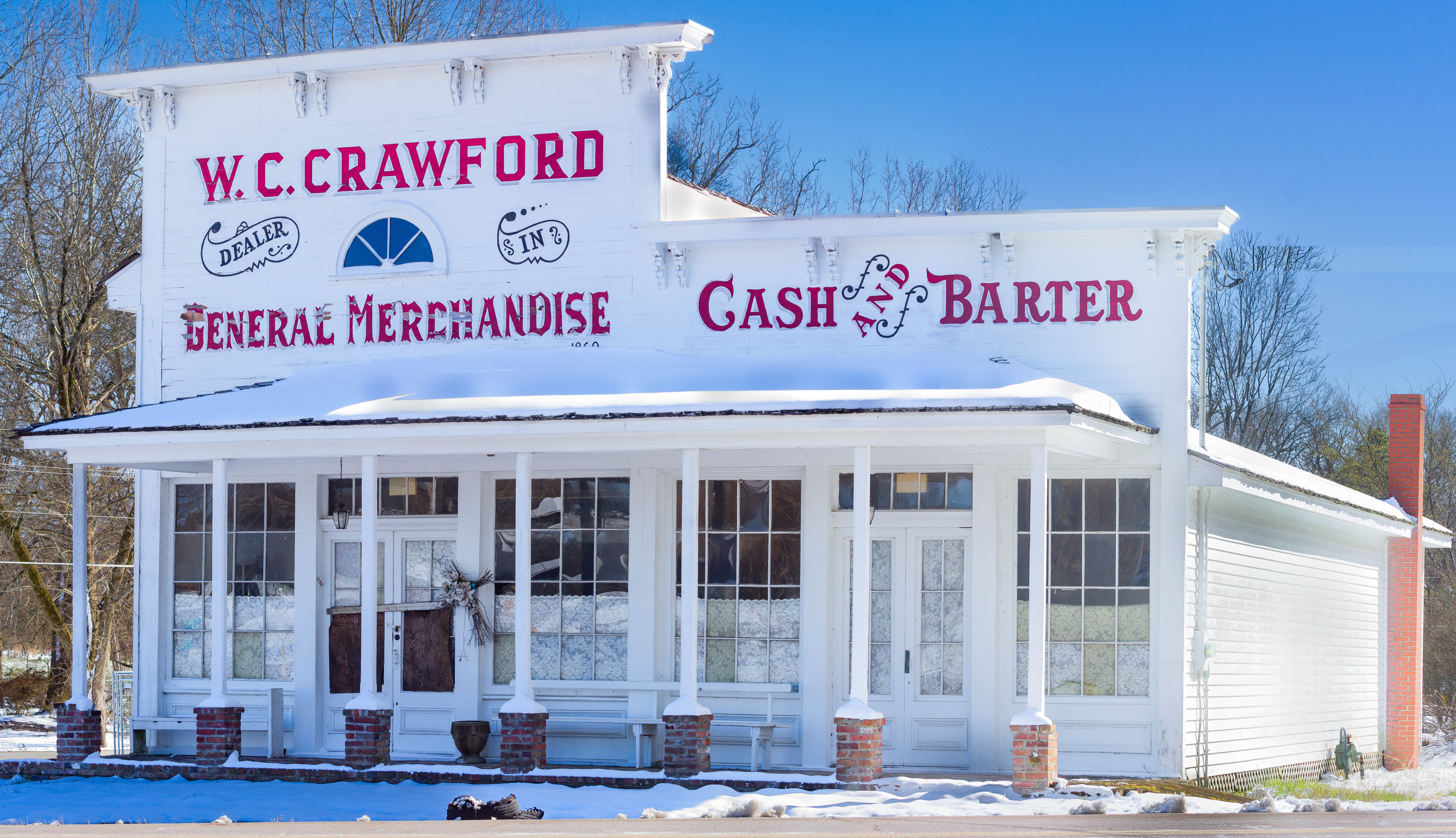

- Location within Tennessee
- Location: 15360 TN-193, Williston, Tennessee
- Coordinates: 35.15860°N 89.37447°W
- Area: 1 acre (0.40 ha)
- Built: 1850
- NRHP reference No.: 75001752
- Added to NRHP: July 8, 1975

The Crawford General Store, on Macon Rd. in Williston, Tennessee, was built around 1850. It was listed on the National Register of Historic Places in 1975.

It was deemed significant as "an unusually good example of a vanishing architectural type—the country general store, specializing in items as varied as dress buckles, butter, mousetraps and medicines. Serving as it did as a sort of clearinghouse for community activities, it represents as well a direct source of clues to the social history of the period. The country store was the economic heart of many early communities, and the store at Williston was no exception. The store was opened in about 1850 by R.A. Gaither. About 1890 operation by W.C. Crawford began, and the business was operated by him and his son, Knox Crawford until 1972."

It is a "simple, two story structure of clapboard painted white. There is a partial false facade rising from the eastern half of the building's front wall, adding architectural interest. There is a very basic portico supported by seven wooden columns. A simple, semi-circular fan window is set into the false front, and the eaves are supported by decorative wooden supports (eight pairs)."

== See also ==
- National Register of Historic Places listings in Fayette County, Tennessee
