= Rossville Historic District (Rossville, Tennessee) =

Historic district in Tennessee, United States

- U.S. National Register of Historic Places
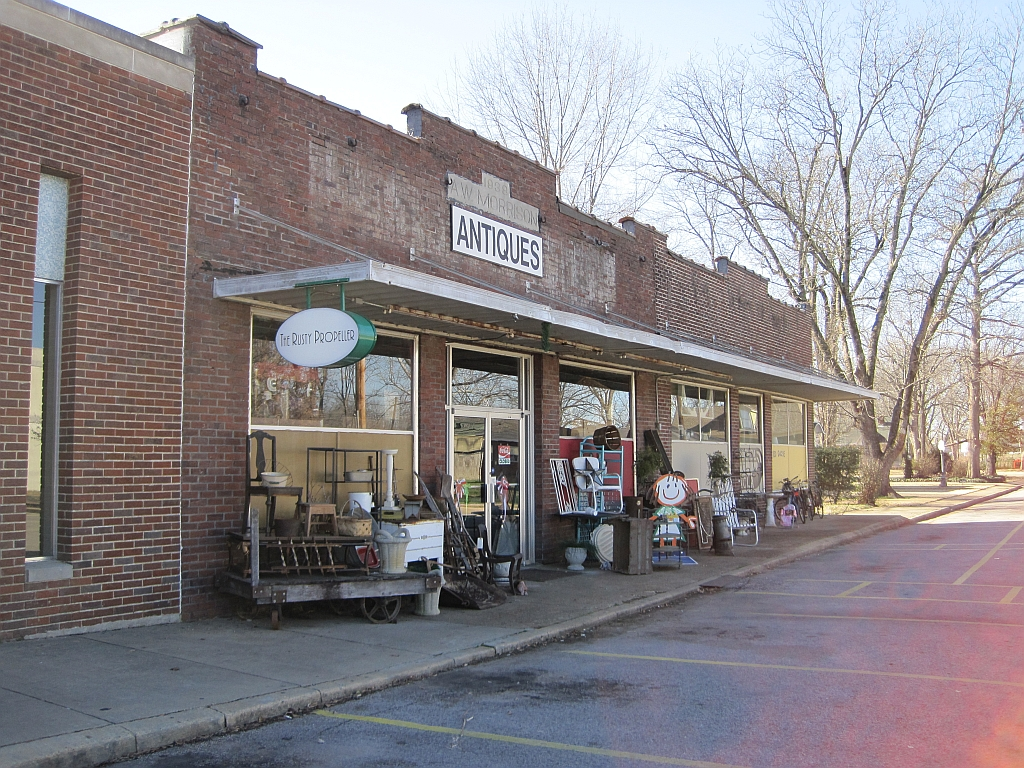
- 60 Front St., the former Rossville Grocery Market, in 2012

- Location within Tennessee
- Location: Roughly along Main, Second, and Front Sts., Rossville, Tennessee
- Coordinates: 35°02′52″N 89°32′35″W
- Area: 16 acres (6.5 ha)
- NRHP reference No.: 01000726
- Added to NRHP: July 19, 2001

The Rossville Historic District in Rossville in Fayette County, Tennessee was listed on the National Register of Historic Places in 2001. It includes 36 contributing buildings and 13 non-contributing ones, on about 16 acres (6.5 ha).

The district runs roughly along Main St. (now Church St., per Google maps), Second St., and Front St. in Rossville, and includes Greek Revival, Colonial Revival, Queen Anne, Gothic Revival, and Craftsman architecture, as well as one or more I-houses and a number of one- and two-part commercial buildings.

Selected properties include:

- 30 Front St. (c.1910). Two-story four-square.
- Morrison's Store / Rossville Grocery Market (c.1938), 60 Front Street. One-story brick commercial building with a stepped parapet with tile coping, which originally was two separate buildings.
- Rossville Bank (c.1953), 70 Front Street. One-story Art Deco with brick veneer and a cast stone stepped parapet.
- 250 Main St. (c.1887). Two-story Queen Anne, with a wrap-around porch with paired round Tuscan columns on stone piers, and with Colonial Revival detailing. Built by/for a woman, P.C. Stone, whose grandfather and another added its second story.
- 255 Main St. (c.1890). One story L-shaped building with Colonial Revival detailing.
- 270 Main St. (c.1890). One-and-a-half-story Queen Anne cottage.

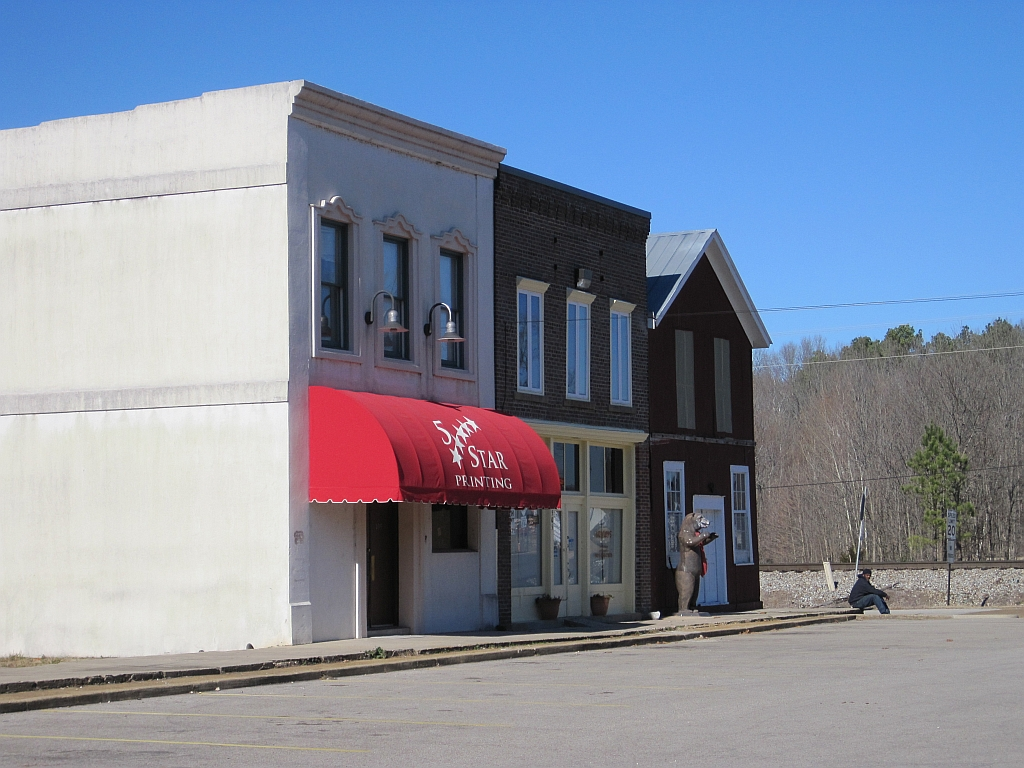
Buildings on Church St. by the railroad, in the district

A walking tour of the historic district is offered annually by a local, private group in Rossville.

== See also ==
- National Register of Historic Places listings in Fayette County, Tennessee
