= Bolivar-Somerville Stage Road =

- U.S. National Register of Historic Places
- Location within Tennessee Location within the United States
- Nearest city: Whiteville, Tennessee
- Coordinates: 35°15′02″N 89°11′13″W
- Area: 19 acres (7.7 ha)
- Built: 1838
- NRHP reference No.: 05000802
- Added to NRHP: August 7, 2005

The Bolivar-Somerville Stage Road is a historic stage road in Tennessee. A 2.3 miles (3.7 km) section about four miles southwest of Whiteville was listed on the National Register of Historic Places in 2005.

The section runs between Hardeman County and Fayette County along what are now Stewart Road and Herron Drive. It runs from the intersection of Whiteville-New Castle Road in Hardeman County, along Stewart Road west 2.3 miles to end at a bridge on a tributary of the Loosahatchie River in Fayette County. The road is known as Herron Drive in the Fayette County section.
