= Crawford's Experiment Farm =

- U.S. National Register of Historic Places
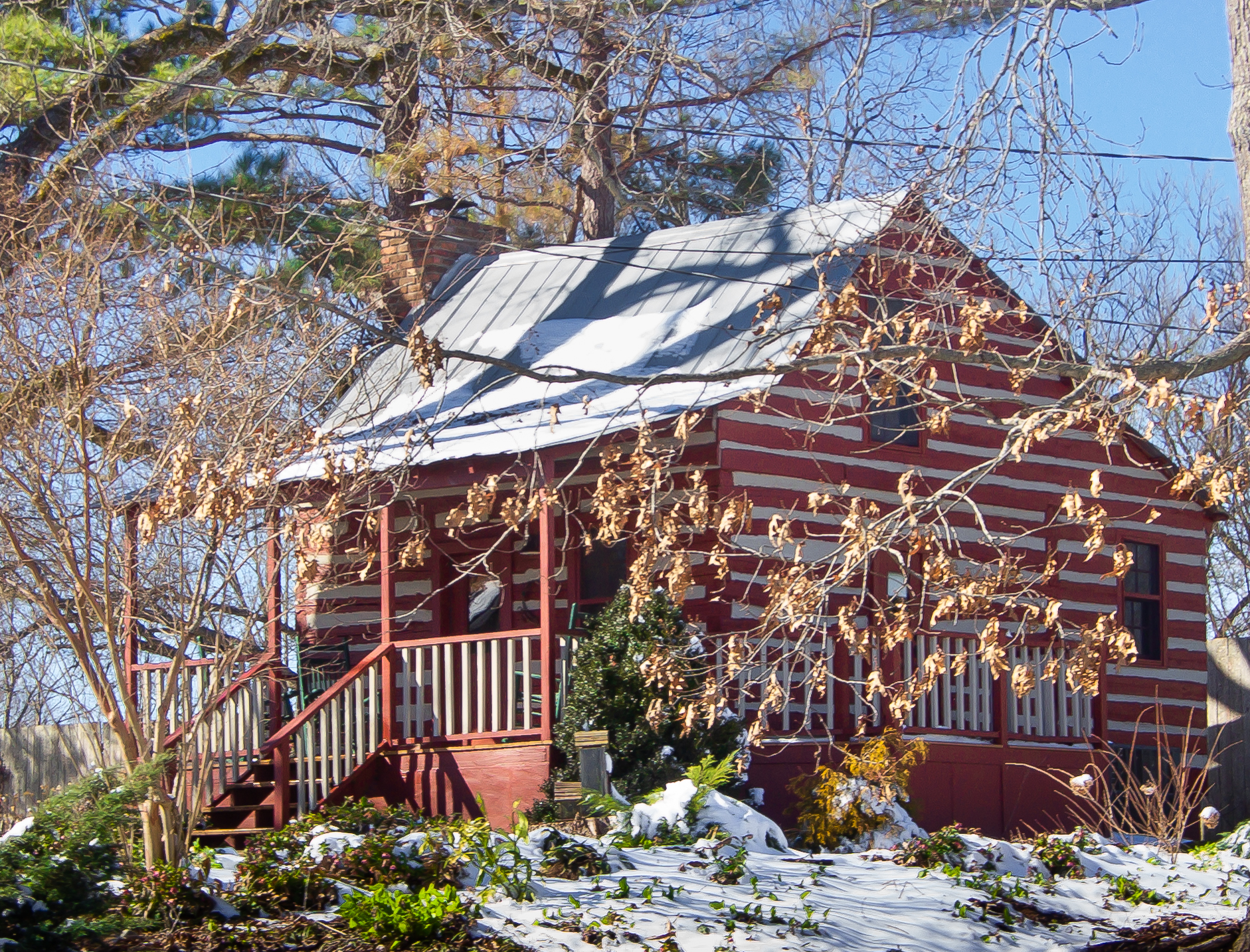
- Location: 6275 Evergreen, Williston, Tennessee
- Coordinates: 35°09′40″N 89°22′24″W
- Area: 4.6 acres (1.9 ha)
- Built: c.1850
- Architectural style: Greek Revival, Vernacular Greek Revival
- NRHP reference No.: 91000247
- Added to NRHP: March 14, 1991

Crawford's Experiment Farm, in Williston, Tennessee, United States, was listed on the National Register of Historic Places in 1991. The listing included three contributing buildings and a contributing structure.

The residence on the property has evolved from an original c.1850 three-bay frame house, with elements of Greek Revival style. An 1867 modification added two bedrooms and an east gallery to the main house. Others are:

- Kitchen (c. 1850)
- Doctor's Office (1867), built by William Harrison Crawford
- Crib (c. 1850), board and batten on brick piers
- Barn (1940), a large, tin, hay barn later converted into a horse barn.

It has also been known as Pleasant Retreat, as Walker Farm, and as Crawford Farm, and is located at the junction of Hotel St. and Old Somerville-Williston Rd.

It is included in the Williston Historic District, also listed on the National Register.
