= Daniel D. Stevens =

United States Navy sailor

Daniel Dickinson Stevens
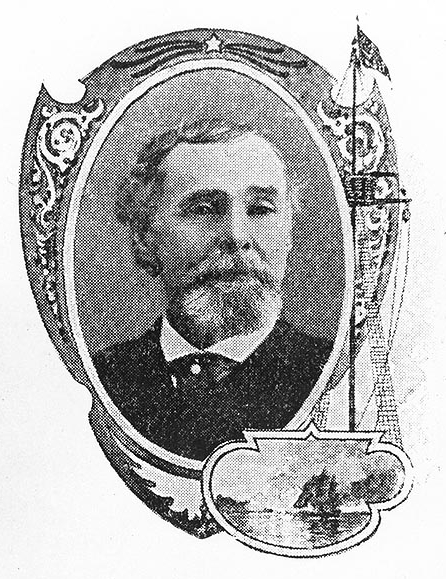
- Chief Quartermaster Daniel Stevens
- Born: December 19, 1839; La Grange, Tennessee, US
- Died: November 7, 1916 (aged 76); Danvers, Massachusetts, US
- Military career
- Allegiance: United States of America; Union
- Branch: United States Navy; Union Navy
- Rank: Chief Quartermaster
- Unit: USS Canonicus
- Conflicts: American Civil War: Second Battle of Fort Fisher
- Awards: Medal of Honor

Daniel Dickinson Stevens (December 19, 1839 – November 7, 1916) was a United States Navy sailor during the American Civil War who received the Medal of Honor, America's highest military decoration, for his actions at the Second Battle of Fort Fisher.

== Biography ==
In mid-January 1865, Stevens was serving as a quartermaster on the USS Canonicus when the ship took part in the bombardment of Fort Fisher, North Carolina. For his conduct during this action, he was awarded the Medal of Honor.

Before leaving the Navy, Stevens reached the rank of Chief Quartermaster.

He was an early member of the Naval Order of the United States and was assigned insignia number 58.

He died at age 76.

== Medal of Honor citation ==

Rank and Organization:

Quartermaster, U.S. Navy. Born: 1840, Sagnange, Tenn. Accredited to: Massachusetts. Letter July 15, 1870, Secretary of the Navy to Hon. S. Hooper.

Citation:

On board the U.S.S. Canonicus during attacks on Fort Fisher, on January 13, 1865. As the Canonicus moved into position at 700 yards from shore, the enemy troops soon obtained her range and opened with heavy artillery fire, subjecting her to several hits and near misses until late in the afternoon when the heavier ships coming into line drove them into their bombproofs. Twice during the battle, in which his ship sustained 36 hits, the flag was shot away and gallantly replaced by Stevens.

== See also ==
- List of American Civil War Medal of Honor recipients: Q–S
