= Oakland Presbyterian Church =

Historic church in Tennessee, United States

- U.S. National Register of Historic Places
- Location within Tennessee Location within the United States
- Location: 14780 Highway 194 South, Oakland, Tennessee
- Coordinates: 35.228398°N 89.514767°W
- Area: 1.6 acres (0.65 ha)
- Built: 1889-91, 1954
- Built by: Baker, J. Frank; Timberlake, S.R.
- Architectural style: Gothic Revival
- NRHP reference No.: 02000235
- Added to NRHP: March 20, 2002

The Oakland Presbyterian Church in Oakland, Tennessee is a historic church built during 1889–91. It was listed on the National Register of Historic Places in 2002.

It is a one-story weatherboard-clad building. In 1954, a one-story gable roof weatherboard addition was built at the rear. It is located at 14780 Tennessee Highway 194 South in Oakland, Tennessee.
