= Daniel A. Dickinson =

American judge (1839–1902)

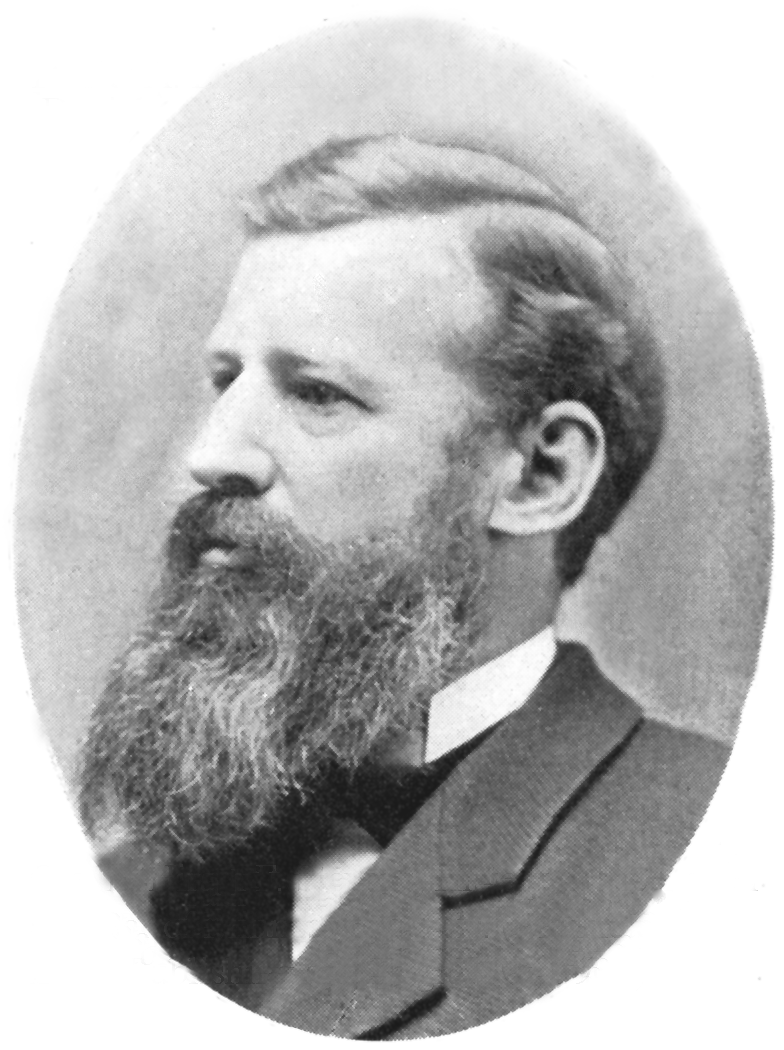
Daniel Ashley Dickinson

Daniel Ashley Dickinson (October 28, 1839 – February 12, 1902) was an American jurist.

== Life ==
Born in Hartford, Vermont, Dickinson graduated from Dartmouth College in 1860. He practiced law in Plattsburgh, New York. He served as paymaster for the United States Navy from 1863 to 1865 during the American Civil War. In 1868, he moved to Mankato, Minnesota and continued to practice law. In 1875, Dickinson served as a Minnesota district court judge. He then served on the Minnesota Supreme Court from 1881 to 1893. In 1894, Dickinson moved to Duluth, Minnesota and continued to practice law. He died in Duluth, Minnesota after a long illness.
