= La Grange Historic District (La Grange, Tennessee) =

- U.S. National Register of Historic Places
- U.S. Historic district
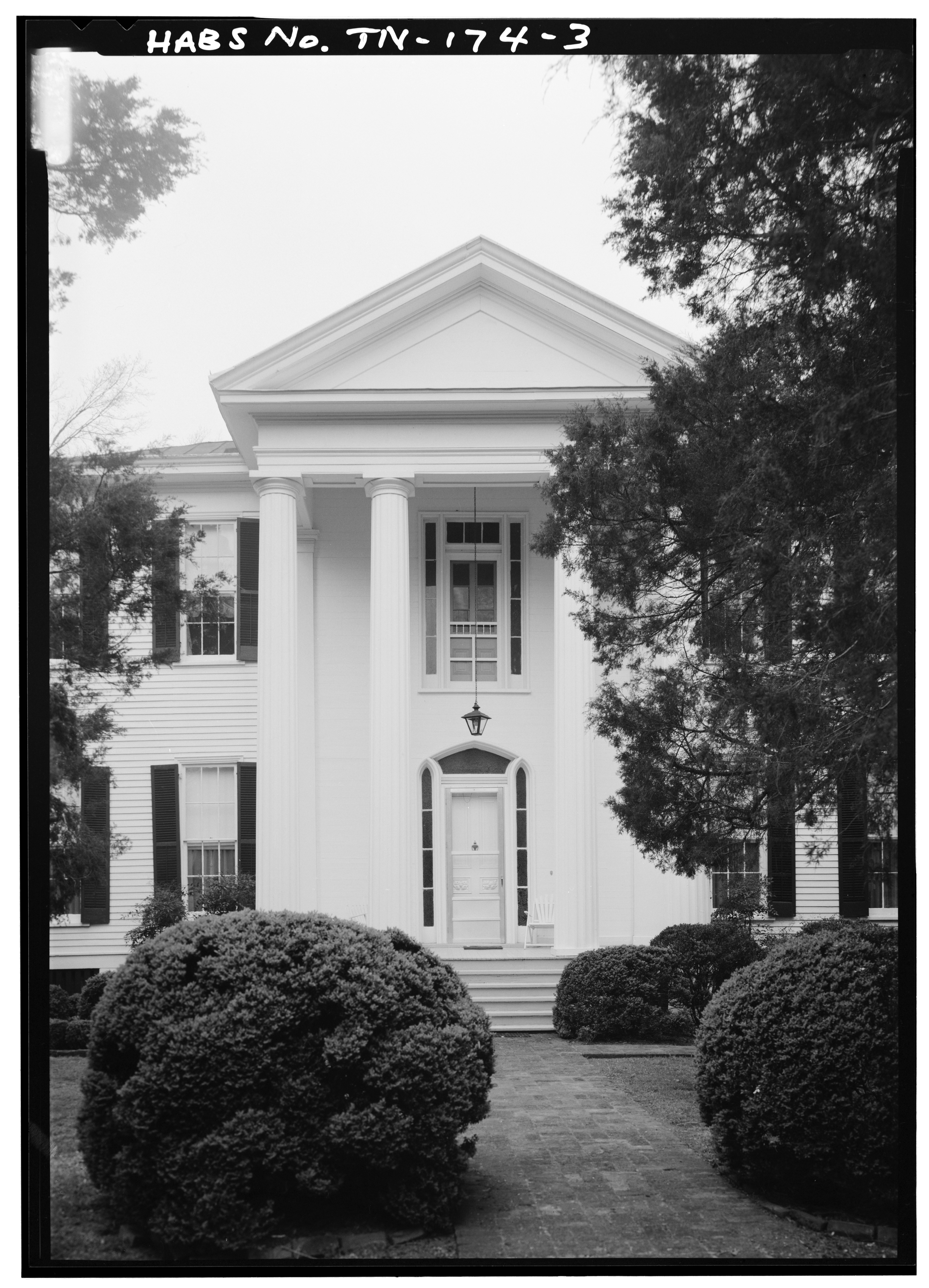
- Hancock Hall
- Nearest city: La Grange, Tennessee
- Area: 1,700 acres (690 ha)
- Architectural style: Greek Revival
- NRHP reference No.: 75001751
- Added to NRHP: April 4, 1975

The La Grange Historic District in La Grange, Tennessee is a 1,700 acres (690 ha) historic district which was listed on the National Register of Historic Places in 1975.

It includes:

- Immanuel Church (La Grange, Tennessee) (c. 1843), which is separately listed on the NRHP
- La Grange Methodist Church, (c. 1832–36)
- Hillcrest (1840), claimed to be "one of the earliest examples of Swiss chalet architecture in America."
- Hancock Hall (1857), known for its double portico, one facing south and one facing west
- more
