= Petersburg Historic District (Petersburg, Tennessee) =

- U.S. National Register of Historic Places
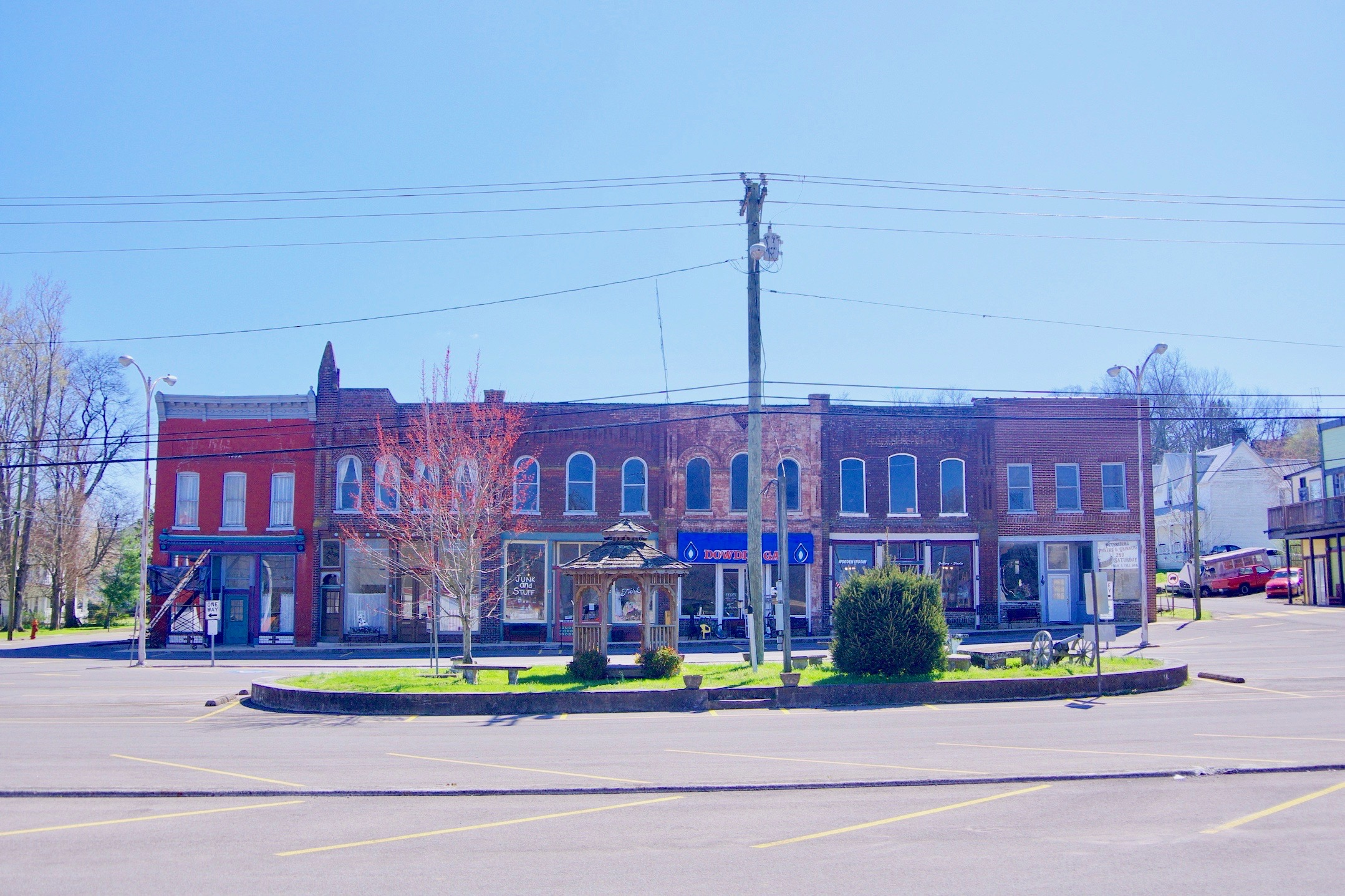
- Historic buildings in Petersburg

- Location within Tennessee
- Location: Roughly bounded by Church, Railroad, Gaunt Sts., and TN 50, Petersburg, Tennessee
- Coordinates: 35°19′03″N 86°38′19″W
- Area: 78 acres (32 ha)
- Built by: Multiple
- Architectural style: Colonial Revival, Greek Revival, Late Victorian
- NRHP reference No.: 85002753
- Added to NRHP: November 7, 1985

The Petersburg Historic District in Petersburg, Tennessee is a 78 acres (32 ha) historic district which was listed on the National Register of Historic Places in 1985. The listing included 126 contributing buildings and three contributing sites.
