= La Grange, Tennessee =

- Town
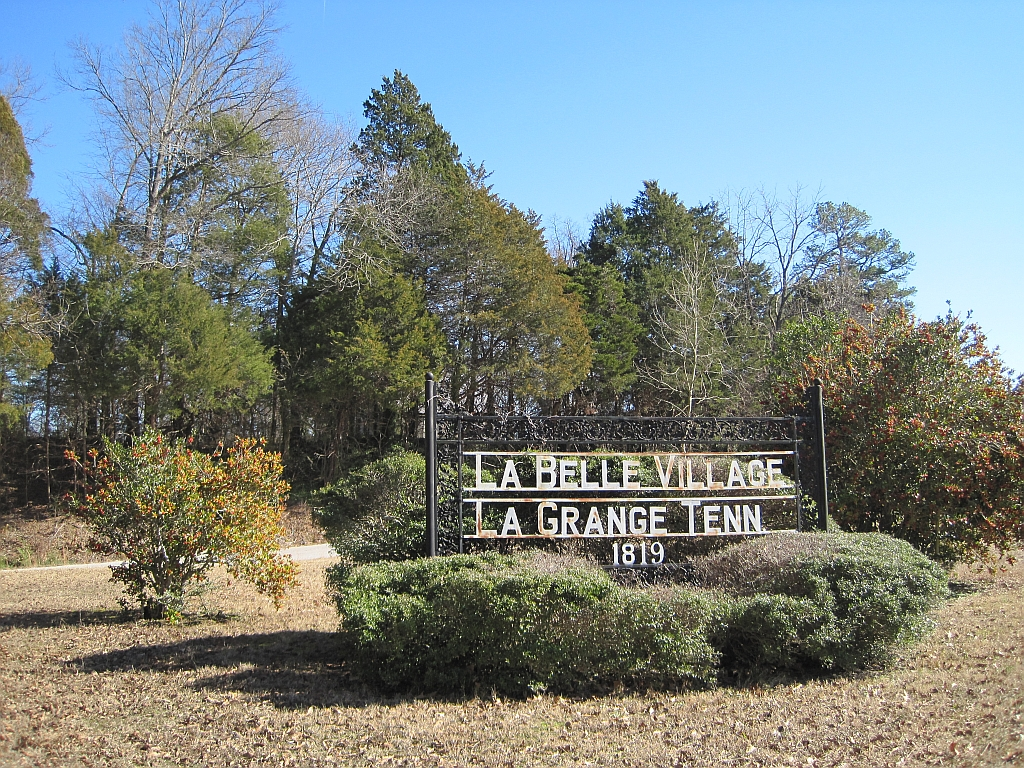

- Location of La Grange in Fayette County, Tennessee.
- Coordinates: 35°2′44″N 89°14′4″W
- Country: United States
- State: Tennessee
- County: Fayette

Area
  - Total: 2.01 sq mi (5.20 km^{2})
  - Land: 2.01 sq mi (5.20 km^{2})
  - Water: 0 sq mi (0.00 km^{2})
- Elevation: 554 ft (169 m)

Population (2020)
  - Total: 123
  - Density: 61.3/sq mi (23.66/km^{2})
- Time zone: UTC-6 (Central (CST))
  - Summer (DST): UTC-5 (CDT)
- ZIP code: 38046
- Area code: 901
- FIPS code: 47-40200
- GNIS feature ID: 1303479
- Website: www.lagrangetn.com

La Grange is a town in Fayette County, Tennessee, United States. As of the 2020 census, La Grange had a population of 123. A large area in the town is listed on the National Register of Historic Places as La Grange Historic District.

== Geography ==
La Grange is located in southeastern Fayette County at 35°2′44″N 89°14′4″W (35.045629, -89.234349). It sits on a ridge 200 feet (60 m) above and 1 mile (1.6 km) north of the Wolf River, a tributary of the Mississippi.

Tennessee State Route 57 passes through the town, leading east 3.5 miles (5.6 km) to Grand Junction and west 9.5 miles (15.3 km) to Moscow. Somerville, the county seat, is 16 miles (26 km) to the north, and downtown Memphis is 47 miles (76 km) to the west.

According to the United States Census Bureau, the town has a total area of 1.8 square miles (4.7 km^{2}), all land.

== Demographics ==
Historical population
Census	Pop.	Note	%±
1860	1,112		—
1870	760		−31.7%
1880	277		−63.6%
1890	500		80.5%
1900	355		−29.0%
1910	308		−13.2%
1920	248		−19.5%
1930	223		−10.1%
1940	243		9.0%
1950	241		−0.8%
1960	217		−10.0%
1970	213		−1.8%
1980	185		−13.1%
1990	167		−9.7%
2000	136		−18.6%
2010	133		−2.2%
2020	123		−7.5%

According to the 2000 census, there were 136 people, 59 households, and 45 families residing in the town. The population density was 85.5 people per square mile (33.0 per square km). There were 69 housing units, at an average density of 43.4 per square mile (16.8/km^{2}). The racial makeup of the town was 83.09% White, 12.50% African American, 0.74% Native American, 2.21% Asian, and 1.47% from two or more races. Hispanic or Latino of any race were 2.94% of the population.

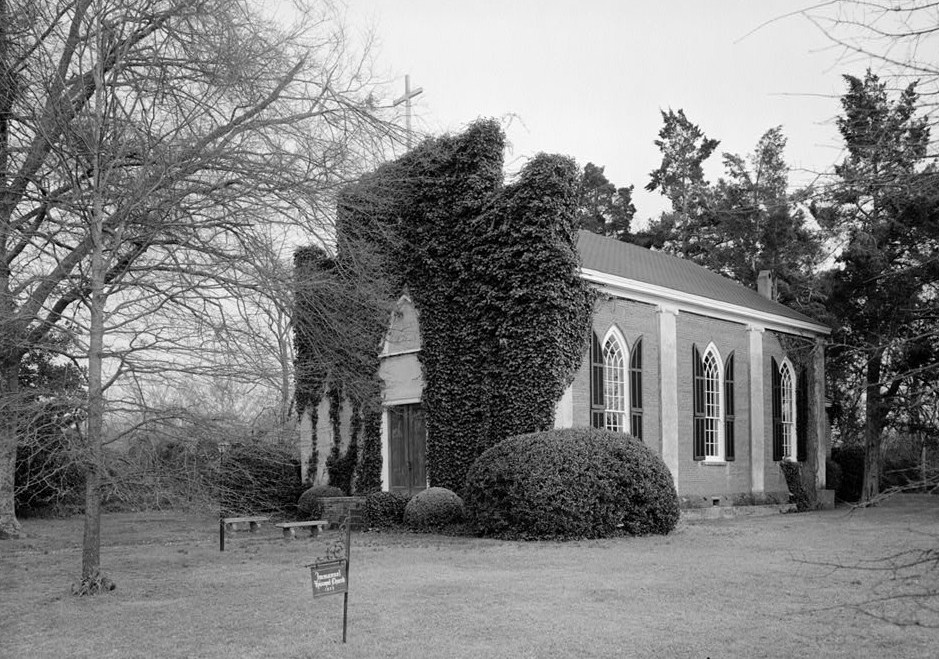
The Immanuel Episcopal Church, listed on the National Register of Historic Places

There were 59 households, out of which 18.6% had children under the age of 18 living with them, 66.1% were married couples living together, 8.5% had a female householder with no husband present, and 23.7% were non-families. 23.7% of all households were made up of individuals, and 6.8% had someone living alone who was 65 years of age or older. The average household size was 2.31 and the average family size was 2.71.

In the town, the population was spread out, with 18.4% under the age of 18, 1.5% from 18 to 24, 22.1% from 25 to 44, 38.2% from 45 to 64, and 19.9% who were 65 years of age or older. The median age was 48 years. For every 100 females, there were 97.1 males. For every 100 females age 18 and over, there were 91.4 males.

The median income for a household in the town was $53,214, and the median income for a family was $63,333. Males had a median income of $36,875 versus $16,875 for females. The per capita income for the town was $38,626. There were 2.2% of families and 4.4% of the population living below the poverty line, including 3.2% of under eighteens and 8.3% of those over 64.

== Notable people ==
- La Tonya Johnson, Wisconsin state legislator
- Lucy Pickens, socialite "Queen of the Confederacy" born at a nearby plantation
- Daniel D. Stevens, Union Navy sailor and Medal of Honor recipient
- Franklin Cossitt, founder of La Grange, Illinois

== Gallery ==
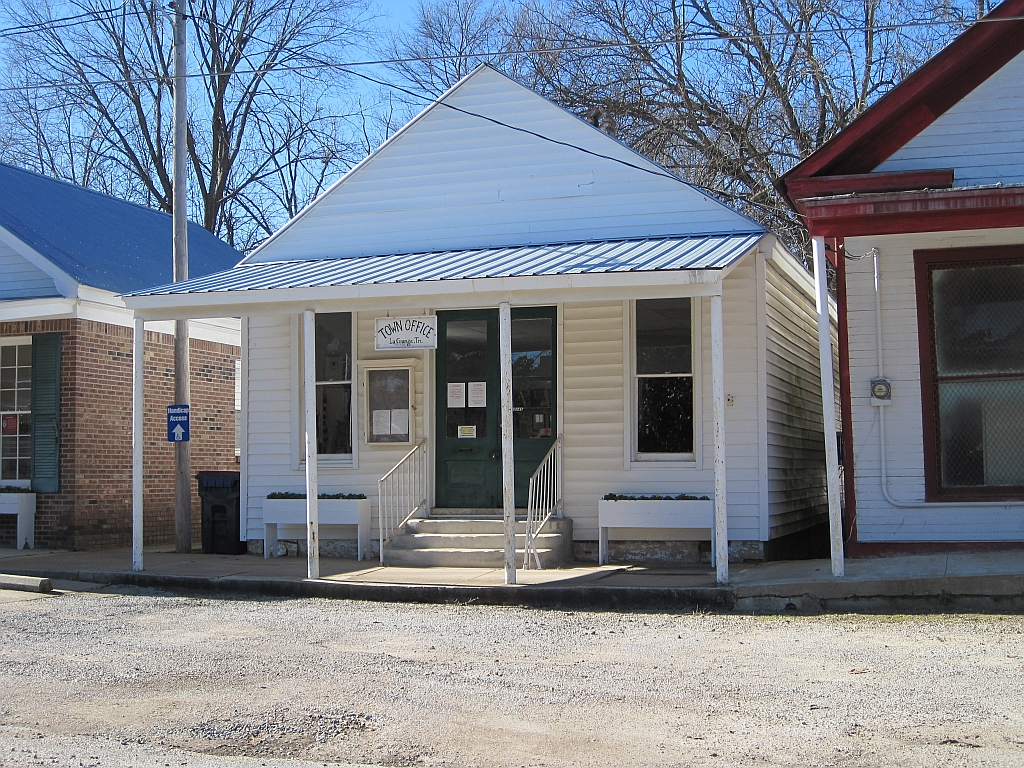

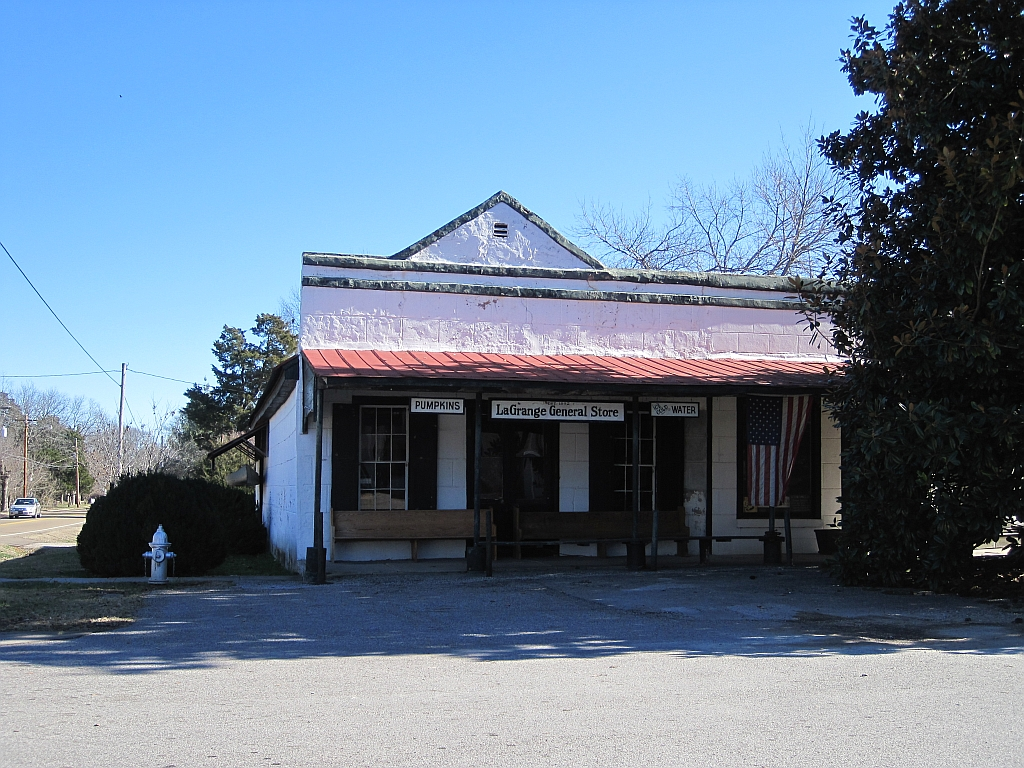

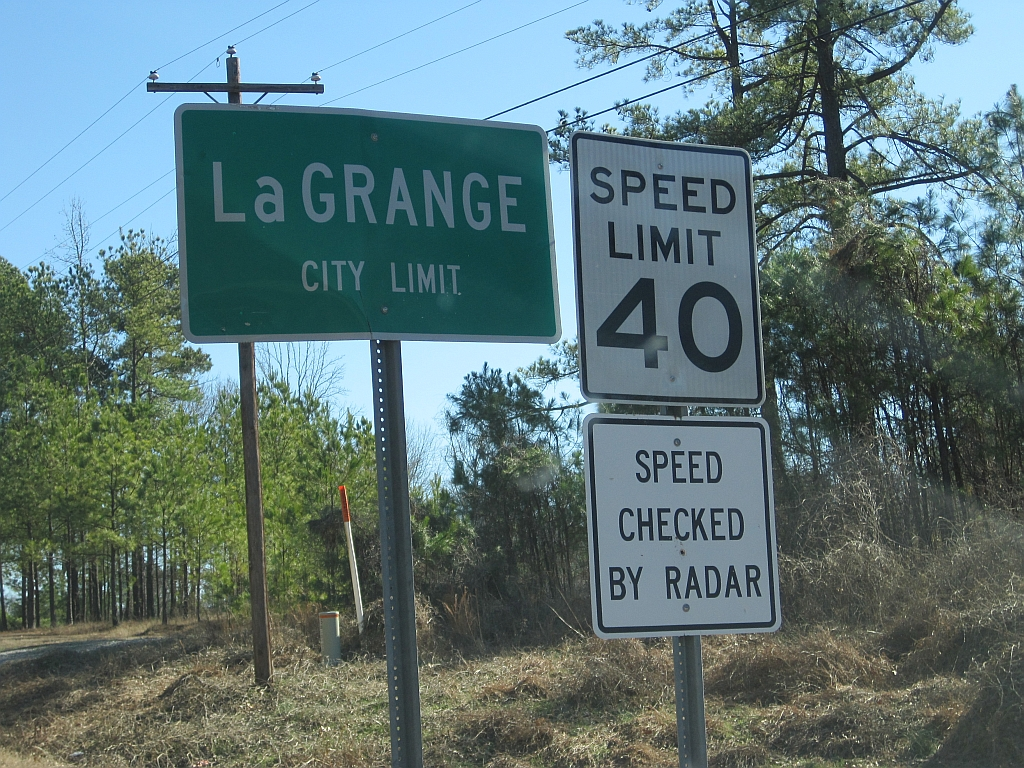

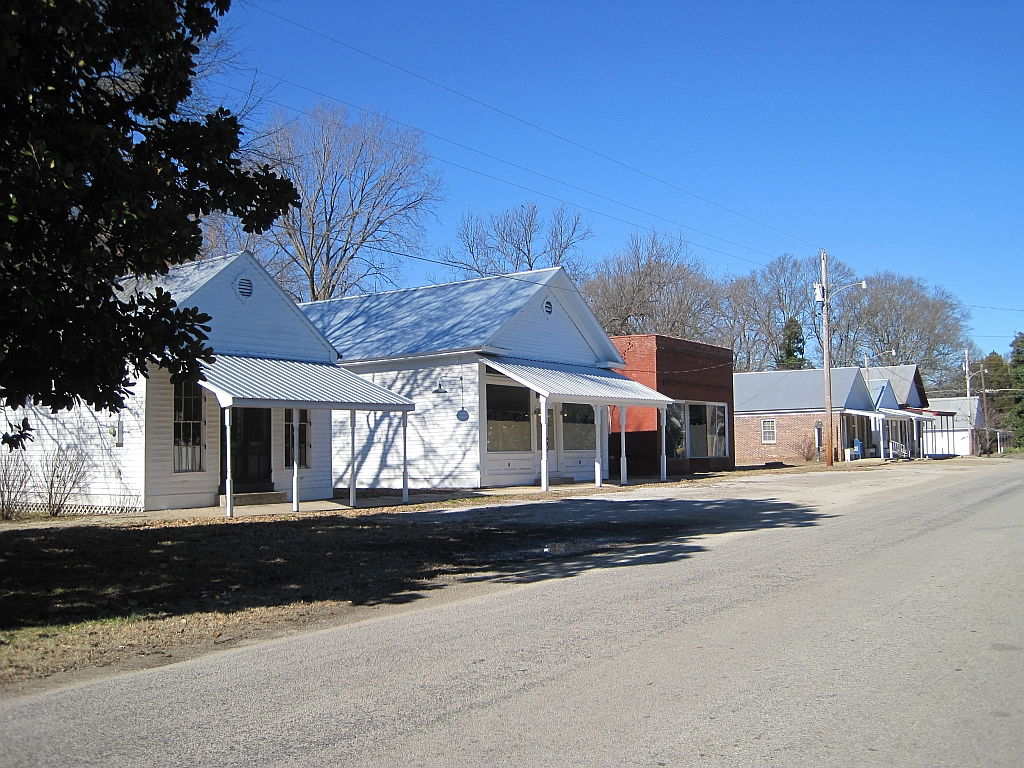

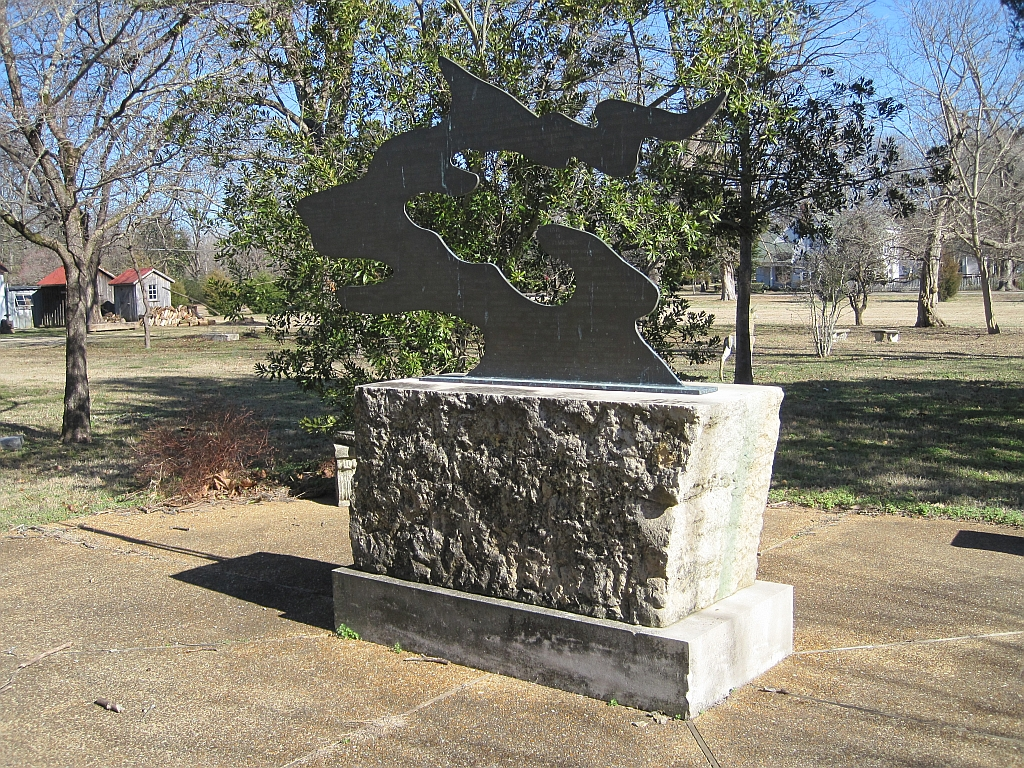

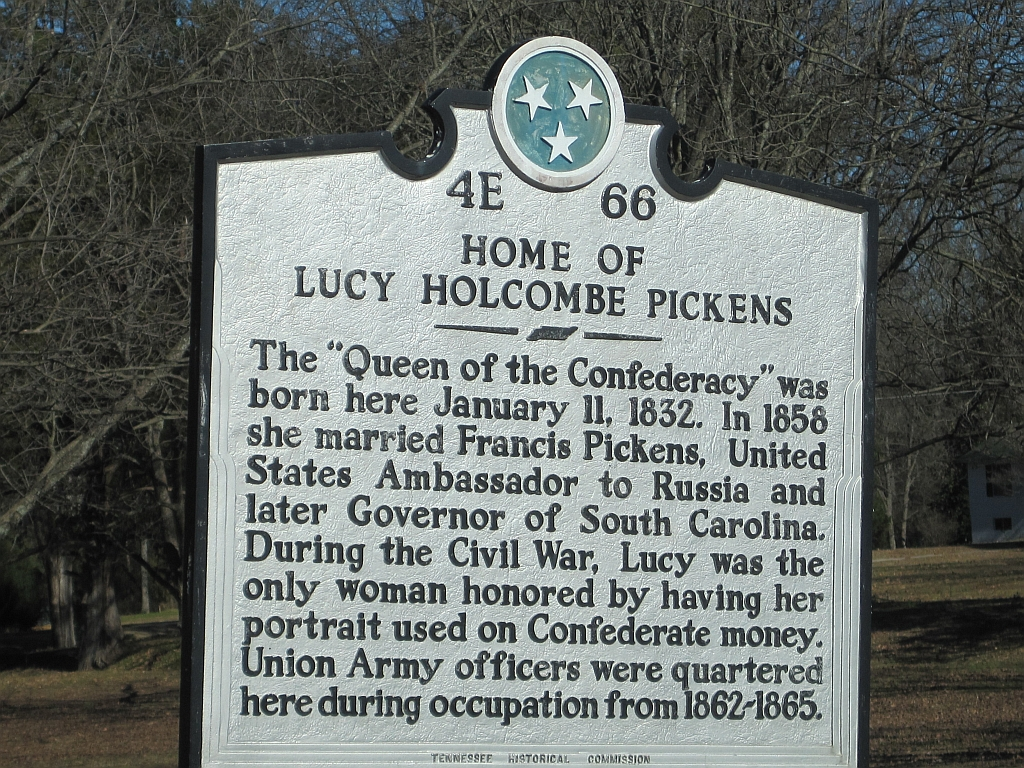

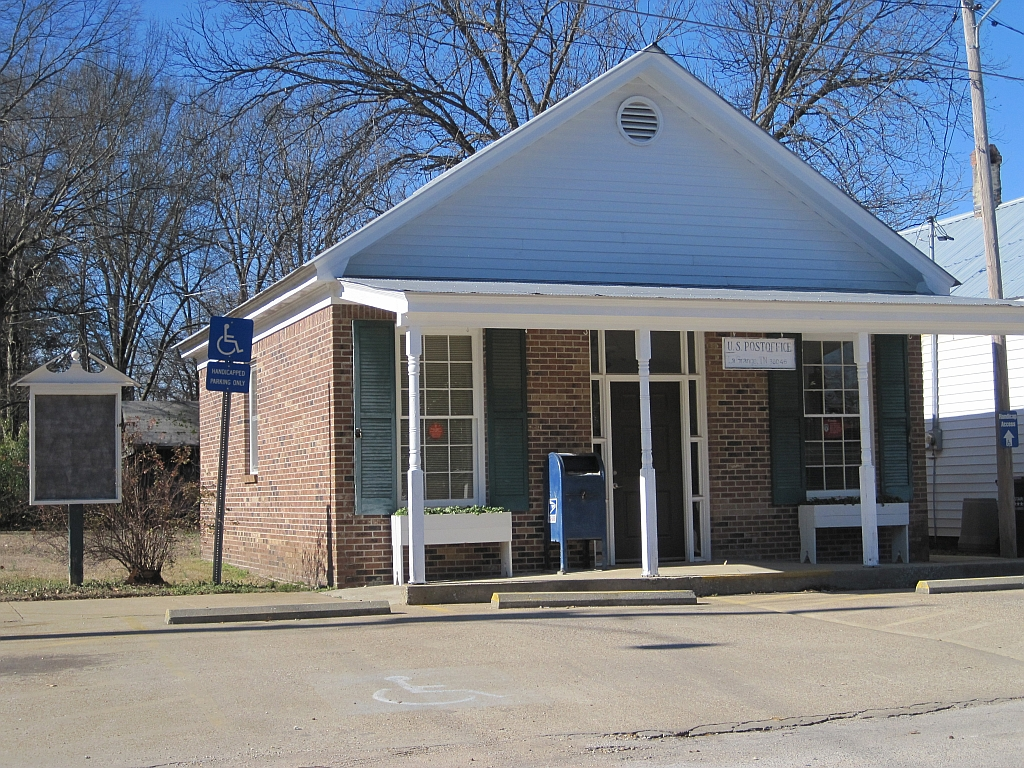
