= Hartford, Vermont =

- Town
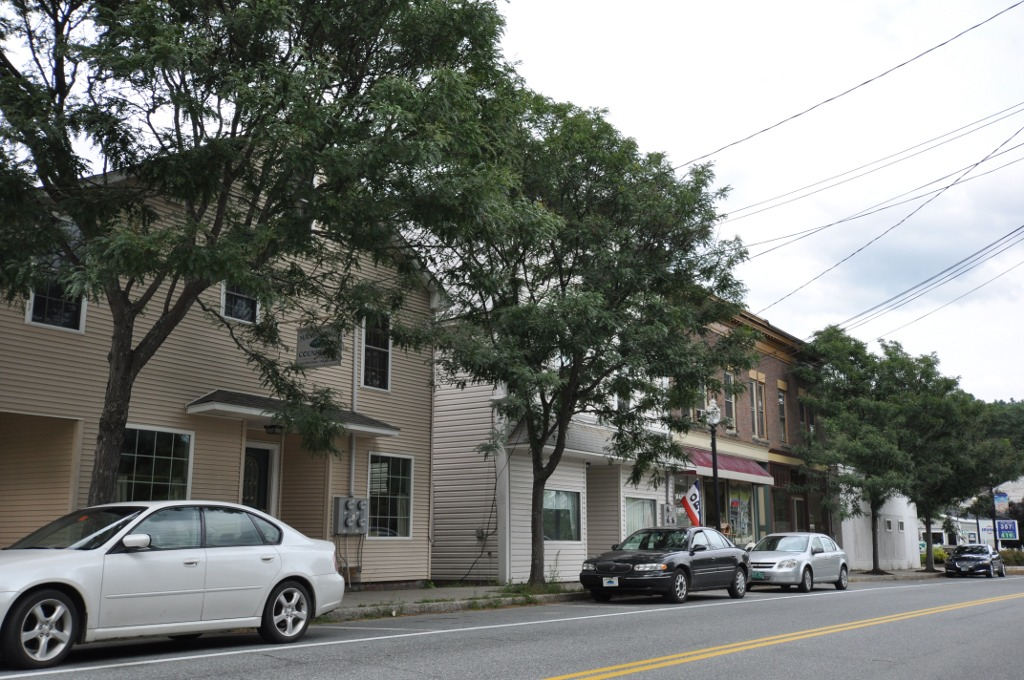

- Seal
- Interactive map of Hartford, Vermont
- Coordinates: 43°38′44″N 72°22′18″W
- Country: United States
- State: Vermont
- County: Windsor
- Chartered: 1761
- Communities: Hartford; Centertown; Deweys Mills; Quechee; Russtown; West Hartford; White River Junction; Wilder

Area
  - Total: 45.9 sq mi (118.9 km^{2})
  - Land: 45.0 sq mi (116.5 km^{2})
  - Water: 0.89 sq mi (2.3 km^{2})
- Elevation: 755 ft (230 m)

Population (2020)
  - Total: 10,686
  - Density: 237.6/sq mi (91.73/km^{2})
- Time zone: UTC−5 (Eastern (EST))
  - Summer (DST): UTC−4 (EDT)
- ZIP Codes: 05001, 05009 (White River Junction); 05047 (Hartford PO box); 05059 (Quechee); 05084 (West Hartford); 05088 (Wilder)
- Area code: 802
- FIPS code: 50-32275
- GNIS feature ID: 1462116
- Website: www.hartford-vt.org

Hartford is a town in Windsor County, Vermont, United States. It is on the New Hampshire border, at the intersection of Interstates 89 and 91. It is the site of the confluence of the White and Connecticut rivers; the Ottauquechee River also flows through the town. The town is composed of five unincorporated villages: Hartford, Quechee, West Hartford, White River Junction and Wilder. As of the 2020 census, the population was 10,686.

== History ==
The community was chartered by Governor Benning Wentworth of New Hampshire in 1761, and is named for Hartford, Connecticut.

On February 5, 1887, Hartford became the site of what remains Vermont's worst railway disaster when a Vermont Central Railroad train struck a broken rail on a bridge west of town. The ensuing derailment threw the train into the frozen river below, killing 37 and injuring 50.

== Geography ==
According to the United States Census Bureau, the town has a total area of 45.9 square miles (118.9 km^{2}), of which 45.0 square miles (116.5 km^{2}) is land and 0.89 square miles (2.3 km^{2}), or 1.93%, is water. The Appalachian Trail crosses the northwest corner of the town, passing through West Hartford.

== Demographics ==
Historical population
Census	Pop.	Note	%±
1790	988		—
1800	1,494		51.2%
1810	1,881		25.9%
1820	2,010		6.9%
1830	2,044		1.7%
1840	2,194		7.3%
1850	2,159		−1.6%
1860	2,396		11.0%
1870	2,480		3.5%
1880	2,954		19.1%
1890	3,740		26.6%
1900	3,817		2.1%
1910	4,197		10.0%
1920	4,739		12.9%
1930	4,888		3.1%
1940	4,978		1.8%
1950	5,827		17.1%
1960	6,355		9.1%
1970	6,477		1.9%
1980	7,963		22.9%
1990	9,404		18.1%
2000	10,367		10.2%
2010	9,952		−4.0%
2020	10,686		7.4%
U.S. Decennial Census

At the 2000 census there were 10,367 people in 4,509 households, including 2,800 families, in the town. The population density was 229.6 people per square mile (88.7/km^{2}). There were 5,493 housing units at an average density of 121.7 per square mile (47.0/km^{2}). The racial makeup of the town was 97.02% White, 0.55% African American, 0.31% Native American, 0.88% Asian, 0.03% Pacific Islander, 0.16% from other races, and 1.05% from two or more races. Hispanic or Latino of any race were 0.85%.

Of the 4,509 households 28.7% had children under the age of 18 living with them, 48.8% were married couples living together, 10.2% had a female householder with no husband present, and 37.9% were non-families. 30.6% of households were one person and 10.9% were one person aged 65 or older. The average household size was 2.28 and the average family size was 2.86.

The age distribution was 23.4% under the age of 18, 5.9% from 18 to 24, 29.3% from 25 to 44, 26.7% from 45 to 64, and 14.7% 65 or older. The median age was 40 years. For every 100 females, there were 89.9 males. For every 100 females age 18 and over, there were 86.9 males.

The median household income was $42,990 and the median family income was $51,286. Males had a median income of $35,969 versus $27,073 for females. The per capita income for the town was $22,792. About 5.3% of families and 8.5% of the population were below the poverty line, including 8.8% of those under age 18 and 4.9% of those age 65 or over.

== Notable people ==
- John L. Bacon, Chelsea and Hartford banker and Vermont State Treasurer
- Marion L. Bugbee, physician, suffragist, hospital administrator
- Daniel A. Dickinson, Minnesota Supreme Court justice
- Albert R. Hall, Minnesota and Wisconsin politician
- Phillips Lord, radio producer and motion picture actor
- Frank G. Mahady, Vermont attorney and judge who served on the Vermont Supreme Court
- Samuel E. Pingree, 40th Governor of Vermont
- Charles W. Porter, Secretary of State of Vermont
- William Strong, U.S. congressman
- Andrew Tracy (1797–1868), U.S. congressman
- Joseph Tracy, leading figure in the American Colonization Society
- Horace Wells, dentist and pioneering anesthesiologist
