= Roads in Nashville, Tennessee =

The roads in Nashville, Tennessee include Interstates 24, 65 and 40, with interchanges near the city center. There are nine U.S. highways serving the city. Two beltways surround Nashville.

== Interstates ==
Interstate highway	Additional information
I-24	A major west-east interstate that enters the Metro Nashville-Davidson County area near Joelton. It enters the city on its northern side, passes the east side of downtown, goes southeastward towards Antioch, and exits the city when reaching Rutherford County.
I-40	A major west-east interstate that enters the city's West End. The highway continues through downtown Nashville, and proceeds eastward through the eastern suburbs such as Hermitage, and bypasses Percy Priest Lake.
I-65	A major north-south interstate that enters downtown from southern suburbs such as Franklin and Brentwood. It passes downtown to the west and north, and exits the city through the northern suburb of Goodlettsville
I-440	The beltway on Nashville's south side from I-40 west of town to I-24 on the southeastern side, known as the Four-Forty Parkway.

== U.S. Highways ==
Route number	Local street name(s)
US 31	Eighth Avenue (South), Franklin Pike, Eighth Ave./Rosa L. Parks Blvd., James Robertson Parkway, Main Street
US 31A	Second Avenue (South), Fourth Avenue (South), Nolensville Pike
US 31E	Ellington Parkway, Gallatin Pike
US 31W	Spring Street, Dickerson Pike
US 41	Spring Street, Dickerson Pike, Main Street, James Robertson Parkway, Eighth Ave./Rosa L. Parks Blvd., Lafayette Street, Murfreesboro Pike
US 41A	Clarksville Pike, Rosa L. Parks Blvd., Eighth Avenue (North), Second Avenue (South), Fourth Avenue (South), Nolensville Pike
US 70	Charlotte Avenue, George L. Davis Blvd., 14th Avenue (North), Broadway, First Avenue (South), Hermitage Avenue, Lebanon Pike
US 70S	Memphis-Bristol Highway, West End Avenue, Rosa L. Parks Blvd. (South), Lafayette Street, Murfreesboro Pike
US 431	Hillsboro Pike, 21st Avenue (South), Broadway, Rosa L. Parks Blvd., James Robertson Parkway, Main Street, Spring Street, Dickerson Pike, West Trinity Lane, Whites Creek Pike

== State routes ==
Route number	Local street name(s)
SR 1 / SR 1 (Note: Secret, or hidden state highway designation associated with a U.S. Route.)	Charlotte Avenue, West End Avenue, Broadway, Lafayette Street, Murfreesboro Road
SR 6 / SR 6	Franklin Pike, Eight Avenue (South), James Robertson Parkway, Spring Street, Ellington Parkway, Gallatin Pike
SR 11 / SR 11	Nolensville Pike, Second Avenue (South), Fourth Avenue (South), Eighth Avenue/Rosa L. Parks Blvd, James Robertson Parkway, Spring Street, Dickerson Pike
SR 12 / SR 12	Ashland City Highway, Rosa L. Parks Blvd., Eighth Avenue (North)
SR 24 / SR 24	Charlotte Avenue, George L. Davis Blvd., 14th Avenue (North), Broadway, First Avenue (South), Hermitage Avenue, Lebanon Pike
SR 45	Old Hickory Boulevard
SR 65 / SR 65	West Trinity Lane, Whites Creek Pike
SR 100	Highway 100 West
SR 106	Hillsboro Pike
SR 112	Clarksville Pike
SR 155 / SR 155	Briley Parkway, Thompson Lane, Woodmont Blvd.
SR 171	Old Hickory Boulevard, Hobson Pike
SR 174	Long Hollow Pike
SR 251	River Road, Old Hickory Boulevard
SR 253	Concord Road
SR 254	Old Hickory Boulevard
SR 255	Harding Place, Donelson Pike
SR 265	Central Pike
SR 386	Vietnam Veterans Boulevard

== Notable streets ==
- Broadway
- Church Street
- James Robertson Parkway
- Jefferson Street
- Music Row
- Old Hickory Boulevard
- Printer's Alley

== See also ==
- Transportation in Nashville, Tennessee
- Tennessee Department of Transportation
- List of state routes in Tennessee
- List of numbered highways in Tennessee
