= Old Hickory Boulevard =

Historic road in Nashville, Tennessee

- Maintained by: TDOT
- Length: 69.1 mi (111.2 km)
- Component highways: SR 45; SR 171; SR 251; SR 254
- Location: Nashville, Tennessee (Davidson County)
- Major junctions: Incomplete loop around Nashville: I-24 in Whites Creek; I-65 in Madison; US 70 in Hermitage; I-40 in Hermitage; I-24 in Antioch; I-65 in Brentwood; I-40 in Bellevue; US 70 in Bellevue

Old Hickory Boulevard is a historic road that encircles Nashville, Tennessee, lying entirely within Davidson County. Originally the road, aided by ferries, formed a nearly unbroken loop around the city. Today, it is interrupted by a lake and several rerouted sections, which consist of roughly 69 miles (111 km). Just over half the distance–36.2 miles (58.3 km)–is part of several Tennessee state highways, including SR 45, SR 171, SR 251, and SR 254. Unsigned concurrencies exist very briefly along US 31E, US 41/US 70S, and SR 100.

== Route description ==
The road is named for President Andrew Jackson, who was nicknamed "Old Hickory." The road intersects with each of Interstates 24, 65, and 40 in the Nashville area twice, contributing to the misconception that there are many roads in Nashville using this name, rather than one broken ring around the city.

The route is effectively split into a northern half and a southern half by interruptions caused by the Cumberland River and the Stones River (via Percy Priest Lake). The section of Old Hickory Boulevard south of Hermitage to Antioch was interrupted by the creation of Percy Priest Lake and is now partially underwater. The gap created by the lake effectively merged the identity of Old Hickory Boulevard with Bell Road. The two are distinct, however, as traffic continues from Old Hickory Boulevard straight onto Bell Road along SR 254 at an intersection about 0.6 miles (0.97 km) east of Nolensville Pike (US 31A/US 41A). Bell Road continues eastward and later northeastward along SR 254 until the termination of SR 254 at Murfreesboro Pike (US 41/US 70S). Bell Road continues northward to Stewarts Ferry Pike and then crosses J. Percy Priest Dam before intersecting Old Hickory Boulevard in the southern part of Hermitage; this provides an unbroken link from the southern half to the northern half of Old Hickory Boulevard. Meanwhile, the signed route of Old Hickory Boulevard turns southward away from the SR 254/Bell Road alignment and weaves through neighborhoods before emerging along SR 171 and intersecting I-24 in southern part of Antioch near the Davidson–Rutherford county line. From there, it proceeds north-northeast toward Murfreesboro Pike (US 41/US 70S), splitting from SR 171 (which continues northward as Hobson Pike) and intersecting Murfreesboro Pike just south of the SR 171/Hobson Pike crossing. It continues northeastward and merges with Lavergne-Couchville Pike about one mile (1.6 km) later, continuing northeast to the Four Corners Recreation Area, near where the old route of the road enters what is now the lake. This is approximately 5.5 miles (8.9 km) south of the end of the northern segment at Cook's Landing.

West of Antioch, the southern segment continues along SR 254, intersecting all major north–south arteries extending south from Downtown Nashville through Brentwood and Forest Hills: Nolensville Pike (US 31A/US 41A), Edmonson Pike, I-65, Franklin Pike (US 31), Granny White Pike, and Hillsboro Pike (US 431). SR 254 terminates at Highway 100 near Warner Parks; Old Hickory Boulevard continues northward from Highway 100 after a brief concurrency. It intersects US 70S in Bellevue, where SR 251 becomes concurrent. The road continues northward to intersect I-40 and Charlotte Pike (US 70) before terminating at River Road Pike and Old Charlotte Pike in northern part of Bellevue. This is just south of the Cumberland River, approximately 2.3 miles (3.7 km) southwest of the end of the northern segment at Cleeces Ferry. A previous segment about two miles (3.2 km) to the northeast ran from Charlotte Pike (US 70) to the former Cleeces Ferry location on the south bank of the Cumberland River; this was renamed Annex Avenue after the ferry closed. Old Hickory Boulevard south of US 70 and the section to the northeast renamed Annex Avenue never aligned with each other.

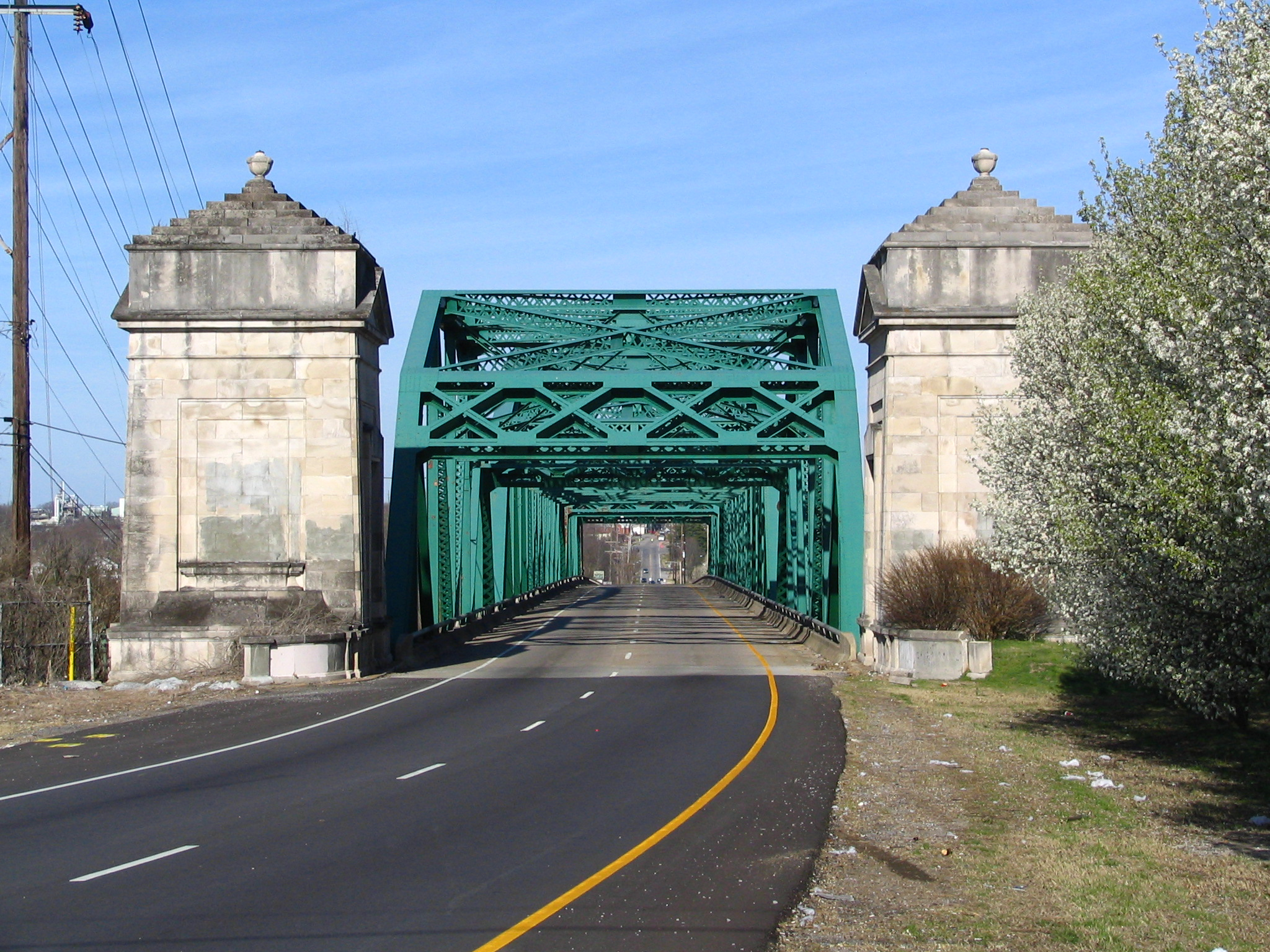
Old Hickory Bridge on Old Hickory Boulevard (SR 45), traversing the Cumberland River between Madison and Old Hickory

On the north side of the river, Old Hickory Boulevard terminates at the former Cleeces Ferry ramp, which is now a boat launch. From there, it traverses northward as a two-lane road through Bells Bend before intersecting Ashland City Highway (SR 12) in the Scottsboro area. Continuing northward, the route passes through the slightly rugged terrain of northwest Davidson County, intersecting Eatons Creek Road near Beaman Park and Clarksville Pike (US 41A) shortly afterward. Old Hickory Boulevard then turns eastward and southeastward as it weaves its way to the Whites Creek area, where it intersects Whites Creek Pike (US 431). SR 45 begins here and forms a concurrency with Old Hickory Boluvard. After serving as the southern terminus of Lickton Pike at Whites Creek High School, the road briefly becomes four-laned at the I-24 interchange. After passing Brick Church Pike and Dickerson Pike (US 41/US 31W), where SR 45 becomes permanently four-laned, the road has an interchange with I-65 and enters Madison. At the intersection with Gallatin Pike (US 31E), Old Hickory Boulevard leaves its concurrency with SR 45 and shifts one block south (SR 45 continues east simply as "SR 45"). It continues due east as a two-lane road along its original alignment through Madison before the designation jumps back to the adjacent SR 45 at the bridge across the Cumberland River. The original alignment becomes Sandhurst Drive at the river and turns sharply to the southwest (the former alignment intersected Sandhurst Drive before continuing across the bridge–this approximately 500-foot (150 m) segment was closed with the construction of the four-lane SR 45).

Entering Old Hickory, Old Hickory Boulevard leaves its concurrency with SR 45 once again, with the route continuing southeast as Robinson Road. The alignment of Old Hickory Boulevard follows Bridgeway Avenue before regaining designation at the intersection of Bridgeway Avenue and Swinging Bridge Road at the former DuPont plant. This segment continues southeastward to Donelson Avenue, where the designation ends. The alignment follows Hadley Avenue south to SR 45, where Robinson Road ends and Old Hickory Boulevard regains its designation and concurrency with SR 45. Continuing southeast, the road passes through Lakewood before turning south, passing The Hermitage estate. It enters the town of Hermitage, intersecting Lebanon Pike (US 70), Central Pike (SR 265), and I-40, which serves as the southern/eastern terminus of SR 45. Becoming two-laned again, it intersects Bell Road near Nashville Shores, then continues 400 yards (370 m) south to a boat ramp on Percy Priest Lake. Approximately 0.6 miles (0.97 km) south of the boat ramp, the route resumes near the lake at a dead end. It continues for 1.2 miles (1.9 km), intersecting Stewarts Ferry Pike before ending at another boat ramp at Cook's Landing.

== History ==
Old Hickory Boulevard formerly formed a near-complete loop around the city of Nashville. The creation of Percy Priest Lake interrupted the southeast portion of the highway, leaving a disjointed segment and eliminating approximately six miles (9.7 km) of the route. Major road projects combined with the gap created by the lake effectively merged the identity of Old Hickory Boulevard with Bell Road, with Bell Road now connecting the southern segment in western Antioch with the northern segment in southern Hermitage. One of the ferries used on the road, Cleeces Ferry, located on Bells Bend northeast of Bellevue, closed in 1990 after the opening of the Andrew B. Gibson Bridge on Tennessee State Route 155/Briley Parkway. In Madison, SR 45 was constructed with a four-lane segment just north of the old alignment. This resulted in Old Hickory Boulevard seemingly shifting a block south of SR 45 between Gallatin Pike (US 31E) and the Cumberland River, as the designation continues to follow the original alignment. Sandhurst Drive now serves as a continuation of the old alignment (when the designation of Old Hickory Boulevard jumps over to SR 45 at the river); it formerly terminated at Old Hickory Boulevard as the former alignment continued from Madison to the bridge, a segment that was closed and removed when the four-lane SR 45 was routed immediately north of the intersection.

== Major junctions ==
=== Northern segment ===
County	Location	mi	km	Destinations	Notes
Davidson	Nashville	0.0	0.0	Former site of Cleece's Ferry/Boat Ramp	Western terminus of northern segment
Davidson	Nashville	6.3	10.1	SR 12 / Ashland City Highway	
Davidson	Nashville	10.3	16.6	Eaton's Creek Road	
Davidson	Nashville	12.1	19.5	US 41A / Clarksville Pike	
Davidson	Whites Creek	15.5	24.9	US 431 / Whites Creek Pike	Western end of SR 45
Davidson	Nashville	17.5	28.2	I-24	I-24 exit 40
Davidson	Nashville	18.5	29.8	Brick Church Pike	
Davidson	Nashville	20.3	32.7	US 31W / US 41 / Dickerson Pike	
Davidson	Madison	21.4	34.4	I-65	I-65 exit 92
Davidson	Madison	22.8	36.7	US 31E / Gallatin Pike	Old Hickory splits from SR 45; continues south on US 31E
Davidson	Madison	22.9	36.9	E Old Hickory Blvd	Old Hickory splits from US 31E; continues east (one block south of SR 45)
Davidson	Madison	24.8	39.9	SR 45	Old Hickory continues as Sandhurst Drive; designation remerges with SR 45 (one block north) at Cumberland River
Davidson	Old Hickory	25.4	40.9	SR 45	Old Hickory continues along Bridgeway Ave; SR 45 continues as Robinson Rd.
Davidson	Old Hickory	26.0	41.8	Swinging Bridge Road	Old Hickory designation resumes; Bridgeway Ave ends
Davidson	Old Hickory	26.8	43.1	Donelson Avenue/Hadley Avenue	Old Hickory designation ends at Donelson Ave. in Old Hickory; travels south along Hadley Ave.
Davidson	Old Hickory	27.7	44.6	SR 45	Old Hickory designation resumes alongside SR 45 at SR 45/Hadley Dr. intersection
Davidson	Hermitage	32.0	51.5	US 70 / Lebanon Pike	
Davidson	Hermitage	34.0	54.7	SR 265 / Central Pike	Western terminus of SR 265; Central Pike continues westward
Davidson	Hermitage	34.3	55.2	I-40	I-40 exit 221; eastern/southern end of SR 45
Davidson	Hermitage	34.9	56.2	Bell Road	Access to J. Percy Priest Dam
Davidson	Hermitage	35.1	56.5	Percy Priest Lake/Boat Ramp	End of continuous segment; road sunken by Percy Priest Lake
Davidson	Hermitage	35.1	56.5	Approximately 0.6 miles (0.97 km) inundated by Percy Priest Lake	
Davidson	Hermitage	35.1	56.5	Old Hickory Boulevard	Dead end near Percy Priest Lake
Davidson	Hermitage	35.2	56.6	Stewarts Ferry Pike	
Davidson	Hermitage	36.3	58.4	Cook's Landing/Boat Ramp	Eastern terminus of northern segment; road sunken by Percy Priest Lake
1.000 mi = 1.609 km; 1.000 km = 0.621 mi: Concurrency terminus

=== Southern segment ===
County	Location	mi	km	Destinations	Notes
Davidson	Antioch	0.0	0.0	Lavergne-Couchville Pike/Hamilton Church Road	Eastern terminus of southern segment; Old Hickory travels along Lavergne-Couchville Pike
Davidson	Antioch	1.0	1.6	Lavergne-Couchville Pike	Old Hickory splits and regains designation
Davidson	Antioch	2.1	3.4	US 41 / US 70S / Murfreesboro Pike	Very brief concurrency
Davidson	Antioch	2.1	3.4	US 41 / US 70S / Murfreesboro Pike	
Davidson	Antioch	2.8	4.5	SR 171 / Hobson Pike	Southern end of Hobson Pike; Old Hickory becomes concurrent with SR 171
Davidson	Antioch	4.4	7.1	I-24	I-24 exit 62; southern terminus of SR 171
Davidson	Antioch	5.1	8.2	Burkitt Road	Old Hickory turns west; Burkitt Rd. continues south along the roadway
Davidson	Antioch	7.9	12.7	Pettus Road	Unsigned concurrency
Davidson	Antioch	8.1	13.0	Pettus Road	Unsigned concurrency
Davidson	Antioch	11.8	19.0	SR 254 / Bell Road	Western terminus of Bell Rd.; Old Hickory continues westward along SR 254
Davidson	Antioch	12.5	20.1	US 31A / US 41A / Nolensville Pike	
Davidson	Brentwood	14.5	23.3	Edmonson Pike	
Davidson	Brentwood	16.8	27.0	I-65	I-65 exit 74
Davidson	Brentwood	17.1	27.5	US 31 / Franklin Pike	
Davidson	Brentwood	18.8	30.3	Granny White Pike	
Davidson	Forest Hills	21.5	34.6	US 431 / Hillsboro Pike	
Davidson	Bellevue	27.7	44.6	SR 100	Western terminus of SR 254; Old Hickory unsigned along SR 100
Davidson	Bellevue	28.4	45.7	SR 100	Old Hickory resumes northward
Davidson	Bellevue	29.4	47.3	US 70S	Southern terminus of SR 251; Old Hickory continues northward along SR 251
Davidson	Bellevue	32.1	51.7	I-40	I-40 exit 199
Davidson	Bellevue	32.5	52.3	US 70 / Charlotte Pike	
Davidson	Bellevue	32.8	52.8	SR 251 / Old Charlotte Pike	Western terminus of southern segment; SR 251 continues northward as River Road Pike
1.000 mi = 1.609 km; 1.000 km = 0.621 mi: Concurrency terminus
