= Tennessee State Route 171 =

State highway in Tennessee, United States

State Route 171
- Old Hickory Blvd; Hobson Pike; South Mt. Juliet Road; North Mt. Juliet Road
- SR 171 highlighted in red

Route information
- Maintained by TDOT
- Length: 18.0 mi (29.0 km)

Major junctions
- South end: I-24 in Antioch
- US 41 / US 70S in Antioch; I-40 in Mount Juliet
- North end: US 70 in Mount Juliet

Location
- Country: United States
- State: Tennessee
- Counties: Davidson, Wilson

Highway system
- Tennessee State Routes; Interstate; US; State
← SR 170	→ SR 172

State Route 171 (SR 171) runs south–north through Davidson and Wilson counties in the state of Tennessee. It connects Interstate 24 to U.S. Route 70.

== Route description ==
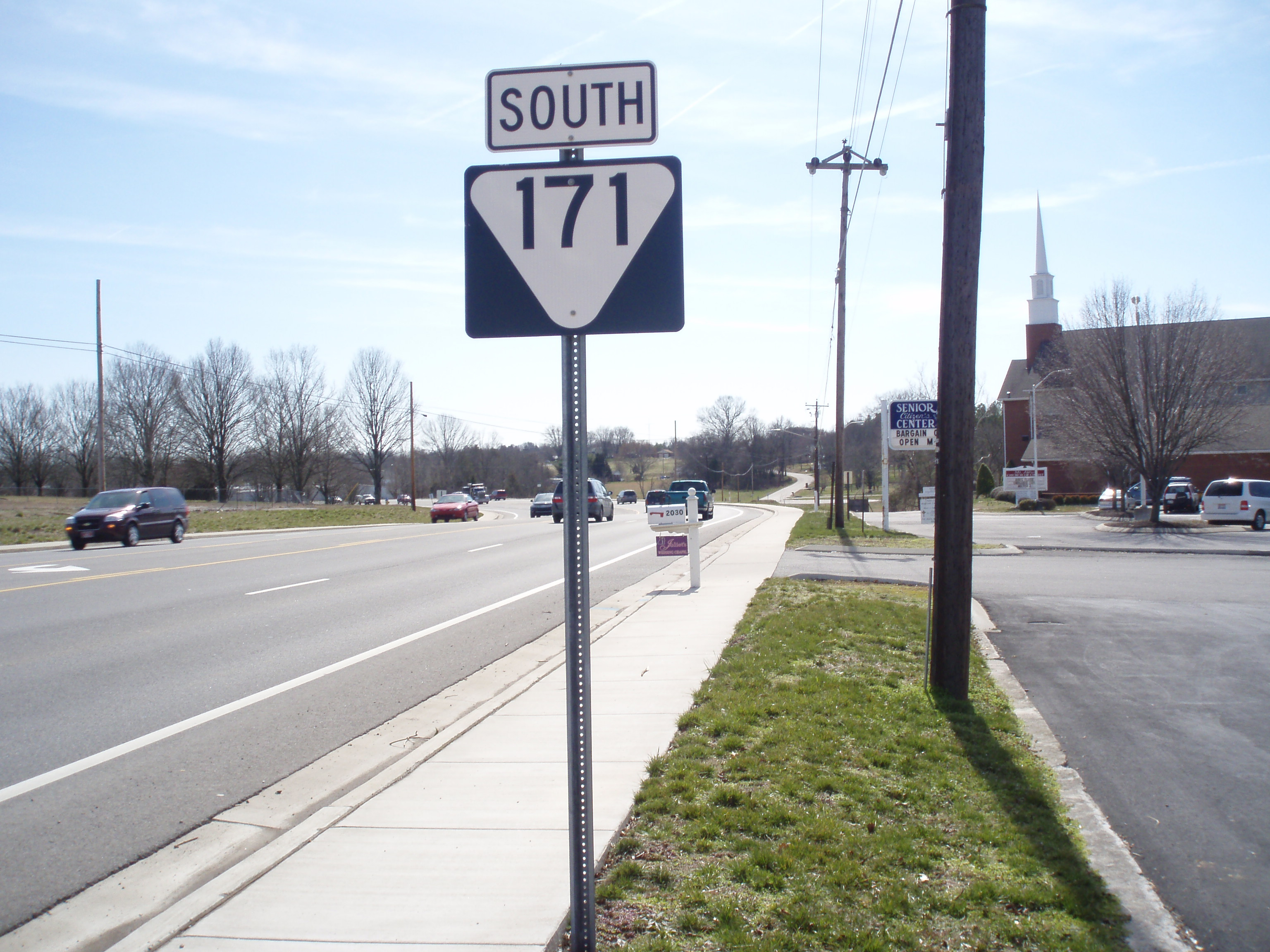
Tennessee State Route 171 in Mount Juliet.

=== Davidson County ===
SR 171 begins in Davidson County in Antioch at an interchange with I-24 (Exit 62) in a large industrial park. It goes north as a 2-lane highway to leave the industrial park and pass through residential (with light commercial) areas to have an intersection with US 41/US 70S/SR 1 (Murfreesboro Pike), where it passes by the former site of Starwood Amphitheatre, which was the Nashville area's premier outdoor music venue until it closed following the 2006 season, before it crosses Percy Priest Lake (Stones River). Once across the water, SR 171 travels through Long Hunter State Park for a short distance, before entering another residential area and crossing into Wilson County.

=== Wilson County ===
SR 171 continues north and passes through Rural Hill before entering Mount Juliet at its intersection with SR 265 (Central Pike). The highway almost immediately enters commercial areas and winds to a 4-lane undivided highway, and has an interchange with I-40 (Exit 226) soon afterwards. SR 171 continues north through some more residential areas before entering another commercial area, where it comes to an end at an intersection with US 70/SR 24 (Lebanon Road). Finally, the road ends in a dense commercial area, as it travels through the city of Mt. Juliet.

=== SR 171 has four names along its route ===
- Old Hickory Boulevard (I-24 to US 41/US 70S)
- Hobson Pike (US 41/US 70S to curve near Wilson/Davidson county line)
- South Mt. Juliet Road (Curve near Wilson/Davidson county line to I-40)
- North Mt. Juliet Road (I-40 to US 70)

== Major intersections ==
County	Location	mi	km	Destinations	Notes
Davidson	Antioch	0.0	0.0	I-24 – Nashville, Chattanooga	Southern terminus; I-24 exit 62
Davidson	Antioch			US 41 / US 70S (Murfreesboro Pike/SR 1) – Nashville, Murfreesboro	
Davidson				Percy Priest Bridge over J. Percy Priest Lake	
Wilson	Mount Juliet			SR 265 (Central Pike)	
Wilson	Mount Juliet			I-40 – Nashville, Knoxville	I-40 exit 226
Wilson	Mount Juliet	18.0	29.0	US 70 (Lebanon Road/SR 24) – Hermitage, Lebanon	Northern terminus of SR 171
1.000 mi = 1.609 km; 1.000 km = 0.621 mi

== See also ==
- List of Tennessee state highways
