= Tennessee State Route 265 =

Highway in Tennessee

State Route 265
- SR 265 highlighted in red

Route information
- Maintained by TDOT
- Length: 24.97 mi (40.19 km)
- Existed: July 1, 1983–present

Major junctions
- West end: SR 45 at Hermitage
- I-840 / SR 109 at Lebanon; US 231 at Bairds Mill
- East end: US 70 near Watertown

Location
- Country: United States
- State: Tennessee
- Counties: Davidson, Wilson

Highway system
- Tennessee State Routes; Interstate; US; State
← SR 264	→ SR 266

State Route 265 (SR 265) is a state highway in Davidson and Wilson counties in Middle Tennessee. It runs from SR 45 in Hermitage, through middle Tennessee to its eastern terminus at US Route 70 (US 70) outside of Watertown.

For most of its route, SR 265 is known as Central Pike.

== Route description ==
Central Pike begins in Davidson County in Hermitage at an intersection with US 70/SR 24 (Lebanon Pike), adjacent to US 70's crossing of the Stones River. It then goes southeasterly as a two-lane road through several neighborhoods before an intersection with SR 45 (Old Hickory Boulevard), just north of its interchange with Interstate 40 (I-40, exit 221). Here, SR 265 begins and follows Central Pike eastward before leaving Hermitage and going through farmland, where it parallels I-40 for several miles before crossing into Wilson County.

SR 265 then crosses over I-40 and starts to head southeasterly again before an intersection with SR 171 on the very southern edge of Mount Juliet. SR 265 then winds its way east through farmland to Gladeville, where it has a very short concurrency with SR 109 just prior to an interchange with I-840 (exit 72). SR 265 then curves southeastward again and winds its way through more farmland before coming to an intersection with US 231/SR 10 just south of Lebanon in Bairds Mill, where SR 265 changes names from Central Pike to Chicken Road before passing just north of Cedars of Lebanon State Park. The highway then goes through more wooded areas as it continues east to an intersection with SR 266, where it changes designations from Chicken Road to Trammel Lane. The highway then continues eastward, where it comes to an end at US 70/SR 26 just northwest of Watertown.

== Major intersections ==
County	Location	mi	km	Destinations	Notes
Davidson	Hermitage	0.0	0.0	SR 45 (Old Hickory Boulevard) to I-40 – Lakewood, Old Hickory	Western terminus of SR 265; Central Pike continues westward to US 70/SR 24
Wilson	Mount Juliet	5.4	8.7	SR 171 (S. Mt. Juliet Road) – Antioch, Mount Juliet	
Wilson	Lebanon	12.3	19.8	SR 109 north – Lebanon	Western end of SR 109 concurrency
Wilson	Lebanon	12.6	20.3	I-840 – Chattanooga, Knoxville SR 109 ends	I-840 exit 72; southern terminus of SR 109
Wilson	Bairds Mill	16.9	27.2	US 231 (Murfreesboro Road/SR 10) – Murfreesboro, Lebanon	Provides access to Cedars of Lebanon State Park
Wilson		22.3	35.9	SR 266 (Cainsville Road) – Lebanon, Norene	
Wilson		24.97	40.19	US 70 (Sparta Pike/SR 26) – Lebanon, Watertown	Eastern terminus
1.000 mi = 1.609 km; 1.000 km = 0.621 mi: Concurrency terminus
