= Madison, Tennessee =

- Neighborhood
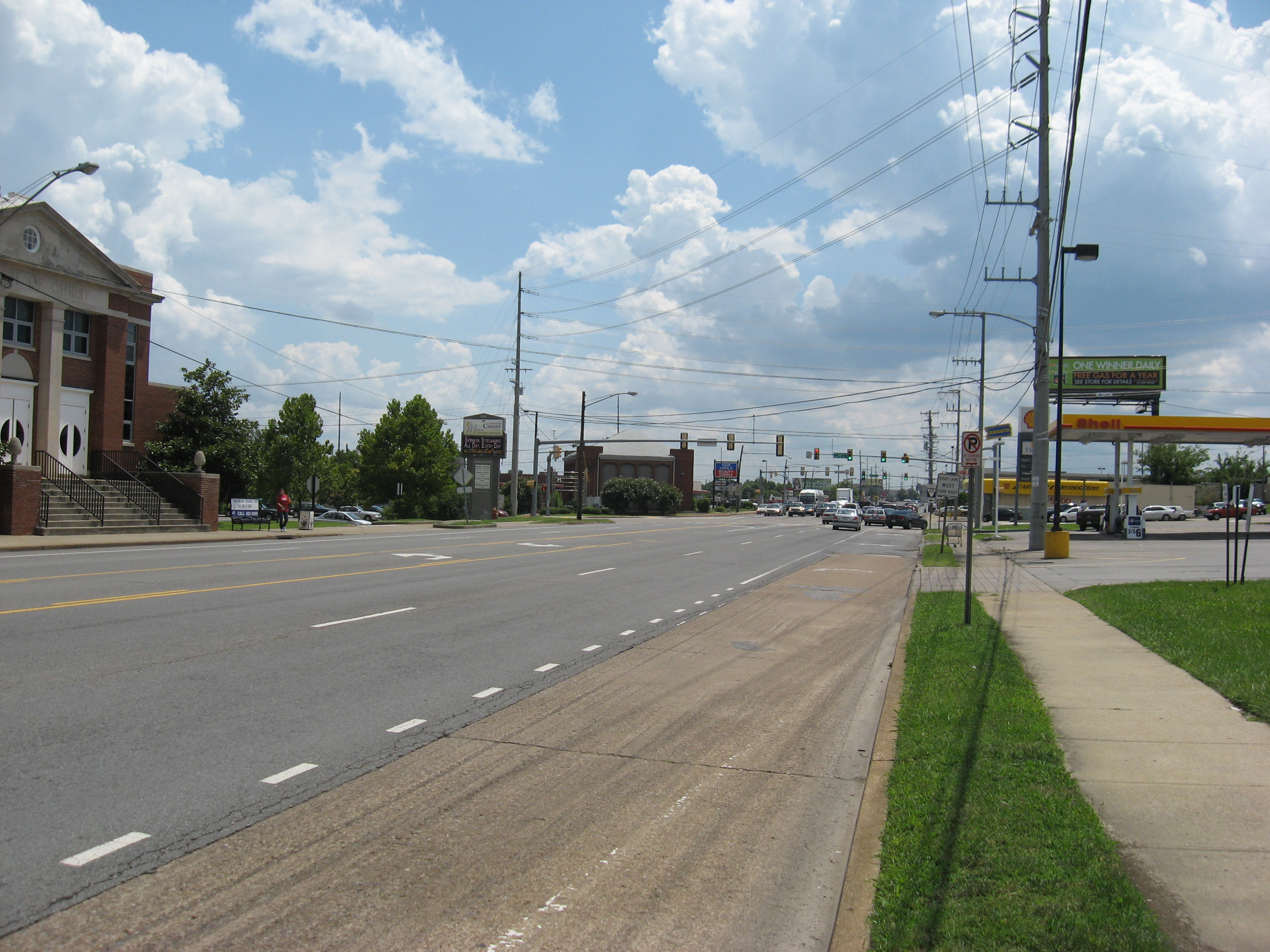
- Downtown Madison

- Location within Tennessee Location within the United States
- Coordinates: 36°15′22″N 86°42′50″W
- Country: United States
- State: Tennessee
- County: Davidson
- City: Nashville
- Elevation: 482 ft (147 m)
- Time zone: UTC-6 (Central (CST))
  - Summer (DST): UTC-5 (CDT)
- Zip code: 37115, 37116
- Area code: 615
- GNIS feature ID: 1292483

Madison (originally Madison Station) is a former settlement, now a suburban neighborhood of northeast Nashville, in the U.S. state of Tennessee. It is incorporated as part of the Metropolitan Government of Nashville and Davidson County.

The population of Madison's 37115 zip code as of the US Census Bureau 2016 estimates was 40,146.

== Location ==
Madison is only 8.2 miles north at its closest point to downtown Nashville. Ellington Parkway serves as a direct connection from downtown Madison to downtown Nashville with exits to Inglewood and East Nashville. Madison is located close to major highways and parkways: 65, 40, 24, Briley and local access roads St. Route 45 (Old Hickory) and Dickerson Road. It begins at Briley Parkway and extends to the Hendersonville line in Rivergate, from Dickerson Road to the Cumberland River.

Madison is one of 14 Community Plan areas in the Metro Nashville-Davidson County area for which zoning and land use planning is done. The 2015-updated Community Plan for Madison, an 89-page document adopted by the Metropolitan Planning Commission, was updated in 2015 as part of NashvilleNext's long-term planning.

Madison has two major centers: Downtown Madison and Rivergate. The area between the two centers is called Motor Mile. Madison services several surrounding communities: East Nashville, Inglewood, Whites Creek, Joelton, Old Hickory, Hendersonville, Hermitage and more.

Madison is one of about 26 suburban neighborhoods of Nashville.

== History ==
Madison Station post office was opened in 1857, when Madison Station was about eight miles from Nashville proper, roughly halfway between Nashville and Goodlettsville. In the 20th century, Madison acted as a connecting suburb until being annexed into Nashville in 1963 due to the consolidation with Davidson County. Madison funnels traffic to Goodlettsville, Hendersonville, Gallatin, Inglewood, and downtown Nashville.

Old Hickory Boulevard (State Route 45) is a section of the Trail of Tears, the route of the forced removal of Cherokee Indians from North Carolina to Oklahoma, directed by U.S. President Andrew Jackson. This route passes directly by Jackson's estate, The Hermitage, in the neighboring community of Old Hickory, Tennessee.

Madison was once home to the "Hillbilly Day" festival. This festival was created as a fundraiser to benefit schools within the area. This fundraising festival included costumes, school events, and a parade. Madison's first "Hillbilly Day" was in 1952.

Madison is also home to Amqui train station that was built by the Louisville and Nashville Railroad and serviced by the company until 1979. After L&N Railroad vacated the station, country musician Johnny Cash purchased it and moved it from Madison to his home in nearby Sumner County. The station was later returned to Madison after the deaths of Cash and his wife June Carter Cash. As of 2016, it housed a museum and visitor center for the neighborhood.

On December 9, 2023, a significant and deadly tornado tore across the northern Nashville metro, killing 3 people. Madison was among the hardest hit during the event. A substation was hit in the area by the tornado, causing a massive explosion and fireball that went viral on social media.

== Education ==
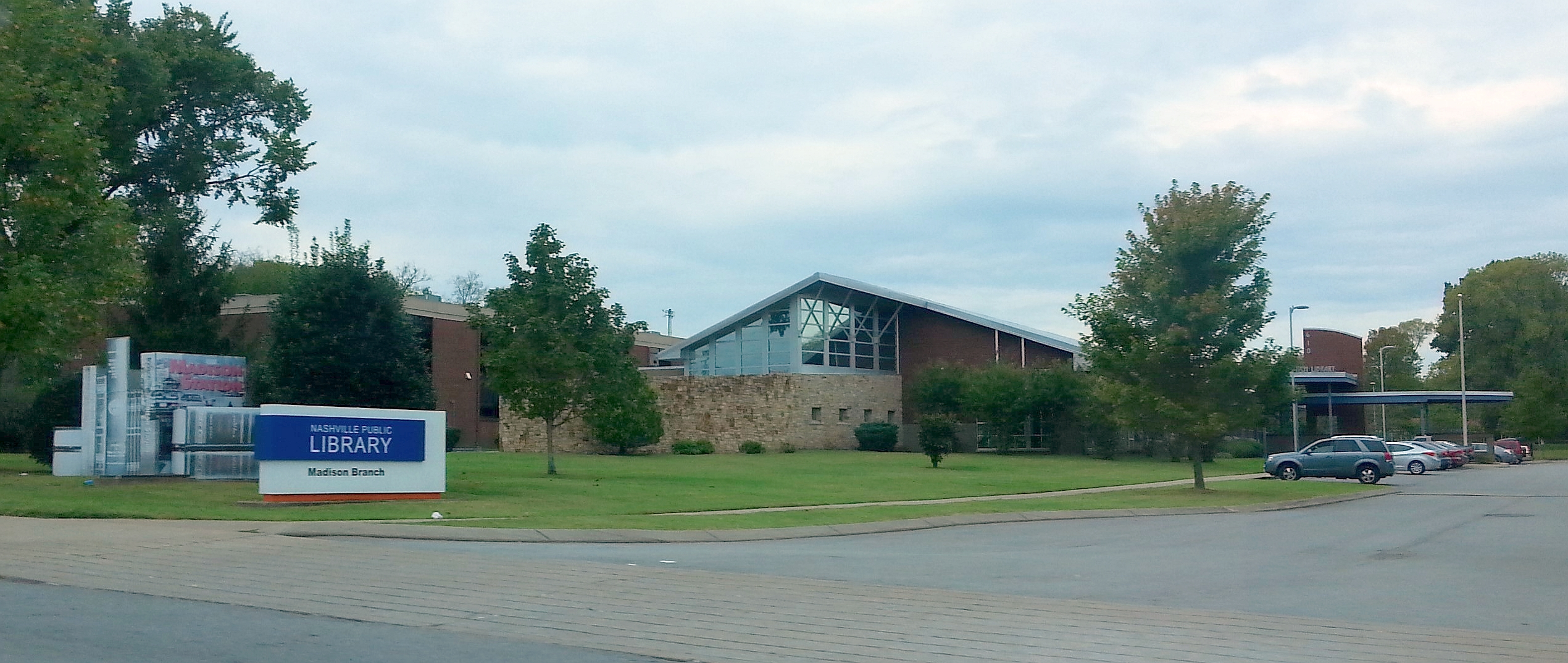
The Madison Branch Library

Public education in Madison falls under the supervision of Metropolitan Nashville Public Schools. Zoned schools in the Madison area send students through the Hunters Lane cluster, named after the area high school, Hunters Lane High School. Prior to the opening of Hunter's Lane, the public high school for the area was Madison High School, which is now Madison Middle Prep. Three private schools are also located within Madison: Goodpasture Christian School, Madison Academy and Saint Joseph School.

== Recreation ==
Three public parks are within Madison: Madison Park is located in the center of State Route 45, Delaware Avenue, and North Dupont Avenue. Peeler Park is located off of Neelys Bend Road at the end of Overton Road. Cedar Hill Park is located at the corner of Old Hickory Boulevard and Dickerson Pike.

Another source of recreation for the Madison community is Rivergate Mall, which is located at the corner of Conference Drive and Gallatin Pike North. This mall houses over 130 different stores, including mainstream department stores.

The Madison Branch Library opened in 1977, and is part of the Nashville Public Library. A new facility, themed after the book The Lion, the Witch and the Wardrobe, opened in 2000. Meeting rooms, group study rooms, and public computers are available.

== Transportation ==
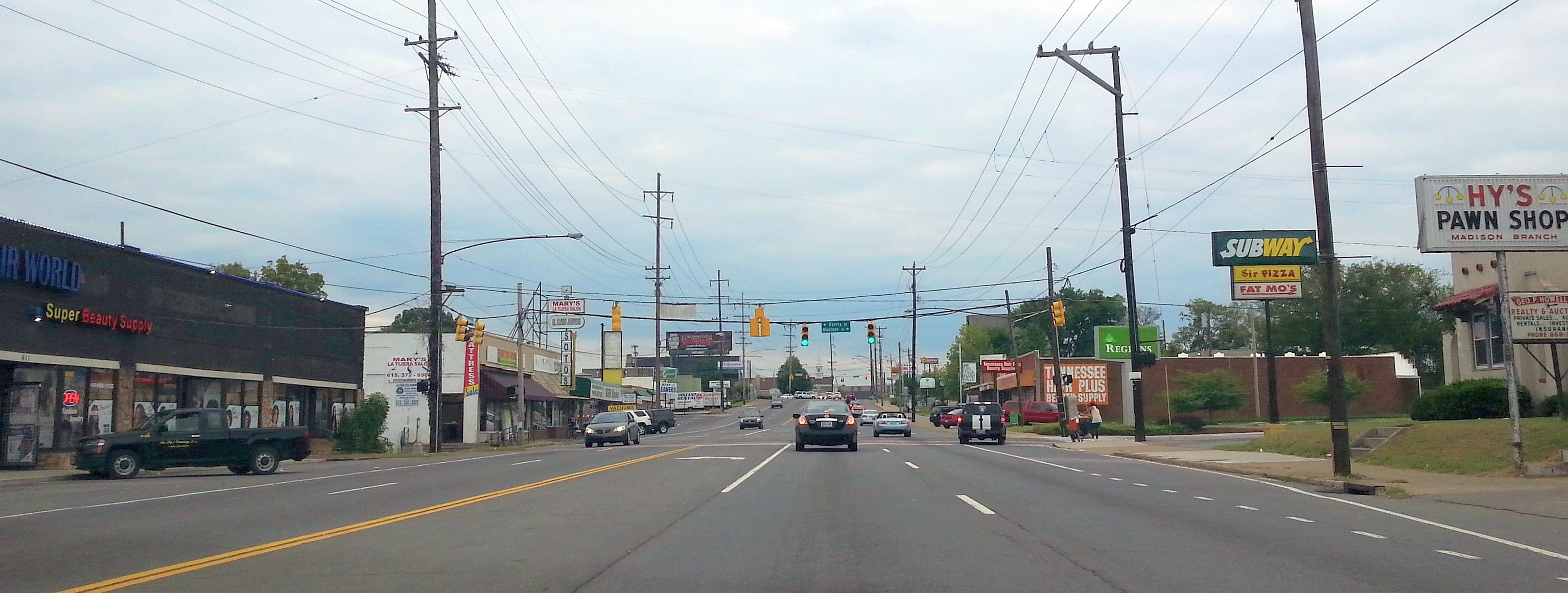
Downtown Madison, Tennessee

Madison is a unique town in Nashville because of its easy accessibility via several major roads and interstates.

Major roads running through Madison are Old Hickory Boulevard (State Rt. 45) and Gallatin Pike (U.S. Route 31E). Dickerson Road runs along the west border of Madison. Briley Parkway (State Route 155), with easy access to Interstates 24 and 40, runs along the south border of Madison. Interstate 65 has two main exits into Madison, one at Old Hickory Blvd, and the other at Rivergate shopping area. Ellington Parkway connects downtown Nashville to downtown Madison with exits along the way to key areas of East Nashville and Inglewood. Vietnam Vets Parkway is accessible off Conference Drive directly off Gallatin which links Madison and Goodletsville to Hendersonville and Gallatin.

Madison is on the rapid transit Metro bus lines. Madison boasts extensive walkability with several miles of sidewalks. Bike lanes were added in some of the newer asphalt in Madison and plans have been made to build a pedestrian and bike extension from Peeler Park to Stones River Park, which will connect Peeler key greenways leading to downtown Nashville.

== Cemeteries ==
Madison is the location of the Nashville National Cemetery. The Nashville National Cemetery covers around 64 acres and holds nearly 33,000 veterans as well as their spouses, and dependents. According to the National Park Service, the entrance to the cemetery is marked by a monumental arch which is, "one of five in the national cemetery system." It and Spring Hill Cemetery, across Gallatin Pike, delineated the generally accepted boundary between Madison and Inglewood prior to the construction of nearby Briley Parkway.

== Population ==
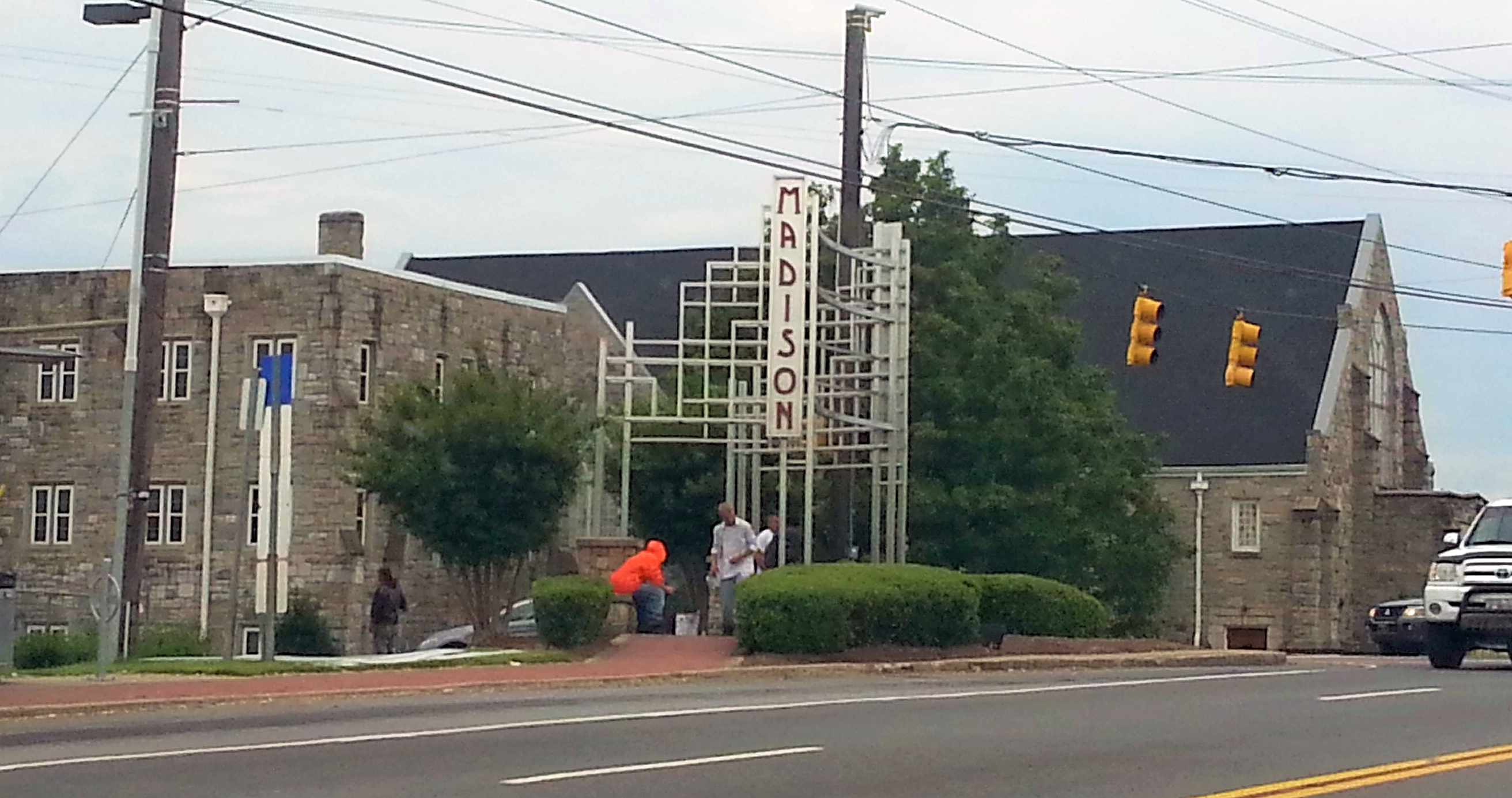
Sign located near the downtown Madison area

The population in Madison, as of 2020, was 41,723. The total number of households was 17,024. Average household income was $59,429.

However, because Madison features two major centers, Downtown Madison and Rivergate, the demographic study includes several surrounding communities in addition to the population information for Madison only.

== Notable people ==
Notable residents that were born or reside in Madison, Tennessee include :

- William S. Harney (1800–1889), Union general, born in Madison
- Tom Willett (born 1938), convicted child molester, actor, record producer, singer-songwriter, and YouTuber, resides in Madison (originally from Chenaultt, Kentucky)
- Patrick Turner, former football player for the New York Jets and Miami Dolphins.
- Jim Reeves, (1923–1964), U.S. country singer, lived at 400 Westchester Drive from 1958 until his death in 1964
- Patsy Cline, country singer (September 8, 1932 – March 5, 1963)
- R. Stevie Moore, (born 1952), DIY musician & singer-songwriter
