= Madison Academy =

Madison Academy can refer to several things:

- Madison Academy (Alabama), a private co-educational school in Madison, Alabama, USA, affiliated with the churches of Christ.
- Madison Academy (Michigan) a charter school.
- Madison Academy (Tennessee), a private co-educational school in Madison, Tennessee, USA, affiliated with the Seventh-Day Adventist Church
