= Starwood Amphitheatre =

Music venue in Nashville, Tennessee, US

Coordinates: 36°02′18.2″N 86°36′24.89″W

- Defunct logo for venue, 2004-06

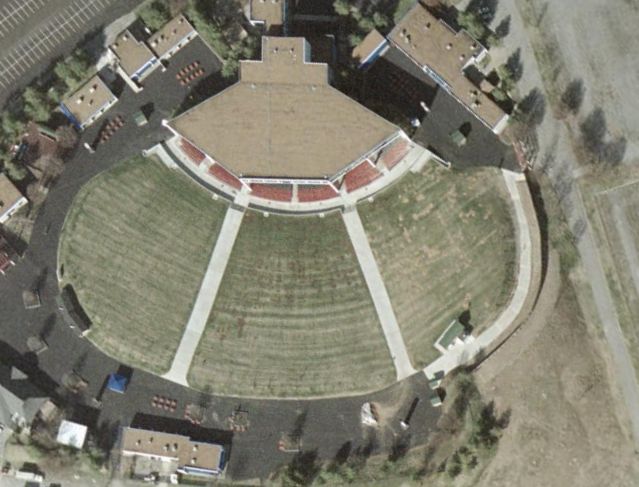
- Aerial view of venue (c.2007)
- Former names: Starwood Amphitheatre (1985-98; 2004-07); First American Music Center (1999); AmSouth Amphitheatre (2000-04)
- Address: 3839 Murfreesboro Pike; Nashville, TN 37013-2215
- Location: Antioch
- Owner: Live Nation
- Capacity: 17,137

Construction
- Groundbreaking: November 11, 1985
- Opened: June 20, 1986
- Closed: October 21, 2006
- Demolished: September 27, 2007
- Cost: $7.8 million ($23.3 million in 2025 dollars)

The Starwood Amphitheatre was the primary outdoor music venue in the Nashville, Tennessee area from 1986 to 2006. It was owned by Live Nation and had a capacity of 17,137. It had previously been owned by SFX Entertainment and Clear Channel Worldwide, both predecessors of Live Nation Entertainment. It was demolished in 2007 and the site, as of 2021, has not yet been redeveloped. It was not affiliated with the now-defunct Starwood hospitality company.

== Background ==
The venue was the idea of Steve Moore, former CEO of the Country Music Association. Moore began working for PACE Concerts, in Houston booking acts for AstroWorld and Six Flags Over Texas. In 1985, Moore moved to Nashville in hopes of opening a venue tailored to acts like The Beach Boys, Jimmy Buffett, the Coral Reefer Band and the Eagles.

The amphitheater broke ground November 11, 1985. In June 1986, the amphitheater opened as Nashville's premier outdoor venue.

== Venue information ==
Located in the Nashville suburb of Antioch, the amphitheatre featured one large stage, a covered pavilion with reserved box seating, and an open-air grassy area for general admission seating. A much smaller stage was located near the venue's north entrance and usually featured local bands entertaining audiences as they entered the venue. For larger music festivals, a temporary third stage would be erected in a fenced area normally used as a parking lot.

Starwood regularly hosted most of Nashville's summer concerts featuring A-list artists from all genres of music. The typical season, which generally ran from April to October, featured 20 to 25 events.

Starwood was criticized for the lack of sufficient road infrastructure in the area. Though within two miles (3 km) of Interstate 24, Starwood was located along Tennessee State Route 171 (Old Hickory Blvd), a two-lane road in a primarily residential and industrial neighborhood. It was also located along U.S. Route 41 (Murfreesboro Road), a four-lane highway that does not intersect a freeway in the immediate area. Therefore, larger crowds would result in major traffic problems both before and after events. Event attendees often faced hours before and after events waiting in the traffic on the two lane road location of the main venue entrance.

Aggressive security policies, such as preventing any consumption of alcohol in the parking lots before concerts, led to many concert-goers boycotting the venue through the 1990s and up to the time of its closure.

== Naming rights ==
AmSouth Amphitheatre logo, 2000–2003

After opening as Starwood Amphitheatre in 1986, the venue went through several name changes in its later years. Prior to the 1999 season, naming rights were sold to locally based First American National Bank for five years, and the venue was renamed First American Music Center. That October, First American National Bank merged into Alabama-based AmSouth Bancorporation. AmSouth agreed to assume the naming rights upon the merger, and after just one season with its new name, the venue was renamed AmSouth Amphitheatre in 2000. AmSouth declined to extend the naming rights agreement past the initial five-year deal, and without a new suitor, the venue reverted to its original name in 2004.

== Closing ==
On February 13, 2007, Live Nation announced its intention to close Starwood Amphitheatre and cancel the 2007 season in anticipation of a potential sale.

Entertainment industry insiders blame the closing on Starwood's age and size, calling it a "first-generation" outdoor venue that was only about two-thirds the size of the ones being built at the time of its closing and one that lacked now-standard amenities for both patrons and performers, and therefore not able to attract the top-tier artists who demand larger, more modern performance venues.

Starwood grossed only $4.6 million in ticket sales during the 2006 season and was one of four underperforming venues that Live Nation put up for sale following the season. Only two events were scheduled for 2007 before the announcement to close the venue: The Charlie Daniels Band's annual Volunteer Jam, and a Brad Paisley/Kellie Pickler show.

The last show at Starwood featured Aerosmith and Mötley Crüe, two bands who had played there many times over the years.

== Demolition and beyond ==
The Starwood offices and concession areas were demolished during the last half of September 2007, culminating with the dynamite demolition of the stage, seating area, and dressing rooms on September 29, 2007.

Live Nation announced on April 30, 2007 that the buyer of the Starwood property was Vastland Realty Group. Plans for the site were revealed the following November, when Vastland announced a $100 million mixed-use residential and commercial development named "Starwood Commons" that would feature 350,000 square feet (33,000 m^{2}) of retail space and 250 multi-level townhomes.

More than three years later, the site had not been cleared, and the landscape remained much the same as it did following demolition of the structures. In October 2010, the then-current owner of the site petitioned to allow live concerts on the site, as the original development plans had fallen through due in part to the late-2000s recession.

In December 2010, Nashville rock band August Christopher performed on the still-standing concrete stage, shooting a music video for their song "Down", which was nominated for NIMA's (Nashville Independent Musicians' Association) "Video of the Year". Years later, the band got retroactive permission from Vastland Realty in response to a documentary titled "All or Nothing".

Real estate developer Vastland Realty announced plans to return concerts to the site beginning as soon as Summer 2011 using a temporary stage and seating, but the plans never came to fruition.

After defaulting on the loan, Vastland Realty lost the property to foreclosure. It was purchased out of foreclosure by Orange Murfreesboro, LLC in 2013 for US$5.5 million.

== See also ==
- List of contemporary amphitheatres
