= Tennessee State Route 45 =

State highway in Tennessee, United States

State Route 45
- Robinson Road; Hadley Avenue; Old Hickory Boulevard
- SR 45 mainline in red

Route information
- Maintained by TDOT
- Length: 17.92 mi (28.84 km)
- Existed: October 1, 1923–present

Major junctions
- West end: US 431 in Whites Creek
- I-24 in Nashville; US 31W / US 41 in Nashville; I-65 in Nashville; US 31E in Madison; US 70 in Hermitage
- East end: I-40 in Hermitage

Location
- Country: United States
- State: Tennessee
- Counties: Davidson

Highway system
- Tennessee State Routes; Interstate; US; State
← US 45W	→ SR 46

State Route 45 (SR 45) is a west–east route in Davidson County, Tennessee. It connects US 431 (Whites Creek Pike) in Whites Creek with I-40 in Hermitage.

== Route description ==
SR 45 makes up much of the northern half of Nashville's Old Hickory Boulevard loop. It continues the loop from the intersection with Whites Creek Pike (US 431) in Whites Creek. Traveling parallel to Little Creek, it enters Nashville proper and continues past I-24 exit 40 to its intersection with US 31W/US 41 (Dickerson Pike). After that intersection, the road becomes a four-lane divided highway. SR 45 goes south of Cedar Hill Park and past I-65 exit 92 to enter Madison, where it has an intersection with US 31E (Gallatin Pike). After it crosses the Cumberland River, SR 45 continues onto Robinson Road through the town of Old Hickory before rejoining Old Hickory Boulevard. It heads south through Lakewood and by The Hermitage, to the eponymous town of Hermitage, where it has intersections with US 70 (Lebanon Pike) and SR 265 (Central Pike). SR 45 ends at I-40 exit 221, and Old Hickory Boulevard continues south to Bell Road.

== Major intersections ==
The entire route is in Davidson County.

Location	mi	km	Destinations	Notes
Whites Creek	0.0	0.0	US 431 (SR 65/Whites Creek Pike) – Joelton, Springfield, Nashville	Western terminus; road continues west as Old Hickory Boulevard
Nashville	2.0	3.2	I-24 – Clarksville, Murfreesboro	I-24 exit 40
Nashville	4.7	7.6	US 31W / US 41 (SR 11/Dickerson Pike) – Goodlettsville, Nashville	
Nashville	5.8	9.3	I-65 – Nashville, Louisville	I-65 exit 92
Madison	7.2	11.6	US 31E (Gallatin Pike/SR 6) – Nashville, Hendersonville	Known as SR 45 from US 31E eastward to the Cumberland River; known as Robinson Rd. in Old Hickory
Hermitage	15.7	25.3	US 70 (SR 24/Lebanon Pike) – Nashville, Donelson, Mount Juliet, Lebanon	
Hermitage	17.7	28.5	SR 265 (Central Pike) – Mount Juliet	
Hermitage	17.92	28.84	I-40 – Knoxville, Nashville	Eastern terminus; I-40 exit 221; road continues south as Old Hickory Boulevard
1.000 mi = 1.609 km; 1.000 km = 0.621 mi
