= Flag of Nashville, Tennessee =

City of Nashville and Davidson County
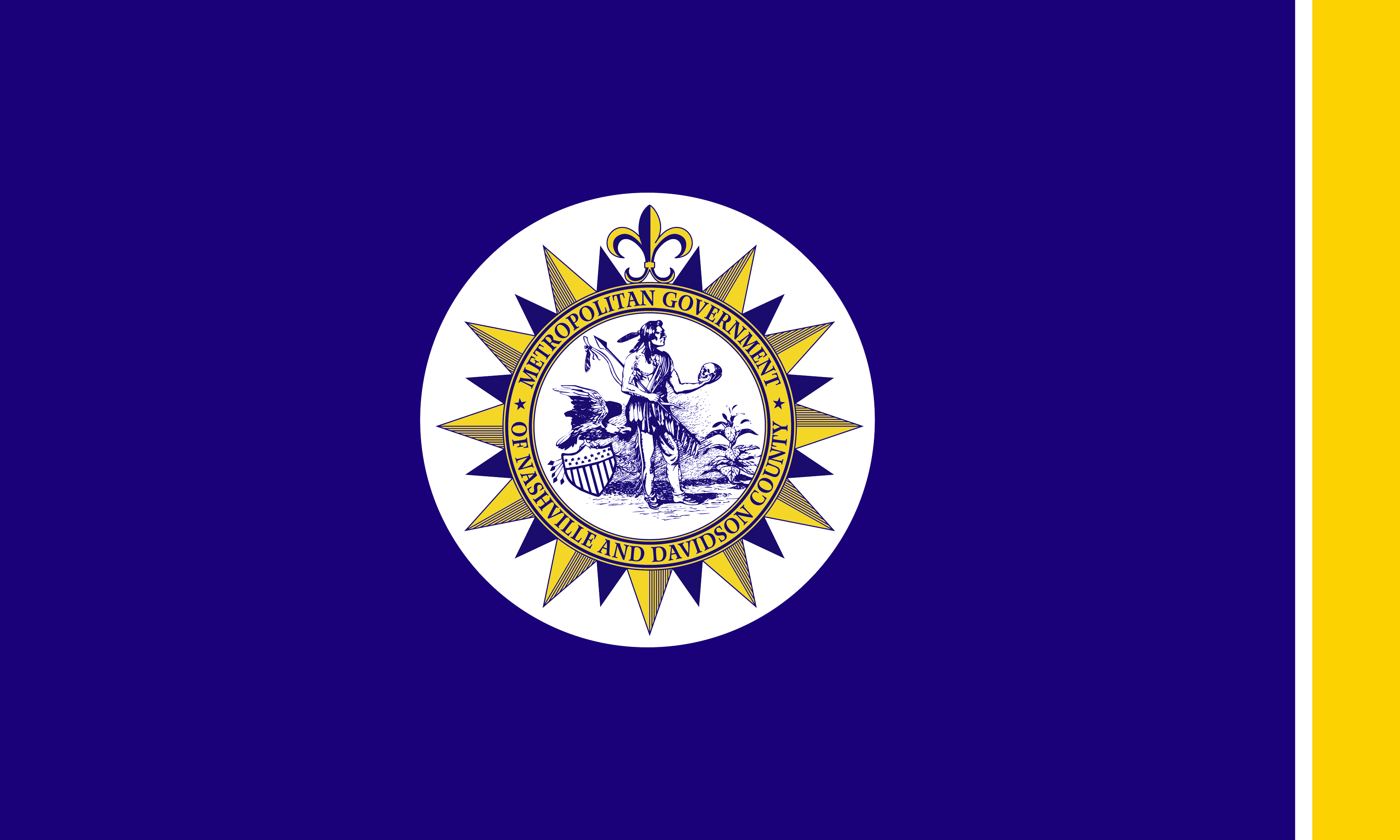
- Proportion: 3:5
- Adopted: December 1963
- Design: A blue field with the right edge in yellow, separated by a thin white strip, with the Seal of Nashville in the center of the blue portion
- Designed by: Unnamed artists

The city flag of Nashville, Tennessee consists of the city's seal on a white disc surrounded by a field of blue, with a strip of gold on the fly. According to the resolution adopting the flag, the blue stands for the courage and conviction of the city's leaders throughout history, while the gold denotes the richness of city's land and resources. The flag was adopted in December 1963 when the governments of Nashville and Davidson County merged to form the Metro government. In an official ceremony, it was reigned in as the new flag on August 4, 1964, at the Metropolitan Courthouse. The flag is modeled after the Tennessee state flag.

== History ==
Flag of Nashville 1961–1964

The seal displays a Native American holding a skull standing by a tobacco plant, an eagle, and a badge-shaped shield decorated in a style similar to the American flag. The Native is said to be a representative of the "Woodland" culture contemplating the skull of a member of an earlier Native culture such as the Mound Builders. Though the de jure version of the flag included a monochromatic seal, today flags in Nashville are displayed with the seal in full color. Additionally, there is usually a thin white bar separating the outer strip of yellow from the blue field.

Prior to the consolidation, the flag consisted of a blue star on a red background overlapped by two crossing white bars. The blue star was enclosed in golden olive branches located under the letter N, standing for the city name. It had been designed by Harville H. Duncan and adopted by the City Council in 1961.

In a review by the North American Vexillological Association of 150 U.S. city flags, the Nashvillian flag came in 43rd with a rating of 4.85 out of 10. The group cited Nashville's use of its city seal, which they said makes flags difficult to discern from a distance. They also stated that the gold outer stripe would not have much functionality, because flags tend to fray, and the outer edge occasionally needs shaving. Mayor Bill Purcell commented, "Flags are a subjective thing. People in the rest of the country may not appreciate our unique flag. It's a flag that takes some time to get comfortable with. There are not many flags with a skull on it."
