= Tennessee State Route 251 =

State highway in Tennessee, United States

State Route 251
- River Road; River Road Pike; Old Hickory Boulevard
- SR 251 highlighted in red

Route information
- Maintained by TDOT
- Length: 15.7 mi (25.3 km)
- Existed: July 1, 1983–present

Major junctions
- West end: SR 249 south of Ashland City
- US 70 in Nashville; I-40 in Nashville
- East end: US 70S in Bellevue

Location
- Country: United States
- State: Tennessee
- Counties: Cheatham, Davidson

Highway system
- Tennessee State Routes; Interstate; US; State
← SR 250	→ SR 252

State Route 251 (SR 251) is a west–east secondary state highway in Middle Tennessee.

== Route description ==
SR 251 begins in rural Cheatham County at an intersection with SR 249 (Sams Creek Road/River Road) south of Ashland City. It winds its way southeast along the banks of the Cumberland River as River Road to cross into Davidson County. It continues southeast as River Road Pike as it enters Nashville and has an intersection with US 70/SR 24 (Charlotte Pike), where SR 251 becomes part of Old Hickory Boulevard. It then continues south to have an interchange with I-40 (Exit 199) before entering Bellevue, where it comes to an end at an intersection with US 70S/SR 1 and Old Hickory Boulevard continues southward.

== Major intersections ==
County	Location	mi	km	Destinations	Notes
Cheatham		0.0	0.0	SR 249 (Sams Creek Road/River Road) – Pegram, Ashland City	Western terminus
Davidson	Nashville			US 70 (Charlotte Pike/SR 24) – Pegram, Downtown	
Davidson	Nashville			I-40 – Memphis, Nashville	I-40 exit 199
Davidson	Bellevue	15.7	25.3	US 70S (SR 1) – Pegram, Belle Meade	Eastern terminus; roadway continues south as Old Hickory Boulevard
1.000 mi = 1.609 km; 1.000 km = 0.621 mi

== See also ==
- List of state routes in Tennessee
