= Madison Academy (Tennessee) =

Location
- 100 Academy Road; Madison, Tennessee 37115; 36.2537°N 86.6793°W

Information
- School type: High school
- Principal: Kris Fuentes, Ed.S.
- Grades: 9-12
- Colors: Blue and White
- Yearbook: Cumberland Echoes
- Affiliation: Seventh-day Adventist
- Website: http://www.madisonacademy.com

Madison Academy is a Seventh-day Adventist academy located in Madison, Tennessee. It is a part of the Seventh-day Adventist education system, the world's second largest Christian school system.

== See also ==
- List of Seventh-day Adventist secondary schools
- Seventh-day Adventist education
