= Davidson County, Tennessee =

County in Tennessee, United States

Metropolitan Government of Nashville and Davidson County
- Consolidated city-county
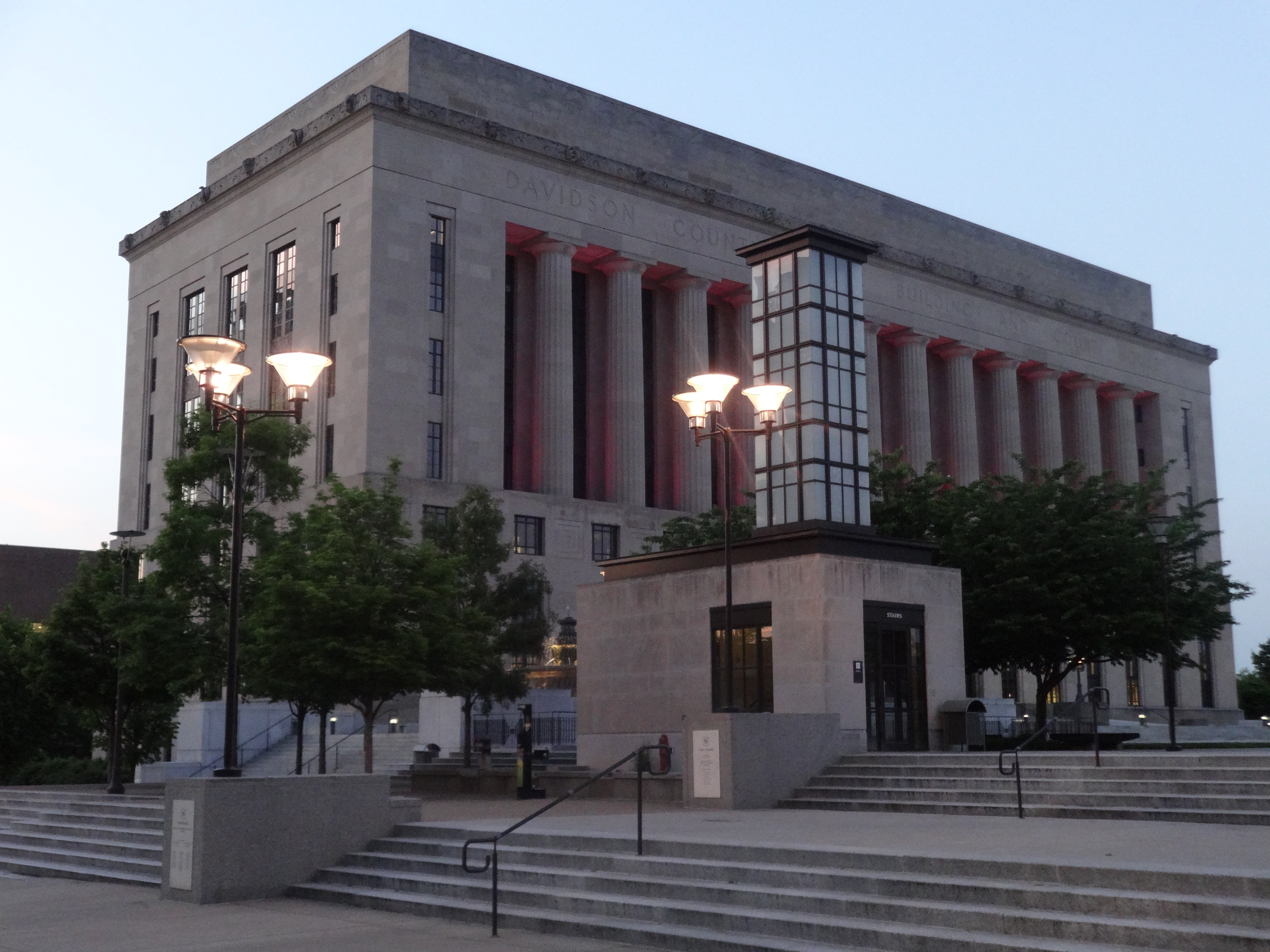
- Davidson County Courthouse

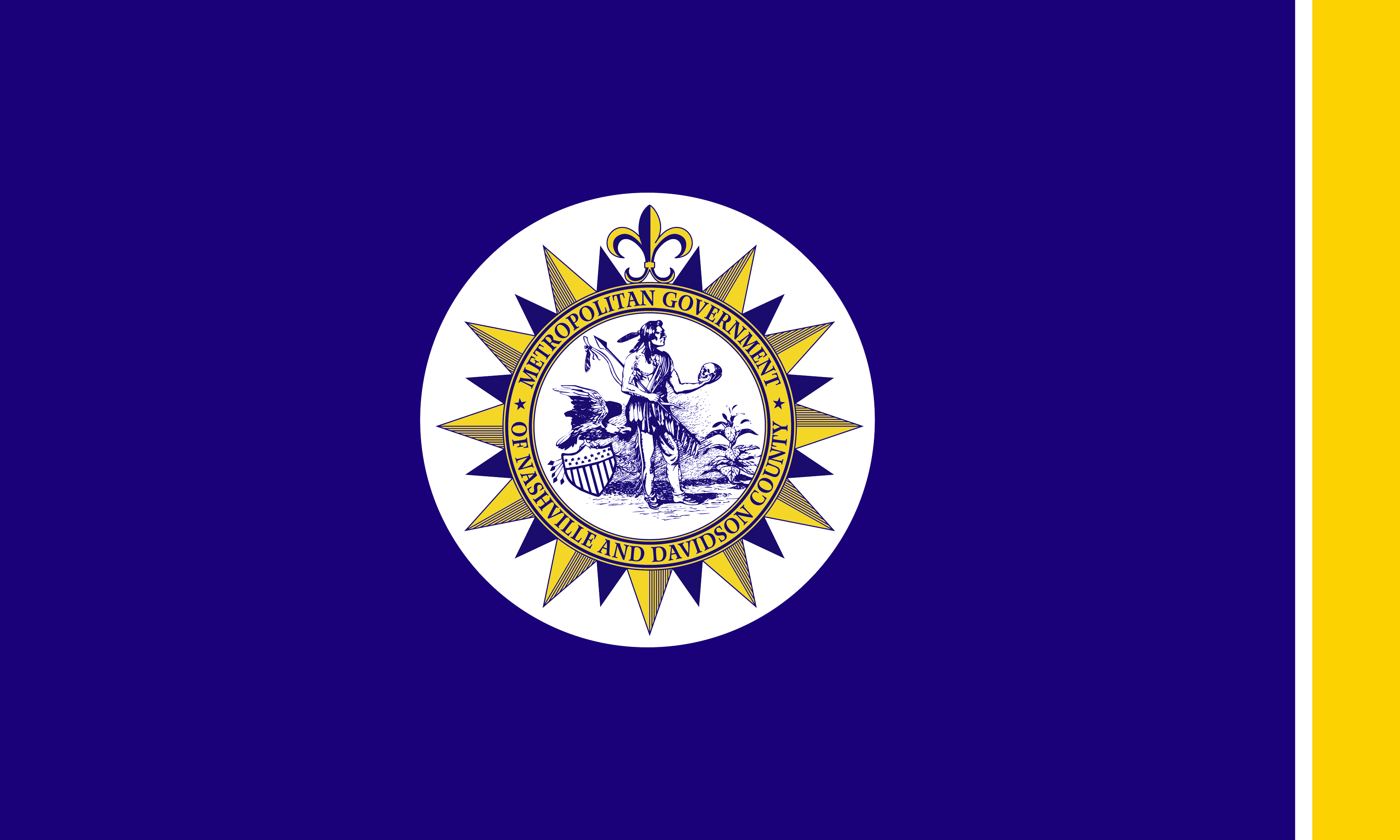
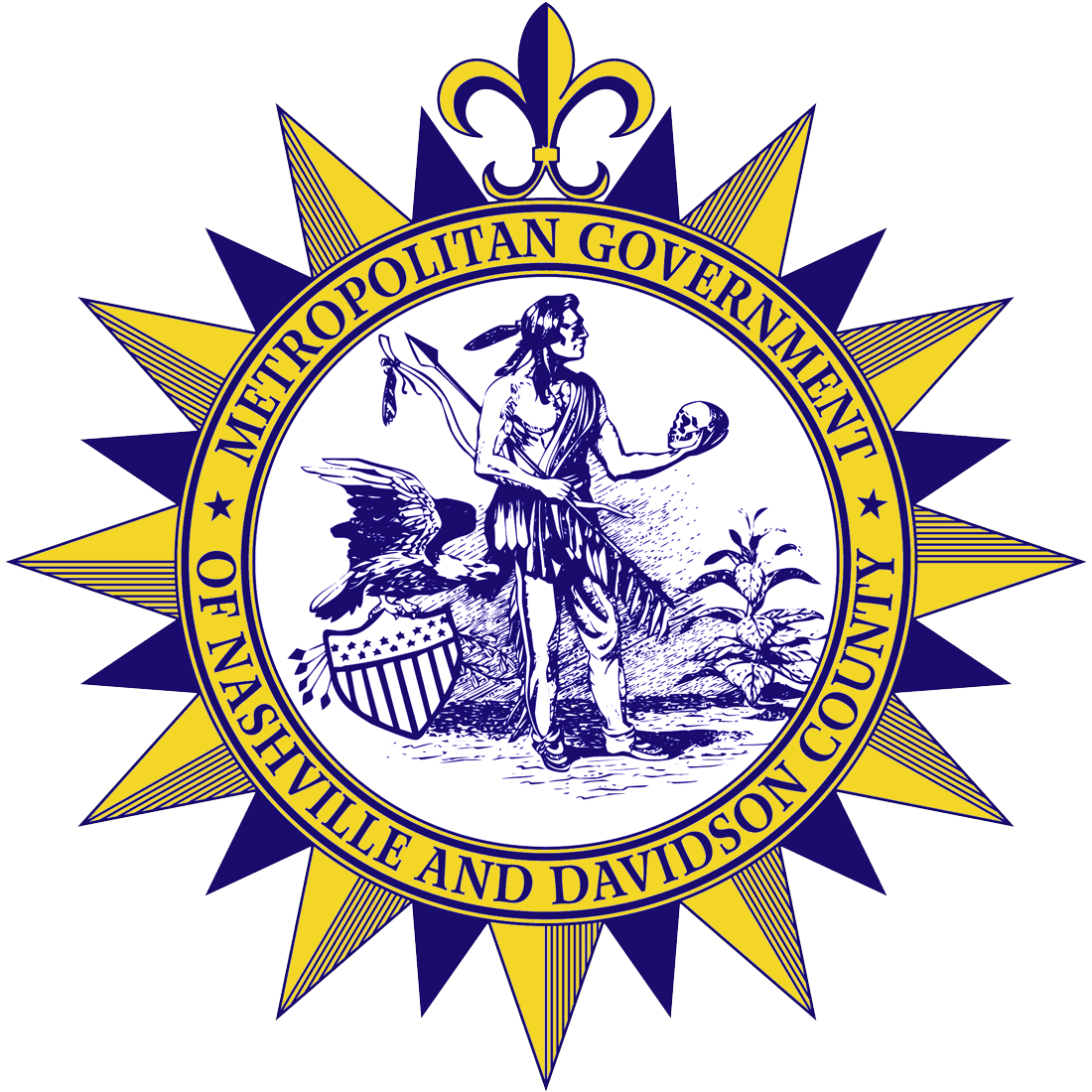
- Flag Seal

- Location within the U.S. state of Tennessee
- Coordinates: 36.17°N 86.78°W
- Country: United States
- State: Tennessee
- Founded: October 6, 1783
- Named for: William Lee Davidson
- Seat: Nashville
- Largest city: Nashville

Government
  - Mayor: Freddie O'Connell (D)

Area
  - Total: 526 sq mi (1,360 km^{2})
  - Land: 504 sq mi (1,310 km^{2})
  - Water: 22 sq mi (57 km^{2}) 4.2%

Population (2020)
  - Total: 715,884
  - Estimate (2025): 745,904 ▲
  - Density: 1,420/sq mi (548/km^{2})

GDP
  - Total: $116.879 billion (2024)
- Time zone: UTC−6 (Central)
  - Summer (DST): UTC−5 (CDT)
- Area code: 615, 629
- Congressional districts: 5th, 6th, 7th
- Website: www.nashville.gov

Davidson County is a county in the U.S. state of Tennessee. It is located in the central part of the region of Middle Tennessee. As of the 2020 census, the population was 715,884, making it the second most populous county in Tennessee. Its county seat is Nashville, the state capital and most populous city.

Since 1963, the city of Nashville and Davidson County have had a consolidated government called the "Metropolitan Government of Nashville and Davidson County", commonly referred to as "Metro Nashville" or "Metro". This is distinct from the larger metropolitan area.

Davidson County has the largest population in the 13-county Nashville metropolitan area, the state's most populous metropolitan area. Nashville has always been one of the region's centers of commerce, industry, transportation, and culture, but it did not become the capital of Tennessee until 1827 and did not gain permanent capital status until 1843.

== History ==
Davidson County is the oldest county in the 41-county region of Middle Tennessee. It dates to 1783, shortly after the end of the American Revolution, when the North Carolina legislature created the county and named it in honor of William Lee Davidson, a North Carolina general who was killed opposing the crossing of the Catawba River by General Cornwallis's British forces on February 1, 1781. The county seat, Nashville, is the oldest permanent European settlement in Middle Tennessee, founded by James Robertson and John Donelson during the winter of 1779–1780 and the waning days of the Revolutionary War.

The first white settlers established the Cumberland Compact to establish a basic rule of law and to protect their land titles. Through much of the early 1780s, the settlers also faced a hostile response from Native American tribes such as the Cherokee, Muscogee (Creek), and Shawnee who used the area as a hunting ground; they resented the newcomers moving into the area in violation of treaties and competing for its resources. As the county's many known archaeological sites attest, Native American cultures had occupied areas of Davidson County for thousands of years. The first white Americans to enter the area were fur traders. Long hunters came next, having heard about a large salt lick, known as French Lick, where they hunted game and traded with the Native Americans.

In 1765, Timothy Demonbreun, a hunter, trapper, and former Governor of Illinois under the French, and his wife lived in a small cave (now known as Demonbreun's Cave) on the south side of the Cumberland River near present-day downtown Nashville. They were the parents of the first white child to be born in Middle Tennessee. A number of the settlers came from Kentucky and the Upper South. Since the land was fertile, they cultivated hemp and tobacco, using the labor of enslaved African Americans, and also raised blooded livestock of high quality, including horses. Generally holding less land than the plantations of Western Tennessee, many Middle Tennessee planters nevertheless became wealthy during this period.

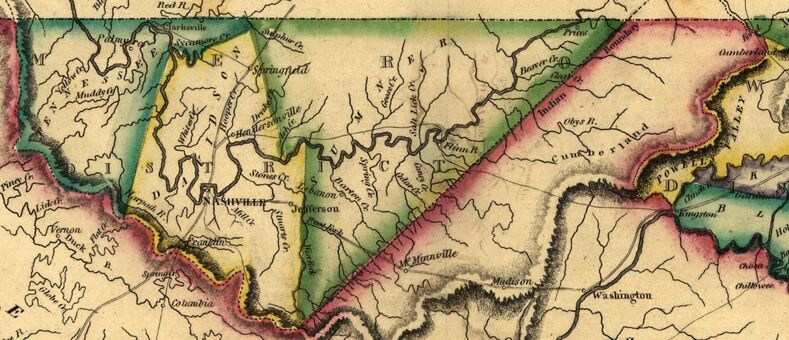
Map of Tennessee Districts in 1817: Tennessee, Davidson, and Sumner

Davidson County was much larger when it was created in 1783. Its initial boundaries were defined as follows:

"[A]ll that part of this State lying west of the Cumberland mountain and south of the Virginia line, beginning on the top of Cumberland mountain where the Virginia line crosses, extending westward along the said line to Tennessee River, thence up said river to the mouth of Duck River, then up Duck River to where the line of marked trees run by the commissioners for laying off land granted the Continental line of this State intersects said river (which said line is supposed to be in thirty-five degrees fifty minutes north latitude) thence east along said line to the top of Cumberland mountain, thence northwardly along said mountain to the beginning".

However, four more counties were carved out of Davidson County's territory between 1786 and 1856.

- Sumner County created in 1786
- Williamson County, created in 1799
- Rutherford County, created in 1803 (also included parts of Wilson County)
- Cheatham County, created in 1856 (also included parts of Dickson, Montgomery and Robertson counties)

Following the outbreak of the American Civil War in 1861, the voters of Davidson County voted narrowly in favor of seceding from the United States: 5,635 in favor, 5,572 against. However, the Union Army occupied the county in February 1862, which caused widespread social disruption as the state's governing institutions broke down.

== Notable people ==
See List of people from Nashville, Tennessee for notable people that were residents of both Nashville and Davidson County.

- Kizziah J. Bills, Black American suffragist, a correspondent and columnist for Black press in Chicago, and a civil rights activist. She was raised in Davidson County.
- Newman Haynes Clanton, Democrat, western cattle rustler and outlaw
- Jermain Wesley Loguen, abolitionist leader
- Benjamin "Pap" Singleton, abolitionist leader

== Geography ==
Interactive map of Davidson County

According to the U.S. Census Bureau, the county has a total area of 526 square miles (1,360 km^{2}), of which 504 square miles (1,310 km^{2}) is land and 22 square miles (57 km^{2}) (4.2%) is water.

The Cumberland River flows from east to west through the middle of the county. Two dams within the county are Old Hickory Lock and Dam and J. Percy Priest Dam, operated by the United States Army Corps of Engineers. Important tributaries of the Cumberland in Davidson County include Whites Creek, Manskers Creek, Stones River, Mill Creek, and the Harpeth River.

=== Adjacent counties ===
- Robertson County, Tennessee – north
- Sumner County, Tennessee – northeast
- Wilson County, Tennessee – east
- Rutherford County, Tennessee – southeast
- Williamson County, Tennessee – south
- Cheatham County, Tennessee – west

=== National protected area ===
- Natchez Trace Parkway (part)

=== State protected areas ===
- Bicentennial Mall State Park
- Couchville Cedar Glade State Natural Area (part)
- Harpeth River State Park (part)
- Hill Forest State Natural Area
- Long Hunter State Park (part)
- Mount View Glade State Natural Area
- Percy Priest Wildlife Management Area (part)
- Radnor Lake State Natural Area

=== Major highways ===
- I-24
- I-40
- I-65
- I-440
- US 31
- US 31A
- US 31E
- US 31W
- US 41
- US 41A
- US 70
- US 70S
- US 431
- SR 12
- SR 45
- SR 96
- SR 100
- SR 155
- SR 171
- SR 174
- SR 251
- SR 253
- SR 254
- SR 255
- SR 265
- SR 386

== Demographics ==
Historical population
Census	Pop.	Note	%±
1790	3,459		—
1800	9,965		188.1%
1810	15,608		56.6%
1820	20,154		29.1%
1830	28,122		39.5%
1840	30,509		8.5%
1850	38,882		27.4%
1860	47,055		21.0%
1870	62,897		33.7%
1880	79,026		25.6%
1890	108,174		36.9%
1900	122,815		13.5%
1910	149,478		21.7%
1920	167,815		12.3%
1930	222,854		32.8%
1940	257,267		15.4%
1950	321,758		25.1%
1960	399,743		24.2%
1970	448,003		12.1%
1980	477,811		6.7%
1990	510,784		6.9%
2000	569,891		11.6%
2010	626,681		10.0%
2020	715,884		14.2%
2025 (est.)	745,904	▲	4.2%
U.S. Decennial Census; 1790–1960 1900–1990; 1990–2000 2010–2020

=== Racial and ethnic composition ===
Davidson County, Tennessee – Racial and ethnic composition Note: the US Census treats Hispanic/Latino as an ethnic category. This table excludes Latinos from the racial categories and assigns them to a separate category. Hispanics/Latinos may be of any race.
Race / ethnicity (NH = Non-Hispanic)	Pop 1980	Pop 1990	Pop 2000	Pop 2010	Pop 2020	% 1980	% 1990	% 2000	% 2010	% 2020
White alone (NH)	364,059	378,925	371,150	359,883	386,835	76.19%	74.18%	65.13%	57.43%	54.04%
Black or African American alone (NH)	105,642	118,813	146,939	172,075	171,489	22.11%	23.26%	25.78%	27.46%	23.95%
Native American or Alaska Native alone (NH)	546	1,089	1,497	1,450	1,309	0.11%	0.21%	0.26%	0.23%	0.18%
Asian alone (NH)	2,316	6,916	13,186	18,878	27,660	0.48%	1.35%	2.31%	3.01%	3.86%
Native Hawaiian or Pacific Islander alone (NH)	x	x	364	293	303	x	x	0.06%	0.05%	0.04%
Other race alone (NH)	1,507	266	938	1,185	3,210	0.32%	0.05%	0.16%	0.19%	0.45%
Mixed race or Multiracial (NH)	x	x	9,726	11,800	26,959	x	x	1.71%	1.88%	3.77%
Hispanic or Latino (any race)	3,741	4,775	26,091	61,117	98,119	0.78%	0.93%	4.58%	9.75%	13.71%
Total	477,811	510,784	569,891	626,681	715,884	100.00%	100.00%	100.00%	100.00%	100.00%

=== 2020 census ===
As of the 2020 census, the county had a population of 715,884, 301,236 households, and 152,833 families residing in the county. The median age was 33.9 years, 20.0% of residents were under the age of 18, and 12.4% were 65 years of age or older. For every 100 females there were 93.1 males, and for every 100 females age 18 and over there were 90.8 males age 18 and over.

Of the county's households, 25.2% had children under the age of 18 living in them, 35.2% were married-couple households, 22.7% were households with a male householder and no spouse or partner present, and 34.2% were households with a female householder and no spouse or partner present. About 35.1% of all households were made up of individuals and 9.0% had someone living alone who was 65 years of age or older.

There were 328,309 housing units, of which 8.2% were vacant. Among occupied housing units, 51.2% were owner-occupied and 48.8% were renter-occupied. The homeowner vacancy rate was 1.5% and the rental vacancy rate was 7.7%.

The racial makeup of the county was 56.0% White, 24.2% Black or African American, 0.6% American Indian and Alaska Native, 3.9% Asian, <0.1% Native Hawaiian and Pacific Islander, 7.9% from some other race, and 7.5% from two or more races. Hispanic or Latino residents of any race comprised 13.7% of the population.

96.9% of residents lived in urban areas, while 3.1% lived in rural areas.

=== 2000 census ===
As of the census of 2000, there were 569,891 people, 237,405 households, and 138,169 families residing in the county. The population density was 1,135 people per square mile (438 people/km^{2}). There were 252,977 housing units at an average density of 504 units per square mile (195/km^{2}). The racial makeup of the county was 67.0% White, 26.0% Black or African American, 0.3% Native American, 2.3% Asian, 0.1% Pacific Islander, 2.4% from other races, and 2.0% from two or more races. 4.6% of the population were Hispanic or Latino of any race.

In 2005 the racial makeup of the county was 61.7% non-Hispanic white, 27.5% African-American, 6.6% Latino and 2.8% Asian.

In 2000 there were 237,405 households, out of which 26.7% had children under the age of 18 living with them, 39.9% were married couples living together, 14.3% had a female householder with no husband present, and 41.8% were non-families. 33.4% of all households were made up of individuals, and 8.2% had someone living alone who was 65 years of age or older. The average household size was 2.30 and the average family size was 2.96.

In the county, the population was spread out, with 22.2% under the age of 18, 11.6% from 18 to 24, 34.0% from 25 to 44, 21.1% from 45 to 64, and 11.1% who were 65 years of age or older. The median age was 34 years. For every 100 females, there were 93.80 males. For every 100 females age 18 and over, there were 90.80 males.

The median income for a household in the county was $39,797, and the median income for a family was $49,317. Males had a median income of $33,844 versus $27,770 for females. The per capita income for the county was $23,069. About 10.0% of families and 13.0% of the population were below the poverty line, including 19.1% of those under age 18 and 10.5% of those age 65 or over.

== Politics ==
Davidson County is a Democratic stronghold, due to it comprising the liberal bastion of Nashville. It last went Republican when George H. W. Bush won the county in 1988, and Democratic presidential candidates have handily won the county by double-digit margins since. However, Davidson County has trended even more Democratic in recent years while most of the state has shifted Republican, mainly due to its changing demographics and rapid growth. In 2020, Joe Biden won Davidson county over Donald Trump with 64.5% of the vote and a 32.1% margin of victory, the best Democratic performance in the county since Franklin D. Roosevelt's landslide victories. This election was also the first time since 1980 that Davison County gave a Democrat a higher percentage than majority-Black and longtime Democratic stronghold Shelby County, a trend that continued in 2024 even as Trump regained a large amount of suburban support nationwide.

In local elections, the county is equally Democratic. Since the end of the Civil War, Nashville has mostly been in the 5th district, however, between 1875 and 1933, and 1943 and 1953, it was located in the 6th district. Before 2023 no Republican had represented Nashville in the US House of Representatives since Horace Harrison left office in 1875. No Republican has ever served as the mayor of unified Davidson County.

In 2022, the Tennessee's Legislature passed a new map for Tennessee's congressional districts to account for the new 2020 census data. The Republican Party had total control of the Tennessee government at the time, giving it full control of the redistricting process. The new map that was passed gerrymandered Davidson County into three congressional districts, resulting in Republicans winning them all in 2022. The political shift in Nashville has also resulted in friction between the city government and state legislature in the 2020s.

=== Election results ===
2024 US presidential election in Davidson County Harris: 40–50% 50–60% 60–70% 70–80%; 80–90%; 90-100%; Trump: 40–50%; 50–60%; 60–70%; 70–80%; 90-100%; No data

United States presidential election results for Davidson County, Tennessee
Year	Republican		Democratic		Third party(ies)	
Year	No.	%	No.	%	No.	%
1880	6,449	44.66%	7,543	52.24%	448	3.10%
1884	8,111	49.55%	8,165	49.88%	94	0.57%
1888	9,321	47.16%	9,715	49.15%	730	3.69%
1892	2,993	24.40%	8,480	69.14%	792	6.46%
1896	5,720	41.88%	7,511	54.99%	428	3.13%
1900	2,501	25.78%	6,869	70.81%	330	3.40%
1904	1,900	19.08%	7,735	77.69%	321	3.22%
1908	2,721	24.23%	8,309	73.98%	202	1.80%
1912	1,428	11.44%	9,517	76.25%	1,536	12.31%
1916	3,168	25.71%	8,958	72.71%	194	1.57%
1920	6,811	33.48%	13,354	65.63%	181	0.89%
1924	4,516	26.18%	11,363	65.88%	1,370	7.94%
1928	15,322	53.21%	13,442	46.68%	34	0.12%
1932	7,004	24.43%	21,233	74.07%	429	1.50%
1936	4,467	14.81%	25,530	84.65%	161	0.53%
1940	8,763	24.11%	27,589	75.89%	0	0.00%
1944	10,174	27.68%	26,493	72.07%	93	0.25%
1948	8,410	22.34%	20,877	55.46%	8,356	22.20%
1952	35,916	40.99%	51,562	58.84%	152	0.17%
1956	37,077	39.08%	56,822	59.89%	975	1.03%
1960	52,077	46.25%	59,649	52.98%	871	0.77%
1964	45,335	36.35%	79,387	63.65%	0	0.00%
1968	44,175	32.34%	44,543	32.61%	47,889	35.06%
1972	82,636	61.30%	48,869	36.25%	3,292	2.44%
1976	60,662	37.54%	99,007	61.27%	1,929	1.19%
1980	65,772	37.45%	103,741	59.08%	6,093	3.47%
1984	98,155	51.99%	89,498	47.40%	1,161	0.61%
1988	98,599	52.18%	89,270	47.25%	1,077	0.57%
1992	76,567	37.57%	106,355	52.18%	20,885	10.25%
1996	78,453	39.15%	110,805	55.30%	11,124	5.55%
2000	84,117	40.33%	120,508	57.77%	3,963	1.90%
2004	107,839	44.51%	132,737	54.78%	1,726	0.71%
2008	102,915	38.80%	158,423	59.73%	3,885	1.46%
2012	97,622	39.76%	143,120	58.29%	4,792	1.95%
2016	84,550	33.95%	148,864	59.77%	15,654	6.29%
2020	100,218	32.36%	199,703	64.49%	9,737	3.14%
2024	102,256	35.26%	181,862	62.70%	5,918	2.04%

=== Federal officers ===
- U.S. Senators: Marsha Blackburn (R) and Bill Hagerty (R)
- U.S. Representatives: Andy Ogles (R – District 5), John Rose (R – District 6) and Mark Green (R – District 7)

=== State officers ===
- State Senators: Charlane Oliver (D), Heidi Campbell (D), Jeff Yarbro (D), and Mark Pody (R)
- State Representatives: Bo Mitchell (D), Aftyn Behn (D), Justin Jones (D), Jason Powell (D), Vincent Dixie (D), John Ray Clemmons (D), Bob Freeman (D), Harold Love (D), Caleb Hemmer (D), Shaundelle Brooks (D)

=== Local officers ===
- Mayor: Freddie O'Connell
- Vice Mayor and Metropolitan Council President: Angie Henderson
- City Council: see Metropolitan Council of Nashville and Davidson County
- Assessor of Property: Vivian M. Wilhoite
- Circuit Court Clerk: Joseph P. Day
- District Attorney General: Glenn R. Funk
- Sheriff: Daron Hall
- Register of Deeds: Karen Johnson

== Communities ==
All of Davidson County is encompassed under the consolidated Metropolitan Government of Nashville and Davidson County. However, several municipalities that were incorporated before consolidation retain some autonomy as independent municipalities. These are:

- Belle Meade
- Berry Hill
- Forest Hills
- Goodlettsville (partly in Sumner County)
- Oak Hill
- Ridgetop (primarily in Robertson County)

For U.S. Census purposes, the portions of Davidson County that lie outside the boundaries of the six independently incorporated municipalities are collectively treated as the Nashville-Davidson balance.

=== Neighborhoods ===
Before consolidation occurred, there were several other communities that were previously unincorporated, while others relinquished their municipal charters. Now neighborhoods of Nashville, they maintain historical identities to varying degrees. These include:

- Antioch
- Bellevue
- Cane Ridge
- Crieve Hall
- Donelson
- Green Hills
- Hermitage
- Inglewood
- Joelton (Zip code partially in Cheatham County)
- Lakewood
- Madison (includes historical Haysboro)
- Old Hickory
- Pasquo
- Una
- West Meade
- Whites Creek

== Education ==
Metropolitan Nashville Public School District is the school district of the entire county.

Tennessee School for the Blind is a state-operated school in Nashville.

== Ecology ==
According to a history published in 1884, when the area was first colonized in the 1770s, "Bears, deer, buffaloes and other wild animals, now extinct in this part of the country, were plentiful, and furnished food for the settlers. Wild cats, wolves and snakes were also numerous, and had their haunts where now stand stately mansions."

== In popular culture ==
Davidson County is referred to in the Billboard Country Airplay number one hit of 2021, Famous Friends, as it was written by native Chris Young along with Cary Barlowe and Corey Crowder.

== See also ==
- National Register of Historic Places listings in Davidson County, Tennessee
- Piomingo
- Buchanan's Station
- Chickasaw
