= Lakewood, Tennessee =

- Neighborhood
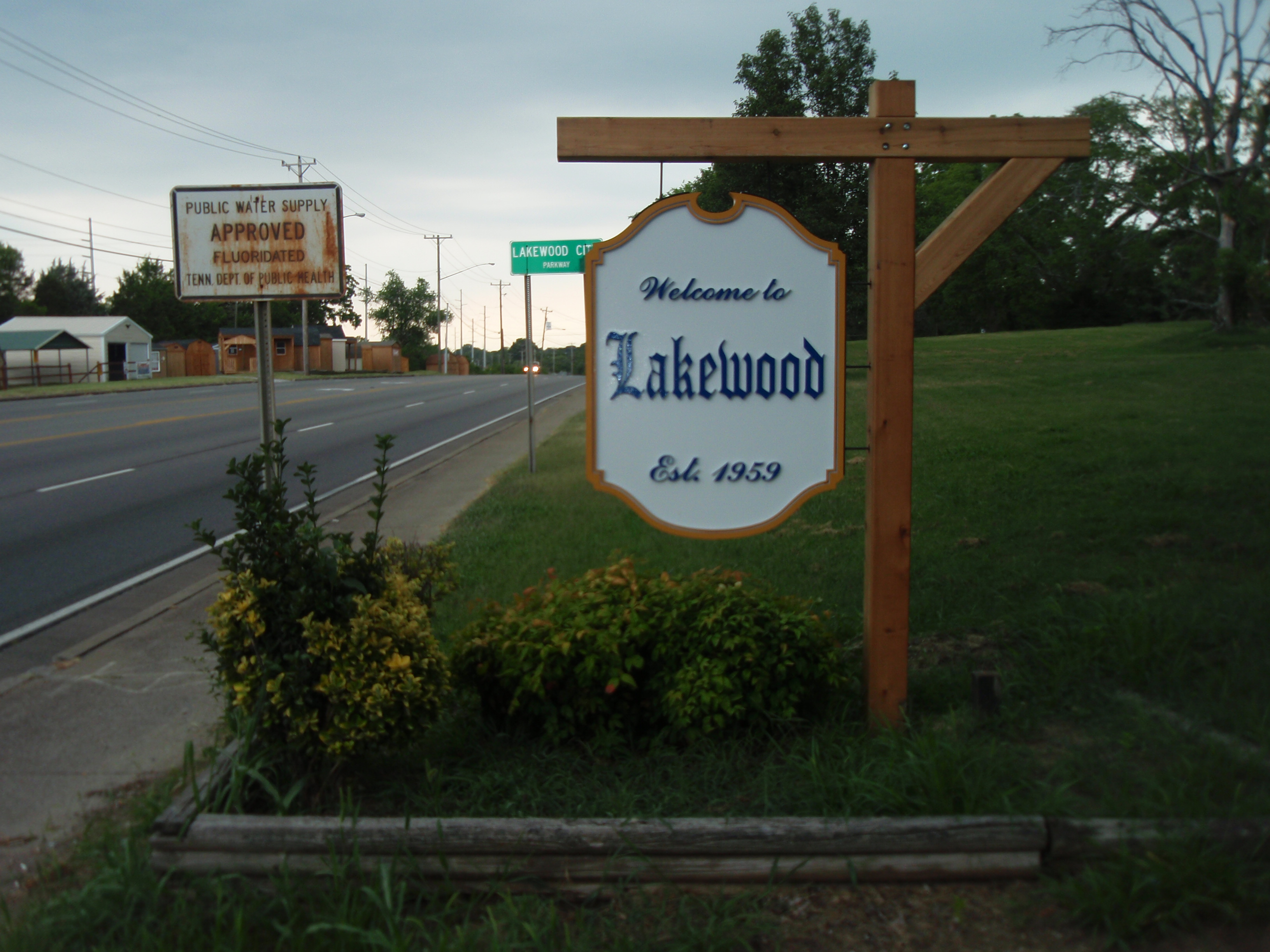
- Sign indicating entrance to Lakewood

- Location in Davidson County and the state of Tennessee.
- Coordinates: 36°14′38″N 86°38′12″W
- Country: United States
- State: Tennessee
- County: Davidson
- City: Nashville
- Incorporated (as Dupontonia): 1959
- Reincorporated (as Lakewood): 1961
- Disincorporated: March 15, 2011

Area
  - Total: 0.97 sq mi (2.5 km^{2})
  - Land: 0.97 sq mi (2.5 km^{2})
  - Water: 0 sq mi (0.0 km^{2})
- Elevation: 469 ft (143 m)

Population (2010)
  - Total: 2,302
  - Density: 2,400/sq mi (920/km^{2})
- Time zone: UTC-6 (Central (CST))
  - Summer (DST): UTC-5 (CDT)
- Zip code: 37138
- Area code: 615
- FIPS code: 47-40720
- GNIS feature ID: 1290534
- Website: http://www.lakewoodtn.org/

Lakewood is a neighborhood of Nashville in Davidson County, Tennessee. The population was 2,302 at the 2010 census, at which time it was an incorporated city, as it was from 1959 until 2011.

== History ==
Originally incorporated as Dupontonia in 1959 (in reference to the DuPont rayon manufacturing facility located nearby), the city changed its name to Lakewood and reincorporated in 1961. In 1963, the governments of Davidson County and the City of Nashville merged to form a consolidated metropolitan government. Lakewood chose not to surrender its charter and to remain autonomous, retaining its charter as a "satellite city". It operated its own city council and funded its own police department.

On August 5, 2010, voters within the city passed a referendum to dissolve the municipal charter and become part of the General Services District of the Metropolitan Government of Nashville and Davidson County. The dissolution passed by one vote: 400 to 399.

The city of Lakewood filed a lawsuit alleging voter fraud in the referendum, including thirteen people voting illegally and others not being allowed to vote because of irregularities. Several leaders of the group "Citizens to Reform Lakewood" were named in the lawsuit. A Davidson County Chancery Court Judge settled the litigation by ordering a new election be held March 15, 2011, on which date residents in Lakewood voted 458 to 447 to surrender their charter and merge services with Metro Nashville.

== Geography ==
Lakewood is located at 36°14′38″N 86°38′12″W (36.243802, -86.636624).

According to the United States Census Bureau, the city, prior to dissolution, had a total area of 1.0 square mile (2.6 km^{2}), all land.

== Demographics ==
As of the census of 2000, there were 2,341 people, 985 households, and 648 families residing in the city. The population density was 2,445.5 inhabitants per square mile (944.2/km^{2}). There were 1,052 housing units at an average density of 1,099.0 per square mile (424.3/km^{2}). The racial makeup of the city was 95.26% White, 2.95% African American, 0.26% Native American, 0.26% Asian, 0.56% from other races, and 0.73% from two or more races. Hispanic or Latino of any race were 1.88% of the population.

There were 985 households, out of which 30.8% had children under the age of 18 living with them, 50.1% were married couples living together, 9.8% had a female householder with no husband present, and 34.2% were non-families. 29.1% of all households were made up of individuals, and 8.8% had someone living alone who was 65 years of age or older. The average household size was 2.38 and the average family size was 2.94.

In the city the population was spread out, with 23.6% under the age of 18, 7.0% from 18 to 24, 34.0% from 25 to 44, 21.8% from 45 to 64, and 13.7% who were 65 years of age or older. The median age was 36 years. For every 100 females, there were 100.3 males. For every 100 females age 18 and over, there were 95.7 males.

The median income for a household in the city was $37,182, and the median income for a family was $46,964. Males had a median income of $32,880 versus $26,275 for females. The per capita income for the city was $18,072. About 9.4% of families and 12.4% of the population were below the poverty line, including 18.4% of those under age 18 and 16.9% of those age 65 or over.
