= Whites Creek, Tennessee =

Neighborhood of Batesville, Tennessee, United States

Whites Creek
- Neighborhood
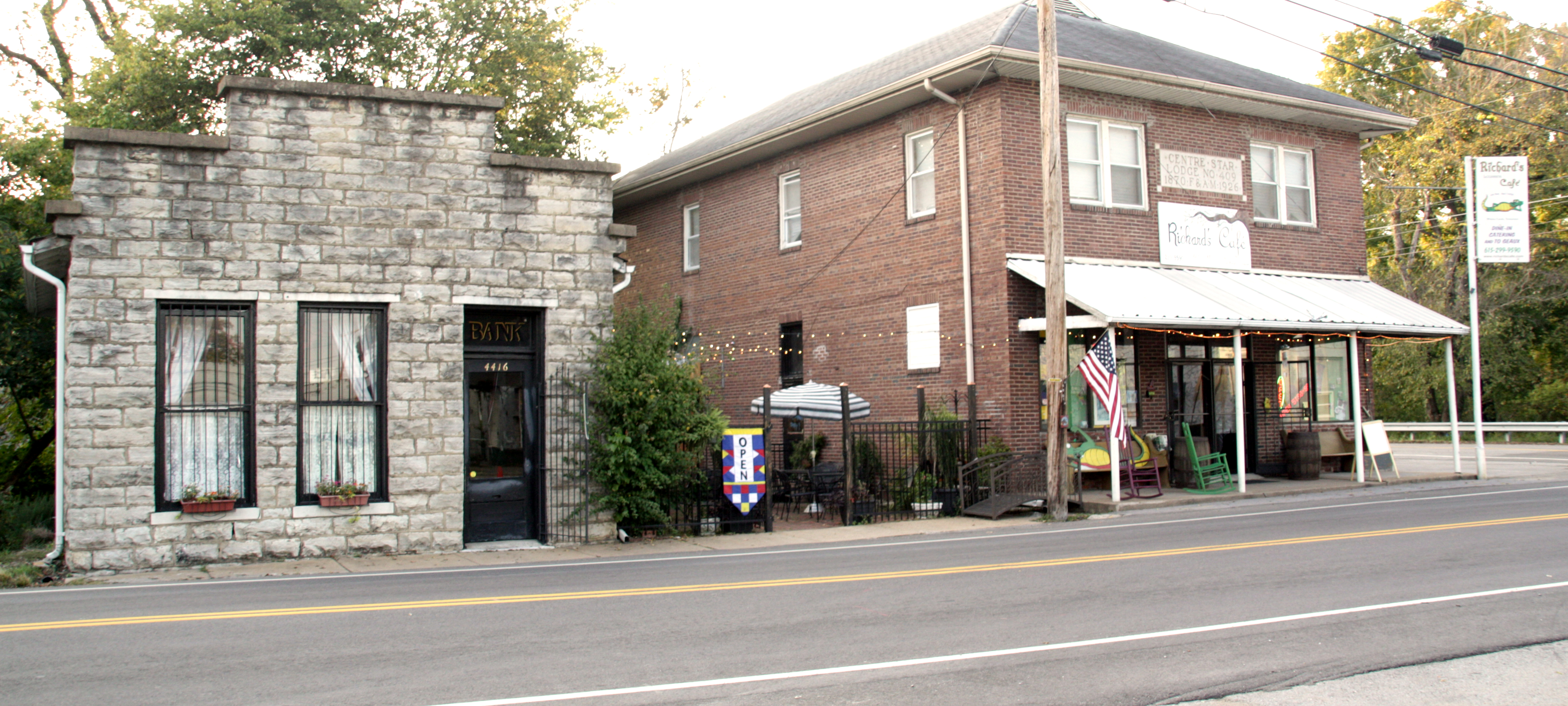
- Old Bank and Centre Star Lodge

- Location within Tennessee Location within the United States
- Coordinates: 36°15′57″N 86°49′51″W
- Country: United States
- State: Tennessee
- County: Davidson
- City: Nashville
- Time zone: UTC-6 (Central (CST))
  - Summer (DST): UTC-5 (CDT)
- Zip code: 37189
- Area codes: 615, 629

- Whites Creek Historic District
- U.S. National Register of Historic Places
- Built: 1830s
- Architect: Multiple
- Architectural style: Late 19th and 20th Century Revivals architecture; Bungalow architecture; Craftsman architecture; Late-Victorian
- NRHP reference No.: 84003530
- Added to NRHP: August 16, 1984

Whites Creek is a neighborhood of Nashville, Tennessee, in Davidson County in the U.S. state of Tennessee. It is governed by the Metropolitan Council of Nashville and Davidson County, because the government of Davidson County is consolidated with that of Nashville.

The community is named for the creek of the same name running north–south along U.S. Route 431.

Whites Creek Historic District was added to the National Register of Historic Places listings in Davidson County, Tennessee on July 18, 1980. It has some of the best preserved examples of the architectural and historical significance of this era in Middle Tennessee.

Whites Creek Comprehensive High School is the community's only high school. The school is a part of the Metro Nashville Public Schools system.

== History ==
The legendary James Gang outlaws visited Whites Creek and rested there in the 1800s. Gang member Bill Ryan was arrested on March 25, 1881, in Whites Creek, prompting gang leaders Frank and Jesse James to leave the area.

Fontanel, the former residence of Barbara Mandrell, is located in Whites Creek. The location was purchased by two investors and reopened to the public, featuring a restaurant, trails, and an amphitheater. It recently added a bed & breakfast called The Inn at Fontanel, and a branch of Prichard's Distillery.

The historic district is Nashville's only historic rural area and it covers 157 acres (64 ha). Located in northwestern Davidson County the area's buildings were built from the 1830s to the early 1900s. Frederick Stump and Jesse James lived in Whites Creek. The Frederick Stump House is in Whites Creek. In 2015 the district was added to an annual historic-endangered list by The Tennessean newspaper: "Historic Nashville lists nine threatened properties".

== Notable residents ==
- JJ Lawhorn – American country music artist-songwriter
- Frank Omiyale – NFL offensive tackle
- Homer "Boots" Randolph – (1927 – 2007) Performed 1963 saxophone hit "Yakety Sax"
- John Rich – Country music star and co-founder of MuzikMafia
- Kid Rock (Robert James Ritchie) - American singer, songwriter, and rapper
- Kane Brown- Country music singer, actor
- Margo Price- American country singer-songwriter, producer, and author
