= Percy Priest Lake =

Reservoir in Davidson, Rutherford, and Wilson Counties, Tennessee, United States

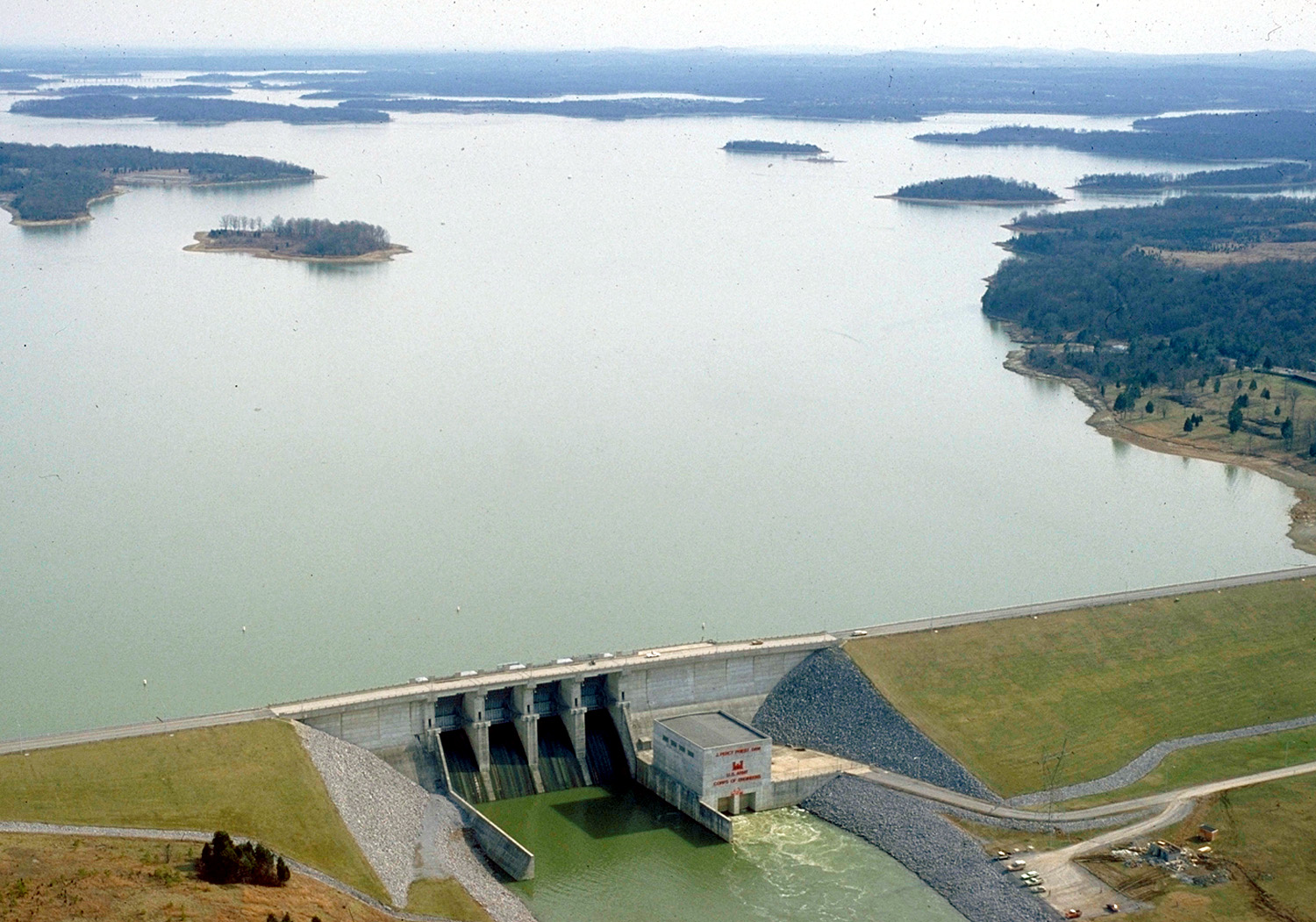
- J. Percy Priest Dam

- Location within Tennessee Location within the United States
- Location: Davidson / Rutherford / Wilson counties Tennessee, US
- Coordinates: 36°09′25″N 86°37′03″W
- Type: Reservoir
- Primary inflows: Stones River
- Primary outflows: Stones River
- Basin countries: United States
- Max. length: 42 miles (68 km)
- Surface area: 14,200 acres (5,700 ha)
- Average depth: 29 ft (8.8 m)
- Max. depth: 100 ft (30 m)
- Water volume: 652,200 acre⋅ft (804,500,000 m^{3})
- Shore length^{1}: 213 miles (343 km)
- Surface elevation: 490 ft (150 m) Summer pool
- ^{1} Shore length is not a well-defined measure.

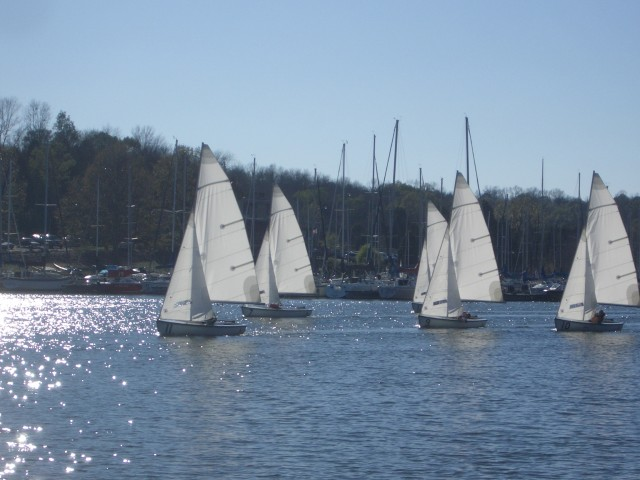
Vanderbilt Sailing Club enjoying Percy Priest Lake

J. Percy Priest Lake is a reservoir in north central Tennessee. It is formed by J. Percy Priest Dam, located between miles six and seven of the Stones River. The dam (easily visible from Interstate 40) is located about 10 miles (16 km) east of downtown Nashville and impounds a lake 42 mi (68 km) long. The lake and dam are named for Congressman Percy Priest.

The lake covers portions of Davidson, Rutherford and Wilson counties and consists of 14,200 acres (5,700 ha) of water at summer pool elevation 490 feet (150 m) above mean sea level. The water is surrounded by 18,854 acres (7,630 ha) of public lands; 10,000 acres (4,000 ha) are devoted to wildlife management. The site of the former town of Old Jefferson was inundated by the reservoir; the community was demolished in the early 1960s for the building of the dam.

The Percy Priest dam project was first authorized by the U.S. Congress in 1946 under the name "Stewarts Ferry Reservoir." An act of Congress approved July 2, 1958, changed the name to honor Congressman Priest. The U.S. Army Corps of Engineers project was completed in 1967.

The dam, powerhouse, lake and public lands are operated and supervised by the Corps of Engineers' Nashville District personnel. The Natural Resource Management Office maintains three campgrounds (Anderson Road, Seven Points and Poole Knobs), eleven day-use/picnic areas (Anderson Road, Cook, Damsite, East Fork, Fate Sanders, Jefferson Springs, Nice's Mill, Overlook, Seven Points, Smith Springs and Tailwater) and twelve boat launching ramps (Anderson Road, Cook, East Fork, Fall Creek, Fate Sanders, Hurricane Creek, Jefferson Springs, Lamar Hill, Mona, Nice's Mill, Poole Knobs, Seven Points, Smith Springs, Stewart's Creek and Viverett Creek). Marinas at the lake include Nashville Shores, Elm Hill, Four Corners, Fate Sanders, Hamilton Creek and Percy Priest. The lake is also home to a number of recreational organizations such as the Tennessee Boat Club, Percy Priest Yacht Club, Vanderbilt Sailing Club, the Vanderbilt Rowing Club and the Nashville Rowing Club.

The lake is mentioned in the song "Cover Me Up" by musician Jason Isbell. It was also the filming location for the 2013 Grammy Award-winning song "Pontoon", recorded by American country band Little Big Town.

On May 29, 2021, a Cessna Citation I/SP private jet crashed into the lake, killing all seven on board, including actor Joe Lara and Christian author and dietician Gwen Shamblin Lara.

== Images ==
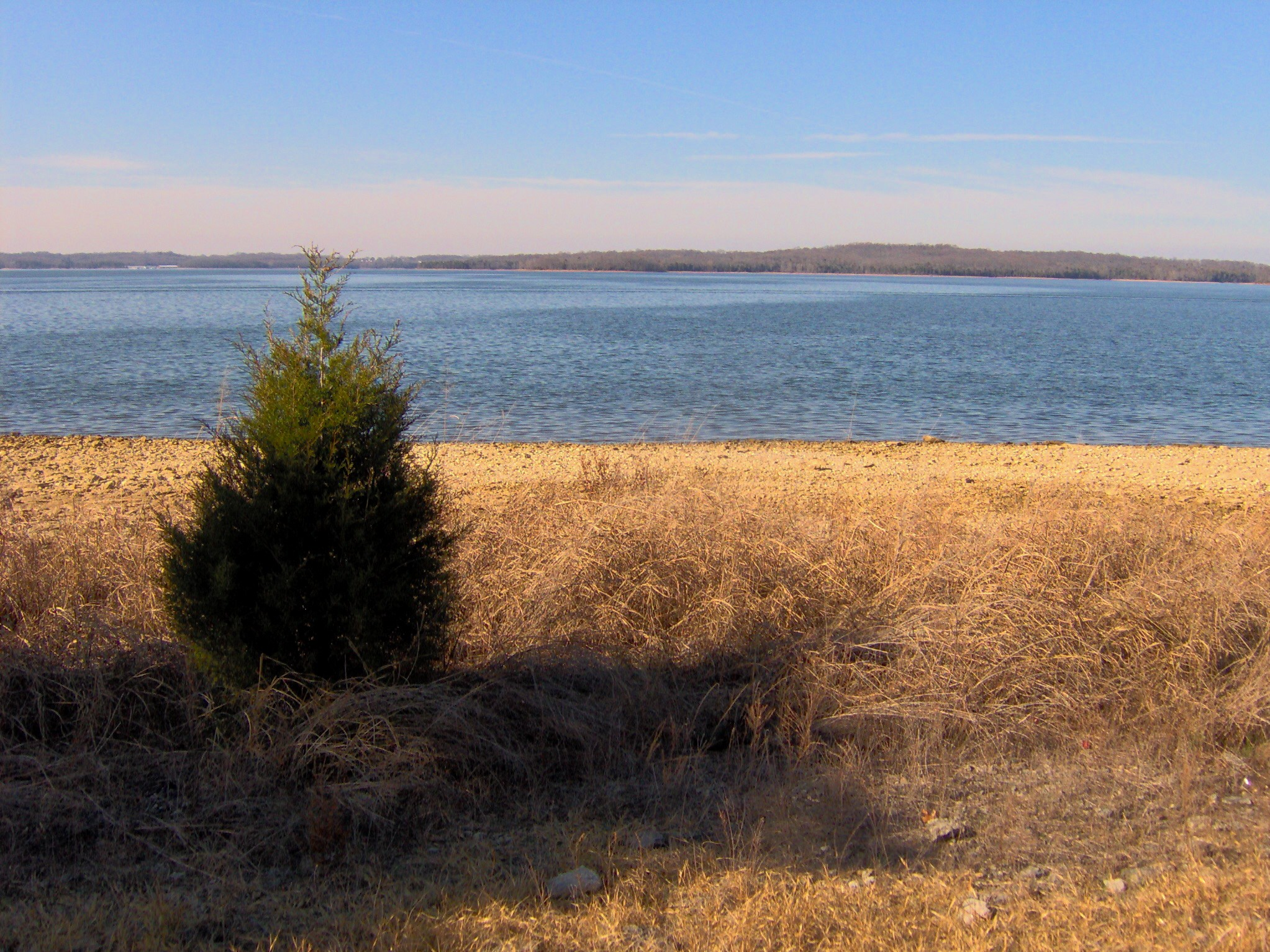
J. Percy Priest Lake impoundment of Stones River near Nashville just off the Volunteer Trail, near the Bakers Grove section
