= Antioch, Nashville =

Antioch
- Neighborhood
- Location within Tennessee Location within the United States
- Coordinates: 36°03′18″N 86°40′21″W
- Country: United States
- State: Tennessee
- County: Davidson
- City: Nashville

Population (2020)
  - Total: 97,372
- ZIP Code: 37013

Antioch is a neighborhood of Nashville located approximately 12 miles (19 km) southeast of Downtown Nashville. It is served by the Metropolitan Government of Nashville and Davidson County.

== History ==
=== 19th century ===
The community known as Antioch began at the convergence of Antioch Pike, Hickory Hollow Parkway, Blue Hole Road, and Mt. View Road. The original town of Antioch began with a church located at Mill Creek in 1810. Antioch was a commuter town because workers traveled to and from downtown Nashville. From the beginning, the town provided immediate services like a post office and general store. For planning purposes, the community was given the name Antioch–Priest Lake because the study area encompassed areas near J. Percy Priest Lake and the neighborhoods that grew from the heart of Antioch in the early 19th century.

In 1810, the First Baptist Church was organized in the area near Mill Creek. Then in 1820, a large landowner by the name of Charles Hays donated land for the church to build on and began referring to it as the "Church at Antioch," giving the village its name. Hays based the name change on a biblical passage, Acts 11:26 (KJV), which states "... and the disciples were called Christians first in Antioch." Thus, the village was known as Antioch from 1820 onward. For a short time in the 1870s and 1880s, the post office designation for the village was Oneyville, named after the postmaster of that time, Dr. J. H. Oney. However, it was later changed back to Antioch.

Now a town featuring a post office, Antioch began to grow, covering an area of one to two miles in either direction. The Antioch mail route itself also covered additional areas outside of those communities. Beyond that initial two-mile boundary were the communities of Una, Mt. View, Cane Ridge, Tusculum, and Bakertown.

Much of the land in the town of Antioch was owned by Charles Hays, and he remained the largest landowner through the first few decades of Antioch's existence. By the end of the 1840s, however, road construction had begun on Mill Creek Valley Pike (now known as Antioch Pike), and the road opened for use in 1846. Construction also began on a railroad that would change the face of the community.

The railroad built near the town of Antioch was vital for mail delivery and those workers who had jobs in the "big city" of Nashville. Even in those times, the commute to Downtown Nashville was a chore, requiring riding a horse to Nolensville Road, followed by a trolley that took a half day to get to Downtown. The first train helped workers get to and from Nashville quickly. In its heyday, approximately 18 passengers were taking the train to and from the city of Nashville per workday.

Over the years, there were four trains that ran both north and south that stopped at various station locations in Antioch. The first station was situated southwest of present day Una-Antioch Pike. The book With Good Will and Affection ... for Antioch states that this may be in the spot where Hickory Hollow Parkway runs today. In 1891, the train station would move to its second location near the terminus of Blue Hole Road at Antioch Pike. This was the final location prior to the arrival of the automobile. In later years, because of the increasing usage of the automobile, the railroad would remain in operation, but primarily for mail delivery.

Even though railroad usage was declining, the town of Antioch continued to grow through its local commerce. By the 1880s, the village consisted of a railroad station, one church, one store, a blacksmith shop, and a few residences.

=== 20th century ===
In the 1930s, an automobile repair shop and, later, a village pub would replace the blacksmith shop. Also in the area, local music teachers taught lessons out of a home on Mill Creek Valley Pike (Antioch Pike), and a two-story grocery store was owned and operated by a bachelor, Mr. Harris, who lived on the second floor of the premises. The post office remained as a community staple in the area and existed as part of the local grocery stores in subsequent years.

Over time, as Antioch continued to grow through suburbanization, it became more difficult to pinpoint where exactly Antioch was located. Having never formed as an incorporated city, the town of Antioch was mostly defined by its postal address. Identifying the community this way also proved difficult because the mail route was not confined to the small area around Blue Hole Road. A 1993 Nashville Scene magazine article titled "An Antioch State of Mind" reported that the Antioch post office grew to serve 14 rural routes and 11 urban routes. Despite the confusion about where Antioch started and stopped, people continued to be drawn to the area, and it saw significant growth in subsequent years.

In the 1970s, Antioch experienced explosive growth, largely due to the expansion of the Nashville sewer system to the area and the availability of large amounts of former farmland, which made possible the construction of many low-rise apartment complexes.

=== 21st century ===
The area continues to experience some of the highest growth rates in the Metropolitan Area of Nashville and Davidson County.

== Economy ==
The most important business concentration in Antioch is around the Commons at the Crossings, formerly Hickory Hollow Mall, which opened in 1978. As Hickory Hollow Mall, it was a regional shopping mall with a gross leasing area of 1,107,476 sq ft (102,887.9 m^{2}), more than 140 stores, and 5,795 parking spaces.

In 2014, Oldacre McDonald LLC, co-developer of Nashville West, purchased 300 acres (120 ha) of land in addition to the former 15-acre (61,000 m^{2}) Target site with plans to redevelop into a mixed-use space. Conn's HomePlus and Floor & Decor opened in the former Target location as the first retail tenants in the massive mixed-use project. Oldacre McDonald started work early in 2017, redeveloping the former Shoney's property to house a medical office and retail building. This location is considered a gateway property to the 300-acre (120 ha) Century Farms mixed-use development. Plans are being made to improve Hickory Hollow Parkway exit off I-24 to connect to the newly added Cane Ridge Parkway in the Oldacre development off Old Franklin Road.

Recently, there has been a fierce resurgence as the area redevelops to become Nashville's second largest employment center. Community Health Systems is building a shared service center to employ over 2,000 people on part of a 300-acre (120 ha) tract developed by Oldacre, McDonald LLC. Asurion, HCA Data Center, Drake Software, Tri-Star Physicians Plaza, Mac Papers, Brand Imaging Group, Calvary Logistics. Auto parts distributor LKQ Corp. (Nasdaq: LKQ) plans to invest $25 million in building a 100,000 sq ft (9,300 m^{2}) expanded regional office building in the Crossings Business District of Antioch in 2018. The duo of McArthur VanOsdale and Juan Vallarino, through their Nashville company V2 Capital, have paid $2.26 million for 19 acres (77,000 m^{2}) of land in Antioch primed for development that would include some combination of office buildings, a hotel and retail stores.

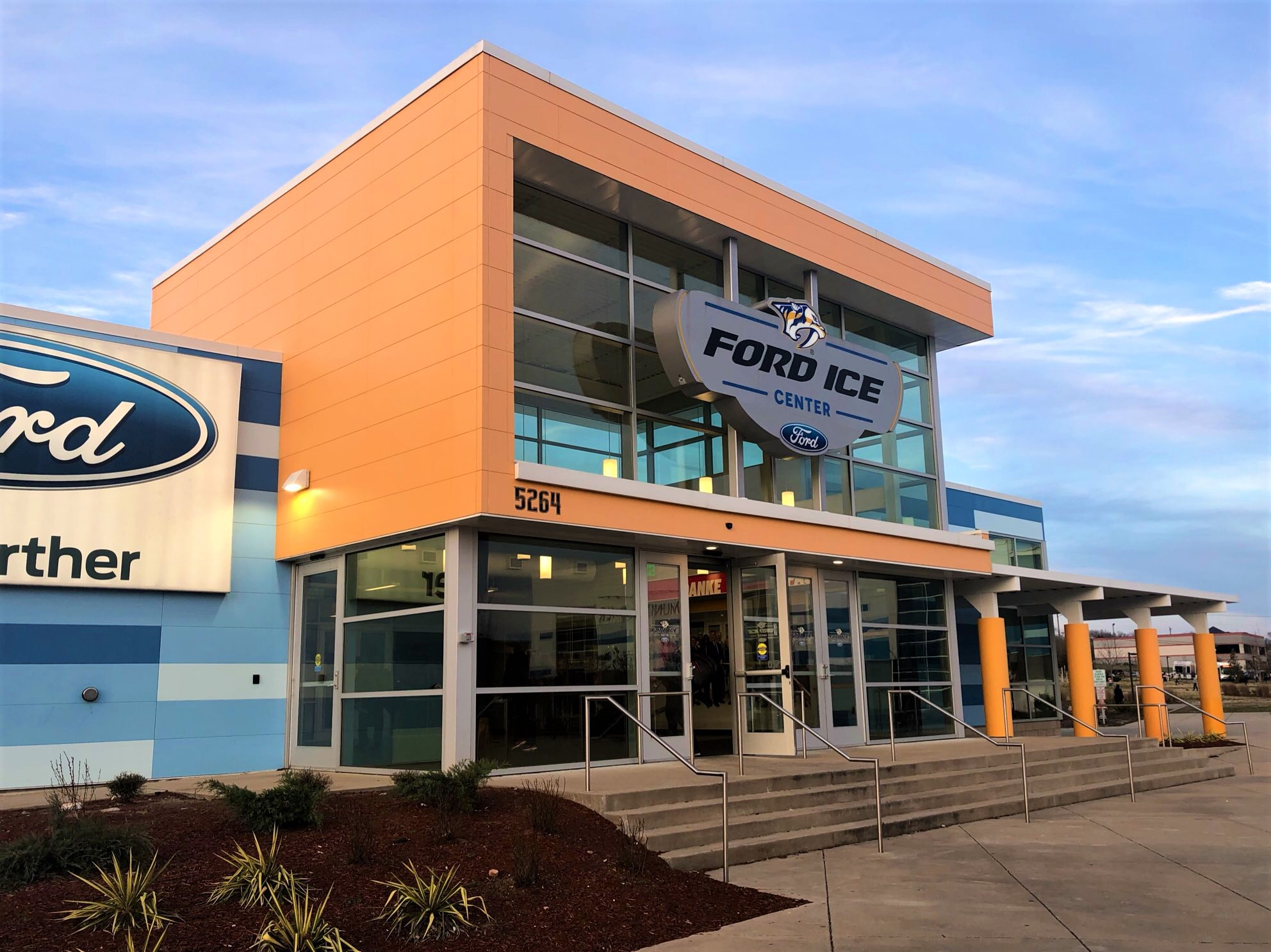
Ford Ice Center in Antioch, Tenn. in 2019

The former Hickory Hollow Mall Mall has been redeveloped and rebranded as the Commons at the Crossings. A combined state of the art 30,000 sq ft (2,800 m^{2}) library and 55,000 sq ft (5,100 m^{2}) recreation center now occupies the former JCPenney section of the mall. Nashville State Community College opened a southeast satellite campus at the former Dillard's building. The community college now has grown to over 3,000 students. The community college partners with Middle Tennessee State University to offer simultaneous enrollment and degree-completion programs. The Nashville Predators chose the former Antioch mall location to construct its first regional ice hockey facility. The Ford Ice Center is home to the Olympic gold medalist Scott Hamilton's Ice Skating Academy in addition to youth hockey play. Ford Ice Center has been operating at full capacity since its inception, making it one of the busiest rinks in North America. In addition to serving as a practice rink for the NHL Predators, the center also hosts collegiate hockey teams from Vanderbilt, David Lipscomb and MTSU. Most recently, Bridgestone North America moved to the redeveloped mall location housing its IT service center in the former Sears building and fully renovated the interior and updated the exterior. The struggling Global Mall at the Crossings occupies the interior of the old Hickory Hollow space. The State of Tennessee Department of Motor Vehicles placed a full-service driver license-testing station in Antioch. Metro greenway projects run along Mill Creek and plans are underway for a massive 600-acre (240 ha) park space on land that had been purchased by the Metro Parks department near Cane Ridge High School.

Starwood Amphitheatre, Nashville's former primary outdoor music venue, was located in Antioch, operating from 1986 to 2006. The amphitheatre closed prior to the 2007 season and has been demolished. Plans are in progress for a $100 million redevelopment project on the former Starwood site.

Antioch is the site of the denominational headquarters of the National Association of Free Will Baptists.

== Media ==
Antioch is served by Nashville's major media outlets including the daily newspaper The Tennessean and multiple radio and television stations.

== Education ==
Metropolitan Nashville Public School District is the school district for all of Davidson County.

== Notable residents ==
- Casey Atwood (born 1980), racing driver
- Coty Clarke (born 1992), basketball player in the Israeli Basketball Premier League
- Brandon Miller, NBA player
- Dave Ramsey (born 1960), personal finance personality, radio show host, author, and businessman
- Jelly Roll (born 1984), country artist and rapper
- Yelawolf, rapper spent most of childhood split between Antioch and Gadsden, Alabama
