= J. Percy Priest Dam =

Coordinates: 36°09′25″N 86°37′05″W

- Interactive map of J. Percy Priest Dam
- Country: United States
- Location: Tennessee
- Status: Operational
- Opening date: 1968
- Designed by: United States Army Corps of Engineers

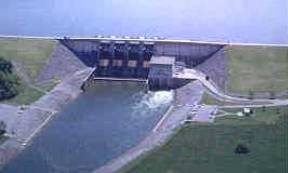
J. Percy Priest Dam forms Percy Priest Lake on the Stones River.

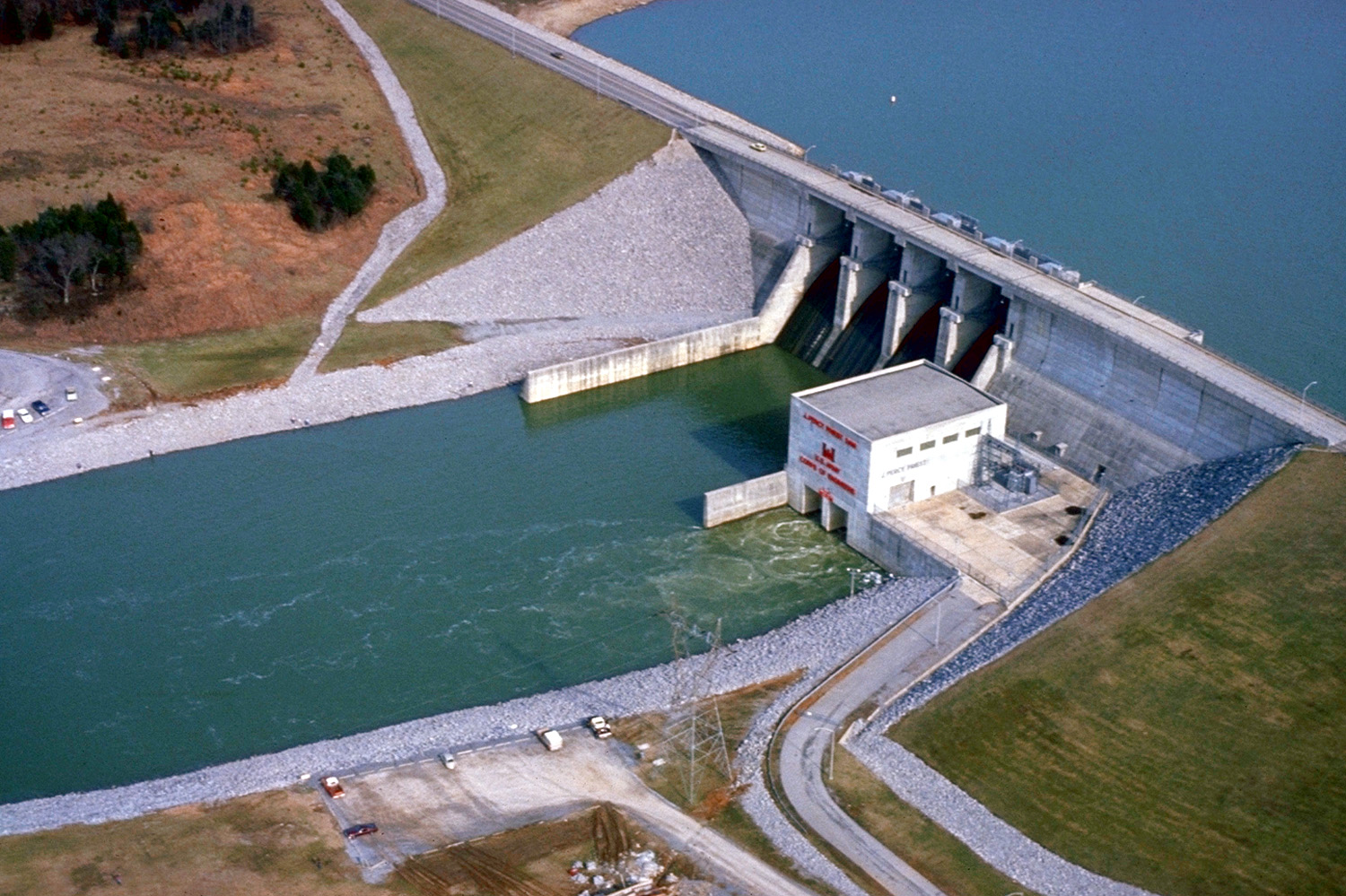
J. Percy Priest Dam and hydroelectric power plant

Schematic of J. Percy Priest dam, showing the pool levels at various stages of water storage.

J. Percy Priest Dam is a dam in north central Tennessee at river mile 6.8 of the Stones River, a tributary of the Cumberland. It is located about ten miles (16 km) east of downtown Nashville. The reservoir behind the dam is Percy Priest Lake. It is one of four major flood control reservoirs for the Cumberland; the others being Wolf Creek Dam, Dale Hollow Dam, and Center Hill Dam.

The Flood Control Act of 1946 commissioned the construction of a project under the name “Stewarts Ferry Reservoir”. Public Law 85-496, approved July 2, 1958, changed the name to J. Percy Priest in honor of the late Congressman from Tennessee. Construction began June 2, 1963 and the dam was completed in 1968. The dam was built under U.S. Army Corps of Engineers supervision.

In 1979 the dam was bombed with dynamite as ruse to cover a crime spree supposed to have taken place in the resultant massive flooding. The conspirators succeeded only in destroying some iron doors at the dam's base. The suspects were later convicted and sentenced to substantial prison terms.

Rising 130 feet (40 m) above the streambed, the combination earth and concrete-gravity dam is 2,716 feet (828 m) long with a hydroelectric power plant generating 28 MW of electrical power. The dam has contributed significantly in reducing the frequency and severity of flooding in the Cumberland Valley. In addition to the far-reaching effects of flood control, the project contributes to the available electric power supply of the area.

The dam is easily visible from Interstate 40 where it crosses the Stones River.

The completion of the dam in 1967 resulted in the destruction of the last known population of the freshwater mussel Epioblasma lenior, which is now extinct.

== Reservoir Elevation (behind the dam) ==
(elevations are in feet above sea level)

504.50 ft The dam can hold flood waters up to this level

494.50 ft Elm Hill Marina begins to flood by surpassing the individual walkways to the boat docks

494.50 ft Hamilton Creek Sailboat Marina begins to flood by surpassing the primary walkway to the sailboat docks

490.00 ft Summer Pool (April to October)

483.00 ft Winter Pool (November to March)

480.00 ft Permanent Pool

== Hourly discharge ==
The Tennessee Valley Authority (TVA) reports all discharge information online viewable to the public. Current elevations and hourly discharge information can be found at: www.tva.gov/lakes/jph_o.htm

It has been found that if J Percy Priest dam is discharging up to 9,000 cu ft/s (250 m^{3}/s) it takes about 28 hours for the reservoir elevation to recede 1-foot (0.30 m).

Electricity from the dam is marketed by the Southeastern Power Administration.
