= Hermitage, Tennessee =

Hermitage
- Neighborhood
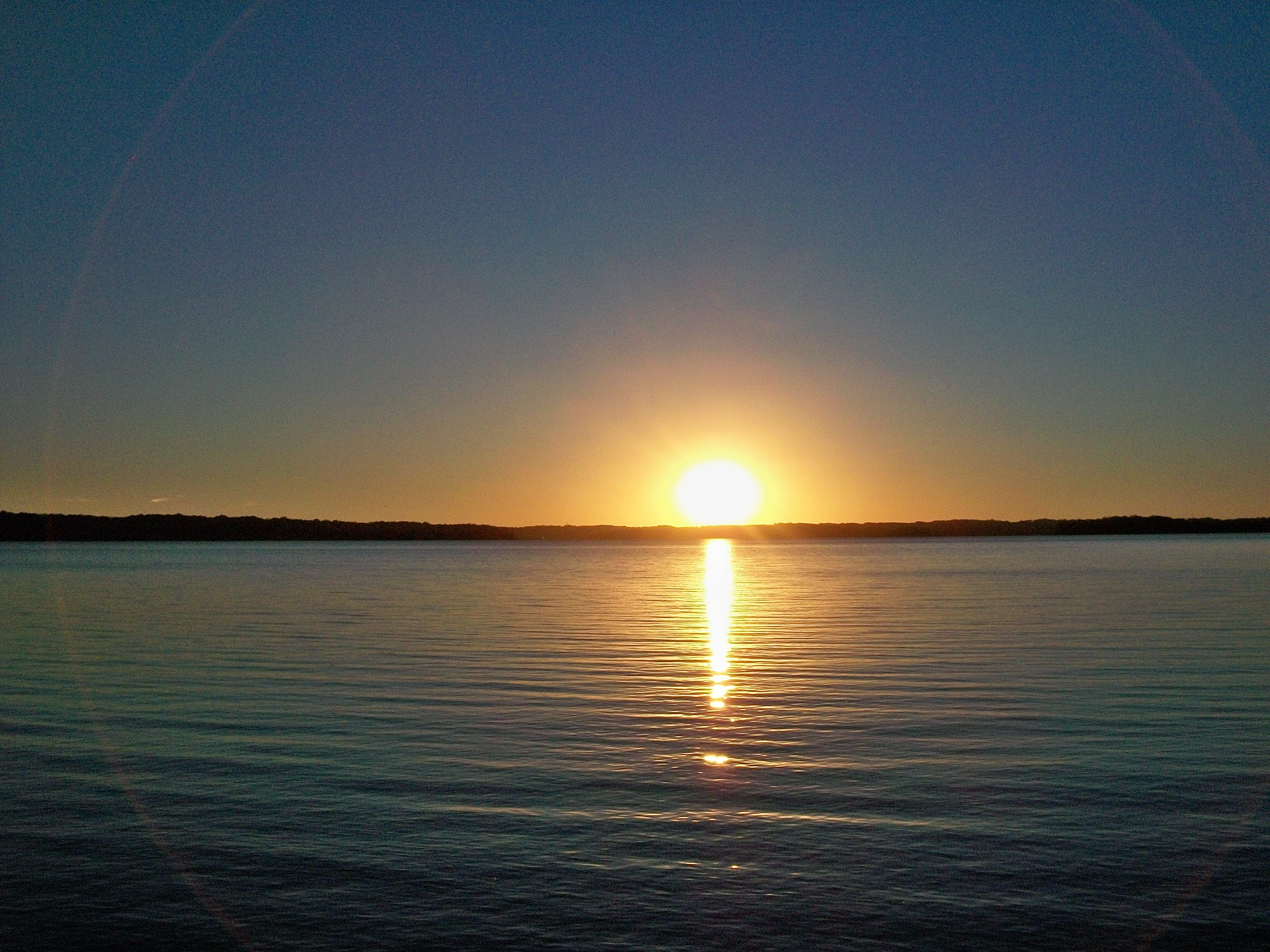
- Sunset at Seven Points Campground on Percy Priest Lake Hermitage, TN

- Location within Tennessee Location within the United States
- Coordinates: 36°11′56″N 86°37′11″W
- Country: United States
- State: Tennessee
- County: Davidson
- City: Nashville
- Time zone: UTC-6 (Central (CST))
  - Summer (DST): UTC-5 (CDT)
- Zip code: 37076
- Area codes: 615, 629

Hermitage is a neighborhood of Nashville, adjacent to – and named in honor of – The Hermitage, the historic home of Andrew Jackson, seventh President of the United States. Although the area is incorporated as part of the Metropolitan Government of Nashville and Davidson County, it maintains its own identity as a residential and commercial suburban area.

Hermitage is located immediately to the east of Donelson, a Nashville borough named in honor of Andrew Jackson's father-in-law John Donelson, and just to the west of Mt. Juliet in adjacent Wilson County. Once a rural area, Hermitage is now a thriving district with a highly developed network of retail stores and typical suburban tract houses, ranging from the "starter home" to the "executive residence". The technology headquarters of Deloitte Touche Tohmatsu, one of the Big Four auditors, is located in Hermitage, sprawling across 200,000 square feet (19,000 m^{2}) and employing more than 1,000 people.

Major thoroughfares include U.S. Route 70, Interstate 40, and State Route 45. Hermitage has a station on the WeGo Star commuter rail service and is home to the Tennessee Secondary School Athletic Association, the organization that administers junior and senior high school sporting events.

Hermitage is divided from Donelson by the Stones River and its bottom lands, Clover Bottom. It has benefited from the impoundment of the Stones by J. Percy Priest Dam, a nearby United States Army Corps of Engineers project that provides a number of recreation opportunities, particularly in the summer months. The dam has also contributed to the desirability and value of the area's real estate. Hermitage and Donelson are often thought of as something of a unit and even have a joint Chamber of Commerce and Christmas parade.

Hermitage is generally considered to be roughly included in United States Postal Service ZIP code 37076. The 2016 population estimate is 37,814.

== See also ==
- Hermitage station
- Presidency of Andrew Jackson
