= Interstate 55 in Tennessee =

Interstate Highway in Tennessee, United States

Interstate 55
- Bishop J. O. Patterson Sr. Memorial Parkway; W.B. Fowler Sr. Expressway
- I-55 highlighted in red

Route information
- Maintained by TDOT
- Length: 12.28 mi (19.76 km)
- Existed: August 14, 1957–present
- History: Completed April 20, 1967
- NHS: Entire route

Major junctions
- South end: I-55 / I-69 at the Mississippi state line in Southaven, MS
- US 51 in Memphis; I-240 in Memphis; US 61 / US 64 / US 70 / US 78 / US 79 in Memphis
- North end: I-55 / US 61 / US 64 / US 70 / US 78 / US 79 at the Arkansas state line in Memphis

Location
- Country: United States
- State: Tennessee
- Counties: Shelby

Highway system
- Interstate Highway System; Main; Auxiliary; Suffixed; Business; Future; Tennessee State Routes; Interstate; US; State
← SR 54	→ SR 55

Interstate 55 (I-55) is part of the Interstate Highway System that runs from LaPlace, Louisiana, to Chicago, Illinois. In the state of Tennessee, the Interstate is located entirely within the state's second-largest city of Memphis, running 12.28 miles (19.76 km) from the Mississippi state line in the Whitehaven neighborhood to the Arkansas border across the Mississippi River. Of the six states that the Interstate passes through, the segment in Tennessee is the shortest, as well as the shortest mainline Interstate segment in Tennessee. I-55 serves a number of neighborhoods and industrial areas in the southwestern portion of Memphis, and also provides access to the Memphis International Airport, the second-busiest cargo airport in the world.

I-55 is known as the Bishop J. O. Patterson Sr. Memorial Parkway and the W.B. Fowler Sr. Expressway in Tennessee. The Interstate utilizes the Memphis & Arkansas Bridge across the Mississippi River. Completed in 1949, this is the oldest bridge on the Interstate Highway System in Tennessee and the oldest bridge on I-55. The remainder of the route was constructed between 1958 and 1967, making it the first mainline Interstate Highway in Tennessee to be completed. The route also had an auxiliary Interstate, I-255, which was renumbered as an extension of I-240 in 1973. Since its construction, the Interstate has seen a number of expansion and improvement projects, with additional ones planned for the future.

== Route description ==
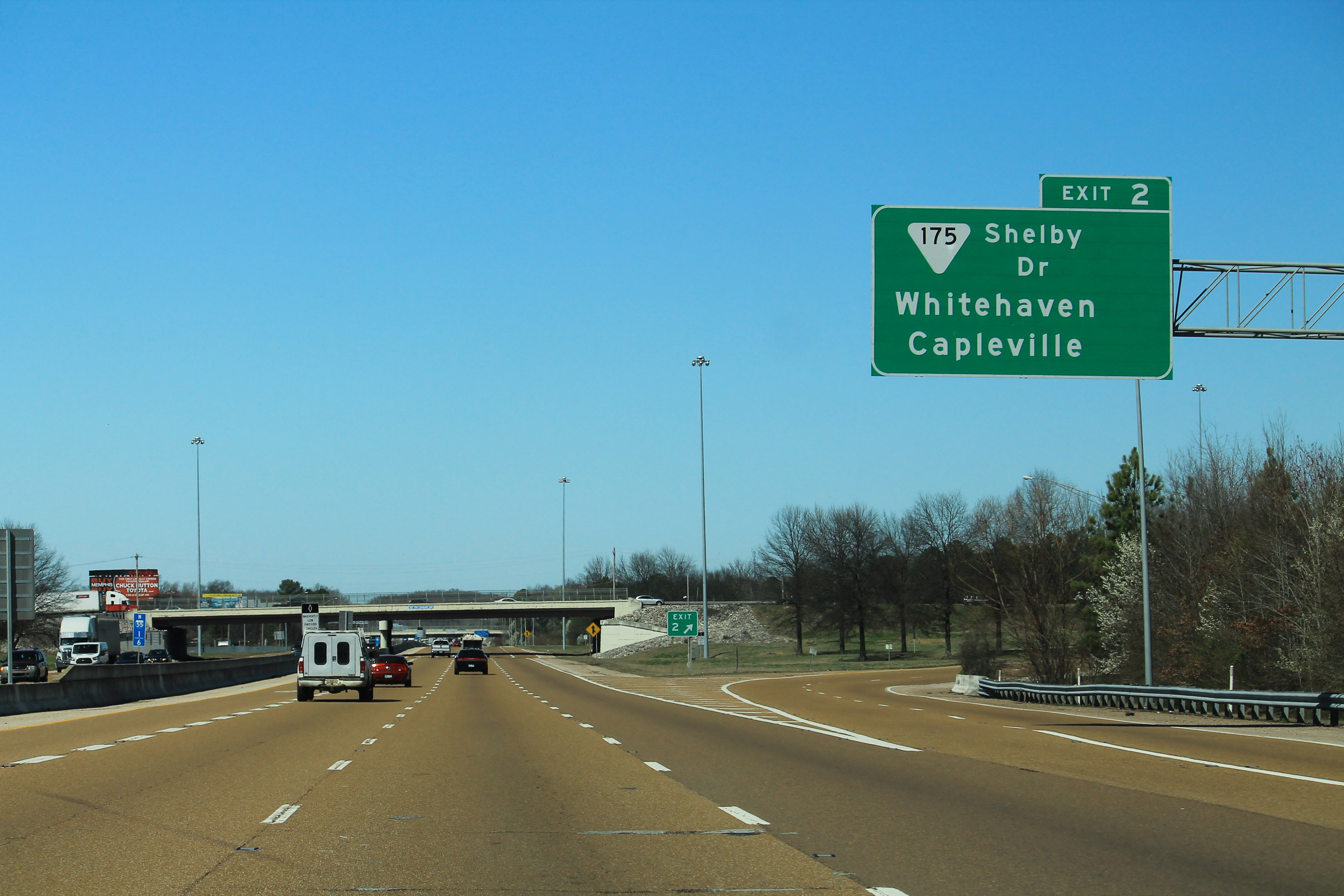
I-55 northbound in the Whitehaven neighborhood in Memphis

I-55 is maintained by the Tennessee Department of Transportation (TDOT), along with all other Interstate, U.S., and state highways in Tennessee. In 2025, annual average daily traffic (AADT) volumes ranged from 110,615 vehicles per day between U.S. Route 51 (US 51) and I-240 and 36,764 vehicles per day at the Arkansas state line.

I-55 enters Tennessee from Southaven, Mississippi, in the Whitehaven neighborhood of southwestern Memphis, with the northern ramps from the northernmost Mississippi exit extending into Tennessee. Traveling in a direct north-south alignment, this stretch of the freeway carries eight lanes, with the leftmost lanes serving as high-occupancy vehicle (HOV) lanes during rush hour. The first interchange is with State Route 175 (SR 175, Shelby Drive). The Interstate then passes west of the Memphis International Airport, the second-busiest cargo airport in the world, and shifts to the northwest, where the northbound Tennessee Welcome Center is located. A short distance later is a complex interchange with Brooks Road and US 51 (Elvis Presley Boulevard) near Graceland, the home of Elvis Presley. Gradually turning north, the HOV restrictions terminate and the Interstate crosses Nonconnah Creek before reaching a two-level cloverstack interchange with Interstate 240. Here, a pair of ramps carry I-55's traffic through the interchange into an east-west alignment, and I-240 shifts from a north-south alignment heading from Downtown and Midtown Memphis to an east-west direction through the southern neighborhoods of the city.

Carrying between four and six lanes for its remaining length in Tennessee, I-55 first crosses a series of railroads serving an industrial area to the north, and has a three-level cloverstack interchange with US 61 (Third Street). Passing to the north of a levee, the freeway then gradually turns to the north, where it crosses another railroad before reaching a single-point urban interchange (SPUI) with Mallory Avenue adjacent to an oil refinery operated by Valero Energy. Passing west of the Riverside neighborhood, the Interstate has an interchange with South Parkway, part of the historic Memphis Parkway System before reaching an interchange with McLemore Avenue near the eastern end of the President's Island peninsula on the Mississippi River and crossing another railroad. Traveling northeastward for a brief distance, the Interstate reaches a complex interchange with US 61/64/70/78/79 (Crump Boulevard) and Riverside Drive, where it begins a concurrency with these U.S. routes. Here, the freeway turns directly westward, with a pair of flyover bridges carrying I-55 traffic through the interchange, and the ramps connect to the surface streets via a large roundabout. The freeway then turns slightly northwest and crosses the Mississippi River on the Memphis & Arkansas Bridge, where it enters Arkansas.

== History ==
=== Predecessor highways and bridges ===
In the 19th century a number of trails connected Memphis with surrounding areas. In 1915, the Tennessee Department of Highways and Public Works, the predecessor agency to TDOT, was established, and tasked with designating a state highway system. That year, they designated the Memphis to Bristol Highway, which ran approximately 540 miles (870 km) from Memphis to Bristol in the northeastern corner of the state. On October 1, 1923, the highway department established the state's numbered highway system. The Memphis to Bristol Highway was designated as State Route 1 (SR 1); the road between Memphis and Vicksburg, Mississippi, was designated as part of SR 14; the main road connecting Memphis with Jackson, Mississippi, and New Orleans, Louisiana, was designated as SR 3; and the road running southeast of Memphis to Birmingham, Alabama, was established as SR 4. When the United States Numbered Highway System was established on November 11, 1926, these routes were designated as U.S. Routes 70, 61, 51, and 78, respectively.

The Frisco Bridge was the first bridge across the Mississippi River to be constructed in Memphis, as well as the first crossing of the Lower Mississippi River. Completed in 1892, this bridge carried a single track of the Kansas City, Fort Scott and Memphis Railway, which was later acquired by the St. Louis–San Francisco Railway. The Frisco bridge was joined by the Harahan Bridge in 1916, a double-track bridge which was jointly constructed by the Rock Island, Iron Mountain, and Cotton Belt railroads. This bridge contained a series of wagonways that opened the following year and carried automobile traffic. By the late 1920s, these wagonways had become congested, and the need for a new bridge exclusively carrying automobile traffic became apparent. Preliminary planning was delayed by the Great Depression, and did not begin until the creation of the joint Memphis and Arkansas Bridge committee on March 14, 1939. This committee was headed by then-Memphis mayor and political boss E. H. Crump, and included Congressman Walter Chandler and U.S. Senator Kenneth McKellar. The plans also included a new street leading up to the bridge bypassing both Downtown Memphis and historic African American neighborhoods to the south. This street became known as Crump Boulevard. Engineering firm Modjeski and Masters, who also helped design the Frisco and Harahan bridges, was hired on May 19, 1944, and construction of the bridge began on September 12, 1945. Work on Crump Boulevard began in September 1948. On December 17, 1949, the Memphis & Arkansas Bridge and Crump Boulevard opened to traffic.

=== Interstate Highway planning and construction ===
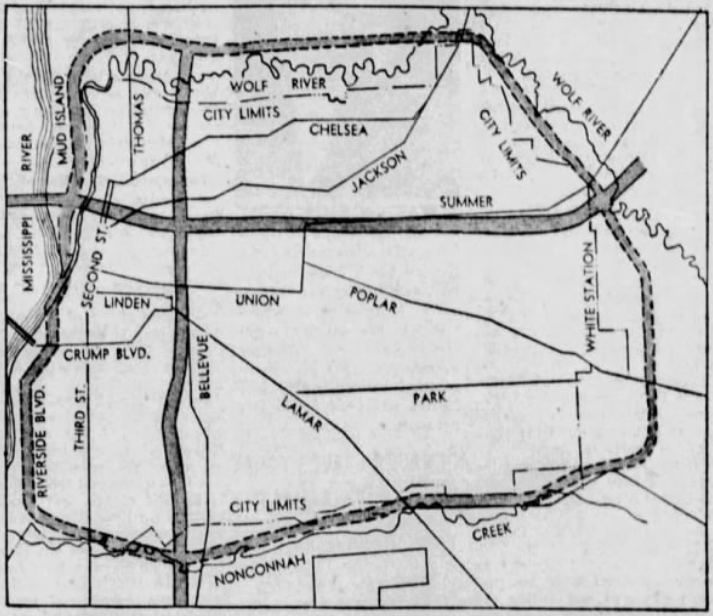
A map produced by The Commercial Appeal in 1955 showing the proposed system of freeways in Memphis. The leg between Crump Boulevard and the central north-south route was removed upon objection from the Bureau of Public Roads.

The highway that is now I-55 had its origins in the late 1930s, when the federal government began planning for a national "superhighway" system. A 1939 report titled Toll Roads and Free Roads and published by the Bureau of Public Roads (BPR), the predecessor agency to the Federal Highway Administration (FHWA), recommended a controlled-access highway connect Memphis with Jackson, Mississippi, to the south, and Chicago to the north. This routing was affirmed in the National Interregional Highway Committee's 1944 report, titled Interregional Highways. Three years later, a plan produced by the Public Roads Administration of the now-defunct Federal Works Agency recommended the freeway cross the Mississippi River in Memphis into Arkansas, and run through St. Louis before reaching Chicago. A plan for Memphis' freeway system produced in 1955 recommended that a north-south freeway enter the city in the Whitehaven community, and intersect with an east-west route in Midtown. A loop encircling the city was also planned, which would interchange with the north-south route directly north of Nonconnah Creek, and run along the riverfront, crossing Crump Boulevard and the east-west route, before crossing Mud Island and intersecting with the northern terminus of the north-south route. By July 1956, the freeway between Crump Boulevard and the north-south freeway north of town had been cancelled due to opposition from the Bureau of Public Roads, which resulted in the freeway being rerouted across the Memphis & Arkansas Bridge. This would result in the bridge becoming the oldest bridge on the Interstate Highway System in Tennessee. The Federal-Aid Highway Act of 1956 established the Interstate Highway System and allocated a total of 1,047.6 miles (1,685.9 km) of Interstate Highways to Tennessee, including the freeway that would become I-55. The numbering was approved by the American Association of State Highway Officials on August 14, 1957, for the north-south freeway between the Mississippi state line and the interchange adjacent to Nonconnah Creek, and the original loop route between this interchange and the Mississippi River.

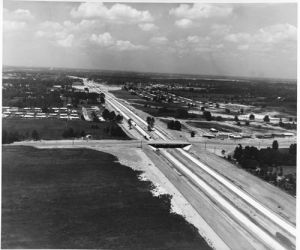
I-55 near the Mississippi state line in the early 1960s, looking north

The first segment of I-55 to begin construction after the passage of the Federal-Aid Highway Act was the interchange with I-240, along with a short stretch of that route east of the interchange. A contract for this project was awarded on July 25, 1958. The section between the Mississippi state line and US 51/Brooks Road was awarded in two smaller segments on June 26, 1959, and October 30, 1959, and was opened to traffic on December 2, 1961. This was the first completed freeway segment in Memphis. On December 15, 1962, the short section between US 51/Brooks Road and I-240, along with an adjacent section of I-240 to the east, was dedicated and opened to traffic. The section between I-240 and east of US 61 (Third Street) was let on February 16, 1962, and the adjacent section extending to Horn Lake Road was awarded on December 13, 1963. The section between Horn Lake Road and South Parkway was let on February 28, 1964. On March 18, 1966, the section between I-240 and US 61 was dedicated and opened. The section between US 61 and South Parkway was dedicated and opened on October 14, 1966. Work on the last section, located between South Parkway and the Memphis & Arkansas Bridge and which consisted of upgrading the reused stretch of Crump Boulevard between the bridge and the cloverleaf interchange to freeway standards, began on September 11, 1964, and was opened on April 20, 1967. I-55 was the first mainline Interstate Highway in Tennessee to be completed.

=== Later history ===
==== Crump Interchange reconstruction ====
As traffic volumes grew, the cloverleaf interchange with Crump Boulevard gradually became inadequate, leading to congestion and a high accident rate. The design required I-55 northbound traffic to utilize a loop ramp with a 25 mph (40 km/h) design speed to pass through the interchange. Southbound traffic used a one-lane ramp in order to remain on I-55. Originally, northbound traffic had to merge onto a one-lane loop with a tight radius while traffic going from I-55 southbound to Riverside Drive merged into traffic on another loop ramp. A temporary solution was put into effect in 2011 by widening the northbound loop to two lanes, eliminating the loop ramp between I-55 southbound and Riverside Drive, and creating a left turn lane for this traffic. This eliminated having to make a lane change in order to stay on I-55 northbound. In June 2021, a second lane was added for the I-55 southbound ramp in response to increased traffic resulting from the Hernando de Soto Bridge closure. The FHWA first approved a draft environmental impact statement for the reconstruction project on March 25, 2009. Two initial plans were developed that would have required the demolition of eight homes in the predominately African American French Fort neighborhood, but after input from residents, two additional designs were created to shift the I-55 lanes to the east in order to avoid this. These designs also included a roundabout between Crump Boulevard, Riverside Drive, and Alson Avenue at the location of the cloverleaf interchange. The FHWA approved the final environmental impact statement on June 28, 2011, and a record of decision for the final design, called Alternative Z-1, on January 25, 2012.

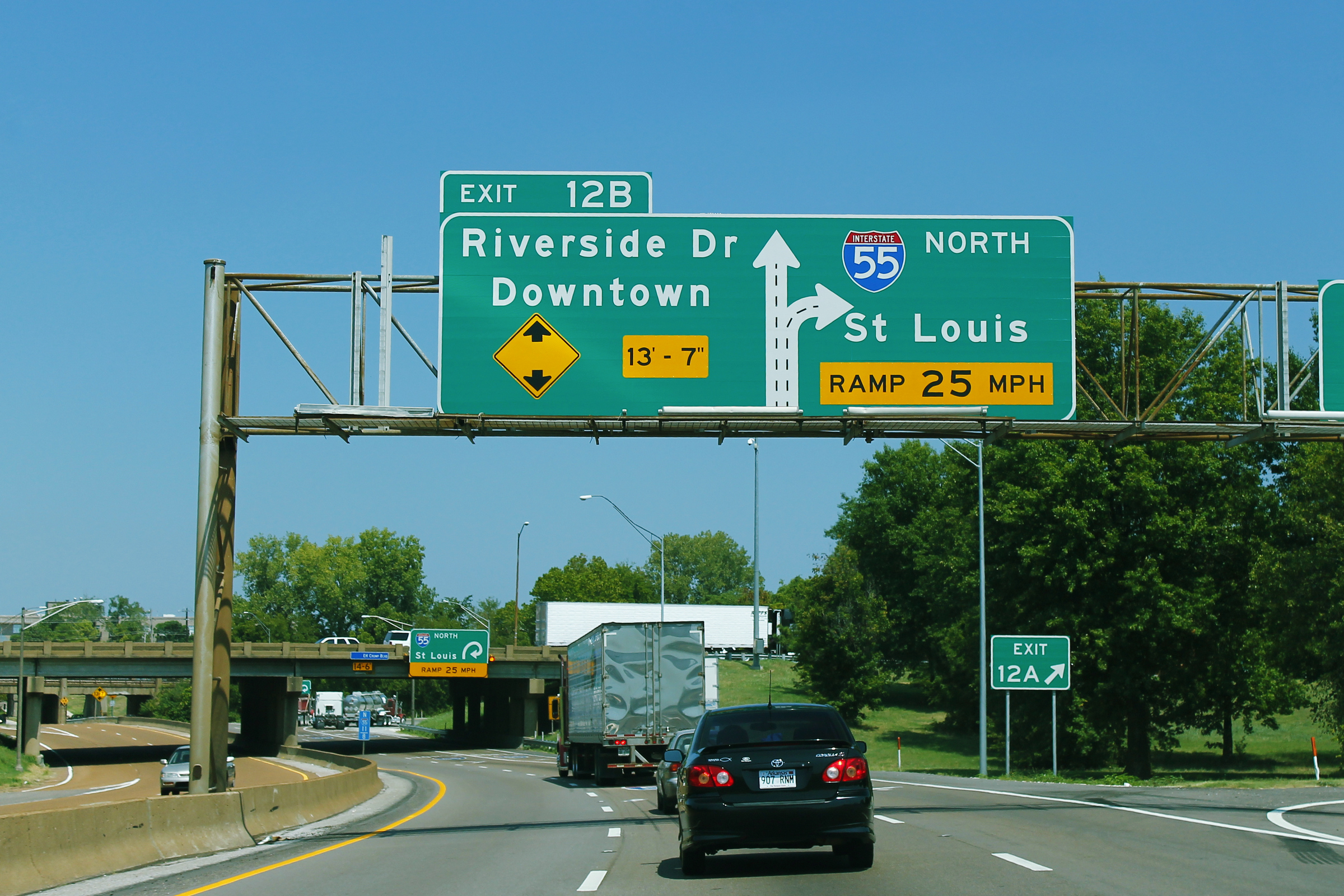
I-55 northbound approaching the original configuration of the Crump interchange

The final design included construction of a flyover bridge to carry I-55 traffic through the interchange, with ramps providing access to the roundabout. In addition, the interchange with Metal Museum Drive was eliminated, a new Wisconsin Street overpass was constructed, noise walls were erected, and the Memphis & Arkansas Bridge was repaired. The project which was expected to cost $32.4 million in 2014, was first delayed that year due to a shortage of federal transportation funds. On May 27, 2015, TDOT announced plans to close the Memphis & Arkansas Bridge for nine months as part of the project, beginning in early 2017. This drew considerable backlash from residents, businesses, and government officials in the Memphis area, prompting TDOT to reconsider their plans for construction and further delay the project. At the time, bidding for the project was scheduled for December 2015. On July 24, 2015, TDOT announced that they would no longer pursue a long-term closure of the bridge, and would conduct more detailed studies on how to implement construction over the next year. On March 30, 2022, TDOT awarded a $141.2 million contract for the project. The project shortened the closure time of the Memphis & Arkansas Bridge to two weeks. Preliminary work began on May 3, 2022, and construction began on June 13, after being postponed for seven days due to inclement weather. The revamped interchange was dedicated in a ceremony by Governor Bill Lee on May 6, 2025.

==== Memphis & Arkansas Bridge replacement ====
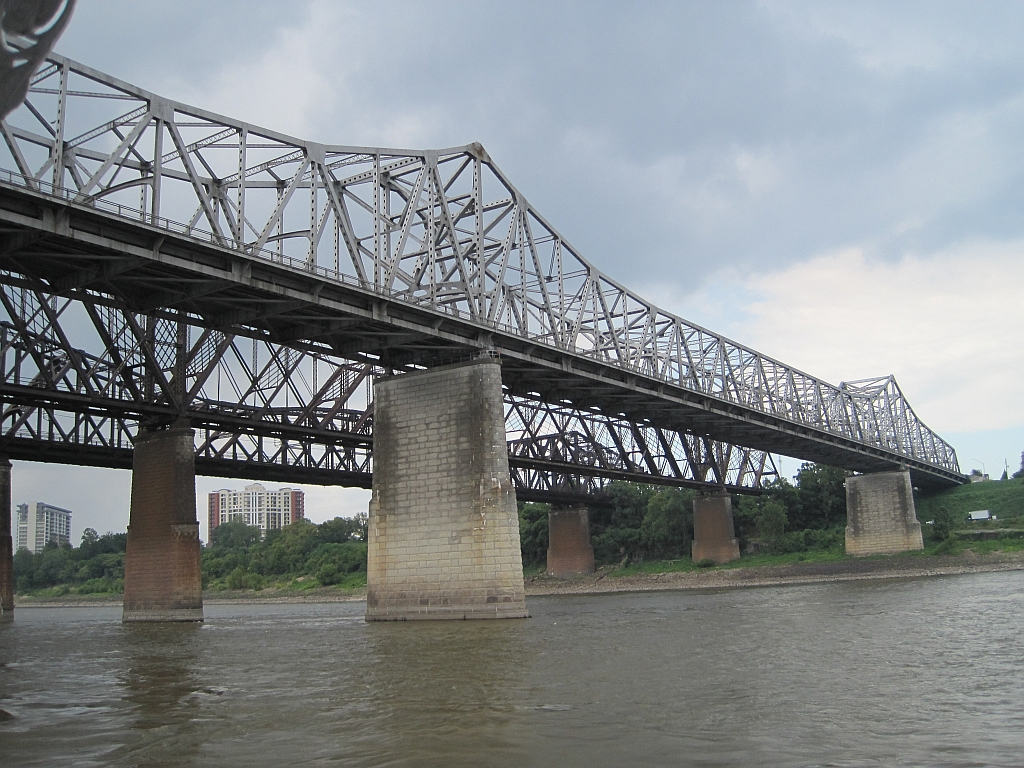
The Memphis & Arkansas Bridge, completed in 1949, carries I-55 across the Mississippi River between Tennessee and Arkansas

Since the early 1990s, leaders in the Memphis area have projected an eventual need for a third highway bridge across the Mississippi River in the area due to increasing traffic volumes. In addition, the need to eventually replace the Memphis & Arkansas Bridge on I-55 has been recognized, due to its age and the fact that it does not meet Interstate Highway standards. The bridge is also located within the New Madrid Seismic Zone, one of the most seismically active regions in North America, and was not designed to withstand a high magnitude earthquake. In 2006, TDOT commissioned a feasibility study on the possibility of constructing an additional bridge across the Mississippi River in Memphis. This explored the possibility of constructing a third bridge to relieve congestion on the Memphis & Arkansas Bridge and the nearby Hernando de Soto Bridge on I-40, as well as replacing the former entirely. A study was conducted in 2009 on the possibility of a toll bridge across the river, and on January 11, 2011, TDOT completed a study on the possibility of a new rail and auto bridge in Memphis, which was known as the "Southern Gateway Project". In February 2014, TDOT completed a cost benefit analysis on this project. This project reportedly faded away due to cost and an inability of the communities in the Memphis area to agree on a location for the bridge.

The need for a new bridge was once again thrust into the spotlight when the Hernando de Soto bridge was closed to all traffic between May 11 and August 2, 2021, due to a fracture in the structure. This forced much of the traffic on I-40 to detour across the Memphis & Arkansas Bridge. Later that year, the Infrastructure Investment and Jobs Act (IIJA) was enacted by Congress. This legislation includes the Bridge Investment Program (BIP), which provides $7.25 billion in federal funding until 2026 for bridge projects costing over $100 million. These projects are awarded in competitive grants at 50% of the total cost. On April 17, 2023, Governor Bill Lee signed into law the Transportation Modernization Act, which provides increased funding for highway projects in Tennessee. Six months later TDOT and the Arkansas Department of Transportation (ARDOT) completed a study on the possibility of a new bridge in Memphis, which found that replacing the Memphis & Arkansas bridge would be the most cost-effective option. On December 4, 2023, TDOT and ARDOT jointly submitted an application for a grant under the BIP to replace the Memphis & Arkansas Bridge. Under the terms of the application, TDOT and ARDOT have agreed to each pay for 25% of the total cost of the bridge, which is tentatively expected to cost $787.5 million, although the final figure could be higher. On July 12, 2024, a $394 million grant was awarded for the replacement. This project, which has been named "America's River Crossing", is tentatively planned to begin in 2026.

==== Other history ====
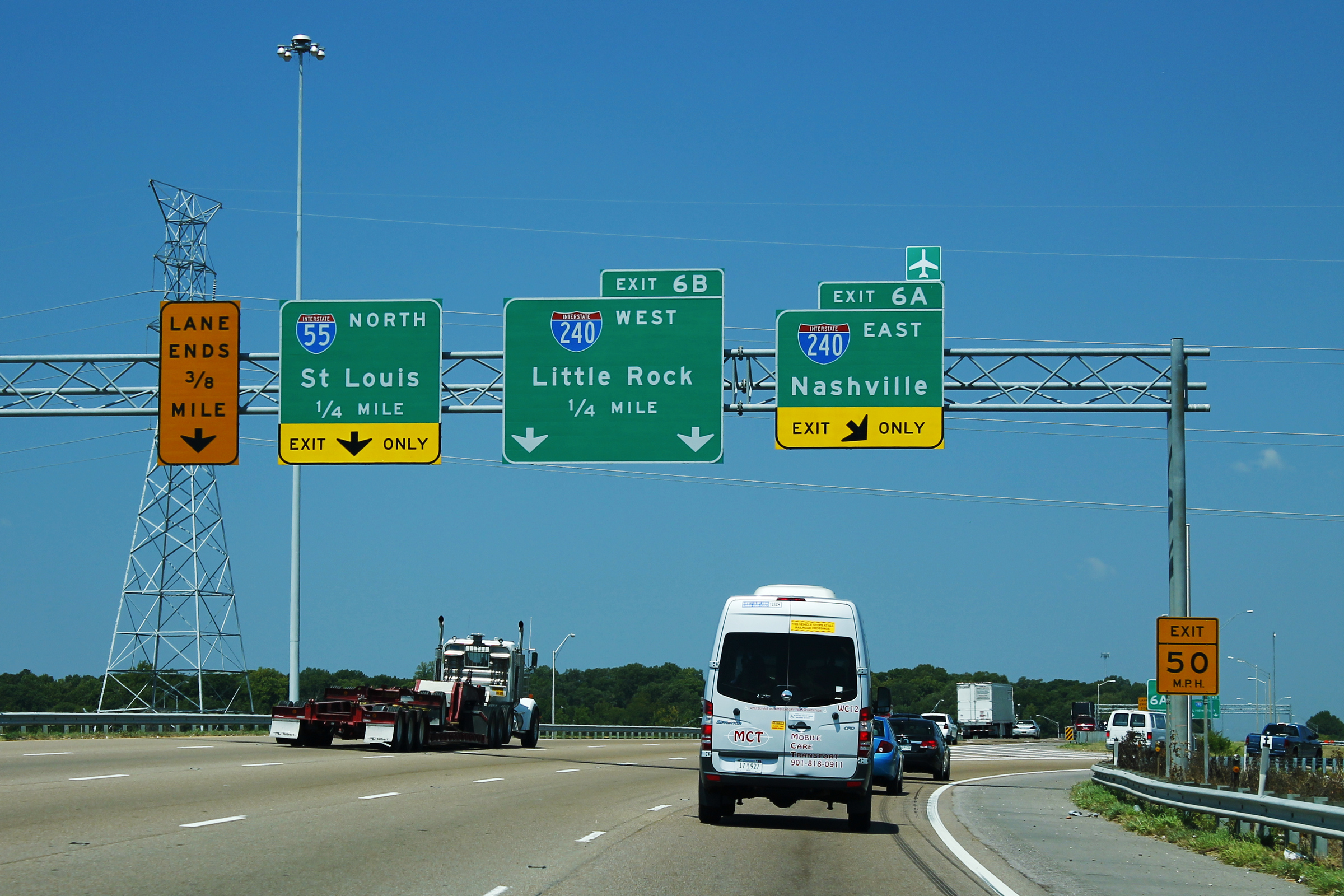
I-55 northbound at the interchange with I-240

I-55 was widened from four to eight lanes between the Mississippi state line and the I-240 interchange in two phases. The first phase, which took place between February 1999 and June 2001, widened the section between Winchester Road and I-240. The second phase, which ran from early 2000 to July 2002, extended the widening south to the state line. In May 2008, work began on a project to reconfigure the interchange with Mallory Avenue from a partial cloverleaf interchange into a single-point urban interchange. As part of this project, I-55 was widened to six lanes through the interchange, and new bridges were constructed over Mallory Lane, a railyard serving the Valero refinery, and Paul L. Lowery Road. Initially slated for completion in late 2010, the project experienced multiple delays, and was not completed until December 2012.

An extension of Interstate 69 through Tennessee was proposed under the 1991 Intermodal Surface Transportation Efficiency Act (ISTEA) as part of a corridor to facilitate trade between Canada and Mexico. This extension was further spearheaded by the enactment of the North American Free Trade Agreement (NAFTA) in 1994. This extension, sometimes considered part of the unofficial NAFTA superhighway, was proposed to utilize the section of I-55 between the Mississippi border and I-240, and continue north along that route. On January 18, 2008, the FHWA authorized Mississippi and Tennessee to sign I-69 between an interchange on I-55 in Hernando, Mississippi, and the I-40/SR 300 interchange in north Memphis. Tennessee has not signed the extension of the route, although Mississippi has already done so. It is unclear, however, if the route will ever be built through Memphis. In November 2023, the American Association of State Highway and Transportation Officials (AASHTO) approved an extension of US 78 into Arkansas, which utilizes I-55 between the Memphis & Arkansas Bridge and the Crump interchange.

== Honorary designations ==
The section of I-55 between the Arkansas state line and I-240, along with part of I-240 to the east, was named the "W.B. Fowler Sr. Expressway" by the Memphis City Commission in 1960 in honor of William B. Fowler, who served as city engineer between 1919 and 1962. The portion between the Mississippi state line and I-240 was named the "Bishop J. O. Patterson Sr. Memorial Parkway" by the Tennessee General Assembly in 1995 in honor of J. O. Patterson Sr., who served as presiding bishop of the Memphis-based Church of God in Christ from 1968 until his death in 1989. On August 20, 2025, TDOT and ARDOT announced that the new Mississippi River bridge will be named "Kings' Crossing". This name honors civil rights leader Martin Luther King Jr., who was assassinated in Memphis in 1968; blues musician B. B. King, who was known as the "King of the Blues" and lived and recorded music in Memphis; and singer and actor Elvis Presley, who was known as the "King of Rock and Roll" and also lived and recorded music in Memphis.

== Exit list ==
The entire route is in Shelby County.

Location	mi	km	Exit	Destinations	Notes
Tennessee–Mississippi line	0.00	0.00		I-55 south / I-69 south – Jackson, MS	Continuation into Mississippi
Tennessee–Mississippi line	0.00	0.00	291	Southaven	Southbound exit and northbound entrance each extend into Tennessee; exit number is based on Mississippi mileage; access via Main St./Stateline Rd.
Memphis	1.68	2.70	2	SR 175 (Shelby Drive) – Whitehaven, Capleville	Signed as exits 2A (east) and 2B (west) southbound; formerly signed as exits 2A (east) and 2B (west) northbound
Memphis	4.66– 4.93	7.50– 7.93	5	US 51 (Elvis Presley Boulevard/SR 3) / Brooks Road – Graceland	Signed as exits 5A (Brooks Road) and 5B (US 51 south) southbound
Memphis	5.13– 6.076	8.26– 9.778	6	I-240 – Nashville, Little Rock, Memphis International Airport	Signed as exits 6A (east) and 6B (north); north end of future I-69 overlap
Memphis	7.50	12.07	7	US 61 (3rd Street/SR 14) – Clarksdale, Greenville, Vicksburg	No southbound access to US 61 north
Memphis	7.88	12.68	8	Horn Lake Road	Southbound exit and northbound entrance
Memphis	9.01	14.50	9	Mallory Avenue	
Memphis	10.35	16.66	10	South Parkway	
Memphis	10.96	17.64	11	McLemore Avenue - President's Island	
Memphis	11.41– 11.77	18.36– 18.94	12	US 61 south / US 64 east / US 70 east / US 78 east / US 79 north (Crump Boulevard/Riverside Drive/SR 1 east)	South end of US 61/US 64/US 70/US 78/US 79/SR 1 overlap; former cloverleaf interchange, formerly exits 12A-B
Memphis	11.77	18.94	12C	Metal Museum Drive	Served the National Ornamental Metal Museum; right-in/right-out southbound; removed during 2022-2025 reconstruction
Mississippi River	12.28	19.76	Memphis & Arkansas Bridge		
Mississippi River	12.28	19.76		I-55 north (US 61 north / US 64 west / US 70 west / US 78 west / US 79 south) – West Memphis, St. Louis, Little Rock SR 1 ends	Continuation into Arkansas; western terminus of SR 1
1.000 mi = 1.609 km; 1.000 km = 0.621 mi: Closed/former; Concurrency terminus; Incomplete access

== Auxiliary routes ==
The stretch of I-240 extending from north of the I-55/I-240 interchange to I-40 in downtown Memphis was originally numbered I-255. This section of highway opened in segments between 1965 and 1971. On November 1, 1971, the Tennessee Department of Highways sent a request to the FHWA to renumber I-255 as part of I-240, which was approved by AASHTO on November 10, 1973. I-155 is an auxiliary Interstate Highway that begins at a junction with I-55 in southeast Missouri, and crosses the Mississippi River on the Caruthersville Bridge into northwest Tennessee, before terminating in Dyersburg, about 80 miles (130 km) north of Memphis.

== See also ==
Interstate 55
Previous state: Mississippi	Tennessee	Next state: Arkansas
