= U.S. Route 78 in Tennessee =

Segment of U.S. Highway in Tennessee

U.S. Route 78

Route information
- Maintained by TDOT
- Length: 15.90 mi (25.59 km)
- Existed: November 11, 1926–present

Major junctions
- West end: I-55 / US 61 / US 64 / US 70 / US 78 / US 79 at the Arkansas state line
- I-55 in Memphis; US 61 / US 64 / US 70 / US 79 in Memphis; I-69 / I-240 in Memphis; US 51 in Memphis; I-240 in Memphis
- East end: US 78 at the Mississippi state line near Capleville

Location
- Country: United States
- State: Tennessee
- County: Shelby

Highway system
- United States Numbered Highway System; List; Special; Divided; Tennessee State Routes; Interstate; US; State
← SR 77	→ SR 78
← SR 3	SR 4	→ SR 5
← SR 277	SR 278	→ SR 279

U.S. Highway 78 (US 78) is a 15.90-mile-long (25.59 km) east–west U.S. Highway in Tennessee where the route travels entirely within the city of Memphis in Shelby County.

== Route description ==
US 78 enters Tennessee along Interstate 55 (I-55) from Arkansas on the Memphis & Arkansas Bridge across the Mississippi River. Upon crossing the river, US 78 immediately diverges from I-55 onto E.H. Crump Boulevard at a complex interchange. It is concurrent with US 61, US 64, US 70, US 79, and Tennessee State Route 1 (SR 1) until Third Street/B.B. King Boulevard. US 61 turns south onto SR 14 south (Third Street) while US 64, US 70, and US 79 turns north onto SR 4 west and SR 14 north (B.B. King Boulevard) at this intersection. This is also where SR 4 becomes concurrent with US 78 for the remainder of its length. About a 1/4 mile (0.40 km) later, SR 1 turns north onto (Danny Thomas Boulevard). US 78 and SR 4 then continues along E.H. Crump Boulevard to meet two interchanges with I-240. Around I-240, the road changes names to Lamar Avenue and then it meets US 51 and SR 3 before continuing southeastwardly to the Mississippi state line.

In Memphis, US 78 is historically known as Pigeon Roost Road, and some aborted sections of the highway in Mississippi also claim that name as well as Lamar Avenue.

== History ==
Map showing the former west end of US 78 in downtown Memphis before the extension to Northeast Arkansas in November 2023

On October 25, 2023, the Arkansas Highway Commission voted unanimously to extend the US 78 designation into northeast Arkansas. According to the Arkansas Department of Transportation (ARDOT), the US 78 designation would be extended along several other routes from its current western terminus in Memphis, Tennessee, across the Memphis & Arkansas Bridge to a new western terminus near Swifton, Arkansas, at US 67 (before I-57 was designated at that time). The route would be cosigned along portions of US 64, US 70, US 79, I-55, US 61, I-40, Arkansas Highway 18 (AR 18), AR 18S, I-555, US 49, US 63, and AR 226. This extension of the US 78 route designation was seen as a way to boost economic growth in the region by assigning a single route number for travelers to follow. The extension was approved by AASHTO in November 2023.

=== Interstate 22 ===
Interstate 22 (I-22) was planned to continue westward along the US 78 corridor beyond I-269 and Mississippi Highway 304 (MS 304) in Byhalia, Mississippi, where it currently ends west to this day to an interchange with I-55 near the Arkansas state line or to an interchange with I-69 and I-240 near the downtown in Memphis. US 78 is already up to Interstate Highway standards in the Mississippi portion. However, about a 1/2 mile (0.80 km) after crossing the Tennessee state line, the freeway portion of US 78 ends and becomes an unlimited access road. Because the Tennessee portion of US 78 does not meet Interstate standards, combined with the heavy development along Lamar Avenue, plans of I-22 going directly to Memphis were cancelled. This means the I-22 designation ends west at I-269 and MS 304 in Byhalia. To this day, Tennessee Department of Transportation (TDOT) is still upgrading some areas, but not all of, US 78 to a freeway.

== Future ==
US 78 and SR 4 in Memphis, Tennessee, is currently being upgraded between the Mississippi state line and SR 176, a distance of about 5.1 miles (8.2 km). The route, Lamar Avenue, sees heavy freight traffic and has "crippling congestion". The work includes expanding the road from four to six lanes, adding three new interchanges, and upgrading additional ones. The work is being done in three segments with the first one starting in 2018.

== Major intersections ==
The entire route is in Memphis, Shelby County.

mi	km	Exit	Destinations	Notes
0.00	0.00		I-55 north / US 61 north / US 64 west / US 70 west / US 78 west / US 79 south – West Memphis, Blytheville, St. Louis	Continuation into Arkansas at the Memphis & Arkansas Bridge crossing the Mississippi River; western terminus of SR 1; western end of SR 1 concurrency
0.48	0.77	12C	Metal Museum Drive	Served the National Ornamental Metal Museum; removed during 2022-2025 reconstruction; northern terminus of Metal Museum Drive
0.52	0.84	12	I-55 south – Jackson Miss / Riverside Drive north / Alston Avenue west	Eastern end of I-55 concurrency; southern terminus of Riverside Drive; eastern terminus of Alston Avenue, which links to Metal Museum Drive; was reconfigured into roundabout interchange, which was completed in 2025; former cloverleaf interchange; former I-55 exits 12A-B
1.21	1.95		US 61 south (South 3rd Street / SR 14 south) – Vicksburg, Brownsville US 64 east / US 70 east / US 79 north (South B. B. King Boulevard / SR 4 west / SR 14 north) – Downtown Memphis	Eastern end of US 61/US 64/US 70/US 79 concurrency; western end of unsigned SR 4 concurrency
1.66	2.67		SR 1 east (South Danny Thomas Boulevard north) / South Wellington Street south	Eastern end of SR 1 concurrency; southern terminus of South Danny Thomas Boulevard; northern terminus of South Wellington Street
3.07	4.94		Dr. Martin Luther King Jr. Avenue west	Eastern terminus of SR 278; former US 78 west; right-in/right-out intersection; westbound exit and entrance
3.23	5.20		I-240 (I-69 / Dr. Martin Luther King Jr. Expressway) – Jackson Miss, Little Rock	Exit 29 on I-240
3.43	5.52		US 51 (South Bellevue Boulevard / SR 3)	
8.45	13.60		I-240 (Avron B. Fogelman Expressway) – St. Louis, Nashville	Exit 21 on I-240
10.53	16.95		SR 176 (Getwell Road)	Interchange on SR 176
12.13	19.52	–	East Raines Road	Interchange
13.77	22.16		SR 175 (East Shelby Road)	
14.99	24.12	–	East Holmes Road	Interchange
15.37	24.74		Old Hwy 78 east to MS 178 east / Davidson Road south	Old Hwy 78 is the former US 78 east, which is now MS 178 east beginning at the Mississippi border; western terminus of Old Hwy 78; northern terminus of Davidson Road
15.90	25.59		US 78 east to I-22 east – Tupelo, Birmingham	Continuation into Mississippi; eastern terminus of SR 4; eastern end of unsigned SR 4 concurrency
1.000 mi = 1.609 km; 1.000 km = 0.621 mi: Closed/former; Concurrency terminus; Incomplete access

== Related routes ==
=== State Route 4 ===
State Route 4
- Location: Memphis
- Length: 18.58 mi (29.90 km)
- Existed: October 1, 1923–present

State Route 4 (SR 4) is a 18.58-mile-long (29.90 km) primary unsigned state route highway which is mostly as concurrent with US 78 throughout the state. However for 3.20 miles (5.15 km), before its concurrency with US 78, the route begins as an independent route at an intersection of US 51 and SR 3 (Thomas Street), where the roadway continues west as Chelsea Avenue. SR 4 goes along with Chelsea Avenue until it meets an intersection with one pair way North 2nd Street and North 3rd Street. North 2nd Street severs the eastbound lanes of SR 4 where the route turns left at from Chelsea Avenue while North 3rd Street severs the westbound lanes. About a 1/2 mile (0.80 km) later at an intersection with A.W. Willis Avenue, SR 4 meets SR 14, which joins the concurrency with SR 4. Both routes continue along the one way pairs of both North 2nd and 3rd streets toward downtown Memphis. Before entering downtown, both routes meets an partial interchange with I-40 at exit 1A, which only serves as a westbound exit and a eastbound entrance from I-40 to SR 4 and SR 14. Winchester Street used to be a connector from the eastbound lanes of SR 4 and SR 14 to access I-40 eastbound, but it has been closed and blocked ever since causing drivers to use the next street which is Market Avenue from the eastbound lanes as a u-turn to the westbound lanes and then a block later to make a right turn to get on I-40 eastbound. Also at this interchange, the off ramp from I-40 only enters on the eastbound lanes of SR 4 and SR 14, which requires the same u-turn method to access the westbound lanes of SR 4 and SR 14 from the eastbound lanes. Both routes then continue to downtown Memphis. After entering downtown at an intersection of Union Avenue, both routes meet US 64, US 70, and US 79 which also joins the concurrency with SR 4 and SR 14. Five of those routes continues southward to G.E. Patterson Avenue where both one pair streets becomes back to a two-way street. This is also where both North 2nd and 3rd streets name ends and the roadway becomes South B.B. King Boulevard. Five of those routes keep continuing south to an intersection of E.H.H. Crump Boulevard which carries US 61 north, US 78, and SR 1. At that intersection, US 64, US 70, and US 79 turns right onto the boulevard, SR 14 continuing straight with US 61 south where the roadway continues as South 3rd Street, and SR 4 turning left onto the boulevard. From this point on, SR 4 continues its remainder of the length along with US 78 southeastward to the Mississippi state line.

Major intersections

The entire route is in Memphis, Shelby County.

mi	km	Destinations	Notes
0.00	0.00	US 51 (Thomas Street / SR 3) / Chelsea Avenue north	Western terminus; Chelsea Avenue continues past terminus
0.89	1.43	SR 14 north (A.W. Willis Avenue)	Western end of SR 14 concurrency
1.17	1.88	I-40 east – Nashville	I-40’s westbound exit and eastbound entrance; exit 1A on I-40
1.91	3.07	US 64 east / US 70 east / US 79 north (Union Avenue)	Western end of US 64/US 70/US 79 concurrency
2.26	3.64	Doctor M.L.K. Jr Avenue	Western terminus of SR 278; former western terminus of US 78
3.20	5.15	US 61 south (South 3rd Street / SR 14 south) – Vicksburg, Brownsville US 61 north / US 64 west / US 70 west / US 78 west / US 79 south (E.H.H. Crump Boulevard west / SR 1 west) to I-55 – St. Louis	Western end of US 78/SR 1 concurrency; eastern end of US 64/US 70/US 79/SR 14 concurrency; from here, SR 4 continues along with US 78 southeastward to the Mississippi state line for the remainder of its length
1.000 mi = 1.609 km; 1.000 km = 0.621 mi: Concurrency terminus; Incomplete access

=== State Route 278 ===
State Route 278
- Dr. Martin Luther King Jr. Avenue
- Location: Memphis
- Length: 1.82 mi (2.93 km)
- Existed: July 1, 1983–present

Before the extension of US 78 into Arkansas, the route ran along MLK Avenue (formerly Linden Street) and Somerville Street until E. H. Crump Boulevard, turning onto Lamar Avenue. This former portion of US 78 was overlapped in its entirety by State Route 278 (SR 278), which is unsigned in its entire length for 1.82 miles (2.93 km). SR 278 begins at US 64/US 70/US 79/SR 4/SR 14 (Second Street) in Memphis, which is where US 78 formerly began before November 2023. About a 1/4 mile (0.40 km) later, it meets SR 1 (Danny Thomas Boulevard). About 1 mile (1.6 km) later after an intersection with South Pauline Street, SR 278 along with. Dr. Martin Luther King Jr. Avenue turns south in a sharp 90 degree angle. About 500 feet (0.15 km) after the sharp turn, it meets a right-in/right-out intersection with SR 4 (E. H. Crump Boulevard) where the former US 78 turns right and then makes a immediate u-turn at the next intersection of South Camilla Street to continue with SR 4 eastbound southeastward to the Mississippi state line.

Major intersections

The entire route is in Memphis, Shelby County.

mi	km	Destinations	Notes
0.00	0.00	US 64 / US 70 / US 79 (Second Street / SR 4 / SR 14)	Western terminus of SR 278; former western terminus of US 78; former western end of US 78 concurrency
0.49	0.79	SR 1 (Danny Thomas Boulevard)	
1.82	2.93	E. H. Crump Boulevard (US 78 / SR 4)	Eastern terminus of SR 278; former eastern end of US 78 concurrency; right-in/right-out intersection; no left turn allowed from SR 278 east to US 78/SR 4 east or from US 78/SR 4 east to SR 278 west
1.000 mi = 1.609 km; 1.000 km = 0.621 mi: Incomplete access

== See also ==
U.S. Route 78
Previous state: Arkansas	Tennessee	Next state: Mississippi
