= TN4 =

TN4 or TN-4 may refer to:

- Tennessee's 4th congressional district
- Tennessee State Route 4
- TN4, a postcode district in Tunbridge Wells, England; see TN postcode area
