= Capleville, Memphis =

Community in Memphis, Tennessee, US

Coordinates: 35°01′14″N 89°53′52″W

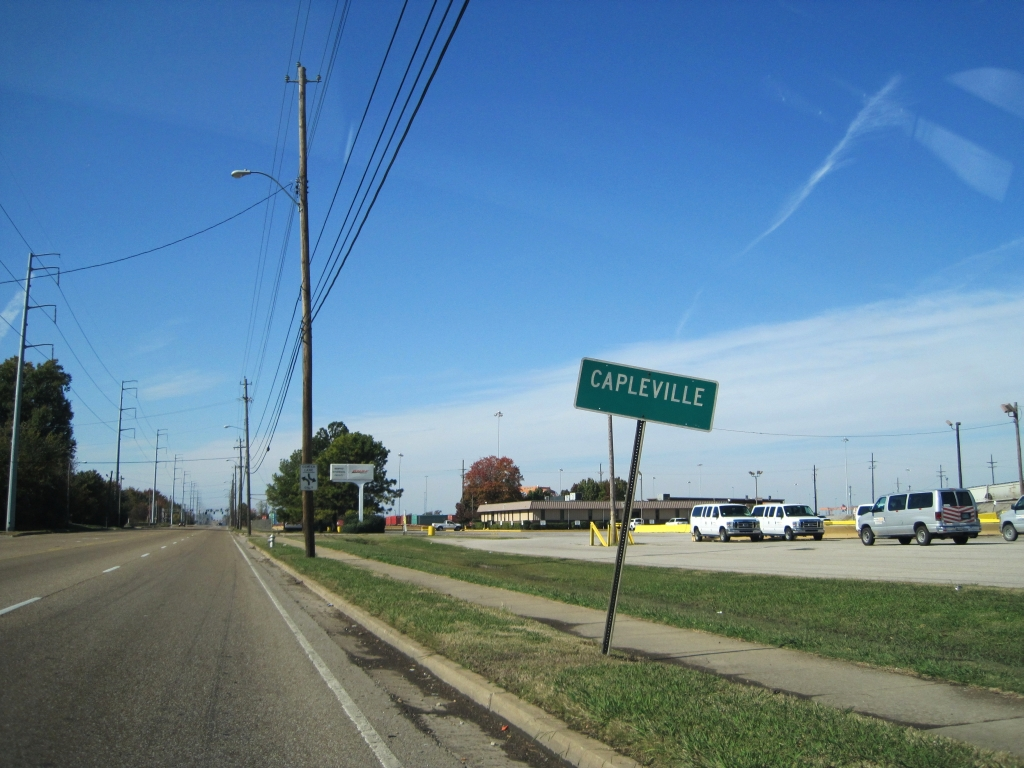
Road sign for Capleville

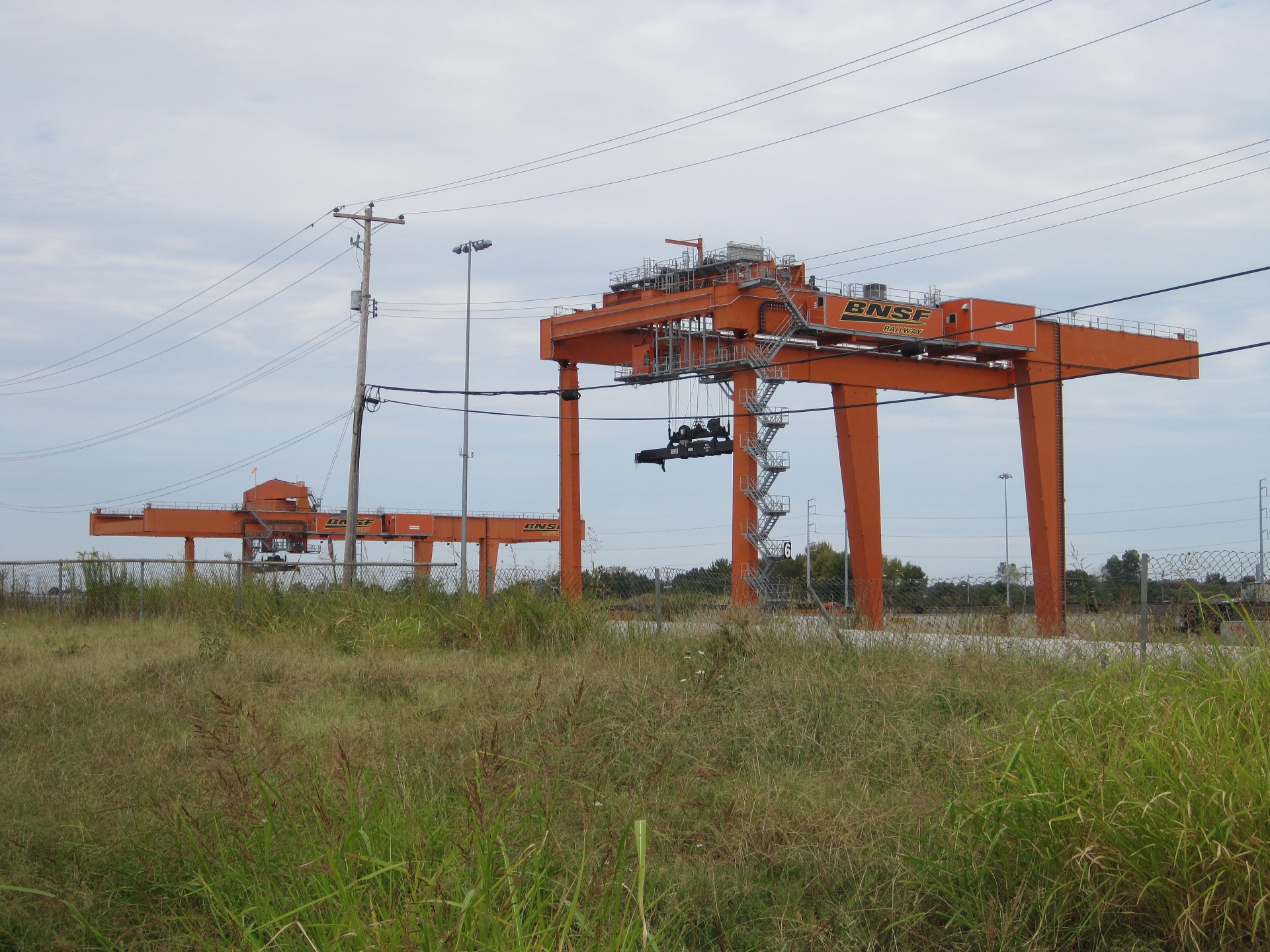
A BNSF Railway crane at the intermodal facility in Capleville

Capleville is a community in the southeast section of Memphis, Tennessee, United States, and is north of the Mississippi border. It is located 0.5 mi. east of the Memphis International Airport, starting 1 mi. west of the intersection of State Routes 176 and 175, and heading east along State Route 175 (Shelby Drive) crossing U.S. Route 78. The area has been incorporated into the City of Memphis and since has become a large industrial center due to its proximity to the airport and Lamar Avenue (U.S. Route 78) which becomes a divided freeway after State Route 175.

Local landmarks include Emerald Park, Fox Meadows Park, McFarland Park, Mooney Park, Walter K Singleton Park and Wilson Park. Although its current buildings were not erected until after 1971, the Capleville Methodist Church is listed on the National Register of Historic Places.

Capleville is the childhood home of author Jerry Pournelle.

The Caples were some of the first settlers in West Tennessee, and once owned all the land in Tennessee that became Capleville, plus some land in Mississippi. Sudie Caple married into the Sims Family, another prominent Family in Memphis, Tennessee. Her son Thomas M. "Pappy" Sims joined the U.S. Army in 1941, at the age of 31, thus earning him the appellation of "Pappy" as he was the oldest recruit in his unit. He distinguished himself in World War II. He was in Patton's Third Army, and it was his company that discovered Hitler's secret jet airplane factory hidden below a mountain. He was grievously wounded in battle in heroic action and was awarded the Bronze Star and Purple Heart.
