= U.S. Route 78 =

Highway in the United States

U.S. Route 78
- US 78 highlighted in red

Route information
- Length: 843.6 mi (1,357.6 km)
- Existed: 1926–present

Major junctions
- West end: I-57 / US 67 / AR 226 near Swifton, AR
- I-555 at Jonesboro, AR; I-55 at Blytheville, AR; I-40 at West Memphis, AR; I-55 / I-69 / I-240 at Memphis, TN; I-22 from Byhalia, MS to Graysville, AL; I-20 at various locations; I-59 / I-65 at Birmingham, AL; I-75 / I-85 at Atlanta, GA; I-95 at St. George, SC; I-26 at North Charleston, SC
- East end: Line Street at Charleston, SC

Location
- Country: United States
- States: Arkansas, Tennessee, Mississippi, Alabama, Georgia, South Carolina

Highway system
- United States Numbered Highway System; List; Special; Divided
← US 77	US	→ US 79

U.S. Route 78 (US 78) is an east–west United States Numbered Highway that runs for 843.6 miles (1,357.6 km) from Swifton, Arkansas, to Charleston, South Carolina. From Byhalia, Mississippi, to Graysville, Alabama, US 78 runs concurrently with Interstate 22 (I-22). The highway’s western terminus is at I-57/US 67 near Swifton, and its eastern terminus is on Line Street, in Charleston. Prior to November 2023, before the western extension, the highway's former western terminus was at US 64/US 70/US 79 (Second Street) in Memphis, Tennessee.

== Route description ==
Lengths
	mi	km
AR	140.8	226.6
TN	15.9	25.6
MS	117.4	188.9
AL	194.0	312.2
GA	233.3	375.5
SC	142.2	228.8
Total	843.6	1,357.6

=== Arkansas ===
US 78 begins at interchange with I-57/US 67 at exit 102 where the roadway continues as AR 226 west toward Swifton. The route goes through towns of Cash, Jonesboro, Lake City, Black Oak, Monette, Manila and Blytheville. In Blytheville, the route runs concurrently with Interstate 55 (I-55) and travels south, going through Marion and West Memphis before turning east and crossing on the Memphis & Arkansas Bridge over the Mississippi River to enter Memphis, Tennessee.

=== Tennessee ===
Map showing the former west end of US 78 in downtown Memphis before the extension to Northeast Arkansas in November 2023

US 78 enters Tennessee along I-55 from Arkansas and shortly after diverges from I-55 onto E.H. Crump Boulevard. It is concurrent with US 61, US 64, US 70, US 79 and State Route 1 (SR 1) until Third Street/B.B. King Boulevard. US 61 turns south onto SR 14 south (Third Street) while US 64, US 70, and US 79 turn north onto SR 4 west and SR 14 north (B.B. King Boulevard) at this intersection. This is also where SR 4 becomes concurrent with US 78 for the remainder of its length. About a 1/4 mile (0.40 km) later, SR 1 turns north onto (Danny Thomas Boulevard). US 78/SR 4 then continues along E.H. Crump Boulevard to meet two interchanges with I-240 (the first interchange of I-240 is concurrent with I-69). Around I-240, the road changes names to Lamar Avenue and then it meets US 51 and SR 3 before continuing southeastwardly to the Mississippi state line.

In Memphis, US 78 is historically known as Pigeon Roost Road, and some aborted sections of the highway in Mississippi also claim that name as well as Lamar Avenue.

=== Mississippi ===
US 78 is a freeway for its entire length in Mississippi. The section from its intersection with I-269 in Byhalia, Mississippi to the Alabama state line is concurrent with I-22. The highway runs across the northeastern rural part of the state, connecting several population centers. Mississippi's portion of US 78 is defined in Mississippi Code Annotated § 65-3-3. The old routing of US 78 through the state is signed as MS 178.

=== Alabama ===
US 78 is a major east–west U.S. highway across the central part of Alabama. It is internally designated SR 4 by the Alabama Department of Transportation, though the only section of SR 4 that is signed is along portions mainly west of Jasper. The section from the Mississippi state line to near Graysville is concurrent with I-22; from Graysville south to Birmingham, US 78 takes its original routing. East of Birmingham to the Georgia state line, US 78 has been replaced as a major through-route by I-20. The two routes roughly parallel each other, with junctions at Leeds and Pell City.

West of Jasper, old US 78 is signed as SR 118 to Guin, and the segment from Guin northward to I-22 at Hamilton is signed as US 43/US 278.

=== Georgia ===
US 78 enters Georgia in Haralson County, passing through the downtowns of Tallapoosa and Bremen. It then proceeds through Carroll County and Douglas County. In Douglasville, located in Douglas County, US 78 runs through the downtown, historical part of the city. It is the original thoroughfare for these Georgia counties. Here, it is known colliqually as The Atlanta Highway.

The route then continues eastward through Cobb and Fulton counties into Atlanta. After crossing Peachtree Street, where US 78 marks a boundary between Downtown and Midtown, US 78 is largely conterminous with Ponce de Leon Avenue. As it proceeds due east, this section of the route passes Ponce City Market and crosses the Eastside Trail of the BeltLine before skirting a number of Frederick Law Olmsted-designed parks in the Druid Hills Historic District at the eastern edge of the city.

After entering Decatur in DeKalb County, US 78 departs from Ponce de Leon Avenue to head northeast. South of the site of North DeKalb Mall, another short freeway portion begins — leading from just inside the eastern rim of Interstate 285 (the Perimeter) to the suburbs of Clarkston, Tucker, Stone Mountain, and Snellville. This portion is named the Stone Mountain Freeway, and provides an excellent view of Stone Mountain for eastbound motorists.

The route then proceeds east across Gwinnett, Walton, and Oconee counties. In Oconee County, US 78 leaves Moina Michael Highway at the SR 316 interchange, turning right and running concurrently with SR 316/US 29. (From this point, Moina Michael Highway is signed as US 78 Business, which follows the original route of US 78 through Athens) At the terminal eastern interchange of SR 316 both US 78 and US 29 turn right and join with SR 10 Loop, a mostly Interstate-grade bypass that rings Athens-Clarke County. US 78 exits the bypass and turns right at the Lexington Road interchange. From there US 78 passes through Oglethorpe, Wilkes, McDuffie and Columbia Counties into Augusta and then onto one of the twin bridges across the Savannah River into South Carolina.

=== South Carolina ===
US 78 provides the most direct route between Augusta and Charleston, through the South Carolina Lowcountry. Crossing Savannah River into the state, it goes northeast into Aiken before going southeasterly through the cities and towns of Williston, Blackville, Denmark, Bamberg, Branchville, and St. George. East of Dorchester, it parallels I-26 into downtown Charleston, where it ends.

== History ==
In western Alabama, the historical name of US 78 is Bankhead Highway. It is also known by this name in portions of Georgia, including Atlanta, and the Bankhead neighborhood takes its name from that stretch of road. Also, the old section of US 78 (now MS 178) that travels through downtown New Albany, Mississippi, is named Bankhead Street.

Throughout the 2000s, US 78 has been gradually upgraded into a four-lane freeway in Mississippi and Alabama and signed as I-22. US 78 is concurrent with I-22 from Byhalia, Mississippi to just outside of Birmingham, Alabama, only branching off just outside of Graysville, Alabama with I-22 traveling about 11 miles (18 km) eastward to its terminus at I-65.

On October 25, 2023, the Arkansas Highway Commission voted unanimously to extend the US 78 designation into northeast Arkansas. According to the Arkansas Department of Transportation (ARDOT), the US 78 designation would be extended along several other routes from its current western terminus in Memphis, Tennessee across the Memphis & Arkansas Bridge to a new western terminus near Swifton, Arkansas at US 67 (before I-57 was designated at that time). The route would be cosigned along portions of US 64, US 70, US 79, I-55, US 61, I-40, Arkansas Highway 18 (AR 18), AR 18S, I-555, US 49, US 63, and AR 226. This extension of the US 78 route designation was seen as a way to boost economic growth in the region by assigning a single route number for travelers to follow. The extension was approved by AASHTO in November 2023.

== Future ==
US 78 and SR 4 in Memphis, Tennessee is currently being upgraded between the Mississippi state line and SR 176, a distance of about 5.1 miles (8.2 km). The route, Lamar Avenue, sees heavy freight traffic and has "crippling congestion." The work includes expanding the road from four to six lanes, adding three new interchanges, and upgrading additional ones. The work is being done in three segments with the first one starting in 2018.

== Major intersections ==
Arkansas
I-57 / US 67 near Swifton
US 49 / US 63 west of Jonesboro. The highways travel concurrently toward and through Jonesboro.
I-555 in Jonesboro. The highway travels through Jonesboro.
US 61 in Blytheville
I-55 in Blytheville. Begin I-55 concurrency.
US 61 in Blytheville
I-555 / US 61 northwest of Turrell. Begin US 61 concurrency.
US 64 in Marion. Begin US 64 concurrency.
I-40 / US 79 in West Memphis. I-40/US 78 travels through West Memphis. Begin US 79 concurrency.
US 70 in West Memphis. Begin US 70 concurrency.
Tennessee
I-55 in Memphis. End I-55 concurrency.
US 61 / US 64 / US 70 / US 79 in Memphis. End US 61/US 64/US 70/US 79 concurrency.
I-69 / I-240 in Memphis
US 51 in Memphis
I-240 in Memphis
Mississippi
I-22 / I-269 west-northwest of Byhalia. Begin I-22 concurrency.
US 45 in Tupelo
Alabama
US 43 / US 278 in Hamilton
I-22 near Adamsville. End I-22 concurrency.
I-20 / I-59 in Birmingham
US 11 in Birmingham. The highways travel concurrently through Birmingham.
I-65 in Birmingham
US 31 / US 280 in Birmingham
I-20 in Leeds
US 411 in Leeds
I-20 northwest of Chulavista. The highways travel concurrently to Pell City.
US 231 in Pell City
I-20 in Riverside
US 431 in Oxford.
Georgia
US 27 in Bremen
US 278 in Lithia Springs. The highways travel concurrently to Druid Hills.
I-285 in Atlanta
US 19 / US 41 in Atlanta. The highways travel concurrently through Atlanta.
US 19 / US 29 / US 41 in Atlanta. US 29/US 78 travels concurrently to the Scottdale–North Decatur city line.
US 23 in Atlanta. The highways travel concurrently to Decatur.
I-285 on the Scottdale–Clarkston city line
US 29 southeast of Bogart. The highways travel concurrently to Athens.
US 129 / US 441 in Athens. The highways travel concurrently through Athens.
US 378 in Washington
US 278 southeast of Thomson. The highways travel concurrently to Clearwater, South Carolina.
US 221 in Harlem
I-520 in Augusta
US 1 in Augusta. The highways travel concurrently to Aiken, South Carolina.
US 25 in Augusta. The highways travel concurrently to North Augusta, South Carolina.
South Carolina
I-520 in North Augusta
US 321 in Denmark
US 301 / US 601 in Bamberg
US 21 in Branchville. The highways travel concurrently through Branchville.
I-95 in St. George
US 15 in St. George
US 178 east of Dorchester
I-26 in North Charleston
US 52 in North Charleston. The highways travel concurrently through North Charleston.
I-26 in North Charleston
I-526 in North Charleston
I-26 / US 17 in Charleston
King Street/Line Street in Charleston

== See also ==
- Special routes of U.S. Route 78

=== Related U.S. Routes ===
- U.S. Route 178
- U.S. Route 278
- U.S. Route 378
