= Tennessee State Route 175 =

State highway in Tennessee, United States

State Route 175
- Shelby Drive; Byhalia Road
- SR 175 highlighted in red

Route information
- Maintained by TDOT
- Length: 26.3 mi (42.3 km)
- Existed: July 1, 1983–present

Major junctions
- West end: MS 301 at Mississippi state line in Memphis
- US 61 in Memphis; US 51 in Memphis; I-55 in Memphis; US 78 in Memphis; SR 385 near Collierville
- East end: US 72 / SR 57 in Collierville

Location
- Country: United States
- State: Tennessee
- Counties: Shelby

Highway system
- Tennessee State Routes; Interstate; US; State
← SR 174	→ SR 176

State Route 175 (SR 175) is a Tennessee designated state route, running for a total of approximately 26.3 miles (42.3 km) through southern Shelby County, Tennessee.

== Route description ==
=== Memphis ===
SR 175 begins in extreme southwestern Shelby County as a continuation of MS 301 along Weaver Road. It intersects US 61/SR 14 (Third Street) and travels with it until Shelby Drive where it turns east. After about one mile (1.6 km), SR 175 passes Greeter Park and intercepts Horn Lake Road to become East Shelby Drive, passing through the community of Persey. SR 175 then crosses the Illinois Central Railroad. From this point, SR 175 travels another 2.4 miles (3.9 km) through Whitehaven in southern Memphis, and intercepts US 51 (SR 3/Elvis Presley Boulevard). Then, SR 175 continues for 1.3 miles (2.1 km), and intercepts I-55 (Exit 2). Shortly after, intercepting Airways Boulevard and passing the Memphis International Airport. After passing the airport SR 175 has an intersection with SR 176 (Getwell Road) before it intercepts US 78 (SR 4/Lamar Avenue) within the community of Capleville and crosses the BNSF Railway twice.

=== Germantown ===
After 3.5 miles (5.6 km), and crossing several major city roads, SR 175 (East Shelby Drive) crosses South Germantown Road and enters Germantown. It then intercepts Hacks Cross Road after 1.5 miles (2.4 km).

=== Collierville ===
Following another two miles (3.2 km), SR 175 (East Shelby Drive) shares a crossroads with Forest Hill Irene Road, entering Collierville, and becoming a two-lane road. For the next two miles (3.2 km) SR 175 is somewhat rural, then crossing South Houston Levee Road. SR 175 then briefly widens to six lanes for 0.6 miles (0.97 km) before crossing Fleming Road, and then goes another 1/2 mile (0.80 km) along a narrow rural route before stopping at Byhalia Road. SR 175 turns left onto Byhalia Road and heads nearly due north. SR 175 continues for one mile (1.6 km) until widening to four lanes and crossing SR 385. SR 175 then travels one mile (1.6 km) before the designation ends at Poplar Avenue (US 72/SR 57) in the heart of the Collierville business district. Although SR 175 stops here, Byhalia Road continues.

== History ==
The original SR 175 was on a different route before 2004, when the last 2 miles (3.2 km) of East Shelby Drive were included into the route. The original road took a sharp left onto what is now Houston Levee Road for 0.4 miles (0.64 km), then a sharp right onto what is now Collierville Road, and continued east for 2.4 miles (3.9 km), until reaching Byhalia Road, and taking a sharp left, continuing to the end of the current route. These last 2.4 miles (3.9 km) of SR 175 (Collierville Road) have undergone rigorous construction since about 1998, and barely one-third of the current road follows exactly the original route.

Prior to the 1980s, Shelby Drive was known as "Whitehaven-Capleville Road" or "Whitecap" for short; also, the portion of the current route between Fleming Road and Byhalia Road in Collierville was called "Mann Road."

== Major intersections ==
The entire route is in Shelby County.

Location	mi	km	Destinations	Notes
Memphis	0.0	0.0	MS 301 south (Weaver Road) – Lynchburg	Mississippi state line; western terminus
Memphis	1.2	1.9	US 61 south (S 3rd Street/SR 14 south) – Tunica Resorts, MS	Western end of US 61/SR 14 overlap
Memphis	2.0	3.2	US 61 north (S 3rd Street/SR 14 north) – Downtown	Eastern end of US 61/SR 14 overlap
Memphis	5.5	8.9	US 51 (Elvis Presley Boulevard/SR 3) – Southaven, MS, Downtown	
Memphis	6.6– 7.0	10.6– 11.3	I-55 (I-69) – Jackson Miss, St. Louis	I-55 exit 2 northbound, exit 2 A/B southbound; I-69 is unsigned
Memphis	7.5	12.1	Airways Boulevard - Memphis International Airport	
Memphis	10.5	16.9	SR 176 (Getwell Road)	
Memphis	12.7	20.4	US 78 (Lamar Avenue/SR 4) – Tupelo Miss, Downtown	
Collierville	25.4– 25.5	40.9– 41.0	SR 385 (Bill Morris Parkway) – Memphis, Arlington	Interchange
Collierville	26.3	42.3	US 72 / SR 57 (W Poplar Avenue) – Germantown, Downtown, Piperton	Eastern terminus
1.000 mi = 1.609 km; 1.000 km = 0.621 mi: Concurrency terminus
