= Atlanta Highway =

The Atlanta Highway refers to three distinct state routes:

- United States Route 78 in Athens, Georgia
- United States Route 23 between Buford and Gainesville, Georgia
- Georgia State Route 13 between Buford and Gainesville, Georgia
