= President's Island =

River peninsula in Memphis, Tennessee, United States

Coordinates: 35.1043°N 90.1319°W

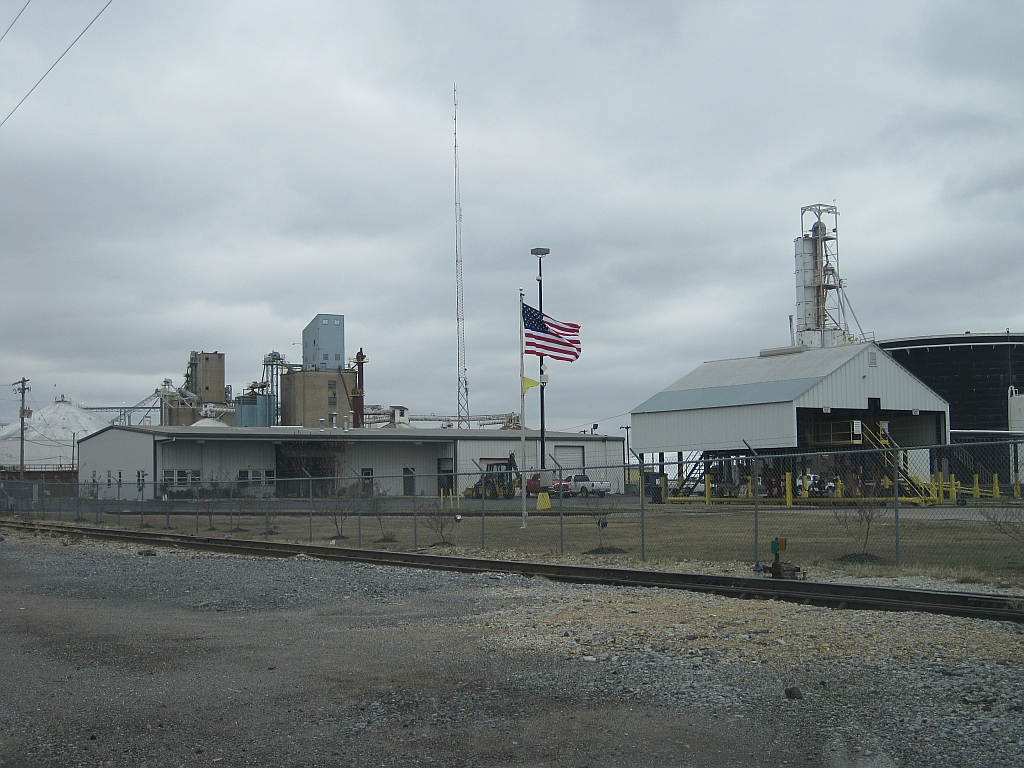
Presidents Island

President's Island is a peninsula on the Mississippi River in southwest Memphis, Tennessee. The city's major river port and an industrial park are located there.

== History ==
The name President or President's Island appeared as early as 1801 or 1802 in a river guide called Cramer's Navigator. The name referred to the island's size, then the largest on the Mississippi River. At that time President's Island was an actual island. Some old river maps identify the northern third of the present island as Vice President's Island.

The Freedmen's Bureau established a camp on the island for freed slaves in 1865, and about 1,500 former slaves stayed there for a time. Some years later, Nathan Bedford Forrest contracted with local officials to establish a penal farm on the island to raise corn and cotton. Forrest offered to pay Shelby County 10 cents a day for each worker. Forrest died in 1877, possibly of dysentery contracted by drinking impure island water. In the late 1870s the island served as a refuge for many people fleeing the yellow fever epidemics that swept the city, killing thousands.

The development plan devised in the 1940s called for closing the Tennessee Chute that had separated the island from the eastern bank. This created a deep-water harbor (later named McKellar Lake) accessible from the Mississippi by the channel at the south end of the island. The Flood Control Act of 1946 allocated $17 million for the project, and the U.S. Army Corps of Engineers began construction in 1948.

The flood control and industrial development project in the late 1940s dammed the section of river between the island and the eastern bank and created a peninsula. Prior to that time, the island was surrounded by the river and subject to its power. Floods interfered with various attempts to raise crops and endangered the lives of those who had settled there. The island's relative isolation and untamed landscape made it a favored location for illicit activities, including gambling, cockfights, and moonshining.

Four Memphians were most responsible for transforming President's Island into an industrial center: businessman Frank C. Pidgeon, E.H. Crump, U.S. Senator Kenneth McKellar, and Jack Carley, an editorial writer for the Commercial Appeal newspaper. McKellar was chairman of the Senate Appropriations Committee, which was instrumental in funding the project. Gen. M.C. Tyler, former president of the Mississippi River Commission, was also instrumental in plans for island development. The island was annexed by the city in 1947.

== Today ==
The 7,500 acre peninsula is home to a diverse wildlife habitat with 1,200 acres zoned for industrial development. 95% of the industrial land is already occupied with an annual economic impact of $7.1 billion. The industrial park supports about 200 companies with 4,000 employees. Most of the land is in the flood plain with several thousand acres of undeveloped woodlands.
