= Harahan Bridge =

Bridge between Arkansas and Tennessee, US

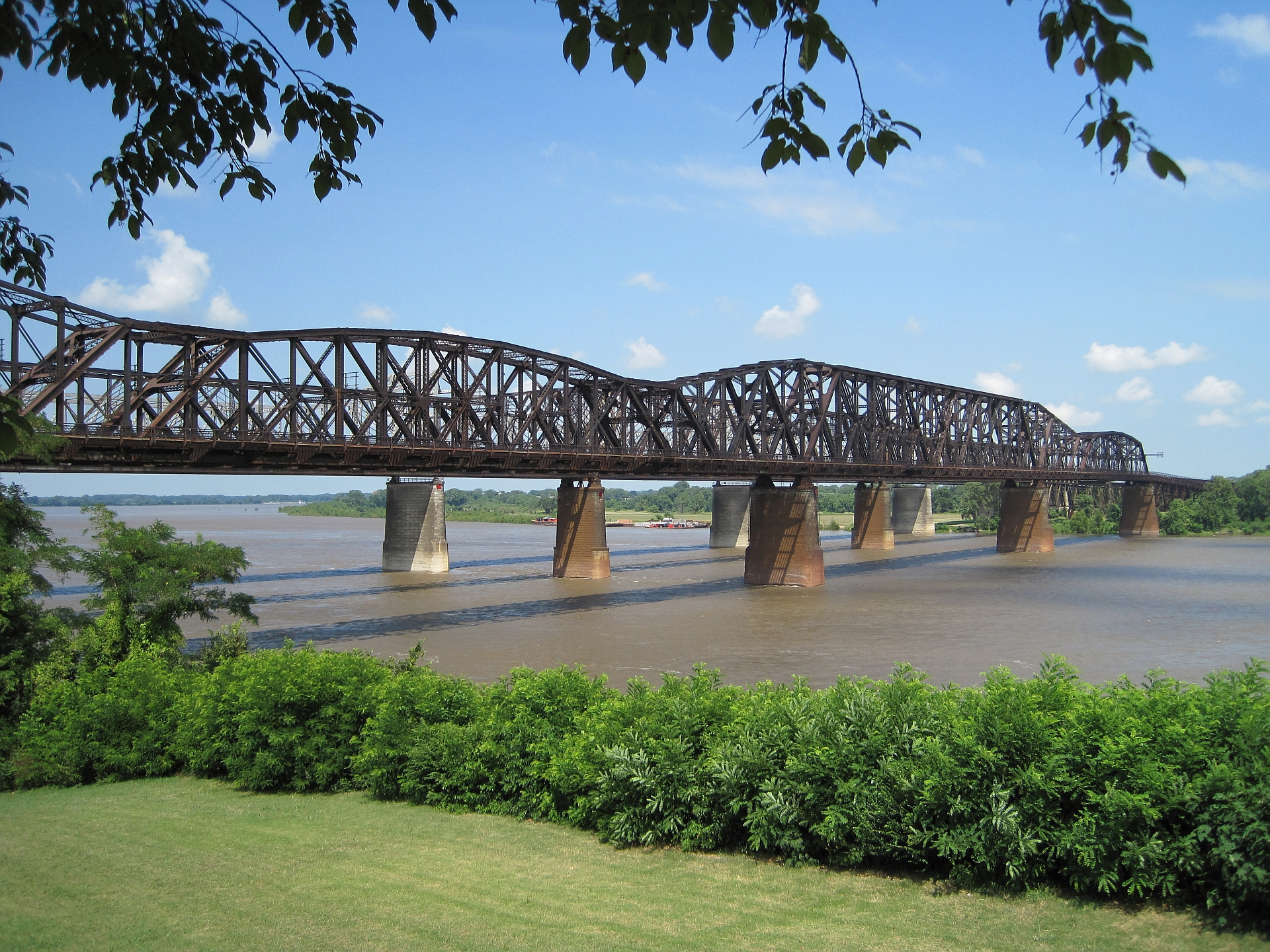
- Harahan Bridge from Martyrs Park
- Coordinates: 35°07′45″N 90°04′33″W
- Carries: Union Pacific Railroad and pedestrians
- Crosses: Mississippi River
- Locale: West Memphis, Arkansas and Memphis, Tennessee
- Maintained by: Union Pacific Railroad

Characteristics
- Design: Cantilevered through Truss bridge
- Total length: 4,973 feet (1,516 m)
- Longest span: 791 feet (241 m)
- Clearance below: 108 feet (33 m)

Rail characteristics
- No. of tracks: 2

History
- Opened: July 14, 1916

Statistics
- Daily traffic: 13.2 trains per day (as of 2014)

The Harahan Bridge is a cantilevered through truss bridge that carries two rail lines and a pedestrian bridge across the Mississippi River between West Memphis, Arkansas, and Memphis, Tennessee. The bridge is owned and operated by Union Pacific Railroad and is the second longest pedestrian/bicycle bridge in the United States (after the Walkway Over the Hudson in Poughkeepsie, New York). It was built with roadways cantilevered off the sides of the main structure for vehicles. These roadways are owned by the city of Memphis, Tennessee, and Crittenden County, Arkansas, and were used from 1917–1949, until the Memphis & Arkansas Bridge opened 400 feet (120 m) south of the Harahan. The bridge was named in honor of railroad executive James Theodore Harahan, former president of the Illinois Central Railroad, who was killed in a railroad accident during the construction of the bridge. In February 2011, Union Pacific Railroad officials agreed to the idea of converting the 1917 roadways into a bicycle-pedestrian walkway across the river. In June 2012, Memphis was awarded a $14.9 million federal grant to build the walkway. The overall project was expected to cost $30 million, of which about $11 million was used for the Harahan Bridge portion. Construction was completed in 2016.

== Description ==
The Harahan Bridge is in total 4,973 feet (1,516 m) long while the main bridge is 2,550 feet (780 m) from the east anchorage on the Memphis Bluffs to Pier 5 on the Arkansas flood plains. An additional 2,363 feet (720 m) tower and girder viaduct completes the bridge to the west abutment. The longest span is 791 feet (241 m) over the main channel on the Memphis side of the river. The bridge carries two rail lines and two roadways.

== History ==
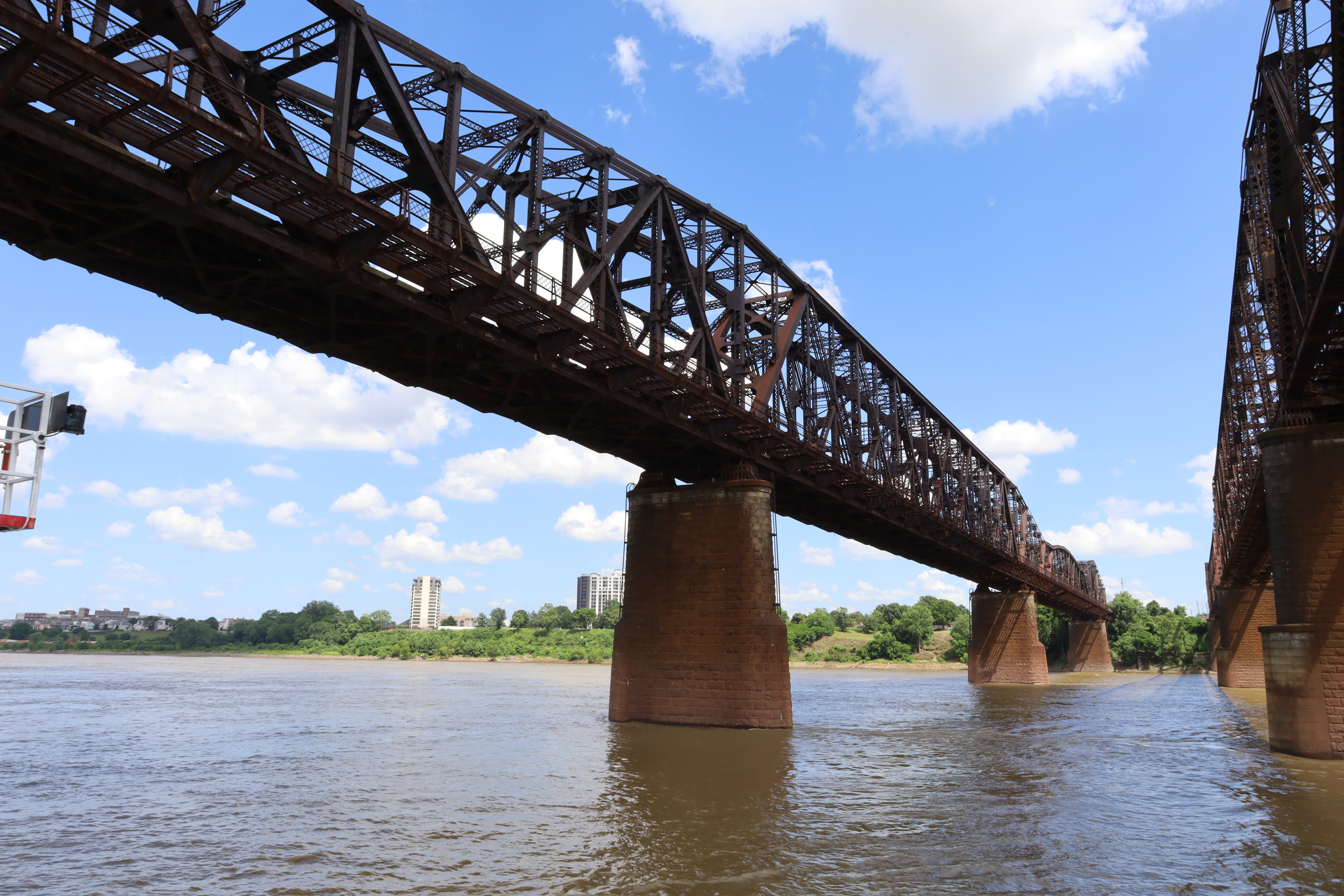
The bridge in 2022

The "Great Bridge," later known as the Frisco Bridge, opened in 1892 and was the first bridge to cross the Mississippi River south of the Ohio River. It was an engineering marvel, carrying a single track across the river. When finished, it was the third longest bridge in the world, but within 20 years of its opening, rail traffic had increased so much that another bridge was needed.

Mayor E.H. Crump met with officials from the Rock Island Railroad on February 5, 1912, to discuss the possibility of a new bridge. The Iron Mountain Railroad and the Cotton Belt Railroad joined and formed the Memphis and Arkansas Bridge and Terminal Company. The plan drew wide support from the Memphis business community, and political leaders were urged to present a bill to Congress for approval of the ambitious project. This plan estimated the cost at $2.6 million and would include $400,000 for wagonways along each side.

Initially, developers of the Rock Island Railroad were not interested in providing vehicular access to their bridge. Newly elected Congressman Kenneth McKellar from Memphis threatened to block the bridge permit if wagonways were not included. This bill also met with opposition in the form of Democratic party leader Oscar Underwood of Alabama. Congressman Underwood's campaign manager, Edward Campbell, was attorney for the Kansas City, Memphis and Birmingham Railroad, which was the owner of the "Great Bridge." The KCM&B Railroad did not want a competing bridge to undermine its monopoly on the Mississippi river crossing. Congressman McKellar led a bipartisan majority to approve the bill.

Leaders in Arkansas resented Memphis dealing with the railroad without their involvement. This was the first attempt in a long running feud over the bridge. Arkansas wanted a "toll-free" bridge that would accommodate trolley lines. In August 1912, a mass meeting was held in Marion, Arkansas. There, the Rock Island Railroad agreed to build a $4 million bridge with wagonways that would be turned over to Crittenden County and the City of Memphis, to be used "without toll for all time."

On April 10, 1913, Ralph Modjeski was instructed to prepare plans for the bridge in Memphis. A "force" of draftsmen was employed to detail drawings for the substructure and superstructure of the bridge. On May 13, 1913, plans were submitted by the railroad to the U.S. Engineer for approval by the war department.

Of the Harahan's total length of 4,972 feet (1,515 m), 1,194 feet (364 m) lie in Tennessee, and 3,778 feet (1,152 m) lie in Arkansas. This was based on the state line being set in the center of the Mississippi river at low water. This disparity on ownership and maintenance was further exacerbated by the addition of 2.5 miles (4.0 km) from the end of the bridge to the St. Francis Levee. The total distance from the levee to the South Memphis bluffs was 16,295 feet (4,967 m); only 1,194 feet (364 m) lay in Memphis, Tennessee.

The Harahan Bridge was originally to be named the Rock Island Bridge but was named for James Theodore Harahan, who was president of the Illinois Central Railroad at the time before his untimely death. Harahan was killed in a railroad accident on January 22, 1912 while traveling to Memphis on his private rail car to meet about the construction of the bridge.

== Construction ==
The first work was to build 2 miles (3.2 km) of track from an existing line in the Arkansas flood plains to bring materials in place for construction. When this track was complete, 60 cars of timber waited for delivery. This material was used in building barges used for construction and moving materials into place. The first three months of construction were used to build 15 barges, and a total of 21 barges were needed to complete construction.

The next phase of the project involved building massive willow mats. These mats were constructed on the river. When completed, they measured 200 feet x 300 feet. They were floated to the location of the piers (held in place by barges) and sunk to the bottom of the river with rip-rap and stone. The purpose of the willow mats was to reduce scouring, keeping the river bed in place as the pneumatic caissons were dug into the river bed.

The Harahan Bridge was to be located 200 feet (61 m) north of the Frisco Bridge. Use of pneumatic caissons had been used on the Frisco and other major bridges; this did not eliminate the dangers involved. The Harahan pneumatic caissons were constructed on shore out of wood. The walls were 3 feet (0.91 m) thick, with heavy caulking and tar to make them airtight. The caisson was 40 feet wide x 90 feet long x 60 feet tall. In reality, it was a large wooden box, open at the bottom. The chamber at the bottom of the caisson had a 7-foot ceiling for the sandhogs to work.

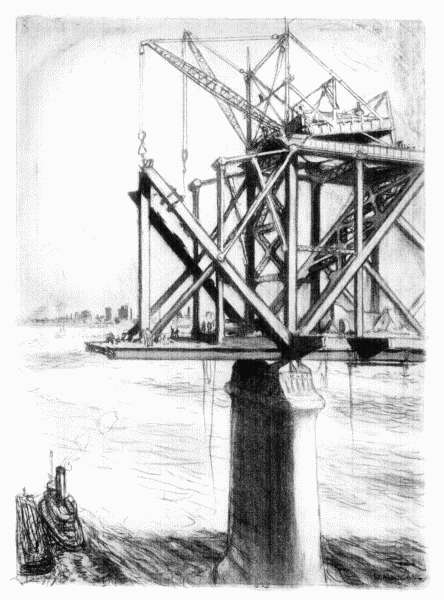
Hanging in the air above the middle of the stream - drawing of the construction of Harahan Bridge, c. 1917

Digging the river bottoms to sink the caissons into the river bed was difficult and dangerous work. All the material inside the walls of the caisson had to be removed to the surface. The caisson was built with excavation shafts for removing dirt and clay. The pressure was increased to match the water pressure, keeping the river water out of the work area. When the pressure was high enough, the excavation shafts were opened and air pressure would remove the light weight river bottom in a "blow off." This eased the process greatly and saved a tremendous amount of time and effort for the sand hogs. It did, however, make a spectacular sight as a fountain of river bottom erupted from the caisson, it also left quite a mess on the top of it and any barges nearby.

As the caissons were being sunk into the riverbed, the piers were being built on top of them, adding weight and driving the caisson deeper into the river bottom. The piers were masonry blocks of granite backed with concrete. The piers of the Harahan were located directly upstream of the piers of the Frisco Bridge to keep the navigation channels open to river traffic. Pier IV was moved 17 feet (5.2 m) toward the river relative to the Frisco Pier IV. This enabled the engineers to design two suspended spans and three cantilevered arms identically.

With the caissons sunk and the substructure complete, work began on the steel superstructure. The longest span between Pier I and Pier II was the first to be built. This span would be built without falsework, employing two cantilevered arms and a suspended arm. The next span to be complete was between Pier II and Pier III, using temporary falsework wood support timbers driven into the river bottom to hold the fixed span in place until it was complete. The span between Pier III and Pier IV was started concurrently. Span II to III was finished on December 22, 1915. On December 24, 1915, the river rose too quickly and washed away the false work. Span II to III was not damaged, although it moved 8 inches (20 cm). Span III to IV was completely washed out, forcing a delay in the construction and a redesign on the span.

On July 14, 1916, the first train crossed the bridge. The celebration that had been planned was cancelled due to the war in Europe. The wagonways were not opened until September 17, 1917. The delay was due to construction problems with a wooden viaduct in Arkansas.

The wagonways are still on the bridge, and the Arkansas approach has road stubs leading towards I-55. (35.135142°N 90.085369°W)

== Big River Crossing ==
One of the former roadways on the north side of the bridge is now used to carry pedestrian and bicycle traffic across the Mississippi River. The bridge is a vital part of a larger project that connects Main Street in Memphis to Broadway in West Memphis, Arkansas. In 2016, it was announced that an anonymous donor had pledged $5 million to illuminate the bridge. The Harahan Bridge became the second illuminated bridge in Memphis and the first to be illuminated by LEDs. Subsequently the lighting features on the nearby Hernando de Soto Bridge upstream were also replaced with an LED system in 2018, allowing the two bridges to display synchronized patterns for holidays and other special events.

== See also ==
- List of crossings of the Lower Mississippi River
