= Frisco Bridge =

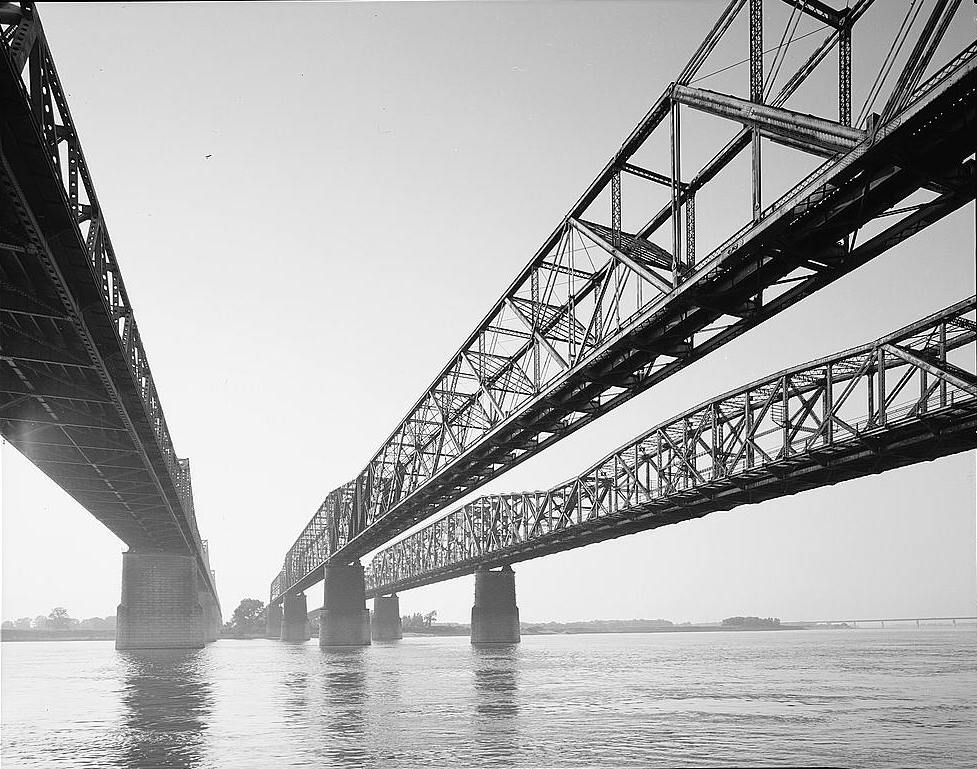
- The Frisco Bridge (center) in 1985. It is flanked by the Memphis & Arkansas Bridge (left) and Harahan Bridge (right)
- Coordinates: 35°07′43″N 90°04′35″W
- Carries: BNSF Railway
- Crosses: Mississippi River
- Locale: West Memphis, Arkansas and Memphis, Tennessee
- Maintained by: BNSF Railway

Characteristics
- Design: Cantilevered through Truss bridge
- Total length: 4,887 feet (1,490 m)
- Width: 30 feet (9 m)
- Longest span: 791 feet (241 m)
- Clearance below: 109 feet (33 m)

Rail characteristics
- No. of tracks: 1

History
- Opened: May 12, 1892

Statistics
- Daily traffic: 32.9 trains per day (as of 2014)

Location
- Interactive map of Frisco Bridge

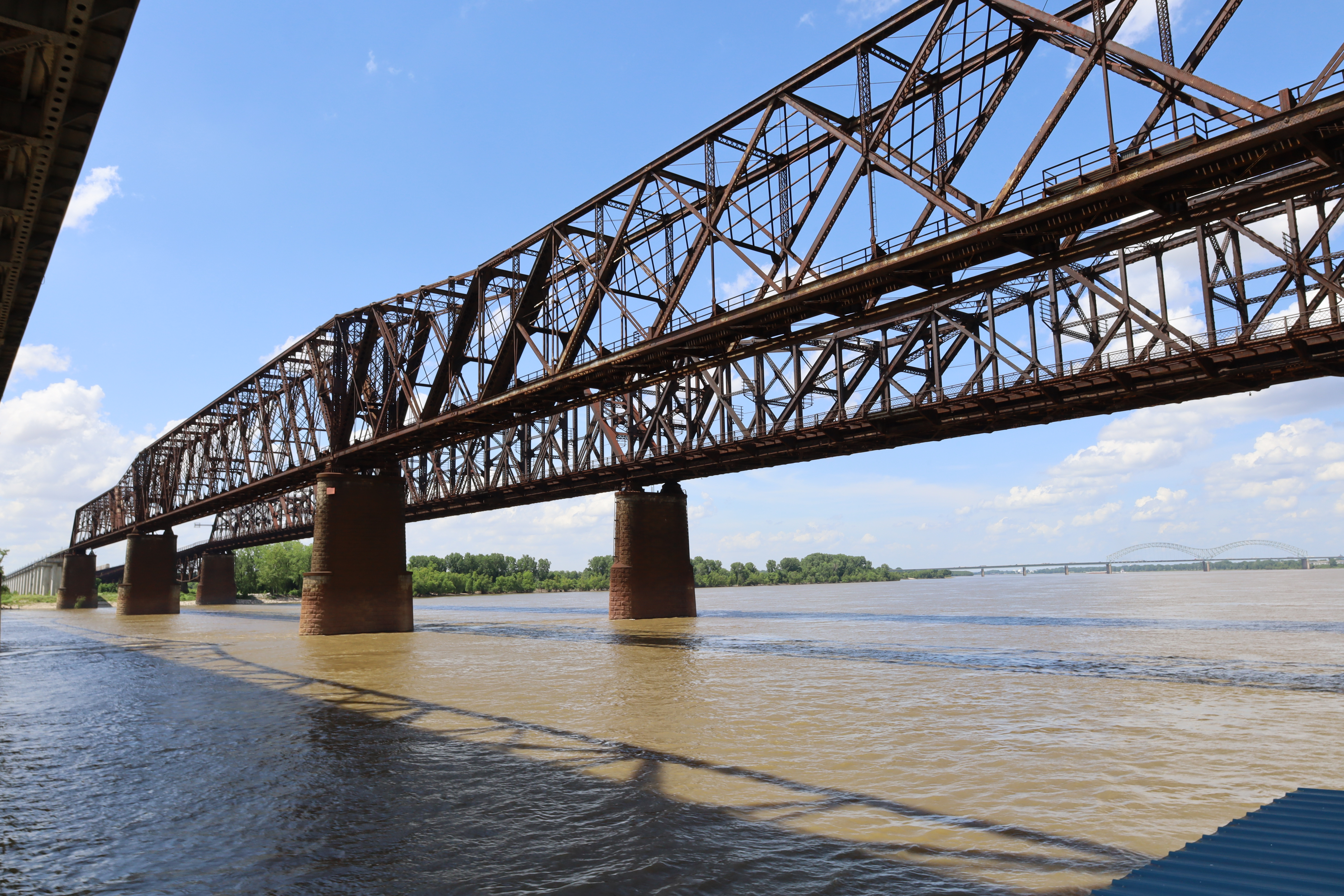
The bridge in 2022

The Frisco Bridge, previously known as the Memphis Bridge, is a cantilevered through truss bridge carrying a rail line across the Mississippi River between West Memphis, Arkansas, and Memphis, Tennessee.

== Construction ==
At the time of the Memphis bridge construction, it was a significant technological challenge and is considered to be chief engineer George S. Morison's crowning achievement. No other bridges had ever been attempted on the Lower Mississippi River.

The bridge is built entirely of open-hearth steel, a newly developed material at the time of construction. The structure features a 790-foot (240 m) main span and two additional 600-foot (180 m) spans. Its 65-foot (20 m) height above the water was the highest clearance of any U.S. bridge of that era. The construction of the piers went nearly 100 feet (30 m) below the water's surface.

Though some sources claim two cantilevered roadways were added to the bridge in the 1930s, one on each side, they probably confuse this bridge with the neighboring Harahan Bridge, which had two cantilevered roadways from 1917 until the Memphis & Arkansas Bridge opened in 1949. (The former roadway on the north side of the Harahan Bridge is now designated as Big River Crossing, having been refitted to carry pedestrian and bicycle traffic across the Mississippi River in 2016.) While the Frisco Bridge has not featured cantilevered roadways, pedestrians, buggies, and some automobiles used its main deck before the Harahan Bridge opened (the bridge was closed to such traffic while a train was crossing).

Construction for the Kansas City, Fort Scott and Memphis Railway, later acquired by the "Frisco," began in 1888 and was completed May 12, 1892. In the end the project created a bridge that was the farthest south on the Mississippi River, featured the longest truss span in the United States and cost nearly 3 million dollars.

A testament to its design and construction, the bridge is still used by BNSF Railway and is being renovated as part of a system-wide BNSF infrastructure improvement program. The west approach to the bridge, which was made of 52 spans totaling 340 feet (100 m) in length, was replaced by a new 27-span bridge. This project was completed in 2017. The bridge was designated as a National Historic Civil Engineering Landmark in 1987.

== See also ==
- List of bridges documented by the Historic American Engineering Record in Arkansas
- List of bridges documented by the Historic American Engineering Record in Tennessee
- List of crossings of the Lower Mississippi River
