= Interstate 55 =

North–south Interstate Highway in the central US

Interstate 55
- I-55 highlighted in red

Route information
- Length: 964.25 mi (1,551.81 km)
- Existed: August 14, 1957–present
- NHS: Entire route

Major junctions
- South end: I-10 in LaPlace, LA
- I-20 / US 49 in Jackson, MS; I-69 in Hernando, MS; I-40 / US 61 / US 64 / US 70 / US 78 / US 79 in West Memphis, AR; I-57 / US 60 in Sikeston, MO; I-44 / I-64 / US 40 in St. Louis, MO; I-70 / US 40 from East St. Louis to Troy, IL; I-74 in Bloomington, IL; I-39 / US 51 in Normal, IL; I-80 in Channahon, IL; I-90 / I-94 in Chicago, IL
- North end: US 41 in Chicago, IL

Location
- Country: United States
- States: Louisiana, Mississippi, Tennessee, Arkansas, Missouri, Illinois

Highway system
- Interstate Highway System; Main; Auxiliary; Suffixed; Business; Future

Interstate 55 (I-55) is a major Interstate Highway in the central United States. As with most primary Interstates that end in a five, it is a major cross-country, north–south route, connecting the Gulf of Mexico to the Great Lakes. The highway travels from LaPlace, Louisiana, at I-10 to Chicago, Illinois, at U.S. Route 41 (US 41), at McCormick Place. The major cities that I-55 connects to are (from south to north); Jackson, Mississippi; Memphis, Tennessee; St. Louis, Missouri; and Chicago, Illinois.

The section of I-55 between Chicago and St. Louis was built as an alternate route for U.S. Route 66 (US 66). The Interstate crosses the Mississippi River twice: once at Memphis and again at St. Louis.

== History ==
When it was realized that a national highway system was needed, the Federal-Aid Highway Act of 1956 provided for a highway replacing the old US 66 which I-55 filled. I-55 was originally constructed in the 1960s, to extend a section of US 66 between I-294 and Gardner which had been converted into a freeway and had Interstate signage installed in 1960. During the rest of the 1960s, I-55 was built in portions throughout Illinois, eventually connecting St. Louis to Chicago, where it became the fourth direct route between them. As it goes southward, most of the Interstate was purpose-built during the 1960s and 1970s. The entire length was completed in 1979.

== Route description ==
Lengths
	mi	km
LA	65.81	105.91
MS	290.41	467.37
TN	12.28	19.76
AR	72.22	116.22
MO	210.45	338.69
IL	293.80	472.72
Total	964.25	1,551.81

=== Louisiana ===
In Louisiana, I-55 runs nearly 66 miles (106 km) from south to north, from I-10 near Laplace (25 miles (40 km) west of New Orleans) to the Mississippi state line near Kentwood. Approximately a third of the distance consists of the Manchac Swamp Bridge, a nearly 23-mile (37 km) causeway, often cited as the third-longest viaduct in the world.

=== Mississippi ===
In Mississippi, I-55 runs 290.5 miles (467.5 km) from the Louisiana border near Osyka to Southaven on the Tennessee border, just south of Memphis, Tennessee. Noteworthy cities and towns that I-55 passes through or close by to are Brookhaven, McComb, Jackson, and Grenada. This highway parallels US 51 in its path roughly through the center of Mississippi. The eight miles (13 km) from Hernando to the Tennessee state line coincide with the newer I-69.

The Mississippi section of I-55 is defined in the Mississippi Code § 65-3-3.

=== Tennessee ===
I-55 in Tennessee lies entirely within the city of Memphis, passing through the southern and western parts of the city and providing a bypass of downtown for motorists who do not want to take I-240 and I-40 through downtown to cross the Mississippi River. The western portion of this highway, which passes through an industrialized section of the city, contains numerous low-clearance bridges and also a very tight 270-degree cloverleaf turn northbound at Crump Boulevard. The Tennessee Department of Transportation (TDOT) currently has an interchange improvement project for this portion. Heavy truck traffic heading to and from Arkansas in this area is hence directed to detour via I-240 and I-40.

For the Tennessee stretch of the Interstate, the usual national freeway speed limit of 70 mph (110 km/h) is reduced to 65 mph (105 km/h).

=== Arkansas ===
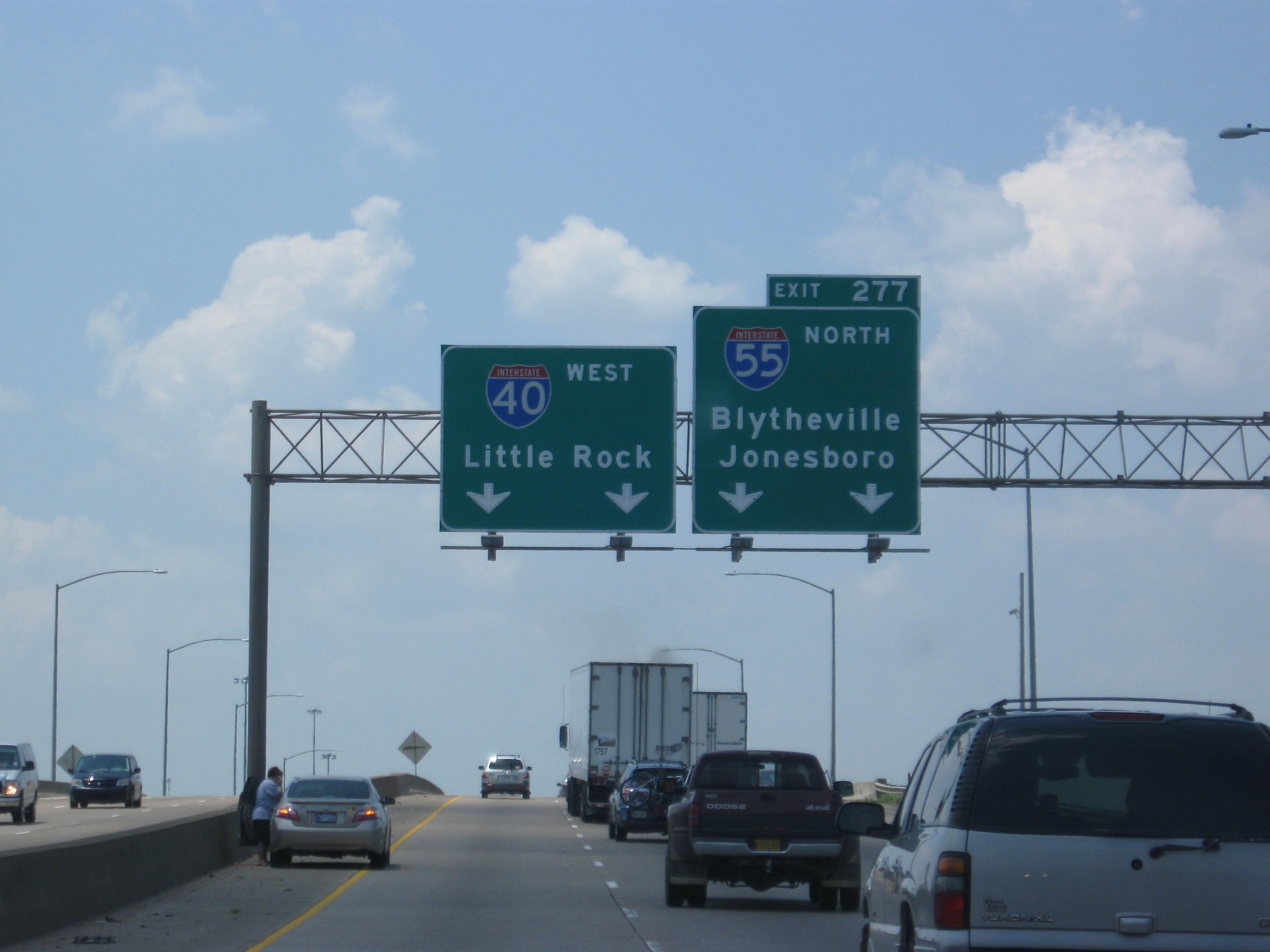
I-55 splits from I-40 here in West Memphis and heads north toward Jonesboro and the Missouri border.

I-55 enters Arkansas from Tennessee as it crosses the Mississippi River on the Memphis & Arkansas Bridge. It overlaps I-40 for approximately 2.8 miles (4.5 km) in West Memphis. After separating from I-40, I-55 turns northward and runs with US 61 and US 64 until US 64 exits in through Marion. I-55/US 61 continues north through Crittenden County through rural farms of the Arkansas Delta, including an interchange with I-555 in Turrell. I-55 passes through Blytheville, where it has a junction with Highway 18 (AR 18) before entering Missouri. I-55 parallels US 61 in its path through Arkansas, which it continues to do after crossing into Missouri.

=== Missouri ===
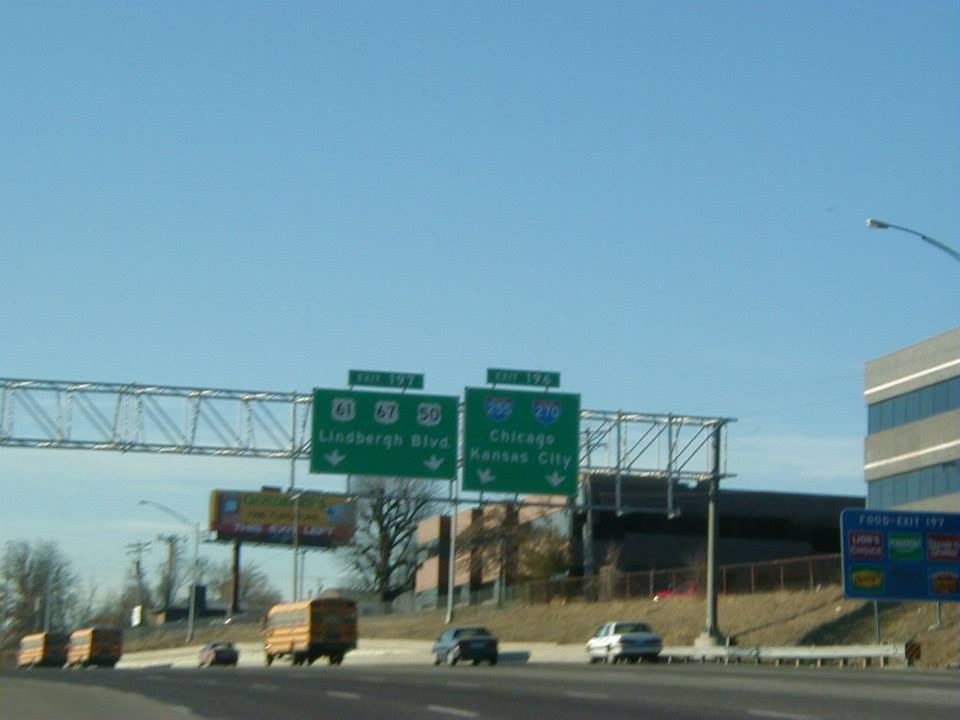
I-55 at Lindbergh Boulevard

In Missouri, I-55 runs from the southeastern part of the state, at the Arkansas border, to St. Louis. In the southern part of the state, I-55 meets I-57 in Sikeston. Then I-55 goes north to St. Louis, where I-44 merges in with I-55, and then I-64 (on the Poplar Street Bridge), when crossing the Mississippi River into Illinois.

Among the cities and towns served by I-55 in Missouri are Sikeston, Cape Girardeau, and St. Louis.

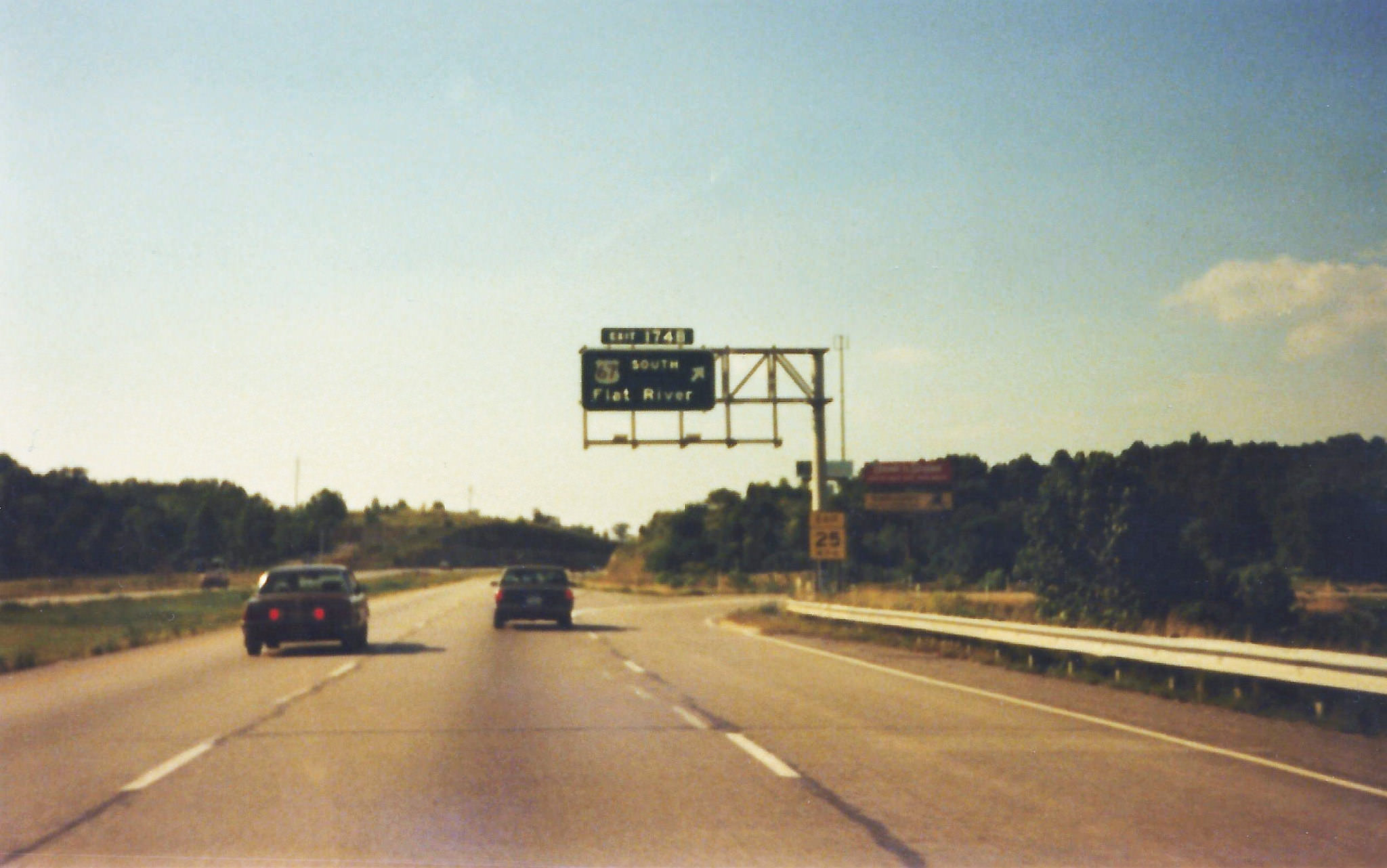
I-55 north at US 67 south, Festus, Missouri

As noted above, I-55 parallels US 61 for most of its course through Missouri, from the Arkansas border to the southern portion of St. Louis County.

=== Illinois ===
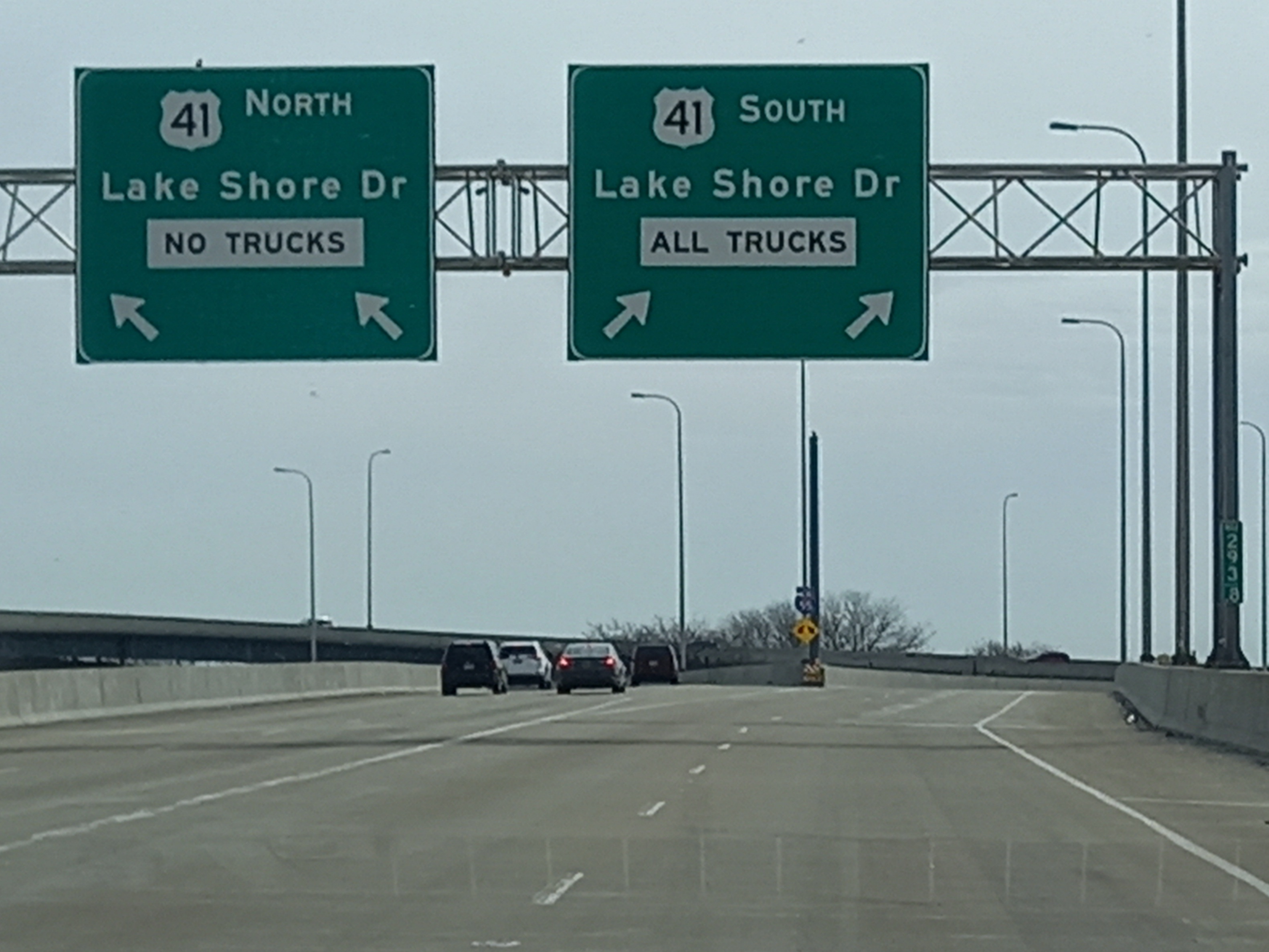
Northern terminus at US 41 (Lake Shore Drive) in Chicago

Through Illinois, I-55 largely follows the 1940 alignment of the former US 66, now Historic US 66 (Illinois Route 66 Scenic Byway). It runs from the Poplar Street Bridge in East St. Louis to US 41 in Chicago, passing around the state capital of Springfield and the metro area of Bloomington–Normal.

Within Illinois, I-55 goes by several names. Near the I-270/I-70 split, it is referred to as the Paul Simon Freeway after former US Senator Paul Simon, who began his political career in this region. Further north, between the St. Louis area and Springfield, I-55 is named the Vince Demuzio Expressway for former Illinois State Senator Vince Demuzio. Finally, in the Chicago area between the I-80 interchange near Joliet and I-55's eastern terminus at US 41 (Lake Shore Drive) in Chicago, the expressway is referred to as the Adlai E. Stevenson Expressway (previously called the Southwest Expressway) in honor of former Illinois governor Adlai E. Stevenson II, who was a two-time Democratic nominee for President of the United States and also the US Ambassador to the United Nations under Presidents John F. Kennedy and Lyndon B. Johnson. In July 2018, the stretch of I-55 from I-294 to milemarker 202 near Pontiac was renamed as Barack Obama Presidential Expressway, after former President Barack Obama.

When the stretch of I-55 through Illinois was being planned during the 1960s, the state's governor, Otto Kerner Jr., made an effort to have it routed close to the larger city of Peoria instead of the straighter route through the Bloomington–Normal area. This ultimately failed plan was ridiculed in the press as the so-called "Kerner Curve". The need for a freeway connection between Springfield and Peoria was later filled by the spur route I-155. This also connects with nearby Lincoln and Morton and forms a triangle between the three population centers in Central Illinois.

== Junction list ==
Louisiana
I-10 in LaPlace
US 51 northeast of LaPlace. The highways travel concurrently to Hammond.
I-12 in Hammond
US 190 in Hammond
Mississippi
US 98 in McComb. The highways travel concurrently to Summit.
US 84 south-southwest of Brookhaven
US 51 in Crystal Springs. The highways travel concurrently to Jackson.
I-20 / US 49 / US 51 in Jackson. I-20/I-55/US 49 travel concurrently to Richland.
I-220 in Ridgeland
US 82 in Winona
US 278 in Batesville
I-69 in Hernando. The highways travel concurrently to Memphis, Tennessee.
Tennessee
US 51 in Memphis
I-69 / I-240 in Memphis
US 61 in Memphis
US 61 / US 64 / US 70 / US 79 in Memphis. I-55/US 61 travels concurrently to Turrell, Arkansas. I-55/US 64 travels concurrently to Marion, Arkansas. I-55/US 70/US 79 travels concurrently to West Memphis, Arkansas.
Arkansas
I-40 in West Memphis. The highways travel concurrently through West Memphis.
I-40 / US 79 in West Memphis
I-555 in Turrell
US 61 in Blytheville
Missouri
US 61 east of Steele. The highways travel concurrently to Portageville.
I-155 / US 412 in Hayti
US 61 / US 62 in New Madrid
US 61 / US 62 north of New Madrid
I-57 / US 60 on the Sikeston–Miner city line
US 62 in Miner
US 61 in Scott City. The highways travel concurrently to Cape Cirardeau.
US 61 in Cape Girardeau
US 61 north-northeast of Jackson
US 61 south-southeast of Festus
US 67 in Festus
I-255 / I-270 on the Concord–Mehlville CDP line
US 50 / US 61 / US 67 on the Concord–Green Park–Mehlville line
I-44 on the McKinley Heights–Soulard, St. Louis neighborhood line. The highways travel concurrently to Downtown St. Louis.
I-44 / I-64 / US 40 in Downtown, St. Louis. I-55/I-64 travels concurrently to East St. Louis, Illinois. I-55/US 40 travels concurrently to Troy, Illinois.
Illinois
I-64 / I-70 in East St. Louis. I-55/I-70 travels concurrently to northwest of Troy.
I-255 in Collinsville
I-70 / I-270 northwest of Troy
I-72 / US 36 in Springfield. The highways travel concurrently through Springfield.
I-155 northwest of Lincoln
US 136 southeast of McLean
I-74 / US 51 in Bloomington. I-55/I-74 travels concurrently to northwest of Normal. I-55/US 51 travels concurrently to Normal.
US 150 in Bloomington
I-39 / US 51 in Normal
US 24 in Chenoa
US 6 in Channahon
I-80 in Channahon
US 52 in Shorewood
US 30 in Joliet
I-355 on the Bolingbrook–Woodridge village line
I-294 on the Burr Ridge–Indian Head Park–Countryside village line
US 12 / US 20 / US 45 on the Countryside–Hodgkins village line
I-90 / I-94 in Armour Square, Chicago
US 41 in Near South Side, Chicago

== Auxiliary routes ==
- Spur to Jonesboro, Arkansas: I-555
- Caruthersville, Missouri to Dyersburg, Tennessee: I-155
- St. Louis, Missouri, area: I-255
- Spur to Peoria, Illinois: I-155
- In the western suburbs of Chicago, Illinois: I-355
