= Memphis & Arkansas Bridge =

Highway bridge in Memphis, Tennessee, US

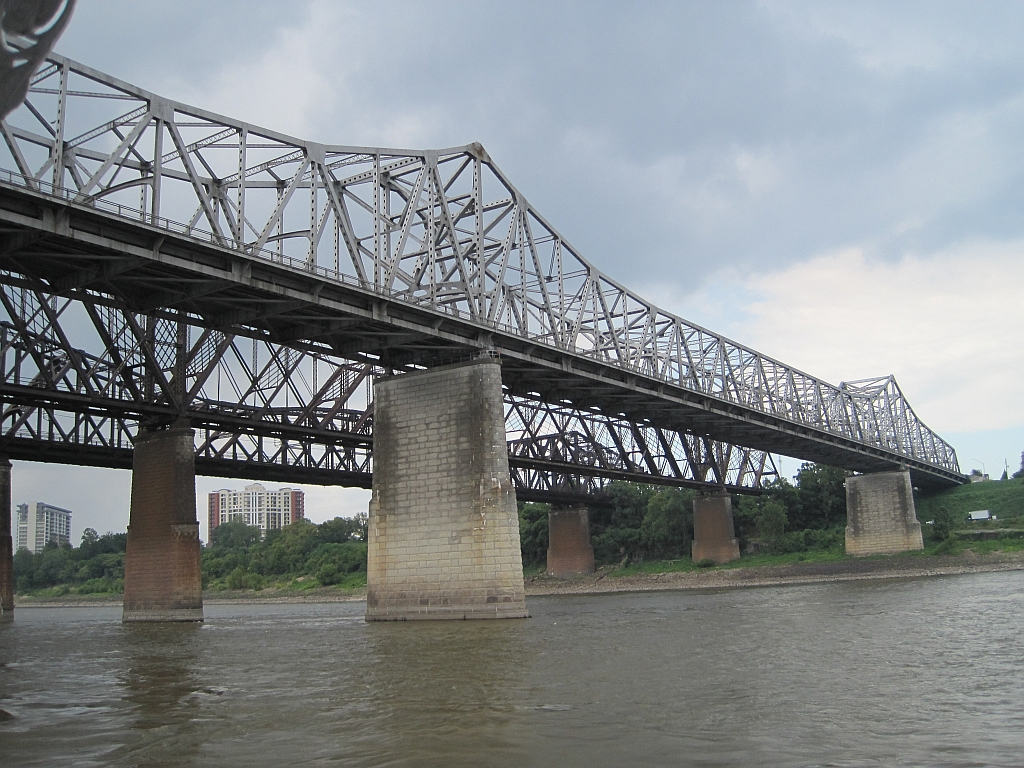
- Memphis & Arkansas Bridge
- Coordinates: 35°7′39.02″N 90°4′32.42″W
- Carries: 4 lanes of I-55 / US 61 / US 64 / US 70 / US 78 / US 79; SR 1
- Crosses: Mississippi River
- Locale: West Memphis, Arkansas and Memphis, Tennessee
- Official name: Memphis & Arkansas Bridge
- Maintained by: TDOT & ARDOT
- ID number: 79I00550101

Characteristics
- Design: Cantilevered through truss bridge
- Total length: 5,222 feet (1,592 m)
- Width: 52 feet (16 m)
- Longest span: 791 feet (241 m)
- Clearance below: 112 feet (34 m)

History
- Construction start: September 12, 1945
- Opened: December 17, 1949

Statistics
- Daily traffic: 62,355 (2016)
- Memphis & Arkansas Bridge
- U.S. National Register of Historic Places
- Location within Tennessee Location within the United States
- Location: Memphis, Tennessee
- Built: 1949
- NRHP reference No.: 01000139
- Added to NRHP: February 16, 2001

Location
- Interactive map of Memphis & Arkansas Bridge

The Memphis & Arkansas Bridge, also known as the Memphis–Arkansas Bridge or inaccurately as the Memphis–Arkansas Memorial Bridge, is a cantilevered through truss bridge carrying Interstate 55 across the Mississippi River between West Memphis, Arkansas, and Memphis, Tennessee. Memphians refer to this bridge as the "Old Bridge" to distinguish it from the "New Bridge", or Hernando de Soto Bridge, upstream.

The Memphis & Arkansas Bridge also carries U.S. Route 61 (US 61), US 64, US 70, US 78, and US 79 from Memphis to West Memphis; it also carried US 63 prior to its truncation (and later rerouting) in Arkansas. The western terminus of Tennessee State Route 1 (SR 1) sits on the Tennessee–Arkansas boundary halfway across the bridge.

Opened in 1949, the bridge is currently the oldest bridge on the Interstate Highway System in Tennessee and Arkansas. It is currently planned to be replaced with a larger and wider bridge, starting in 2026.

== Description ==
The bridge consists of five Warren through trusses, each with a length of 790 feet (240 m). Combined with the approach segments, the bridge's total length is 5,222 feet (1,592 m). Completed in 1949, it is the only bridge spanning the Mississippi River designed to carry exclusively vehicular traffic that was built before 1950. It was designed by Modjeski and Masters, successors to the firm that designed the Harahan Bridge, built in 1916 to carry vehicular and rail traffic. The bridge was listed on the National Register of Historic Places in 2001.

Built before the introduction of the Interstate Highway System, the span was not built to Interstate Highway standards; it originally lacked the concrete barrier between the different directions of traffic which, was added later. It was also built with a sidewalk on either side of the roadway, positioned just outside the steel truss girders. The sidewalks, now also separated from the traffic lanes by concrete barriers, are accessible from Memphis city sidewalks on the Tennessee side, but give way to grassy slopes on the shoulders of I-55 on the Arkansas side.

The sidewalk and bridge is listed as part of the Mississippi River Trail. However, travel is not recommended across the sidewalk and is prohibited on the vehicle traffic lanes of the bridge, as the structure is an Interstate Highway crossing. In 2016, a pedestrian/bicycle path on the neighboring Harahan Bridge made crossing the river safer and eliminated the need to use the I-55 bridge.

Despite common references to this bridge as a "Memorial Bridge", most likely resulting from its opening shortly after World War II, there is no evidence that this bridge was ever intended to be a memorial to anything. There is no mention of any memorial intent on the bridge's nameplates, including a dedicatory poem on one nameplate (officially attributed to Walter Chandler) that appears to focus on the traffic expected to cross the bridge rather than any memorial. (This is in contrast to the Harahan Bridge, which was named for a railroad executive who died in an accident during the bridge's construction.) Crump himself, for whom the boulevard originally leading to the bridge was named, lived until 1954; Chandler lived until 1967.

== Bridge history ==
=== Planning and construction ===
The Memphis & Arkansas Bridge was inspired by the ever increasing flow of traffic on the single-lane cantilevered "wagonways" of the Harahan Bridge from its opening in 1916 all the way to this bridge's opening in 1949. This increased traffic led to the incorporation of West Memphis, Arkansas, in 1927 where the Arkansas roadways leading to the Harahan Bridge came together, as well as the 1930 replacement by the Arkansas State Highway Commission (ASHC), the modern-day version of which oversees the Arkansas Department of Transportation, of the original wooden viaduct leading from West Memphis to the Harahan Bridge. Most of the 1930 viaduct was reused for the Memphis & Arkansas Bridge until the present I-55 viaduct replaced it in the 1980's; a small portion of that viaduct now serves as the Arkansas entrance to the Harahan Bridge's Big River Crossing (built on one of its former "wagonways").

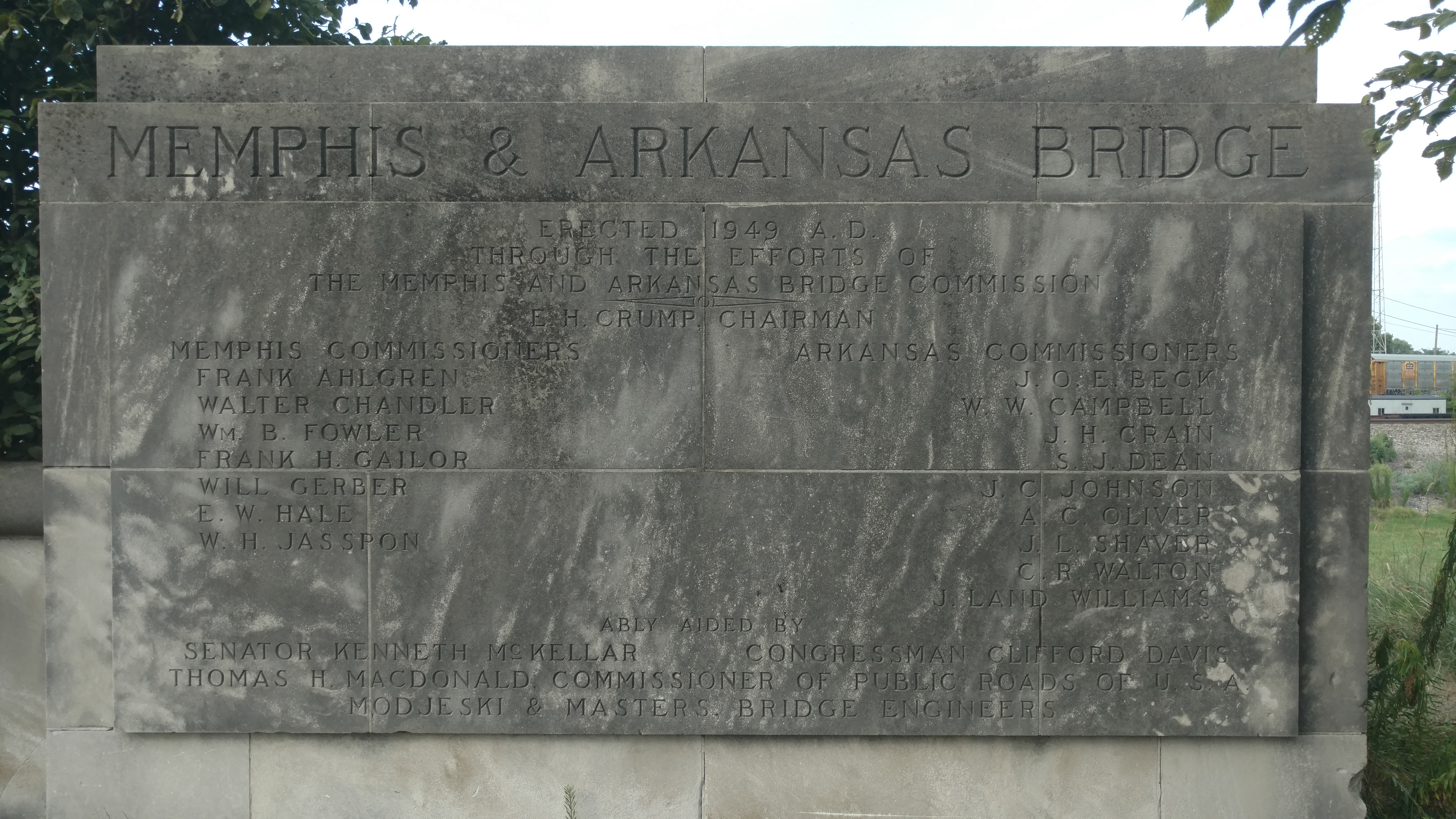
Original 1949 Memphis nameplate of Memphis & Arkansas Bridge, showing its correct name as well as its planning commission headed by E. H. Crump.

Planning for the new bridge began in 1939 with the creation of a joint Memphis-Arkansas bridge commission headed by longtime Memphis political boss E. H. Crump. Walter Chandler, another notable Tennessee politician who was a member of the Crump machine at that time, also served on the bridge commission. Simultaneously with the bridge, Crump planned a new bypass street leading to the bridge, avoiding both downtown Memphis and historic African American neighborhoods to the south, which came to be known as Crump Boulevard. Aretha Franklin was born on Lucy Avenue, in just such a neighborhood south of Crump Boulevard, in 1942 before moving eventually to Detroit where she became famous as the Queen of Soul.

By May 1944, the ASHC and Tennessee's Department of Highways and Public Works (now the Tennessee Department of Transportation or TDOT) hired Modjeski and Masters, the firm founded by Ralph Modjeski who designed the Harahan Bridge in 1916 and helped design the area's original Frisco Bridge in 1892, to prepare plans for this bridge even though Modjeski himself died in 1940. Though truss bridges increasingly fell out of fashion after World War II, this bridge's truss design, especially its main span, was largely dictated by the neighboring Frisco & Harahan Bridges and the established navigation channel beneath them. Construction on the bridge began on September 12, 1945, and the bridge opened to traffic on December 17, 1949.

=== Later history ===
Though Crump Boulevard was originally intended to serve as the main access to the bridge from Memphis, TDOT replaced the west end of Crump Boulevard with a stretch of I-55 in the late 1960's. The issues resulting from the cloverleaf interchange at I-55 and Crump, required to accommodate a 90-degree change in I-55's direction onto the bridge, have led to more recent traffic problems including a failed TDOT plan that would have required a long-term closure of I-55 and the bridge in order to reconstruct the interchange, as well as lane closures and other issues at the interchange during the 2021 I-40 bridge closure during which this was the only open bridge at Memphis.

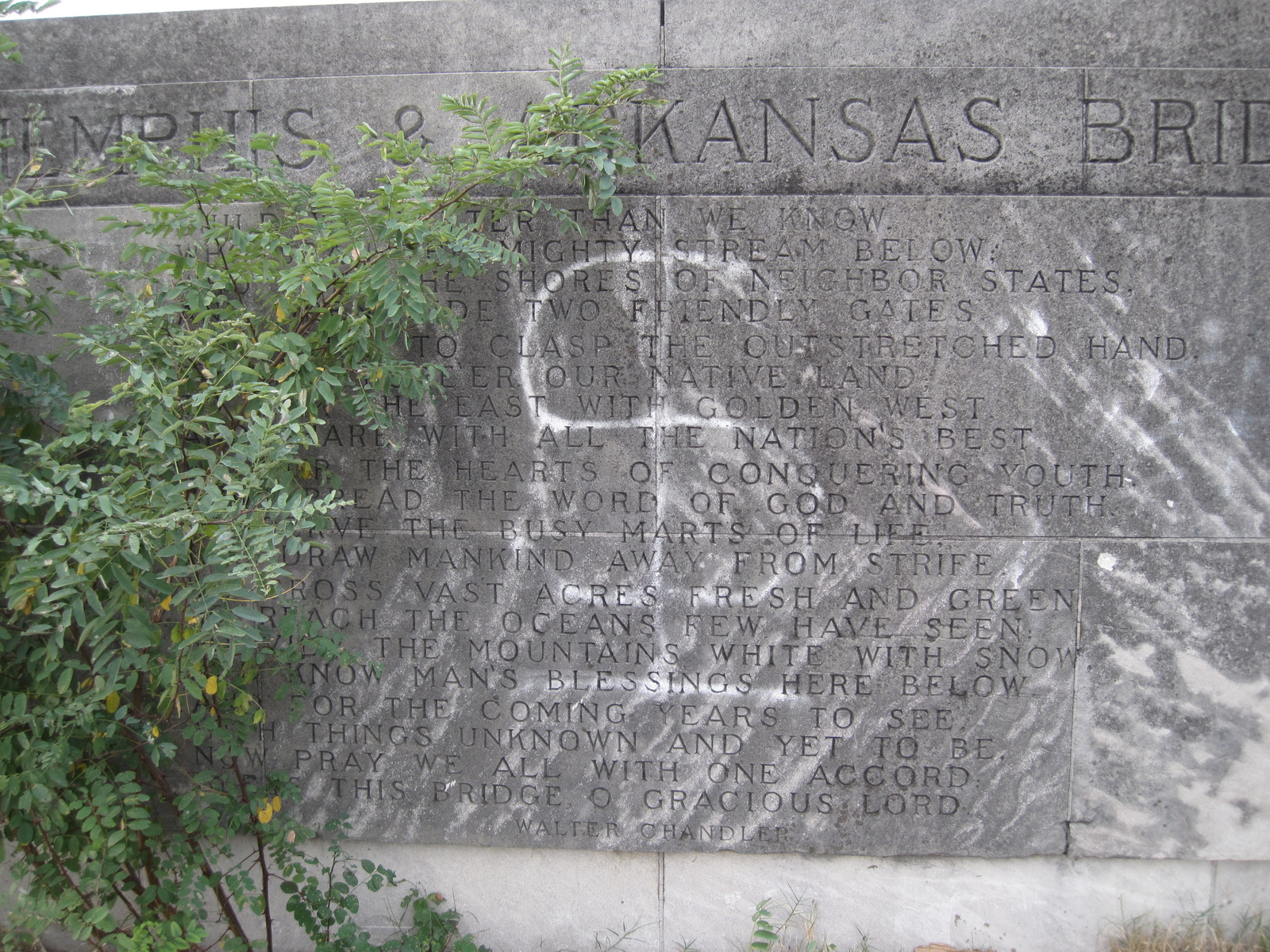
Photo of dedicatory poem opposite nameplate, officially attributed to Walter Chandler.

On August 12, 2012, a cyclist was killed after being struck by a vehicle when using the shoulder approaching the bridge. On December 23, 2014, numerous news sources reported that the FBI had released an official statement warning local law enforcements of a threat to the bridge during that month. The FBI stated, "according to an anonymous complainant... ISIS instructed an ISIS member, a presumed USPER (U.S. person) in Memphis, with a direct order to blow up the Memphis–Arkansas bridge on an unknown date, activating ISIS terror cells in the United States." Security was heightened, but the threat was later discredited.

== Replacement ==
The need to eventually replace the Memphis & Arkansas Bridge has been recognized for some time, due to its age and the fact that it was not designed to withstand a high magnitude earthquake, as well as its violations of Interstate Highway standards. The need for a new bridge was once again thrust into the spotlight when the Hernando de Soto Bridge was closed to all traffic between May 11 and August 2, 2021, due to a fracture in the structure. This forced much of the traffic on I-40 to detour across the Memphis & Arkansas Bridge. Later that year, the Infrastructure Investment and Jobs Act (IIJA) was enacted by Congress. This legislation includes the Bridge Investment Program (BIP), which provides $7.25 billion in federal funding until 2026 for bridge projects costing over $100 million. These projects are awarded in competitive grants at 50% of the total cost. On April 17, 2023, Governor Bill Lee signed into law the Transportation Modernization Act, which provides increased funding for highway projects in Tennessee. Six months later TDOT and ARDOT completed a study on the possibility of a new bridge in Memphis, which found that replacing the Memphis & Arkansas bridge would be the most cost-effective option. On December 4, 2023, TDOT and ARDOT jointly submitted an application for a grant under the BIP to replace the Memphis & Arkansas Bridge. Under the terms of the application, TDOT and ARDOT have agreed to each pay for 25% of the total cost of the bridge, which is tentatively expected to cost $787.5 million, although the final figure could be higher. On July 12, 2024, a $394 million grant was awarded for the replacement. This project, which has been named "America's River Crossing", is tentatively planned to begin in 2026.

== Traffic mix ==
Annual average daily traffic (AADT) figures reported by the Tennessee Department of Transportation for 2018, three years before the notable 2021 closure of the I-40 Hernando de Soto Bridge or "new bridge", show that the I-55 "old bridge" carries substantially more vehicles (64,520) than the I-40 bridge (37,308) despite its being older and narrower. Meanwhile, similar figures reported by the Arkansas Department of Transportation for 2020, the year before the I-40 bridge closure, from devices that also measure percentage of truck traffic suggest that though the I-40 bridge had slightly more vehicles (47,000) than the I-55 bridge (45,000), the I-55 bridge actually had a higher percentage of truck traffic (37 percent) than the I-40 bridge (26 percent). Traffic counts dropped substantially during the Crump interchange reconstruction.

== In popular culture ==
The bridge can be seen in scenes of the 1989 film Great Balls of Fire! starring Dennis Quaid as Jerry Lee Lewis.

The bridge is referenced in the Chuck Berry song "Memphis, Tennessee," (later covered by Johnny Rivers) where it is simply called "the Mississippi bridge."

== See also ==
- List of crossings of the Lower Mississippi River
- List of bridges on the National Register of Historic Places in Arkansas
- List of bridges on the National Register of Historic Places in Tennessee
- National Register of Historic Places listings in Crittenden County, Arkansas
- National Register of Historic Places listings in Shelby County, Tennessee
