= Tennessee State Route 176 =

State highway in Tennessee, United States

State Route 176
- Getwell Road
- SR 176 highlighted in red

Route information
- Maintained by TDOT
- Length: 6.1 mi (9.8 km)
- Existed: July 1, 1983–present

Major junctions
- South end: Getwell Road (Mississippi Highway 747) at the Mississippi State Line near Southaven, MS
- US 78 in Memphis
- North end: I-240 in Memphis

Location
- Country: United States
- State: Tennessee
- Counties: Shelby

Highway system
- Tennessee State Routes; Interstate; US; State
← SR 175	→ SR 177

State Route 176 (SR 176) is a north–south state highway located entirely within Memphis, Tennessee.

== Route description ==
SR 176 runs from Interstate 240 (I-240) south to the Mississippi state line. The state highway portion varies between two and three lanes on each side. The portion that runs between Knight Arnold Road and Winchester Road is built as a four-lane freeway. A wide median (with a fairly large drainage ditch) and grade-separated interchanges at major routes exist in the portion between Winchester Road and E. Raines Road. The speed limit is 40 mph (64 km/h). This route is more commonly known as Getwell Road and New Getwell Road (between Knight Arnold Rd. and Raines Rd.) (New Getwell Rd. bypasses older 2-lane sections of Getwell Road now named Old Getwell Road).

== History ==
The original name of the road was Shotwell Road, named after one of the founding families. However, in the 1940s, the road's name was changed as a "good faith" gesture. This change occurred because the local V.A. hospital's address was on Shotwell Road, and large numbers of wounded American servicemen were being brought in by train. Presently, there are a couple of residential blocks still named Shotwell located north of Park Avenue, in line with Getwell. It's important to note that these residential blocks are not designated as part of State Highway 176.

== Major intersections ==
The entire route is in Memphis, Shelby County.

mi	km	Destinations	Notes
0.0	0.0	Getwell Road (MS 747 south)	Mississippi state line; southern terminus
1.8	2.9	SR 175 (E Shelby Drive)	
3.9– 4.1	6.3– 6.6	Winchester Road	Interchange; south end of freeway
4.3– 4.5	6.9– 7.2	US 78 (Lamar Avenue/SR 4)	Interchange
4.8– 5.1	7.7– 8.2	Knight Arnold Road	Interchange; north end of freeway
5.8– 6.1	9.3– 9.8	I-240	I-240 exit 20 westbound, 20 A/B eastbound; northern terminus; roadway continues north as Getwell Road
1.000 mi = 1.609 km; 1.000 km = 0.621 mi
