= Roads in Memphis, Tennessee =

The roads in Memphis, Tennessee, include Interstate 40 (I-40), I-55, I-69, and I-240 with interchanges near the city center, and I-269 with interchanges serving the eastern outskirts. There are eight U.S. Highways serving the city. One beltway surrounds Memphis within the city, plus an additional semi-beltway surrounds the outer reaches of the city.

== Interstates ==
Interstate highway	Additional information
I-40	A major east–west interstate that enters the city from Arkansas. The highway continues into the west and north sides of downtown Memphis, then towards Bartlett, and exits the city prior to entering northern Fayette and Haywood Counties
I-55	A major north–south interstate that enters the city from northwest Mississippi, bypasses the downtown area, and leaves the city via the Memphis & Arkansas Bridge into Arkansas.
I-69	A future interstate route that will be extended southward from western Kentucky and southern Indiana to parallel US 51.
I-240	The inner beltway that runs from I-40 in downtown Memphis southward, and then turns east from the I-55 junction, and then north to I-40
I-269	The future outer beltway in eastern and northern Shelby County that will serve as an auxiliary route of I-69. It will follow SR 385 from Collierville on the Shelby-Fayette County line all the way to the junction with US 51 north of downtown.

Additionally, I-22, which travels concurrently with U.S. Route 78, also serves the area as a connecting freeway from the Memphis area to Birmingham, Alabama. I-22's western terminus is currently located at the I-269 junction near Byhalia, Mississippi.

== U.S. Highways ==
Route number	Local street name(s)
US 51	Elvis Presley Boulevard, Thomas Street, Thomas Road
US 61	3rd Street
US 64	E.H. Crump Boulevard, Danny Thomas Boulevard, Union Avenue, East Parkway, Summer Avenue, Stage Road
US 70	E.H. Crump Boulevard, Danny Thomas Boulevard, Union Avenue, East Parkway, Summer Avenue
US 72	Poplar Avenue, Tupelo Highway
US 78	Lamar Avenue
US 79	E.H. Crump Boulevard, Danny Thomas Boulevard, Union Avenue, East Parkway, Summer Avenue

== State routes ==
Route number	Local street name(s)
SR 1 (Note: Secret, or hidden state highway designation associated with a U.S. Route.)	E.H. Crump Boulevard, Danny Thomas Boulevard, Union Avenue, Thomas Street, North Parkway, Summer Avenue
SR 3	Elvis Presley Boulevard, 2nd Street, Thomas Street, Thomas Road
SR 4	Lamar Avenue
SR 14	3rd Street, A.W. Willis Avenue, Jackson Avenue, Austin Peay Highway
SR 15	James Road
SR 23	Walnut Grove Road
SR 57	Poplar Avenue
SR 86	Tupelo Highway
SR 175	Weaver Road, Shelby Drive, Byhalla Road
SR 176	Getwell Road
SR 177	Germantown Road
SR 204	Covington Pike, Sargent Walter K. Singleton Parkway
SR 205	Collierville-Arlington Road, Airline Road
SR 277	
SR 300	
SR 385	Bill Morris Parkway, Future I-269, Winfield Dunn Parkway (a.k.a. Memphis Outer Beltway), Paul Barrett Memorial Parkway
SR 388	Winfield Street

== Other notable roadways ==
- Sam Cooper Boulevard

== See also ==
- Transportation in Memphis, Tennessee
- Tennessee Department of Transportation
- List of numbered highways in Tennessee
- List of state routes in Tennessee
