= Tennessee State Route 223 =

State highway in Tennessee, United States

State Route 223
- SR 223 highlighted in red

Route information
- Maintained by TDOT
- Length: 15.1 mi (24.3 km)
- Existed: July 1, 1983–present

Major junctions
- South end: SR 138 near Mercer
- US 70 in Jackson
- North end: I-40 in Jackson

Location
- Country: United States
- State: Tennessee
- Counties: Madison

Highway system
- Tennessee State Routes; Interstate; US; State
← SR 222	→ SR 224

State Route 223 (SR 223) is a state route in Madison County, Tennessee. It runs from SR 138 near Mercer to I-40, just west of Jackson. The highway is the main access road for McKellar-Sipes Regional Airport, the regional airport for Jackson and the surrounding areas. Also, TDOT's Region 4 office is located at the highway's interchange with I-40.

== Route description ==
SR 223 begins as Shady Grove Road just east of Mercer at an intersection with SR 138. It goes northeast through farmland and wooded areas to pass through Denmark, where it makes a sharp right turn onto Denmark Jackson Road. It then continues north through rural areas to come to a Y-Intersection, where it turns off of Denmark Jackson Road onto Smith Lane. SR 223 then enters then city limits of Jackson, where it passes by McKellar-Sipes Regional Airport and Tennessee College of Applied Technology at Jackson (TCAT) before coming to an intersection with US 70/SR 1. SR 223 then continues north through farmland before coming to an end at an interchange with I-40 (Exit 76).

The portion from the southern terminus to the airport is a rural 2 lane highway and the part from the airport to the northern terminus is a 4-lane divided highway and runs through a mixed rural/industrial area.

== Major intersections ==
The entire route is in Madison County.

Location	mi	km	Destinations	Notes
	0.0	0.0	SR 138 – Mercer, Toone	Southern terminus
Jackson	12.3	19.8	Airport Boulevard – McKellar-Sipes Regional Airport	Access road into airport
Jackson	13.0	20.9	US 70 (Airways Boulevard/SR 1) – Brownsville, Downtown	
Jackson	15.1	24.3	I-40 – Memphis, Nashville	I-40 exit 76; northern terminus
1.000 mi = 1.609 km; 1.000 km = 0.621 mi
