= Toone =

Toone or To1 may refer to:

== People with the surname ==
- Ella Toone (born 1999), English association football player
- Geoffrey Toone (1910–1995), Irish actor
- Philip Toone (born 1965), Canadian politician
- Spencer Toone (born 1985), American football player
- Tim Toone (born 1985), American football player

== Places ==
- Toone, Tennessee

== Arts ==
- Royal Theatre of Toone, a puppet theatre in Brussels, Belgium

== Others ==
- To1, a South Korean boy band, formerly known as TOO
