= Binghampton, Memphis =

Human settlement in Memphis, Tennessee, U.S.

Coordinates: 35.1501°N 89.9695°W

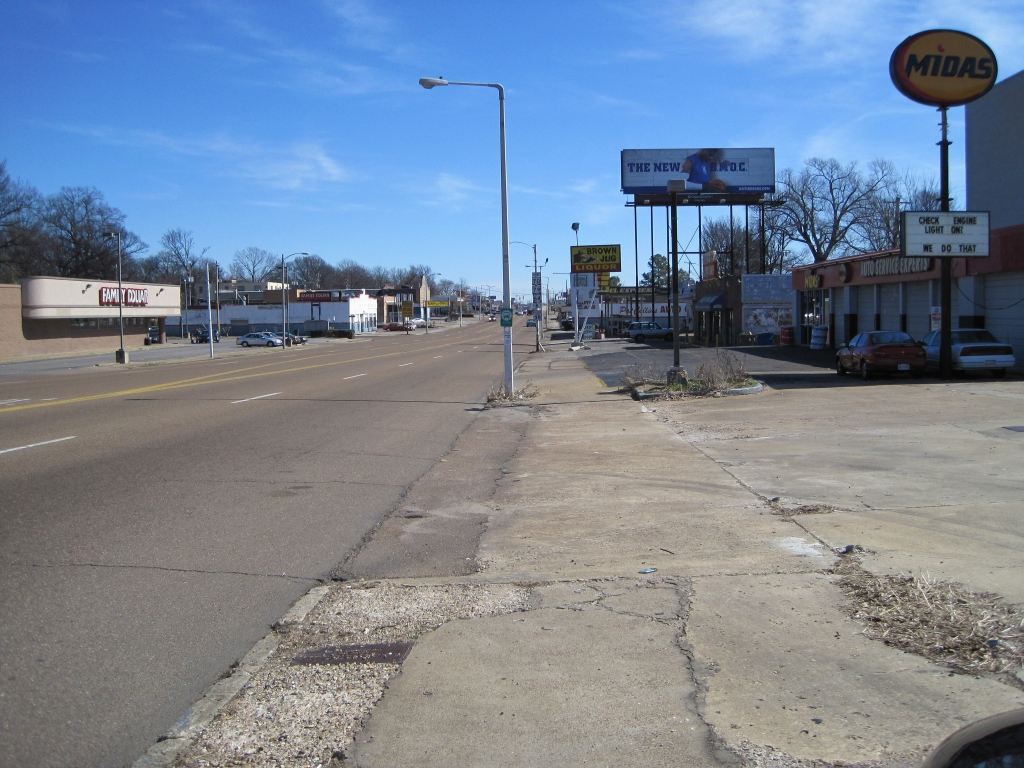
Summer Ave in Binghampton (2010)

Binghampton (also spelled as Binghamton) is a neighborhood on an edge of Midtown in Memphis, Tennessee. It is named after W. H. Bingham, an Irish immigrant, hotelier, planter, magistrate, politician, and entrepreneur who founded a town to the east and slightly north of the Memphis city limits in 1893.

== Geography ==
Binghampton, a neighborhood at the convergence of Midtown and North Memphis, is bordered by the CSX railroad in the North, Holmes Street in the East, Poplar Avenue in the South and East Parkway North and North Trezevant Street in the West. Neighborhoods surrounding Binghampton are Hyde Park on the north, Hollywood on the northwest, Nutbush on the northeast, Highland Heights on the east, Chickasaw Gardens on the south and the Overton Park side of Evergreen on the west.

== History ==
In the late 19th and early 20th centuries, the rural Memphis town of Binghampton was founded as an independent, integrated community. The town developed around a freight car factory that made primarily wooden boxcars for a railroad along a light rail line to Raleigh Springs spa and resort. Binghampton was populated primarily by the blue-collar factory workers. The original city limits ran along Broad Avenue, which included the streetcar line, east to the Beltline railroad (just west of present Scott Street), south to Poplar Avenue, west to Vine Street (now known as Hollywood Street), and north again to Broad. As the town grew, it took in more acreage, expanding in the east to Holmes Street, or a little beyond, and north, first to Summer Avenue, and then in stages farther north. The local economy was very dependent on the factory's payroll, as well as that of the larger city and country. Binghampton had its own power plant and municipal water, located by the carbarns for the Raleigh Springs Electric Railway, where the Chickasaw Country Club's clubhouse now stands. Groceries, a drugstore, a post office, police department, jail, bakeries, and eleven saloons once faced the factory across Broad on the south. The L&N Railway built a station at the intersection with the light rail line, where the Beltline crosses Broad at Scott Street. Annexed by Memphis in 1919 when the city's growth pushed to the east, Binghampton was eventually surrounded by more affluent neighborhoods. The town had incurred some debt, and was willing to be annexed. Now a "neighborhood" within the larger city, Binghampton's limits were not so sharply defined.

Binghampton proper has experienced shifting character as a result of development, and a transition from owner to renter occupied housing.

== Revitalization attempts ==
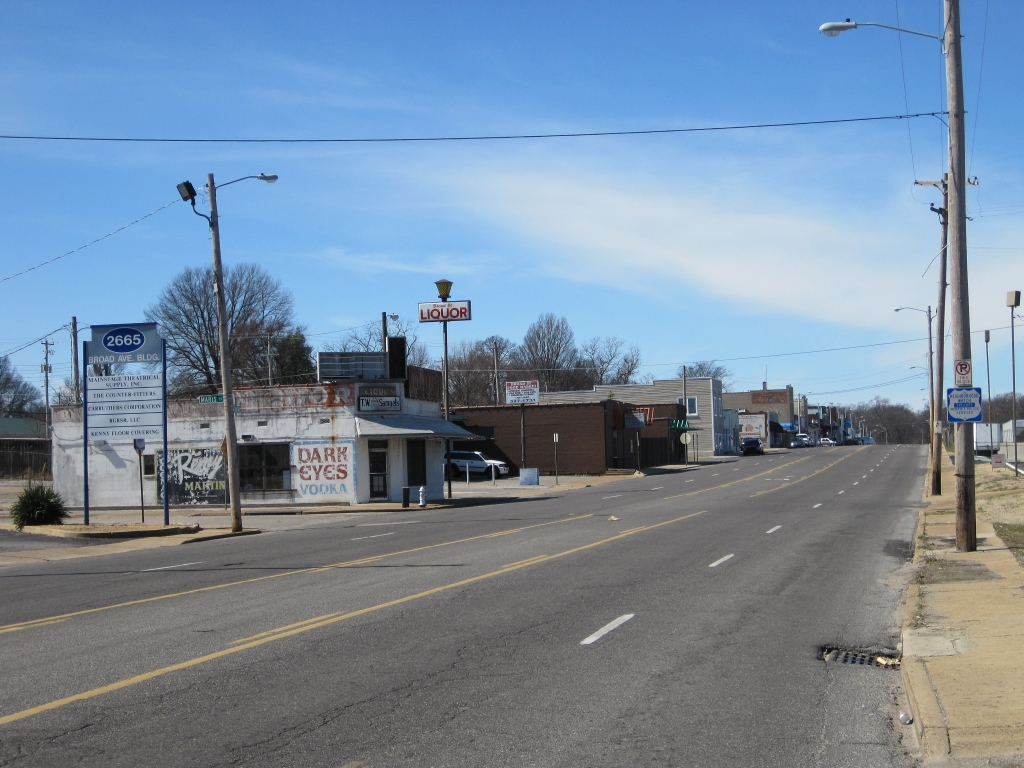
Broad Avenue (2010)

Sam Cooper Boulevard is a highway owned by the City of Memphis which interrupts the Binghampton neighborhood. In 2006, citizens from the neighborhood voiced concerns about negative effects that the completion of the western portion of Sam Cooper Boulevard has had on the community. Claims were made that construction of the road between North Highland Street and East Parkway North cut the Binghampton area in half (echoing identical claims fifty years earlier regarding I-40 and Highland Heights) by creating "high-speed traffic" and "confusing traffic patterns." It was mentioned that the routing of Sam Cooper Boulevard to the south of Broad Avenue had "effectively made" the 1.4 miles (2.3 km) long stretch of Broad Avenue a "ghost town," creating vacant lots in the partly industrial area and an unsafe neighborhood.

The Memphis Flyer cites Robert Montague, executive director of the Binghampton Development Corporation: "When they built Sam Cooper, this area really got buried." Citizens suggested changes in the zoning and a re-design of the Broad Avenue area north of Sam Cooper Boulevard and south of Summer Avenue to re-vitalize that part of the neighborhood and attract business and residents.

The following year, trees and shrubs were planted alongside Sam Cooper Boulevard and in the median west of North Highland Street. A few decorative flowerbeds were also installed in the median of the road to enhance the parkway design of the road.

In May 2011, French artist Guillaume Alby painted a large 1,800-square-foot geometrically styled mural on the 2500 block of Broad Avenue that runs through Binghampton. A series of other art projects followed. These included another mural on a warehouse wall facing the street and the lighting-up of the iconic watertower which identifies Broad Avenue, also now painted, among many others.

It is also home to a bi-annual art walk, in which local artists display their wares along the street. The event is accompanied by free music and food from local restaurants and bakeries. Broad Avenue is also currently the home of the Memphis Greenline (cycling path) headquarters, and was used as an early demonstration of proposed bike lanes for the city of Memphis. The demonstration, which proved to be a success (resulting in the permanent addition of bike lanes) was arranged by Livable Memphis. In June 2011, it was proposed as a connector for cyclists between Overton Park and Shelby Farms Park, two key locations in Memphis.

For years, Binghampton, bordered by Poplar, East Parkway, Summer, and Holmes, has suffered from blight, crime, poverty, and a perception problem. But thanks in part to the success of the neighborhood's Broad Avenue Arts District, the now almost completed Hampline (a two-way bicycle lane through the neighborhood connecting with the Shelby Farms Greenline's entrance on Tillman), and the work of the Mayor's Innovation Delivery Team and Community L.I.F.T. (a neighborhood revitalization program that connects projects with funding sources), the area has been getting more positive attention from outsiders. The grocery store project, rumored for years (Binghampton is a notorious food-desert) is finally underway at the corner of Sam Cooper and Tillman: a supermarket, no less. There has not been a drugstore closer than Jackson Avenue or Highland Heights in decades. Possibly this store, following recent trends, will include a pharmacy.

== Crime ==
=== Random shootings at cars (2004) ===
In 2004, it was reported by local newsmedia that several cars driving on Sam Cooper Boulevard had been shot at in the section west of Tillman Street and east of North Hollywood Street in the Binghampton neighborhood. The Memphis Police Department (MPD) reported 13 shootings between August and October of that year. A spokesman of the MPD stated that only vehicle damage had occurred and that no people were hurt in the shootings. Police recovered a nine millimeter bullet from the front door of one vehicle. A special police task force was assigned to the case. It is not known if the shooter was caught.

=== The Lester Street Murders (2008) ===
On March 3, 2008, a number of bodies were discovered in a residence at 722 Lester Street. Upon responding to a call from a woman concerned about her son and his father, Memphis police discovered six individuals murdered inside the home, four adults and two children. Three other children were also found seriously injured. Autopsies determined that the adult victims had been shot multiple times with a semi-automatic weapon and the children had been stabbed multiple times and received blunt trauma to the head.

Initially, police believed that the massacre was a result of gang activity. Upon further investigation, Jessie Dotson (who was related to three of the victims) was found to be the murderer. Dotson, who had previously served time in prison for killing a man during a botched drug deal in 1994, confessed that he had gotten into an argument with his younger brother Cecil Dotson and shot him to death. In order to eliminate witnesses, he attempted to murder the rest of the individuals who were in the house at that time. Dotson confessed to Memphis Police Lieutenant Toney Armstrong as well as to his own mother that he had committed the murders, although he recanted his statement the following day. Dotson was tried and convicted on six counts of first-degree murder and three counts of attempted murder. He received six death sentences for the murders, plus 40 years for the attempted murders of each of his nephews and his niece, totaling 120 years. The children were 9, 5, and 3 months old at the time of the attacks.

The massacre drew nationwide media coverage and was featured on A&E's The First 48. In 2013, Jessie Dotson's conviction was upheld on appeal. According to court records, Cecil Dotson was a member of the Gangster Disciples and Jessie was a Kitchen Crip. As of 2023, Jessie Dotson's execution has not been carried out and he remains incarcerated on death row by the Tennessee Department of Corrections at the Riverbend Maximum Security Institution in Nashville. All three of the surviving children have recovered from the majority of the physical injuries inflicted upon them.

== Education ==
The two public schools in the Binghampton area are Lester Elementary School and Brewster Elementary School.

In the fall of 2012, Cornerstone Preparatory School, a PreK-3 charter school with plans to expand to the sixth grade, opened in the Lester Elementary School building. It is a part of the Achievement School District (ASD). Jane Roberts of the Memphis Commercial Appeal wrote that the Binghampton families did not trust the school. In 2012 parents in Binghampton accused the ASD of not allowing them to make local decisions regarding the education of their children.

In addition to the public school options, residents may attend Binghampton Christian Academy, a Pre-Kindergarten through 8th-grade private Christian school that has existed for over 20 years and was formerly titled The Neighborhood School. The Roman Catholic church in old Binghampton also provides a grammar school. The original church was fashioned from W. H. Bingham's house.

In 2008, a private school was founded called The Collegiate School of Memphis.
