= Avron Fogelman =

American sports executive

Avron B. Fogelman
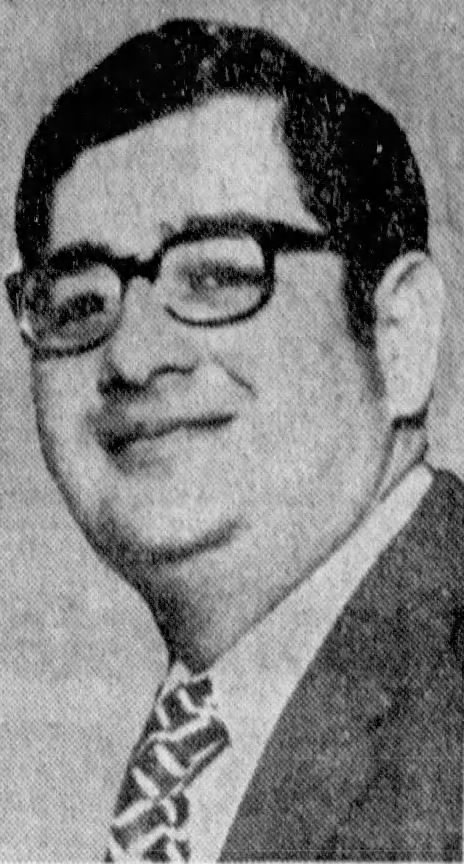
- Fogelman c. 1972
- Born: March 1, 1940; Memphis, Tennessee
- Education: Tulane University
- Occupations: businessman, entrepreneur

Avron B. Fogelman (born March 1, 1940) is an American businessman and real estate developer. He was a former part owner of the Major League Baseball's Kansas City Royals as well as several Memphis-based sports teams.

Fogelman was first involved in sports as president of Memphis Sounds, the first professional basketball team in the state through the American Basketball Association.

== Early life ==
Fogelman was born to Morris and Mollye Fogelman, members of Memphis, Tennessee's Temple Israel. At a young age, he played at the Rotary International Club league at Overton Park.

He attended Memphis City public schools and graduated from Central High School in 1958. He received a Bachelor of Arts degree from Tulane University. Though dropping out a year in, he attended the University of Memphis School of Law, eventually earning an honorary law degree. While a student at Tulane, Fogelman was a member of the Zeta Beta Tau fraternity.

== Later life ==
He was a former part-owner of the Kansas City Royals from 1983 to 1991. He also owned the Memphis Chicks, a minor league baseball team, as well as the Memphis Rogues, a professional soccer team, and the Memphis Sounds, an American Basketball Association team.

He founded the University of Memphis' Fogelman Scholars Program. He helped fund extensive renovations to Tulane Gym, home of the Green Wave basketball team; the gym was renamed Avron B. Fogelman Arena in his honor.

== Honors ==
In 1987, Fogelman received the Distinguished Alumni Award from the University of Memphis.

In 1988, the southeastern leg of Interstate 240 in Memphis was named the "Avron B. Fogelman Expressway".

The religious school at Temple Israel in Memphis is named the Wendy and Avron Fogelman Religious School in honor of Fogelman and his wife.

In 2004, Fogelman was named "Tennessean of the Year" by the Tennessee Sports Hall of Fame.

The FedExPark Avron Fogelman Field was named after him in 2021 after a $1.5 million donation.

== Philanthropy ==
In 2019, Fogelman donated his vast sports memorabilia collection, worth more than $10 million, to Florida Atlantic University (FAU). At the time, his gift marked the fifth-largest one-time donation to the university. The collection's 1,200 items are on display in The Avron B. Fogelman Sports Museum at FAU's Schmidt Family Complex for Academic and Athletic Excellence on the Boca Raton campus.

Highlights of The Avron B. Fogelman Sports Museum collection include:

- The 13 original rules of basketball by James Naismith
- Babe Ruth’s pinstripe uniform pants worn on his first day as a New York Yankee in 1921
- Joe DiMaggio’s 1936 rookie uniform
- Roger Maris’ uniform worn in 1961 when he broke the single season home run record
- Hank Aaron’s uniform worn in 1974 when he broke the career home run record
- 1985 Kansas City Royals World Series Trophy
- Final cleats worn by football great Jim Thorpe
- Football signed by the undefeated 1972 Miami Dolphins
- The 1969 Ryder Cup Trophy
- Baseballs signed by sports legends, entertainers, politicians and historical figures
