= Tennessee State Route 277 =

State highway in Tennessee, United States

State Route 277

Route information
- Maintained by TDOT
- Length: 3.17 mi (5.10 km)
- Existed: July 1, 1983–present

Major junctions
- South end: US 78 (Lamar Avenue)
- US 70 / US 79 / US 64 / SR 23 (Union Avenue)
- North end: US 70 / US 79 / US 64 (Summer Avenue) / SR 1 (North Parkway) / SR 57 (N Trezevant Street)

Location
- Country: United States
- State: Tennessee
- Counties: Shelby

Highway system
- Tennessee State Routes; Interstate; US; State
← SR 276	→ SR 278

State Route 277 (SR 277), also known as Airways Boulevard and East Parkway, is a major north–south urban state highway in Memphis, Tennessee, United States.

== Route description ==
SR 277 begins as a signed secondary highway at an intersection with Lamar Avenue (US 78/SR 4) and Airways Boulevard in the Orange Mound community and continues north as Airways. It intersects the Memphis Parkway System and turns into East Parkway. Continuing north it crosses under Union Avenue (US 70/US 79/US 64/SR 23) and picks up the former three routes, where it becomes an unsigned primary highway. Local expressway Sam Cooper Boulevard terminates along SR 277 just south of the state route's northern terminus at North Parkway (SR 1)/Summer Avenue. The U.S. Routes continue east along Summer.

The state designation is not generally referred to by locals; SR 277 is generally referred to solely by the street names. The Airways Boulevard section is a four-lane undivided urban street with a 35-mile-per-hour (56 km/h) speed limit. The majority of the East Parkway section is a six-lane divided major urban arterial with a wide, treed median (except under the Union Avenue overpass). It carries a 40-mile-per-hour (64 km/h) speed limit.

== Major intersections ==
The entire route is in Memphis, Shelby County.

mi	km	Destinations	Notes
0.0	0.0	US 78 (Lamar Avenue/SR 4) Airways Boulevard to I-240 – Memphis International Airport	Southern terminus; roadway continues south as Airways Boulevard; SR 277 begins as a signed secondary highway
0.64	1.03	South Parkway, Spottswood Avenue	SR 277 joins the Memphis Parkway System and becomes East Parkway
1.88– 2.06	3.03– 3.32	US 64 west / US 70 west / US 79 south (Union Avenue/SR 23 west) SR 23 east (Union Avenue)	Southern end of US 64/US 70/US 79 concurrency; interchange; SR 277 becomes an unsigned primary highway
2.44	3.93	US 72 east / SR 57 east (Poplar Avenue)	Southern end of SR 57 concurrency; western terminus of US 72
3.00	4.83	Sam Cooper Boulevard east to I-40 / I-240 – Nashville	Western terminus of Sam Cooper Boulevard
3.17	5.10	US 64 east / US 70 east / US 79 north (Summer Avenue/SR 1 east) SR 1 west (North Parkway) SR 57 west (North Trezevant Street)	Northern terminus; SR 277 ends as an unsigned primary highway
1.000 mi = 1.609 km; 1.000 km = 0.621 mi: Concurrency terminus; Route transition
