= U.S. Route 70 in Tennessee =

Highway Tennessee, United States

U.S. Route 70
- Route of US 70 in Tennessee highlighted in red

Route information
- Maintained by TDOT
- Length: 478.48 mi (770.04 km)
- Existed: 1926–present
- Tourist routes: East Tennessee Crossing Byway

Major junctions
- West end: I-55 / US 61 / US 64 / US 70 / US 78 / US 79 at the Arkansas state line (Mississippi River) in Memphis
- I-55 in Memphis; US 70A / US 79 in Brownsville; I-40 near Jackson; I-40 / I-65 in Nashville; US 231 in Lebanon; US 127 in Crossville; US 321 in Lenoir City; US 11 in Dixie Lee Junction; I-40 / US 25W in Knoxville; US 25 / US 25E in Newport
- East end: US 25 / US 70 at the North Carolina state line in Cocke County

Location
- Country: United States
- State: Tennessee
- Counties: Shelby, Fayette, Tipton, Haywood, Madison, Carroll, Benton, Humphreys, Dickson, Cheatham, Davidson, Wilson, DeKalb, White, Cumberland, Roane, Loudon, Knox, Sevier, Jefferson, Cocke

Highway system
- United States Numbered Highway System; List; Special; Divided; Tennessee State Routes; Interstate; US; State
← SR 69A	→ US 70N

U.S. Route 70 (US 70) enters the state of Tennessee from Arkansas via the Memphis & Arkansas Bridge in Memphis, and runs west to east across 21 counties in all three Grand Divisions of Tennessee, with a total length of 478.48 miles (770.04 km), to end at the North Carolina state line in eastern Cocke County. Along the route, US 70 is accompanied with various U.S. and state highways, including those in three of the state's four major cities (e.g. Memphis, Nashville, and Knoxville). US 70 is the longest US Highway in Tennessee, and the state's second-longest numbered highway, behind State Route 1 (SR 1), which it shares concurrencies with for much of its length. US 70 was the main highway across Tennessee before Interstate 40 (I-40), which it roughly parallels.

== Route description ==
=== Memphis to Nashville ===
US 70 enters the state via the Memphis & Arkansas Bridge on I-55, along with U.S. Routes 61, 64, and 79, along with SR 1. US 70 follows E.H. Crump Avenue, Danny Thomas Boulevard, Union Avenue, East Parkway, and Summer Avenue through Memphis, mostly accompanied with US 64 and US 79, along with some of SR 3.

While US 64 departs from US 70/79 in Bartlett, US 79 remains with US 70 from there to Brownsville, in Haywood County. US 70 turns eastward to go through the cities of Jackson, Huntingdon, and Camden before crossing the Tennessee River. After that, it then continues eastward through Waverly, Dickson, and Kingston Springs before making entry into Nashville.

Much of US 70 from Memphis to the west side of Nashville is accompanied by the secret designation of Tennessee State Route 1, with the exception of a few streets in downtown Memphis. US 70 has two concurrencies with SR 1 in the western half of the state, one in the downtown area, and the other from the east side of Memphis to western Davidson County. The brief one in downtown Nashville is the third SR 1 concurrency along with US 70S/US 431 along Broadway.

=== Nashville area ===
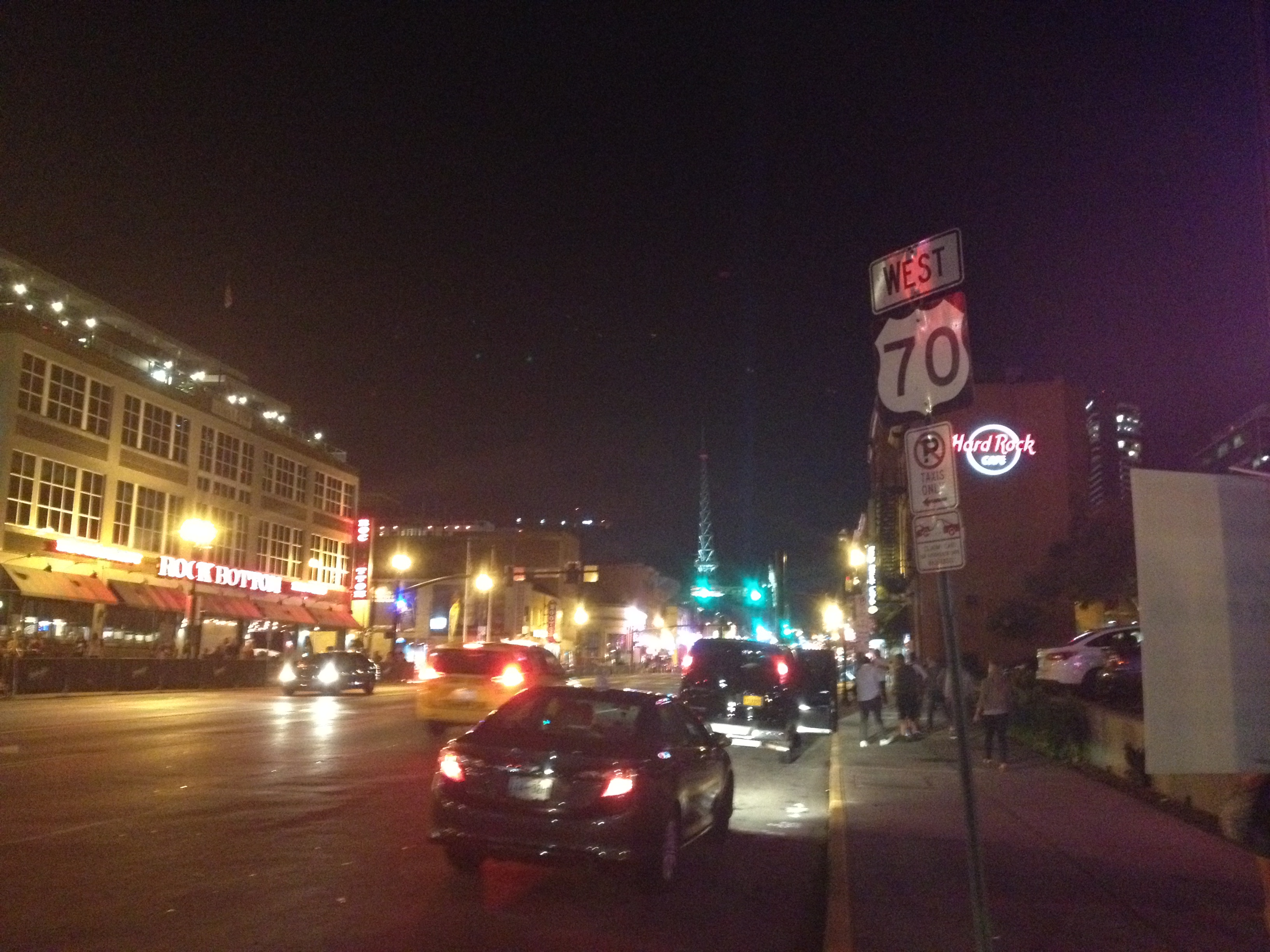
US 70 westbound along Broadway in Nashville at night

In Nashville, US 70 begins to be paired with SR 24 after lending SR 1 to the Memphis-Bristol Highway (U.S. Route 70S). US 70 continues into downtown Nashville, following Charlotte Avenue, 14th Avenue (13th Avenue for US 70's westbound lanes along I-40/I-65), Broadway, First Avenue, and Hermitage Avenue. At the 14th Avenue intersection on Charlotte Avenue, US 70 acts as collector/distributor roads for I-40/I-65 for two blocks before joining U.S. 431 and U.S. 70S on a brief overlap.

After US 431 and US 70S splits from the main route on Broadway, US 70 progresses eastward, roughly paralleling the Cumberland River, ducking under the western split of I-40 and I-24, and continuing to an interchange with SR 155 (Briley Parkway) east of downtown, and then Old Hickory Boulevard in Hermitage.

=== Mount Juliet to Lenoir City ===
East of Nashville, US 70 enters Wilson County near Mount Juliet. US 70 then bypasses the downtown area of Lebanon with intersections with US 231 (SR 10) and US 70N (SR 24), and including a concurrency with SR 141 before turning southeast to DeKalb and White Counties. US 70 is paired with Tennessee State Route 26 from Lebanon all the way to the state route's terminus in Sparta. Near the US 70S junction in Sparta, SR 1 returns to US 70 for its route from there, to Crossville, to the Harriman/Kingston area, all the way into the north side of Lenoir City, and after US 11 (SR 2) joins US 70, it eventually enters the Knoxville area.

=== Knoxville to the North Carolina border ===
In downtown Knoxville, US 70, along with US 11, follows Neyland Drive, south of the campus of University of Tennessee, then exits onto Hall of Fame Drive north to Magnolia Avenue. US 11/70 follows Magnolia Avenue out of downtown. At the US 11W/11E split, US 70 begins to follow US 11E, while SR 1 follows US 11W. Before crossing the Tennessee River for a second time, US 25W begins to follow US 70 (SR 9) from the east side of Knoxville until it merges with US 25E at Newport. US 70 carries US 25 into North Carolina east of Newport.

== Major intersections ==
The mileposts listed in the following table is only an estimated calculation. Actual mile markers may vary.

County	Location	mi	km	Destinations	Notes
Mississippi River		0.00	0.00	I-55 north / US 61 north / US 64 west / US 70 west / US 78 west / US 79 south SR 1 begins	Continuation into Arkansas; western terminus of SR 1
Mississippi River		0.00	0.00	Memphis & Arkansas Bridge	
Shelby	Memphis	0.6	0.97	I-55 south – Jackson (MS)	I-55 exit 12, end concurrency with I-55
Shelby	Memphis	1.3	2.1	US 61 south (S Third Street/SR 14 south) – Tunica SR 4 east (Crump Boulevard) to I-240 / US 78	Western terminus of SR 4; eastern end of US 61 concurrency; western end of unsigned SR 14 concurrency
Shelby	Memphis	2.2	3.5	US 78 east (Doctor M.L.K. Jr Avenue/SR 278 east)	Eastern end of US 78 and unsigned SR 278 overlap
Shelby	Memphis	2.6	4.2	SR 3 north / SR 14 north (N B.B. King Boulevard/N 2nd Street)	Western end of unsigned SR 3 concurrency; eastern end of unsigned SR 14 concurrency; follows one-way pair
Shelby	Memphis	3.0	4.8	US 51 north / SR 1 east (Danny Thomas Boulevard)	Western end of US 51 concurrency; End first concurrency with unsigned SR 1
Shelby	Memphis	4.2	6.8	I-240 south – Jackson, MS	No direct access to north(west)bound I-240 nor from south(east)bound I-240 (both signed at Madison Avenue); I-240 exit 30
Shelby	Memphis	4.4	7.1	US 51 south (S Bellevue Boulevard/SR 3 south)	Eastern end of US 51 and unsigned SR 3 concurrency; western terminus of unsigned SR 23; western end of SR 23 concurrency
Shelby	Memphis	6.6	10.6	SR 23 east (Union Avenue) / SR 277 south (East Parkway)	Western end of unsigned SR 277 concurrency; eastern end of unsigned SR 23 concurrency
Shelby	Memphis	7.1	11.4	US 72 east / SR 57 east (Poplar Avenue)	Western end of wrong-way SR 57 concurrency; western terminus of US 72
Shelby	Memphis	7.7	12.4	Sam Cooper Boulevard east to I-40 / I-240 – Nashville	Western terminus of Sam Cooper Boulevard
Shelby	Memphis	7.8	12.6	SR 1 west (North Parkway) / SR 57 west (N Trezevant Street)	Northern terminus of unsigned SR 277; eastern end of wrong-way SR 57 concurrency; Western end of SR 1 concurrency #2
Shelby	Memphis	13.3	21.4	I-40 west to I-240 west – Little Rock, Jackson, MS	No access to I-40 Eastbound; I-40 exit 12A
Shelby	Memphis	13.6– 13.8	21.9– 22.2	Bridge over the Wolf River	
Shelby	Bartlett	17.9	28.8	US 64 east / SR 15 (Stage Road) – Memphis, Bolivar	Eastern end of US 64 concurrency
Shelby	Memphis	21.2	34.1	SR 177 south (Germantown Road) to I-40	Northern terminus of SR 177
Shelby	Memphis	30.2– 30.5	48.6– 49.1	SR 385 (Paul Barrett Memorial Parkway) to I-40 / I-269 – Millington, Collierville, Tunica, MS	Interchange; Future I-269
Shelby	Arlington	31.1	50.1	SR 205 south (Airline Road)	Western end of SR 205 concurrency
Shelby	Arlington	31.9	51.3	SR 205 north (Collierville-Arlington Road) – Collierville	Eastern end of SR 205 concurrency
Shelby	Arlington	33.5– 33.6	53.9– 54.1	Bridge over the Loosahatchie River	
Fayette	Gallaway	35.6	57.3	SR 196 south (Main Street) – Hickory Withe, Piperton	Northern terminus of SR 196
Fayette	Braden	39.7	63.9	SR 59 south – Somerville	Western end of SR 59 concurrency
Tipton	Mason	42.7	68.7	SR 59 north (Main Street) – Covington	Eastern end of SR 59 concurrency
Haywood	Stanton	50.8	81.8	SR 222 south (Stanton-Somerville Road)	Northern terminus of SR 222
Haywood	Stanton	50.9	81.9	SR 179 (Charleston Road) to I-40 (West Main Street) – Covington	
Haywood		55.9– 56.0	90.0– 90.1	Judge John B. Bond Memorial Bridge over the Hatchie River	
Haywood	Brownsville	61.6	99.1	SR 19 west (Ah Gray/CA Rawls Bypass)	Western end of SR 19 concurrency; Old US 79/70 straight ahead
Haywood	Brownsville	64.1	103.2	SR 76 south (Anderson Avenue) – Somerville	Western end of SR 76 concurrency
Haywood	Brownsville	64.9	104.4	SR 19 east (East Jefferson Street)	Eastern end of SR 19 concurrency
Haywood	Brownsville	65.4	105.3	US 70A east / US 79 north (North Dupree Avenue/SR 76) – Bells	Northern end of US 79 concurrency; Western terminus of US 70A
Haywood	Brownsville	73.6– 73.8	118.4– 118.8	I-40 – Memphis, Nashville	I-40 Exit 66
Madison		75.9	122.1	SR 138 (Providence Road)	
Madison	Jackson	84.1	135.3	SR 223 (Smith Lane) to I-40	Provides access to McKellar-Sipes Regional Airport
Madison	Jackson	88.1– 88.2	141.8– 141.9	Bridge over the South Fork of the Forked Deer River	
Madison	Jackson	88.8	142.9	US 45 Byp. north (Keith Short Bypass/SR 186) to I-40 – Humboldt	Western end of US 45 Bypass (SR 186) concurrency
Madison	Jackson	90.3	145.3	US 45 south (Highland Avenue/SR 5) – Selmer	Southern terminus of US 45 Bypass (SR 186); eastern end of US 45 Bypass (SR 186) concurrency
Madison	Jackson	91.2	146.8	SR 198 east (Chester Street)	Western terminus of SR 198
Madison	Jackson	93.2	150.0	Whitehall Street / Dr. Fe Wright Drive	US 70/SR 1 -- right turn
Madison	Jackson	94.1	151.4	US 412 Bus. west (North Parkway/SR 20)	Southern end of US 412 Business/SR 20 concurency
Madison	Jackson	96.9	155.9	US 412 east (SR 20) – Lexington	Northern end of US 412 Bus./SR 20 concurrency; Eastern terminus of US 412 Business; Southern end of US 412 concurrency
Madison	Jackson	97.2– 97.3	156.4– 156.6	I-40 / US 412 west – Memphis, Nashville	Northern end of US 412 concurrency
Madison	Spring Creek	104.2	167.7	SR 152 west (Spring Creek Road) – Medina	Western end of 75 ft. concurrency with SR 152
Madison	Spring Creek	104.25	167.77	SR 152 east (Spring Creek Road)	Eastern end of 75 ft. concurrency with SR 152
Carroll	Cedar Grove	110.3	177.5	SR 104 east to I-40 – Lexington	Southern end of SR 104 concurrency
Carroll	Cedar Grove	110.8	178.3	SR 220 north – Atwood	Southern terminus of SR 220
Carroll		113.5	182.7	SR 104 west – Milan	Northern end of SR 104 concurrency
Carroll		114.2	183.8	SR 424 east – Clarksburg	Western terminus of SR 424
Carroll	Huntingdon	125.8	202.5	SR 22 north (Veterans Drive) / US 70 Bus. east / SR 1 east (Main Street)	Western end of SR 22 concurrency
Carroll	Huntingdon	127.2	204.7	SR 22 Bus. north (Lexington Street)	Southern terminus of SR 22 Business
Carroll	Huntingdon	127.4	205.0	SR 22 south – Lexington	Eastern end of SR 22 concurrency; interchange
Carroll	Huntingdon	129.4	208.2	US 70 Bus. west / US 70A (SR 364)	Eastern terminus of US 70A; interchange
Carroll	Rosser	132.0	212.4	SR 219 north (Rosser Road) – Paris	Southern terminus of SR 219
Carroll	Hollow Rock	136.4	219.5	SR 114 south	Western end of SR 114 concurrency
Carroll	Hollow Rock	136.7	220.0	SR 114 north (Seminary Street)	Eastern end of SR 114 concurrency
Carroll	Bruceton	139.3	224.2	Bridge over the Big Sandy River	
Benton	Camden	144.4	232.4	US 70 Bus. east (W Main Street/SR 391) – Camden Business District, Nathan Bedford Forrest State Park	Western terminus of US 70 Business
Benton	Camden	146.0	235.0	US 641 (SR 69) – Camden, Parsons	
Benton	Camden	147.8	237.9	SR 191 (Birdsong Road)	
Benton	Camden	148.7	239.3	US 70 Bus. (Forest Avenue S/SR 391) – Camden	Eastern terminus of US 70 Business
Kentucky Lake		152.8 153.3	245.9 246.7	Hickman Lockhart Bridge over the Tennessee River	
Humphreys	New Johnsonville	155.3	249.9	County Road 929 -- TVA Johnsonville	Interchange
Humphreys		158.1	254.4	Old Johnsonville Road -- Johnsonville State Historic Park	
Humphreys	Waverly	163.5	263.1	West Main Street to SR 13 -- downtown Waverly	Old US 70/SR 1
Humphreys	Waverly	166.3	267.6	SR 13 spur to SR 13	Northern terminus of SR 13 Spur
Humphreys	Waverly	167.2	269.1	East Main Street	Old US 70/SR 1
Humphreys	McEwen	175.5	282.4	SR 231 north (County Road 341)	Southern terminus of SR 231
Dickson	Dickson	188.7	303.7	SR 46 north / SR 235 north (Pond Road) – Vanleer	Western end of SR 46/235 concurrency
Dickson	Dickson	188.8	303.8	US 70 Bus. east (West College Street/SR 235 south)	Western terminus of US 70 Business; Eastern end of SR 235 concurrency
Dickson	Dickson	189.9– 190.1	305.6– 305.9	SR 48 (North Main Street) – Charlotte, Centerville	Interchange
Dickson	Dickson	190.4	306.4	SR 46 south (Mathis Drive) to I-40 – Bon Aqua	Eastern end of SR 46 concurrency
Dickson	Dickson	190.9	307.2	US 70 Bus. west (E College Street/SR 235 north)	Eastern terminus of US 70 Business; southern terminus of SR 235
Dickson	Dickson	192.5	309.8	SR 96 east to I-40 – Burns, Franklin	Western terminus of SR 96
Dickson	White Bluff	198.8	319.9	SR 47 south – Montgomery Bell State Park, Burns	Western end of SR 47 concurrency
Dickson	White Bluff	199.3	320.7	SR 47 north (Charles Walton Speight Highway) – Charlotte	Eastern end of SR 47 concurrency
Cheatham	Kingston Springs	207.3	333.6	Joe A. Taylor Memorial Bridge over the Harpeth River	
Cheatham	Kingston Springs	207.4	333.8	Cedar Hill Road - Mound Bottom, Narrows of the Harpeth River State Park	
Cheatham	Pegram	209.7	337.5	SR 249 south (Kingston Springs Road) to I-40 – Kingston Springs	Western end of SR 249 concurrency
Cheatham	Pegram	209.9	337.8	SR 249 north (Sams Creek Road) – Ashland City	Eastern end of SR 249 concurrency
Davidson	Nashville	215.4	346.7	US 70S east / SR 1 east (Highway 70 S) – Bellevue	Western termini of US 70S and SR 24; eastern end of SR 1 concurrency; western end of SR 24 concurrency
Davidson	Nashville	219.1	352.6	SR 251 (Old Hickory Boulevard) to I-40 – Ashland City, Bellevue	
Davidson	Nashville	220.8– 221.1	355.3– 355.8	I-40 – Memphis, Nashville	I-40 Exit 201
Davidson	Nashville	223.6	359.8	SR 155 (White Bridge Road/Briley Parkway) to I-40	Beltway around Nashville
Davidson	Nashville	223.8	360.2	Bridge over Richland Creek	
Davidson	Nashville	227.3	365.8	I-40 west / I-65 north – Memphis, Louisville	US 70/SR 24 gets divided between 14th and 13th Avenues serving as local-express lanes; I-40 Exits 209 and 209A; I-40 west accessible via 13th Avenue only
Davidson	Nashville	227.7	366.4	US 70S west / US 431 south / SR 1 west (Broadway) to I-40 east / I-65 south – Knoxville, Huntsville	US 70/SR 24 division ends; Western end of US 70S/431/SR 1 concurrency; On-ramp to I-40 EB/I-65 SB accessed via 14th Avenue South
Davidson	Nashville	227.72	366.48	US 70 west / SR 24 west (13th Avenue North) to I-40 west / I-65 north	I-40 WB/I-65 NB accessed via 13th Avenue North
Davidson	Nashville	228.1	367.1	US 31 / US 41 / US 41A / US 70S east / US 431 north / SR 1 east (8th Avenue/SR 6/SR 11)	Eastern end of US 70S/431/SR 1 concurrency
Davidson	Nashville	230.6	371.1	Bridge over Mill Creek	
Davidson	Nashville	233.9– 234.1	376.4– 376.7	SR 155 (Briley Parkway) to I-40	SR 155/Briley Parkway Exit 8
Davidson	Donelson	235.5	379.0	SR 255 south (Donelson Pike) to I-40	Northern terminus of SR 255; provides access to Nashville International Airport
Davidson	Hermitage	237.7– 237.8	382.5– 382.7	Elmer Disspayne Sr. Memorial Bridge over the Stones River	
Davidson	Hermitage	238.0	383.0	SR 265 east (Central Pike)	Western terminus of SR 265
Davidson	Hermitage	239.0	384.6	SR 45 (Old Hickory Boulevard) to I-40 – Old Hickory, Madison	
Wilson	Mount Juliet	245.7	395.4	SR 171 south (Mount Juliet Road) to I-40 – Antioch	Northern terminus of SR 171
Wilson		250.5	403.1	SR 109 to I-40 – Gallatin	Interchange
Wilson	Lebanon	256.1	412.2	US 70 Bus. east (W Main Street/SR 24 east) – Downtown Lebanon	Eastern end of unsigned SR 24 concurrency; Western terminus of US 70 Bus and unsigned SR 26
Wilson	Lebanon	258.8	416.5	US 231 (North Cumberland Street/SR 10) – Westmoreland, Murfreesboro	
Wilson	Lebanon	259.6	417.8	SR 266 south (N College Street)	Northern terminus of SR 266
Wilson	Lebanon	260.0	418.4	SR 141 north (Hartsville Pike) – Hartsville	Western end of SR 141 concurrency
Wilson	Lebanon	260.5	419.2	US 70N east / US 70 Bus. west (E Main Street/SR 24) – Carthage, Lebanon Business District	Eastern terminus of US 70 Bus; Western terminus of US 70N
Wilson	Lebanon	260.54	419.30	SR 141 east (Trousdale Ferry Pike) – Gordonsville	Eastern end of SR 141 concurrency
Wilson	Lebanon	262.04– 262.2	421.71– 422.0	I-40 – Nashville, Knoxville	I-40 Exit 239A-B eastbound and 239 westbound
Wilson		268.7	432.4	SR 265 west (Trammel Lane) to I-840 – Hermitage	Eastern terminus of SR 265; provides access to Cedars of Lebanon State Park
Wilson	Watertown	272.8	439.0	SR 267 south (Statesville Road) – Statesville	Northern terminus of SR 267
DeKalb	Alexandria	279.6	450.0	SR 53 north (Brush Creek Road) – Gordonsville	Western end of SR 53 concurrency
DeKalb		283.5	456.2	SR 96 west – Auburntown, Murfreesboro	Western end of SR 96 concurrency
DeKalb	Liberty	284.9	458.5	SR 53 south (Woodbury Highway) – Woodbury	Eastern end of SR 53 concurrency
DeKalb	Liberty	285.8	460.0	Bridge over Smith Fork Creek	
DeKalb		290.3	467.2	SR 96 east (Dale Ridge Road) – Center Hill Dam	Eastern end of SR 96 concurrency
DeKalb	Smithville	293.1	471.7	SR 83 (New Home Road/Allen Ferry Road)	Partial loop around Smithville
DeKalb	Smithville	295.7	475.9	SR 146 south (South Mountain Street)	Northern terminus of SR 146
DeKalb	Smithville	296.0	476.4	SR 56 (Congress Boulevard) – Baxter, McMinnville	
DeKalb		302.9– 302.3	487.5– 486.5	Bridge over Center Hill Lake/Caney Fork River	
White		310.8	500.2	SR 136 (Old Kentucky Road) – Cookeville, Rock Island	Provides access to Rock Island State Park
White	Sparta	315.9– 316.1	508.4– 508.7	US 70S west / SR 111 – Cookeville, McMinnville, Spencer	Eastern terminus of US 70S; interchange
White	Sparta	316.6	509.5	SR 1 west (Mayberry Street) to US 70S – McMinnville	Western end of SR 1 concurrency #4; Eastern terminus of SR 26
White	Sparta	316.7	509.7	SR 289 north (North Spring Street)	Old SR 111; southern terminus of SR 289
White	Sparta	317.1	510.3	Bridge over the Calfkiller River	
White	Sparta	317.4	510.8	SR 84 north (North Main Street) – Monterey	Southern terminus of SR 84
Cumberland	Pleasant Hill	336.4	541.4	Bridge over the Caney Fork River	
Cumberland	Crossville	339.9	547.0	Airport Way - Crossville Memorial Airport	
Cumberland	Crossville	341.4	549.4	SR 462 east (Northside Drive)	Western terminus of SR 462
Cumberland	Crossville	342.8	551.7	Bridge over the Obed River	
Cumberland	Crossville	343.3	552.5	US 70N (West Avenue/Elmore Road/SR 24) to US 127 – Monterey	
Cumberland	Crossville	343.7	553.1	SR 392 (Miller Avenue)	Partial beltway around downtown Crossville
Cumberland	Crossville	344.7	554.7	SR 101 south (Lantana Road) – Lake Tansi Village	Western end of SR 101 concurrency
Cumberland	Crossville	344.75	554.82	US 127 (South Main Street/SR 28) – Pikeville, Jamestown	
Cumberland	Crossville	347.2	558.8	SR 392 north (Miller Avenue) / SR 101 north (Peavine Road) – Fairfield Glade	Northern end of SR 101 concurrency; southern terminus of SR 392
Cumberland	Crab Orchard	354.8	571.0	Market Street to I-40 - Justin P. Wilson Cumberland Trail State Park	I-40 Exit 329
Cumberland		357.4	575.2	Renegade Mountain Parkway - Renegade Mountain	
Cumberland	Ozone	359.3	578.2	Ozone Falls State Natural Area Trailhead	
Cumberland	Westel	364.1	586.0	SR 299 north (Westel Road) to I-40	Southern terminus of SR 299
Roane	Rockwood	367.4	591.3	US 27 south (South Gateway Avenue/SR 29) – Spring City	Southern end of US 27/SR 29 concurrency
Roane	Rockwood	370.2	595.8	US 27 north / SR 61 east (North Gateway Avenue) – Harriman	Northern end of US 27 concurrency; western terminus of SR 61
Roane		373.6	601.3	SR 382 north (Patton Lane)	Southern terminus of SR 382; provides access to Roane State Community College
Roane	Midtown	377.2	607.0	SR 29 north (Pine Ridge Road) to I-40 – Harriman	Northern end of SR 29 concurrency
Roane	Kingston	378.4– 378.6	609.0– 609.3	Thomas W. Pickel Jr. Memorial Bridge over Watts Bar Lake/Clinch River	
Roane	Kingston	381.3	613.6	SR 58 (Kentucky Street) – Decatur, Oak Ridge	
Roane	Kingston	385.2	619.9	SR 326 north (Gallaher Road) to I-40 – Oak Ridge	Southern terminus of SR 326
Loudon	Lenoir City	395.8	637.0	US 321 (SR 73/SR 95) to I-40 / I-75 – Oak Ridge, Maryville	
Loudon	Dixie Lee Junction	399.9	643.6	US 11 south (Lee Highway/SR 2 west) – Lenoir City	Western end of US 11 concurrency; eastern terminus of SR 2
Knox	Farragut	404.5	651.0	SR 332 east (S Campbell Station Road)	Western terminus of SR 332
Knox	Farragut	405.6	652.7	SR 131 north (Lovell Road)	Southern terminus of SR 131
Knox	Knoxville	406.7– 406.9	654.5– 654.8	I-140 (Pellissippi Parkway) – Maryville, Oak Ridge	I-140 exit 1 A/B eastbound; exit 1 westbound
Knox	Knoxville	413.8	665.9	SR 332 (Northshore Drive)	
Knox	Knoxville	417.2	671.4	Kingston Pike to Cumberland Avenue - Downtown Knoxville	Former route of US 11/US 70/SR 1 through downtown Knoxville; western end of now unsigned SR 158 (Neyland Drive) concurrency
Knox	Knoxville	417.3– 417.4	671.6– 671.7	US 129 (Alcoa Highway/SR 115) to I-40 / I-75 – Alcoa, Maryville	Interchange
Knox	Knoxville	417.9	672.5	SR 450 east (Joe Johnson Drive) – University of Tennessee	Western terminus of SR 450
Knox	Knoxville	419.1	674.5	Lake Loudon Boulevard - University of Tennessee, Thompson-Boling Arena, Neyland Stadium	
Knox	Knoxville	419.5	675.1	Walnut Street - Knoxville Civic Coliseum, William Blount Mansion, James White Fort	Intersection with exit to Tennessee Riverboat Landing
Knox	Knoxville	419.6	675.3	Volunteer Landing	Eastbound exit only
Knox	Knoxville	419.7– 420.1	675.4– 676.1	SR 158 east (James White Parkway) to I-40	Eastbound exit and westbound entrance; eastern end of now unsigned SR 158 concurrency
Knox	Knoxville	420.1	676.1	SR 71 south (James White Parkway)	Western end of unsigned SR 71 concurrency; interchange; follows Hall Of Fame Drive
Knox	Knoxville	420.4	676.6	W Church Avenue - Knoxville Civic Coliseum, Downtown	
Knox	Knoxville	420.8	677.2	Summit Hill Drive - Downtown	To US 441 / SR 62
Knox	Knoxville	421.2	677.9	East 5th Avenue - Downtown; Hall of Fame Drive (SR 71 north)	East 5th Avenue is the former route of US 11/US 70/SR 1; eastern end of unsigned SR 71 concurrency; follows Magnolia Avenue
Knox	Knoxville	423.5	681.6	US 11W north / SR 1 east (Rutledge Pike) / US 11E begins	Eastern end of SR 1 concurrency; US 11 splits into US 11E and US 11W; western end of US 11E and unsigned SR 168 concurrency; eastern terminus of unsigned SR 168
Knox	Knoxville	425.5– 425.6	684.8– 684.9	I-40 / US 25W north (SR 9 north) – Knoxville, Asheville	Western end of US 25W/SR 9 concurrency
Knox	Knoxville	426.2– 426.4	685.9– 686.2	Bridge over the Holston River	
Knox	Knoxville	426.5	686.4	SR 168 west (Governor John Sevier Highway) – South Knoxville	Eastern end of SR 168 concurrency
Knox	Carter	431.6	694.6	US 11E north (Andrew Johnson Highway/SR 34 east) – Strawberry Plains, New Market, Jefferson City	Eastern end of US 11E concurrency; western terminus of SR 34
Sevier		438.2	705.2	SR 139 south (Douglas Dam Road) – Kodak	Western end of SR 139 concurrency
Jefferson	Four Points	439.7	707.6	SR 139 north (Old Dandridge Pike / Snyder Road) – Strawberry Plains	Eastern end of SR 139 concurrency; Snyder Road is old SR 66
Jefferson	Dandridge	447.4– 447.6	720.0– 720.3	I-40 / SR 66 south – Knoxville, Asheville	Western end of SR 66 concurrency; I-40 exit 415
Jefferson	Dandridge	450.7	725.3	SR 92 north – Jefferson City	Western end of SR 92 concurrency
Jefferson	Dandridge	451.3	726.3	SR 92 south (Gay Street) – Chestnut Hill	Eastern end of SR 92 concurrency
Jefferson	Dandridge	452.1	727.6	SR 66 north (Valley Home Road) – Morristown	Eastern end of SR 66 concurrency
Jefferson	Dandridge	455.7	733.4	SR 113 north to I-40 – White Pine	Southern terminus of SR 113
Jefferson		455.9– 456.3	733.7– 734.3	Bridge over Douglas Lake/French Broad River	
Jefferson	Reidtown	461.5	742.7	SR 363 west (Indian Creek Road)	Eastern terminus of SR 363
Cocke		462.5	744.3	US 411 south (SR 35 south) – Sevierville	Western end of unsigned SR 35 concurrency; northern terminus of US 411
Cocke		463.2– 463.5	745.4– 745.9	I-40 – Knoxville, Asheville	I-40 exit 432A-B
Cocke	Newport	465.9	749.8	US 25E north (Dixie Highway/SR 32 north) – White Pine, Morristown	Southern termini of US 25W and US 25E; western end of unsigned SR 32 concurrency; US 70 continues with US 25
Cocke	Newport	467.0	751.6	US 321 south / SR 32 south (Cosby Highway) – Cosby, Gatlinburg	Eastern end of SR 32 concurrency; Western end of US 321 concurrency
Cocke	Newport	467.3	752.0	US 321 north (North Street/SR 35 north) – Greeneville	Eastern end of US 321 and SR 35 concurrency
Cocke	Newport	468.2	753.5	John W. Fisher Bridge over the Pigeon River	
Cocke	Newport	468.3	753.7	SR 73 south (Wilton Springs Road) – Cosby	Northern terminus of SR 73
Cocke		471.7– 472.0	759.1– 759.6	Major J.T. Huff Bridge over the French Broad River	
Cocke		475.9	765.9	SR 340 north (Baltimore Road) – Parrottsville	Southern terminus of SR 340
Cocke	Del Rio	478.5	770.1	SR 107 west	Western end of SR 107 concurrency
Cocke		481.7	775.2	SR 107 east – Greeneville	Eastern end of SR 107 concurrency
Cocke	Cherokee National Forest	482.8– 482.9	777.0– 777.2	Wolf Creek Bridge over the French Broad River	
Madison	Cherokee National Forest	486.1	782.3	US 25 south / US 70 east (NW Hwy 25-70) – Hot Springs	Continuation into North Carolina; end concurrency with unsigned SR 9
1.000 mi = 1.609 km; 1.000 km = 0.621 mi: Concurrency terminus; Incomplete access; Route transition

== Related routes ==
=== Supplemental routes ===
- U.S. Route 70 Business (Huntingdon, Tennessee)
- U.S. Route 70 Business (Camden, Tennessee)
  - Tennessee State Route 391
- U.S. Route 70 Business (Dickson, Tennessee)
  - Tennessee State Route 235
- U.S. Route 70 Business (Lebanon, Tennessee)

=== Tennessee State Route 26 ===
State Route 26
- Location: Lebanon--Sparta
- Length: 59.25 mi (95.35 km)

State Route 26 (SR 26) runs concurrently with US 70 for its entire existence through Wilson, De Kalb and White Counties in Middle Tennessee. The 59.25 miles (95.35 km) long state highway runs from Lebanon downtown Sparta.

=== History ===
It was signed solely as SR 26 until sometime in the 1960s or 1970s when US 70 was designated on that alignment, but retains the state route designation as a secret, or hidden designation.

== See also ==
- Roads in Memphis, Tennessee
- Roads in Nashville, Tennessee
- Tennessee State Route 1
- Tennessee State Route 9
- Tennessee State Route 24
- Tennessee State Route 76

U.S. Route 70
Previous state: Arkansas	Tennessee	Next state: North Carolina
