= Tennessee State Route 138 =

Highway in Tennessee

State Route 138
- SR 138 highlighted in red

Route information
- Maintained by TDOT
- Length: 23.01 mi (37.03 km)

Major junctions
- South end: SR 18 near Toone
- SR 100 in Toone; US 70 in rural western Madison County
- North end: I-40 in rural western Madison County

Location
- Country: United States
- State: Tennessee
- Counties: Hardeman, Madison

Highway system
- Tennessee State Routes; Interstate; US; State
← SR 137	→ SR 139

State Route 138 (SR 138) is a 23.01-mile-long (37.03 km) state highway in West Tennessee, connecting the town of Toone with Interstate 40 (I-40).

== Route description ==
SR 138 begins in Hardeman County at an intersection with SR 18. It goes northwest through wooded areas to enter Toone, where it passes through town along Main Street before having an intersection with SR 100. The highway then leaves Toone and continues northwest through mostly wooded areas to cross into Madison County. SR 138 continues north through farmland to have an intersection with SR 223 before passing Mercer. It continues north through farmland and rural areas for several miles to an intersection with US 70/SR 1 before coming to an end at an interchange with I-40 (Exit 68), where the road continues north as Providence Road. The entire route of SR 138 is a rural two-lane highway.

== Major intersections ==
County	Location	mi	km	Destinations	Notes
Hardeman		0.0	0.0	SR 18 – Bolivar, Medon	Southern terminus
Hardeman	Toone	3.3	5.3	SR 100 – Whiteville, Henderson	
Madison		12.7	20.4	SR 223 north (Shady Grove Road) – Denmark, Jackson	Southern terminus of SR 223
Madison		22.1	35.6	US 70 (Brownsville Highway/SR 1) – Brownsville, Jackson	
Madison		23.01	37.03	I-40 – Memphis, Nashville	I-40 exit 68; northern terminus; road continues north as Providence Road
1.000 mi = 1.609 km; 1.000 km = 0.621 mi
