= Mercer, Tennessee =

- Unincorporated community
- Location within Tennessee Location within the United States
- Coordinates: 35°28′45″N 89°02′32″W
- Country: United States
- State: Tennessee
- County: Madison

Area
  - Total: 1.74 sq mi (4.51 km^{2})
  - Land: 1.74 sq mi (4.51 km^{2})
  - Water: 0 sq mi (0.00 km^{2})
- Elevation: 351 ft (107 m)

Population (2020)
  - Total: 150
  - Density: 86.1/sq mi (33.26/km^{2})
- Time zone: UTC-6 (Central (CST))
  - Summer (DST): UTC-5 (CDT)
- ZIP code: 38392
- Area code: 731
- GNIS feature ID: 1293606

Mercer is an unincorporated community in Madison County, Tennessee, United States. It is located along State Route 138 halfway between Interstate 40 and Toone, just east of the Hatchie River. Mercer has a post office; its zip code is 38392.

== Demographics ==
Historical population
Census	Pop.	Note	%±
2020	150		—
U.S. Decennial Census

== History ==
Mercer was founded in 1888 by T. B. Mercer, for whom the community is named, at an intersection of a stagecoach road and the Tennessee Midland Railroad. Mercer erected a general store at the intersection, and it was followed in 1894 by a railroad station officially named Mercer. By the turn of the century, a lumber company and several churches had been established in the area. The community eventually had a bank and an opera house, but the former failed in 1933 and the latter burned down in the late 20th century.
