= Tennessee State Route 23 =

State highway in Tennessee, United States

State Route 23
- Union Avenue, Walnut Grove Road
- SR 23 highlighted in red

Route information
- Maintained by TDOT
- Length: 8.83 mi (14.21 km)
- Existed: October 1, 1923–present

Major junctions
- West end: US 51 / US 64 / US 70 / US 79 in Memphis
- SR 277 in Memphis; US 72 / SR 57 in Memphis
- East end: I-240 Exit 13 near Shelby Farms

Location
- Country: United States
- State: Tennessee
- Counties: Shelby

Highway system
- Tennessee State Routes; Interstate; US; State
← US 23	→ I-24

State Route 23 (SR 23) is an east–west major arterial urban highway running from U.S. Route 51 (US 51; Bellevue Boulevard) near downtown Memphis to Interstate 240 (I-240) near Shelby Farms in Shelby County, Tennessee.

== Route description ==
SR 23 is a mix between a four-lane divided highway and a seven-lane urban highway (with center turn lane). This highway is designated on maps as being a secondary state route from its eastern terminus to its junction with SR 277 (East Parkway). At this junction, SR 23 becomes a primary state route all the way to its western terminus at US 51. SR 23 is better known as Union Avenue from its junction with SR 57 (Poplar Avenue) to its western terminus with US 51. Union Avenue continues beyond this terminus, going toward downtown Memphis ending at Riverside Drive. SR 23 from Poplar Avenue to I-240 is known as Walnut Grove Road. According to data from TDOT, The SR 23 designation ends at I-240, however, Walnut Grove Road actually continues east through Shelby Farms.

== History ==
In 2008, Walnut Grove Road was widened from the interchange with I-240 to the Wolf River bridge. The project, which included a new Single Point Urban Interchange with Humphreys Boulevard, was scheduled to be completed before December 1, 2008, but was finished eight months early. The improvements will be continued east of this project through Shelby Farms, including a connection to a proposed extension of Kirby-Whitten Parkway (aka Shelby Farms Parkway). This is expected to begin within the next year or so.

== Major intersections ==
The entire route is in Memphis, Shelby County.

mi	km	Destinations	Notes
		US 64 west / US 70 west / US 79 south / US 51 (Union Avenue/S. Bellevue Boulevard/SR 3)	Western terminus of SR 23; western end of US 64/US 70/US 79 concurrency
		US 64 east / US 70 east / US 79 north / SR 277 (East Parkway)	Interchange; eastern end of US 64/US 70/US 79 concurrency
		Union Avenue Extension	Interchange; eastbound exit and westbound entrance
		Flicker Street	Interchange; eastbound exit and westbound entrance
		US 72 / SR 57 (Poplar Avenue)	Interchange; eastbound exit and westbound entrance; Union Avenue changes to Walnut Grove Road
		I-240 – Nashville, Jackson, MS	Eastern terminus of SR 23; road continues as Walnut Grove Road
1.000 mi = 1.609 km; 1.000 km = 0.621 mi: Concurrency terminus; Incomplete access
