= Sam Cooper Boulevard =

Urban freeway/parkway in Memphis, Tennessee, United States

- Maintained by: City of Memphis and TDOT
- Length: 6.01 mi (9.67 km)
- West end: US 64 / US 70 / US 79 / SR 277 in Memphis
- East end: I-40 / I-240 in Memphis

Construction
- Completed: May 15, 1972 (freeway); July 25, 2002 (parkway extension)

Sam Cooper Boulevard is an east–west urban highway in Memphis, Tennessee, that runs for 6.01 miles (9.67 km). The western segment of the road follows a parkway design, with at-grade intersections, traffic lights, and sidewalks, while the older eastern portion, which was originally constructed as a segment of Interstate 40 (I-40), is a controlled-access highway. The western terminus of Sam Cooper Boulevard is at East Parkway North, which is composed of U.S. Route 64 (US 64), US 70, US 79, and State Route 277 (SR 277). The road's eastern terminus is at a four-level stack interchange with I-40 and I-240. As a road that is owned and maintained by the city of Memphis, no route number is assigned to Sam Cooper Boulevard.

The highway was originally planned in the 1950s as part of the Interstate Highway System. It was proposed as a segment of I-40 that would have passed through the center of Memphis and continue west into Arkansas. The route would have cut through Overton Park, a public park immediately west of the present-day western terminus of Sam Cooper Boulevard. The route plan drew immediate controversy and public opposition, and in 1957 an organization called Citizens to Preserve Overton Park was established to fight the highway. In 1971, the U.S. Supreme Court ruled in Citizens to Preserve Overton Park v. Volpe that the segment of I-40 through the park was not eligible for federal funds and established the modern process of judicial review of infrastructure projects in the United States. Federal and state transportation officials continued to explore alternative designs through the park before abandoning the plans in 1981. The following year, I-40 was rerouted onto what was initially I-240 around Memphis to the north, and ownership of the completed segments of the highway was transferred to the city of Memphis. In 1986, the highway was named Sam Cooper Boulevard after a local businessman. The parkway portion of the boulevard was completed in 2002 along right-of-way acquired for the cancelled Interstate.

== Route description ==
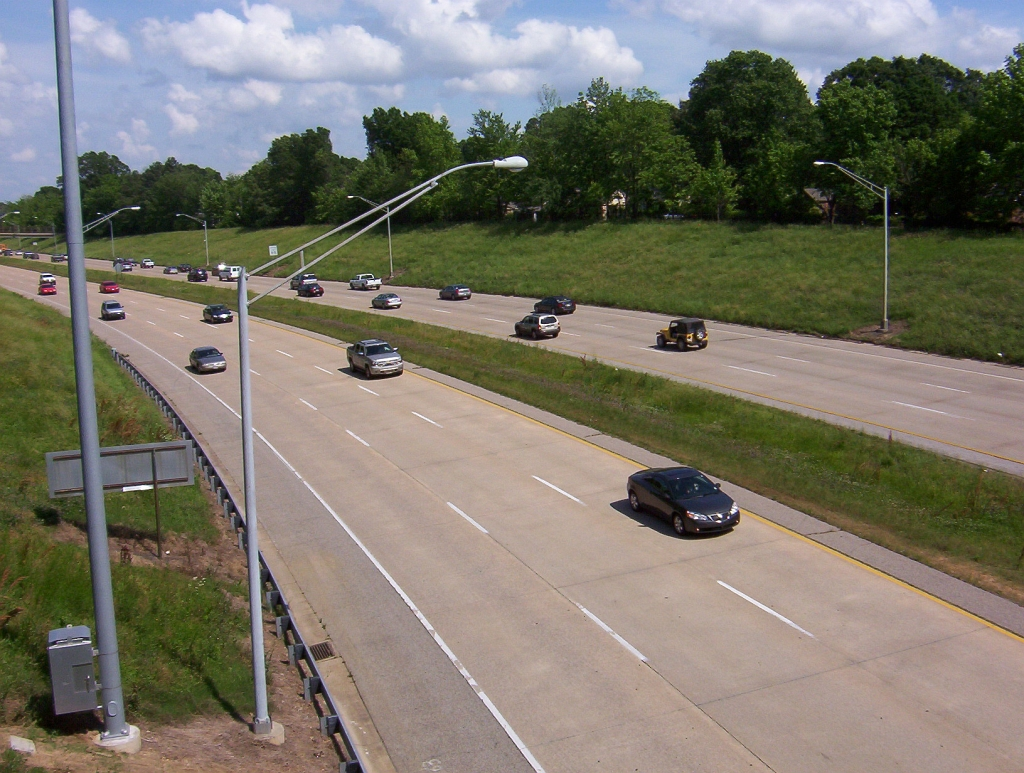
The freeway portion of Sam Cooper Boulevard, originally part of I-40

Sam Cooper Boulevard is predominantly maintained by the public works division of the city of Memphis. The portion at the eastern terminus is maintained by the Tennessee Department of Transportation (TDOT), but Sam Cooper Boulevard is one of the few freeways in Tennessee that is not maintained entirely by TDOT. It has a total length of 6.01 miles (9.67 km). The entire highway is part of the National Highway System, a national network of roads identified as important to the national economy, defense, and mobility. Traffic volumes consistently grow on the boulevard from west to east. In 2025, annual average daily traffic volumes ranged from 28,786 vehicles at the western terminus to 67,422 vehicles at the eastern terminus. The original route from west of North Highland Street is a six-lane controlled-access highway, allowing only motorized traffic. Exits on this section are still numbered as if I-40 ran along Sam Cooper Boulevard as it was originally proposed. The extension of Sam Cooper Boulevard west of the North Highland Street exit is a six-lane limited-access parkway. Pedestrians are allowed on the route on sidewalks installed on both sides of the parkway west of Vandalia Street, located about 1,400 feet (430 m) west of North Highland Street. The median is raised and there are at-grade intersections present equipped with traffic signals and pedestrian crossings.

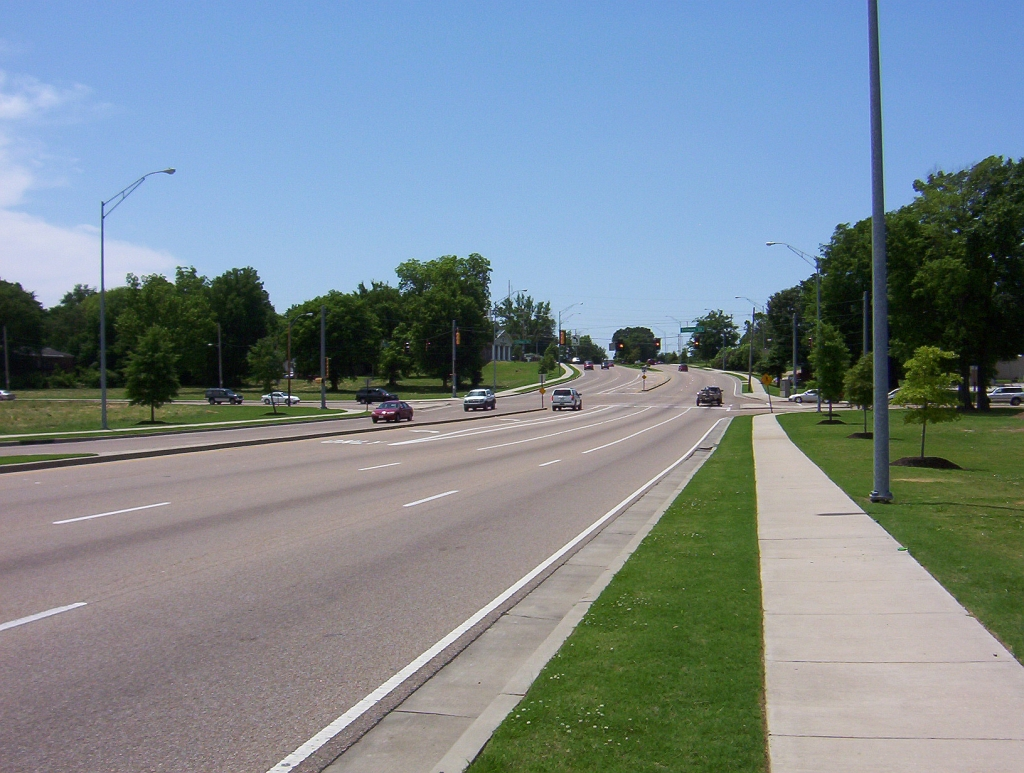
The Tillman Street intersection on the parkway portion of Sam Cooper Boulevard

Sam Cooper Boulevard begins at an at-grade signalized intersection in the Binghampton neighborhood with East Parkway (which is composed of U.S. Routes 64, 70, and 79, and State Route 277 (SR 277)) opposite the western boundary of Overton Park. The road proceeds eastward, and immediately has its first signalized intersection with Hollywood Street. It then intersects Collins Street with a signal before crossing a viaduct over a CSX railroad mainline. The boulevard then has its third and final signalized intersection with Tillman Street. Sam Cooper Boulevard immediately crosses Cypress Creek before becoming a freeway and passing north of Chickasaw Country Club. It then has its first interchange with North Highland Street. Shifting slightly south, the highway has an interchange with Graham Street less than one mile (1.6 km) later. About one mile (1.6 km) beyond this point is an interchange with Perkins Road, where it begins paralleling Shelby Farms Greenline, a multi-use trail, to the north. Sam Cooper Boulevard then shifts into a northeastward alignment and reaches its eastern terminus at a four-level stack interchange with I-40 and the eastern terminus of I-240. At this interchange, the boulevard's lanes seamlessly merge into I-40 from the left, and I-40 turns 90 degrees from a north-south to an east-west trajectory.

== Namesake ==
On December 16, 1986, the road was named after Sam Cooper (1911-1999), a Memphis businessman and longtime president of the Humko Corporation, a refinery of vegetable oils. He also was the vice president of the Federal Reserve Bank of Memphis. Cooper used his wealth to support St. Jude Children's Research Hospital and the University of Tennessee Medical School.

== History ==
=== Proposed I-40 route and initial construction ===
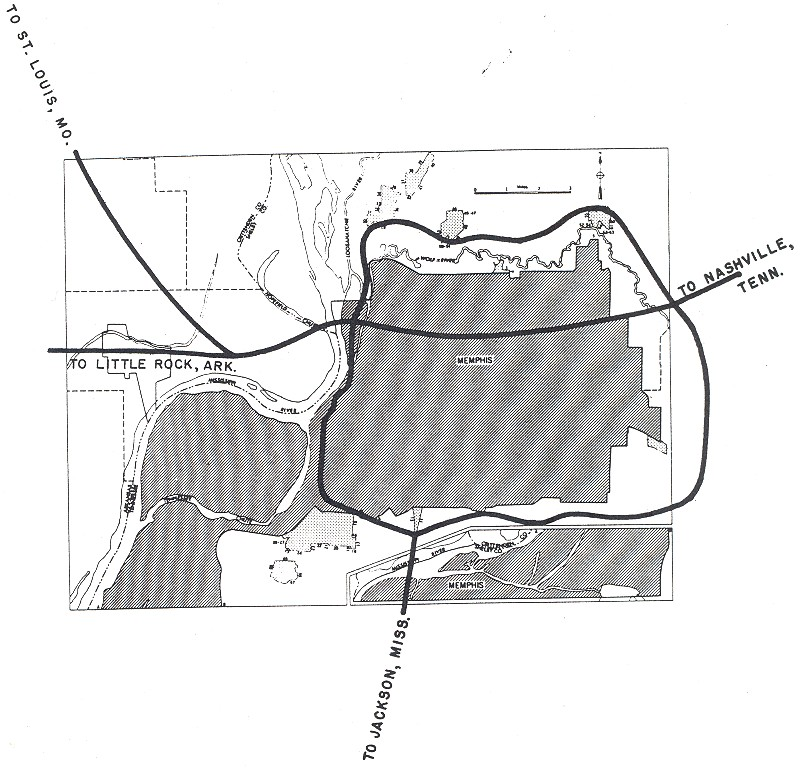
Bureau of Public Roads map of Interstate Highway plan for Memphis in 1955

In the 1950s, local and state officials began planning for a freeway system through Memphis in anticipation of federal authorization for the Interstate Highway System. The city commissioned Harland Bartholomew & Associates, a St. Louis engineering firm, to develop a planning study. Their plan, completed in 1955, called for an east-to-west freeway to pass through Memphis, and intersect a north-south freeway near downtown. This freeway would then continue west across the Mississippi River into Arkansas, and east to Nashville. The city would also be encircled by a circumferential beltway. The loop was planned to route traffic not destined for Memphis around the city and to improve the flow of increasing traffic. It would connect westbound and eastbound traffic to the east-west freeway and southbound and northbound traffic to the north-south freeway. While the federal Bureau of Public Roads (BPR), the predecessor agency to the Federal Highway Administration (FHWA) requested some revisions to this plan, the east-west freeway, was reaffirmed by July 1956, one month after the Interstate system was established by the Federal-Aid Highway Act of 1956. The American Association of State Highway Officials approved numbering the east-west and north-south freeways as I-40 and I-55, respectively, in 1957. and the beltway as I-240 the following year.

What is now known as Sam Cooper Boulevard was planned as a segment of I-40 inside the I-240 beltway, bisecting Memphis and distributing eastbound and westbound traffic with a destination in Memphis within the city. I-40 was planned to continue west of the western terminus of Sam Cooper Boulevard to a present-day interchange with I-240 in midtown Memphis. East of the I-40/I-240 interchange, the proposed route of Sam Cooper Boulevard would have been routed almost due east for circa 1.2 miles (1.9 km), parallel to and south of Overton Park Avenue and north of Peach Avenue until it reached Evergreen Street. From there, it would have continued northeast for about 1/2 mile (800 m) to reach the intersection of Galloway Avenue and North McLean Boulevard. From there, the route would have continued roughly to the east, parallel to and about 0.2 miles (320 m) south of North Parkway, just south of the Memphis Zoo and cutting through the northern portion of Overton Park, to connect to the western terminus of modern Sam Cooper Boulevard at East Parkway North. This routing was approved by the BPR in November 1956. Planners also studied two alternative routes to the north that would have bypasses the park completely, but reportedly did not give these alignments much consideration because they were longer and were projected to be more expensive.

The interchange with I-40/240 at the eastern terminus of Sam Cooper Boulevard was the first part of the highway to be built. On October 9, 1963, the north-south segment of freeway through this interchange, which now consists of I-40 to the north and I-240 to the south, was dedicated by Tennessee Governor Frank G. Clement. It opened to traffic 14 days later. On December 14, 1964, Clement dedicated and opened the section of I-40 east of this interchange and the portion of what is now Sam Cooper Boulevard through this interchange. Initially, a temporary access to the interchange was provided via White Station Road immediately to the west. A contract for the 1.7-mile (2.7 km) segment between Waring Road and White Station Road was let on May 29, 1969, and construction began in July. The connecting 2.1 miles (3.4 km) extending west to Broad Avenue west of the Highland Street interchange was contracted in July 1969 and construction began the following month. The two segments, totaling 3.7 miles (6.0 km), opened on May 15, 1972. At its western end, Sam Cooper Boulevard initially transitioned into Broad Avenue between North Holmes Street and Vandalia Street, about 0.4 miles (640 m) west of North Highland Street.

=== Public opposition and litigation ===
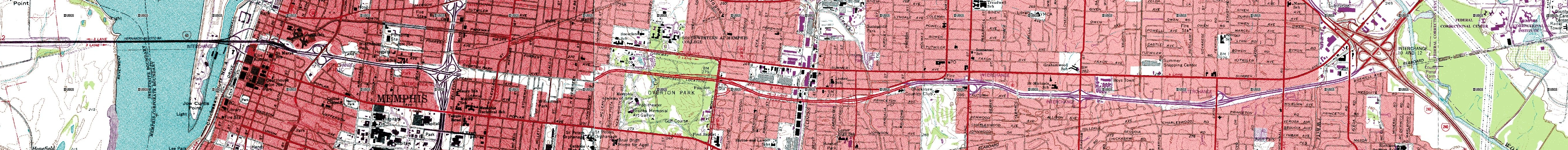
Original proposed route of I-40 through Memphis

The planned routing of I-40 through Overton Park immediately drew the ire of preservationists who sought to preserve and protect the park and its resources. The park consists of a wooded refuge, the Memphis Zoo, the Memphis Brooks Museum of Art, the Memphis College of Art, a nine-hole golf course, an amphitheater which was the site of Elvis Presley's first paid concert in 1954, and other amenities. When state officials announced that I-40 would pass through the park, a group of local citizens spearheaded by a group of older women called "little old ladies in tennis shoes" by media outlets began a campaign to halt construction. The organizers started by collecting over 10,000 signatures, and founded Citizens to Preserve Overton Park (CPOP) in 1957. Their movement was also backed by environmentalists, who feared that the Interstate's construction would upset the park's ecological balance; the wooded area had become an important stopover for migratory birds. However, the Tennessee Department of Highways, the predecessor agency to TDOT, did not immediately start working on this section, and instead focused on completing other Interstate sections in Memphis first. In March 1961, public hearings for the section were met with protest. Shortly thereafter, then-Memphis Mayor Henry Loeb reported that the city had urged an alternative route that avoided disturbing the park be approved, but that engineers claimed such an alignment was "impossible".

In March 1964, the Tennessee Department of Highways hired Buchart Horn to begin designed the segment of I-40 inside the I-240 loop, and the controversy resurfaced. Then-Mayor William B. Ingram and several city commissioners preferred the Interstate not pass thorugh Overton Park, but several of them reportedly believed that every effort had already been made to avoid the park. In late July, highway commissioner David M. Pack told CPOP members that he would once again consider alternative routes, but reported two months later that the route was unlikely to change. By mid-November, BPR officials met with CPOP members and discussed reducing the road's impact on the park. In July 1965, Commissioner Pack announced the interchange with North Parkway would be redesigned to remove most of its footprint in the park. That fall, local businessman Abe Plough threatened to withdraw a promised donation of $1 million (equivalent to $7.78 million in 2025) to renovate the zoo if the design required visitors to cross a pedestrian bridge across the freeway between the zoo and parking area. That December, he met with Mayor Ingram and Governor Clement and proposed relocating the Interstate to the park's northern border and the zoo south into the central part of the park. On January 17, 1966, BPR administrator Rex Marion Whitton informed Pack that the BPR's decision reaffirmed their previous plans, but that the design would ensure future preservation of the park. Shortly thereafter, Plough withdrew his financial support. The BPR announced its preliminary approval of the park route on March 15, 1967, and the city commission voted to accept it on May 2, 1967. The BPR authorized the state to begin acquiring right-of-way for the approaches in late May 1967, and the controversy became heated once again. On April 4, 1968, reportedly minutes before the assassination of Martin Luther King Jr. in Memphis, the new city council approved a resolution echoing the engineers' finding that the park route was the most "feasible and prudent" alignment.

Historic marker at the Tennessee Welcome Center on I-40 in Memphis commemorating Citizens to Preserve Overton Park v. Volpe

In 1969 the BPR proposed a depressed route through the park as a compromise, and held public hearings on May 19 of that year. Two months later, Secretary of the Interior Wally Hickel urged that the Interstate be tunneled under the park. In September 1969, the state completed right-of-way acquisition through the park, paying $2 million (equivalent to $13.4 million in 2025) for the land and $206,000 (equivalent to $1.39 million in 2025) to the Memphis Park Commission to replace park facilities that would have been destroyed by the Interstate. On November 5, 1969, John A. Volpe, the U.S. Secretary of Transportation, approved the design, authorized federal funding for the project, and cleared the way for the state to solicit bids. On December 10, 1969, Citizens to Preserve Overton Park filed a lawsuit in the US District Court for the Western District of Tennessee, challenging Volpe's assessment that the section through the park was eligible for federal funding in accordance with federal laws. The suit was dismissed on February 26, 1970, by Judge Bailey Brown, which was subsequently upheld by the Sixth Circuit Court of Appeals on September 29, 1970. The case was then appealed to the US Supreme Court, which reversed the lower-court rulings in the landmark decision of Citizens to Preserve Overton Park v. Volpe on March 2, 1971. The court ruled that by authorizing funding and bid-letting for this segment of I-40, Volpe had violated clauses of the Department of Transportation Act of 1966 and the Federal-Aid Highway Act of 1968, which using federal funding for highway projects through public parks with feasible alternative routes. The court determined that feasible alternative routes around the park did exist, including ones the state had rejected as being too costly. This landmark case also established the modern process of judicial review of infrastructure projects in the United States.

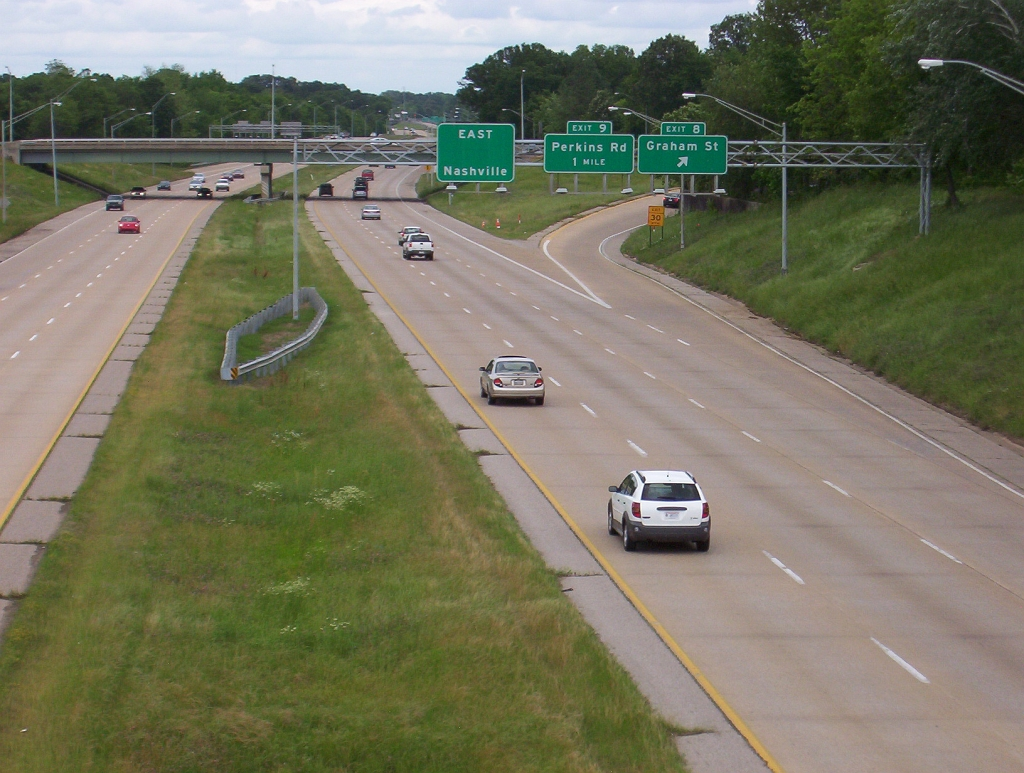
Exit 8 at Graham Street, with blank signs where I-40 was originally posted

State officials continued exploring options to route I-40 through Overton Park for many years after the Supreme Court ruling, including tunneling under the park or constructing the highway below grade, but ultimately concluded that the alternatives were too expensive. On January 9, 1981, Governor Lamar Alexander submitted a request to Secretary of Transportation Neil Goldschmidt to cancel the route through Overton Park, which was approved seven days later. On June 28, 1982, the American Association of State Highway and Transportation Officials approved an application by TDOT to redesignate the northern portion of I-240 as the remainder of I-40. this added about 3.4 miles (5.5 km) to the route. The completed portion of I-40 between the park and the loop was then turned over to the city of Memphis. In late 1986, federal and state officials agreed to return the right-of-way through the park back to the city of Memphis. Right-of-way was also acquired west of the park, and many structures were demolished to make way for the Interstate; some of these empty lots have since been built on. Overhead gantry signs above the westbound lanes and directional signs at the onramps were still labeled for Little Rock, Arkansas, until the lettering was removed in March 2016. The blank signs, along with a sign denoting the highway's former terminus west of Highland Street, were removed in 2024 as part of a project to replace signs on freeways in Memphis.

=== Later history ===
==== Extension to East Parkway ====
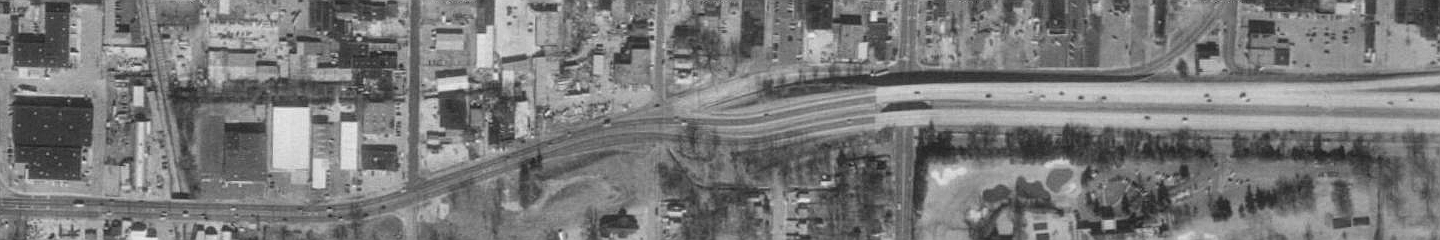
Sam Cooper Blvd. transition into Broad Avenue in 1986, prior to the extension

While the boulevard initially terminated west of North Highland Street, the state had acquired right of way and demolished structures all the way to East Parkway. After I-40 was canceled through Overton Park, about $280 million (equivalent to $838 million in 2025) had been budgeted by the federal government for this project were diverted for other transportation improvements in the Memphis metropolitan area. Local officials proposed using some of these funds to extend Sam Cooper Boulevard as a parkway to relieve congestion on other streets. The route coinciding with Broad Avenue, which served as the main route between Midtown and East Memphis, had several intersections with traffic signals and two major railroad crossings, creating traffic congestion at peak times. Initially, however, these funds were used for other projects.

The contract for the extension was awarded in December 1999, and construction began in February 2000. The construction did not follow the originally proposed freeway design for the road but implemented a parkway design with at-grade intersections, a raised median, traffic lights and sidewalks for pedestrians. The extension of Sam Cooper Boulevard was routed about 300 to 400 feet (91–122 m) south of Broad Avenue. Several of the intersections were eliminated, a viaduct was constructed to avoid the railroad crossings, and the route was extended to East Parkway North. The extension opened to traffic on July 25, 2002, and final work was completed three months later.

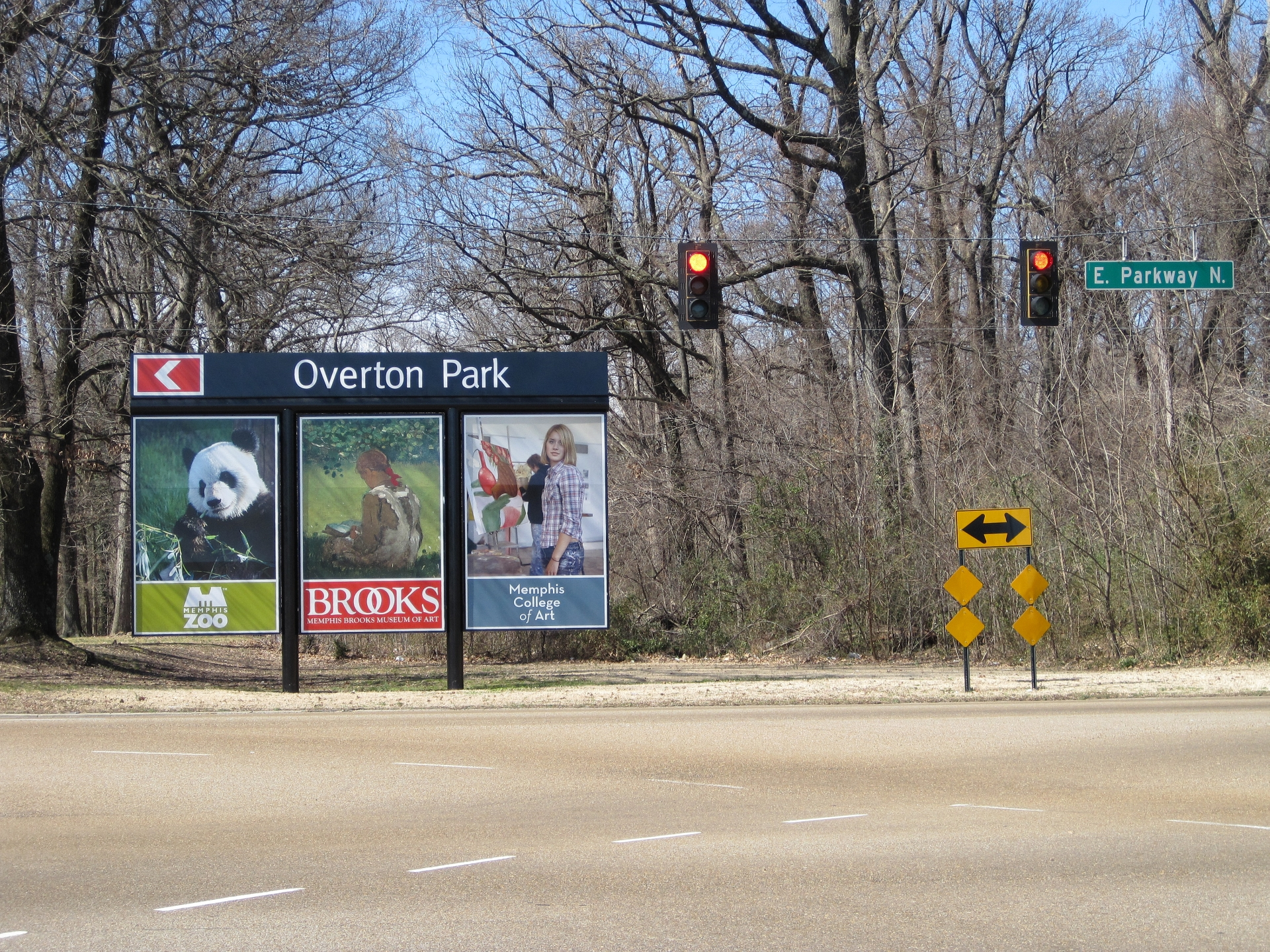
Western terminus of Sam Cooper Boulevard with Overton Park in the background

In 2006, citizens from the Binghampton neighborhood voiced concerns about negative effects that the completion of the western portion had on the community. Claims were made that the road cut the Binghampton area in half by creating "high-speed traffic" and "confusing traffic patterns". Accusations were levied that the routing of Sam Cooper Boulevard to the south of Broad Avenue had induced deterioration along the roughly 1.4-mile-long (2.3 km) stretch of Broad Avenue, creating vacant lots in the partly industrial area and an unsafe neighborhood. Citizens suggested changes in the zoning and a re-design of the Broad Avenue area north of Sam Cooper Boulevard and south of Summer Avenue to re-vitalize that part of the neighborhood and attract new businesses and residents. The following year, trees and shrubs were planted alongside Sam Cooper Boulevard and in the median west of North Highland Street. A few decorative flowerbeds were also installed in the median of the road to enhance the parkway design.

==== I-40/240 interchange reconstruction ====
The cancellation of the section of I-40 through Overton Park rendered interchange with I-40 and I-240 at the eastern terminus of Sam Cooper Boulevard inadequate to handle the unplanned traffic patterns, necessitating its reconstruction; it also contained ramps with hazardously sharp curves. It was reconstructed with two projects. The first, which began in January 2001 and finished in October 2003, constructed a two-lane overpass from I-40 westbound to I-240 westbound; this replaced a one-lane loop ramp and widened the approach of I-240 south of the interchange. I-40 north of the interchange was also reconstructed in preparation for the second project.

The second project, initially scheduled to begin in January 2004, was delayed until October 2013 due to funding and redesign complications. A two-lane overpass was built to carry I-40 eastbound traffic through the interchange, replacing a one-lane ramp. The single-lane ramp carrying I-40 westbound traffic through the interchange was repurposed, and was replaced with a two-lane flyover connecting to the flyover constructed in the first project. This project also added a through lane in each direction to Sam Cooper Boulevard through the interchange, widened the ramp connecting I-240 eastbound and I-40 eastbound, widened both approaches to the interchange on I-40 widened the approach on I-240 south of the interchange, and another adjacent interchange on I-40. It cost $109.3 million (equivalent to $144 million in 2025), the most expensive contract in state history at the time, and was completed on December 15, 2016.

=== Incidents ===
In May 2004, it was reported by local newsmedia that several cars driving on Sam Cooper Boulevard had been shot at randomly in the section west of Tillman Street and east of North Hollywood Street in the Binghampton neighborhood. The Memphis Police Department (MPD) reported 13 shootings between August and October of that year. A spokesman for the MPD stated that only vehicle damage had occurred and that no persons were hurt in the shootings. Police recovered a 9 mm bullet from the front door of one vehicle. A special police task force was assigned to the case.

== Major intersections ==
Exits are numbered according to the mileage of the canceled section of I-40. The entire route is in Memphis, Shelby County.

mi	km	Exit	Destinations	Notes
0.00	0.00		US 64 / US 70 / US 79 (East Parkway North) / SR 277	Western terminus
1.44	2.32	Western end of freeway section		
2.13	3.43	7	Highland Street	
3.08	4.96	8	Graham Street	
4.22	6.79	9	Perkins Road	
5.41– 6.01	8.71– 9.67	10	I-40 west / I-240 west – Little Rock, Jackson, Miss	Eastbound exit and westbound entrance; signed as exits 10A (I-240) and 10B (I-40); exit 12B on I-40; eastern terminus and exit 12B on I-240
5.41– 6.01	8.71– 9.67		I-40 east – Nashville	Eastern terminus; exit 10B on I-40
1.000 mi = 1.609 km; 1.000 km = 0.621 mi: Incomplete access; Unopened
