= Memphis Parkway System =

- Memphis Park and Parkway System
- U.S. National Register of Historic Places
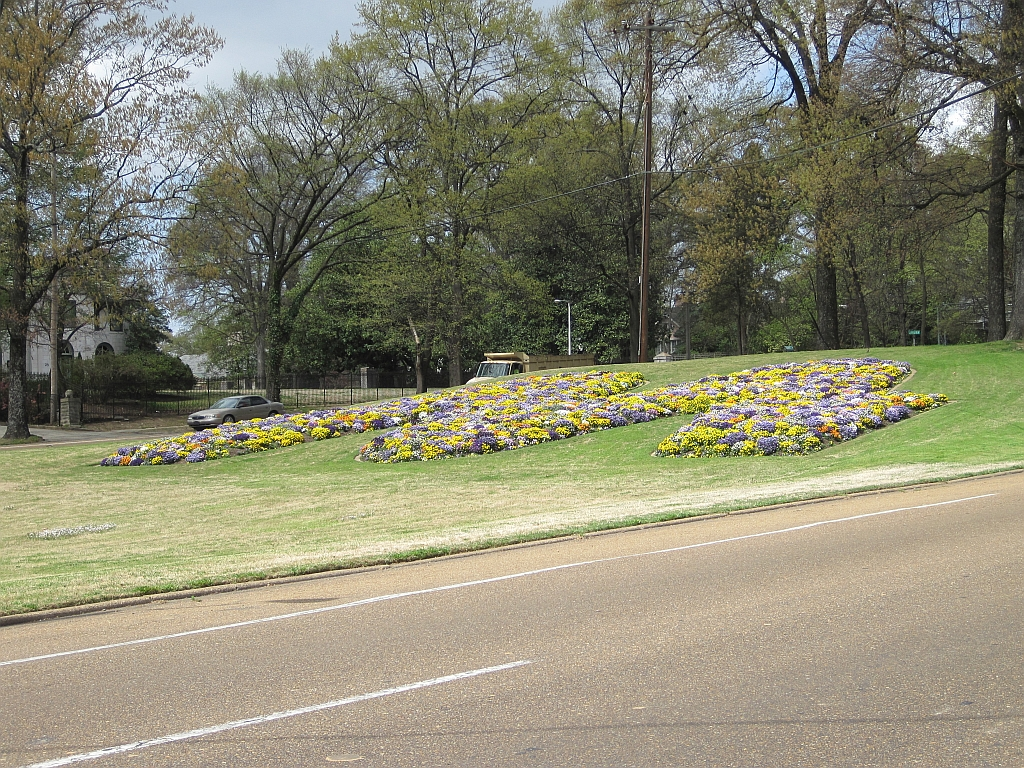
- The Memphis "M" is located on the median of East Parkway at Madison Avenue. Historically, this area was the location of the Sunken Garden in the 1930s.
- Location: Memphis, Tennessee
- Coordinates: 35°8′9″N 89°59′0″W
- Built: 1903
- NRHP reference No.: 89000520
- Added to NRHP: July 3, 1989

The Memphis Parkway System (locally known as the Parkway System, The Parkways, or simply by their individual names) is a system of parkways that formed the original outer beltway around Memphis, Tennessee. They consist of South Parkway, East Parkway, and North Parkway. Designed by George Kessler, the Parkway System connects Martin Luther King Jr. Riverside Park with Overton Park. The system was put on the National Register of Historic Places on July 3, 1989.

== History ==
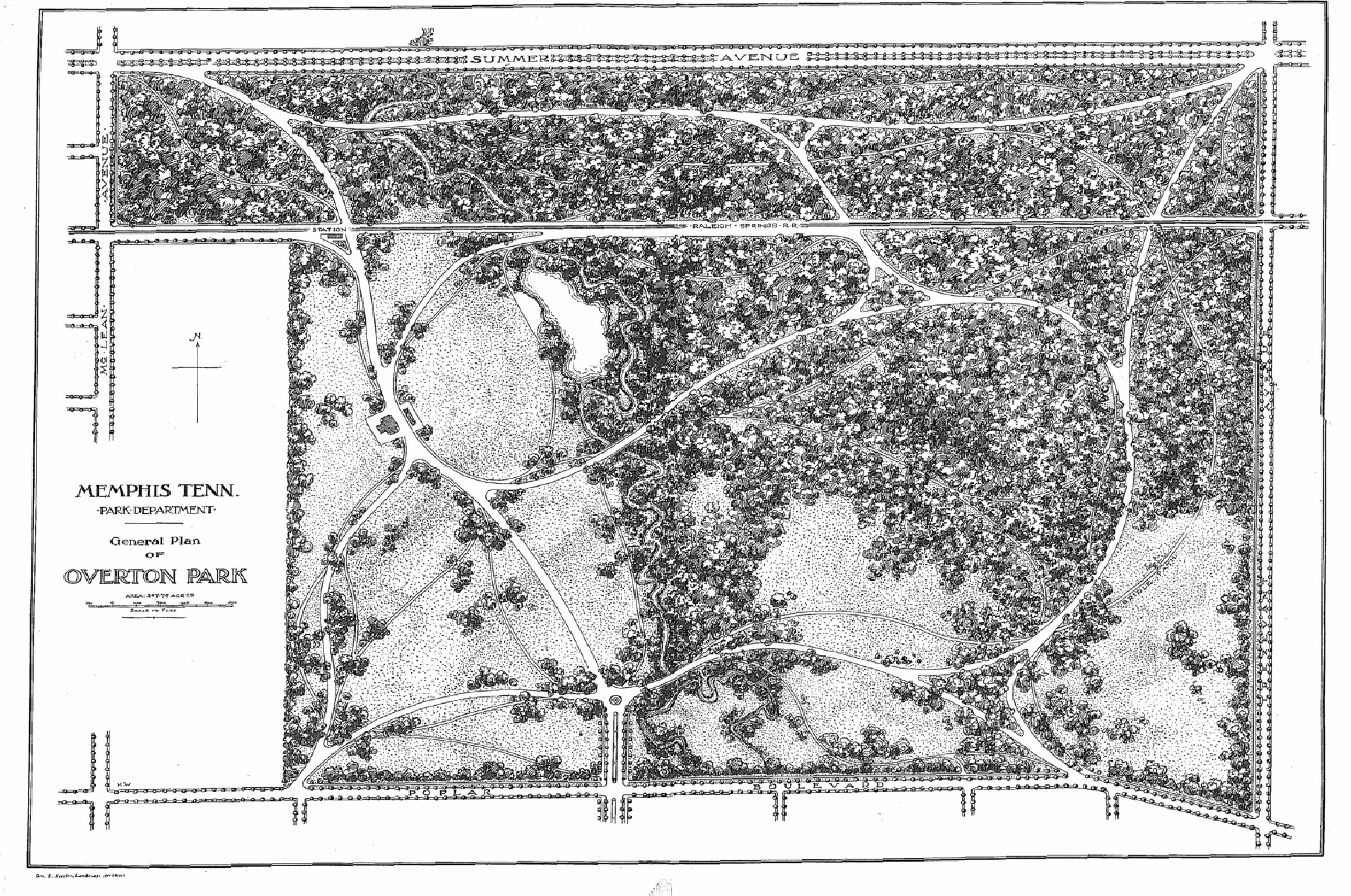
Kessler's plan for Overton Park. North Parkway is to the north (labeled Summer Avenue) and East Parkway is to the east (labeled Trezevant Street).

In response to the yellow fever epidemic and in an attempt to revitalize Memphis, the city's leaders decided to improve the city's infrastructure, including improving sewer systems, creating public utilities, and creating a system of parks connected by a system of boulevards. Starting in 1897, several areas of land were annexed into the city, along with the areas that now comprise the parks mentioned above. These lands were purchased in 1901. In that same year, the city selected George Kessler to lay out this new plan. Planning and construction of the Lea's Woods tract of land (now known as Overton Park) was started in 1902 and completed in the same year. The development and construction of Wilderberger Farm (now known as Martin Luther King Jr. Riverside Park) started in the same year, but finished a year later in 1903.

The development and construction of what is now known as the Parkway System started in 1904. The project had been delayed due to a lawsuit stating the government was using its power of eminent domain incorrectly, but the Tennessee Supreme Court found in favor of the city. Instead of a winding system of meandering parkways, Kessler decided to create a rectangular border around the city of Memphis using some existing streets. South Parkway and East Parkway (originally Trezevant Street) were constructed first. North Parkway was originally known as Summer Avenue (the name still carried by the route as it continues east from the intersection of North and East Parkways). North Parkway was also known as Speedway. Kessler originally designed parts of the Parkway System to be straight portions of tree-lined avenues where car and carriage owners could race against each other. However, the city of Memphis ended this practice in 1910 and imposed a speed limit on the entire system. Today, the road's racing past can still be seen in the name of the Speedway Terrace Historical District along North Parkway near Watkins Street.

The entire parkway system was completed in 1906. After its completion, residential development along its route increased. Many cities in Tennessee used Memphis' park and parkway system as a model for their own urban planning. The Parkway System roughly marked the city's boundaries for many years to come and is still an important corridor in the city of Memphis.

== Route description ==
Moving in a counter-clockwise direction from the southwest corner, the Parkway System starts at Martin Luther King Jr. Riverside Park. It crosses Interstate 55 next to the park and continues east. This portion, known as South Parkway West, is a four-lane undivided road through an industrial area with no boulevard median or landscaping. After crossing Interstate 240/Interstate 69, the section known as South Parkway East becomes divided with a wooded boulevard median, like the majority of the parkways.

South Parkway, after passing U.S. Highway 78 (Lamar Avenue), turns into East Parkway South. Temporarily, the route's name reverts to South Parkway East, as it turns eastbound and intersects with South Cooper St. and East McLemore Avenue. South Parkway East becomes East Parkway South once again at its intersection with Airways Boulevard and Spottswood Avenue. It also picks up the designation of State Route 277. East Parkway South continues north until it crosses under Union Avenue and (two blocks later) becomes East Parkway North. At this point, it picks up U.S. Highway 64, U.S. Highway 70, U.S. Highway 79, and U.S. Highway 72, in addition to keeping the SR 277 designation. When it passes Poplar Avenue, Hwy 72 goes to the east, but it picks up the State Route 57 designation. At this point, it passes to the east of Overton Park and intersects with Sam Cooper Boulevard.

When East Parkway meets North Parkway, it loses all of the above-mentioned U.S. highways to the east (Summer Avenue) and the state highways to the north (Trezevant Street). However North Parkway picks up the State Route 1 designation and is one of the only sections in the state to have this route signed. North Parkway continues west, crosses Interstate 40, and ends at U.S. Highway 51/State Route 3/State Route 14 (Danny Thomas Boulevard). The road continues west as A.W. Willis Avenue, crossing the Wolf River Harbor, and ending on Mud Island.

Except for the South Parkway West section, the entire system is divided by a large median containing several trees, most of them very large and mature, and sections of flowered landscaping. South Parkway has two lanes in each direction and bike/parking lanes along portions of it. East Parkways has three lanes in each direction (except for when the routes pass under other roadways, in which case each direction narrows to two lanes, and the four northbound lanes of East Parkway between Poplar and Sam Cooper). North Parkway had 3 lanes in each direction until the mid-2010s when bike/parking lanes were added between Manassas and West Drive. The entire system has a forty-mile-per-hour speed limit.

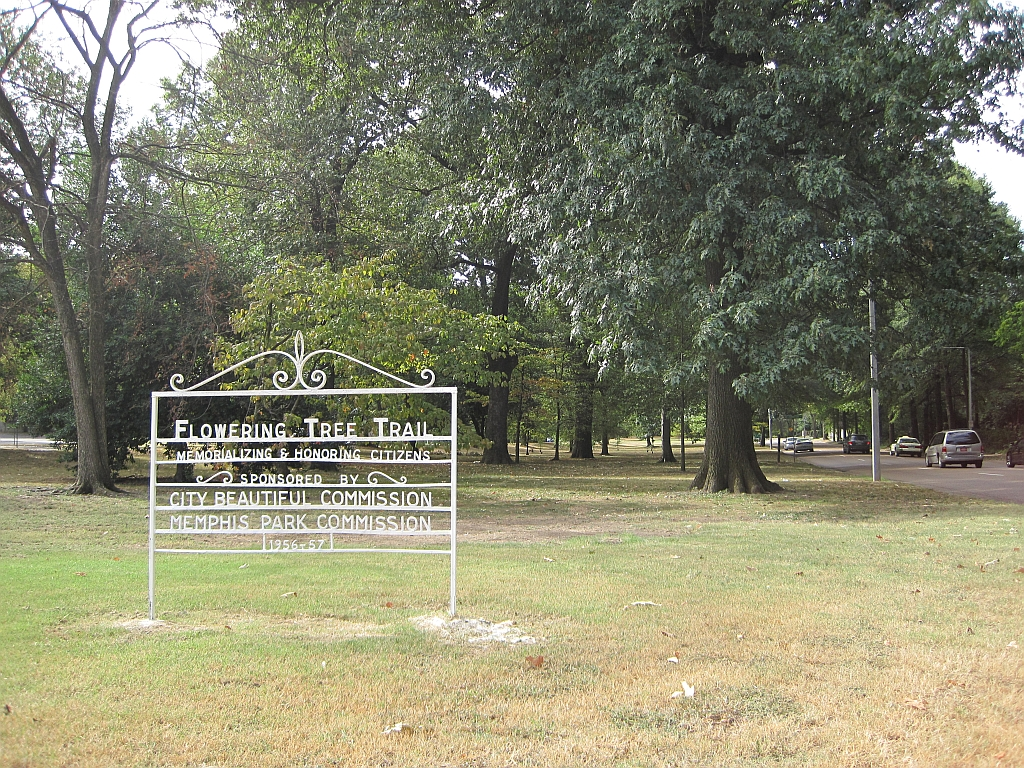
A section of the median of East Parkway was designated "Flowering Tree Trail" in 1956/57.

== Landmarks ==
Below is a list of landmarks within close proximity of the parkways.

South Parkway Section

- President's Island / McKellar Lake
- M.L.K. Riverside Park

East Parkway Section

- Cooper-Young, Memphis
- Christian Brothers University
- Children's Museum of Memphis
- Mid-South Coliseum
- Liberty Bowl Memorial Stadium
- Memphis Theological Seminary
- Memphis Brooks Museum of Art
- Overton Park

North Parkway Section

- Memphis Zoo
- Rhodes College
- St. Jude Children's Research Hospital
- Pyramid Arena
