= Interstate 240 (Tennessee) =

Highway in Tennessee

Interstate 240
- Dr. Martin Luther King Jr. Expressway; W.B. Fowler Sr. Expressway; Avron B. Fogelman Expressway
- I-240 highlighted in red

Route information
- Auxiliary route of I-40
- Maintained by TDOT
- Length: 19.27 mi (31.01 km)
- Existed: November 12, 1958–present
- History: Present-day route completed July 14, 1971; Original route completed March 28, 1980
- NHS: Entire route

Major junctions
- West end: I-40 / SR 14 in Memphis
- US 64 / US 70 / US 79 in Memphis; US 72 in Memphis; SR 385 in Memphis; US 78 in Memphis; I-55 in Memphis
- East end: I-40 / Sam Cooper Boulevard in Memphis

Location
- Country: United States
- State: Tennessee
- Counties: Shelby

Highway system
- Interstate Highway System; Main; Auxiliary; Suffixed; Business; Future; Tennessee State Routes; Interstate; US; State
← SR 239	→ SR 240

Interstate 240 (I-240) is a 19.27-mile-long (31.01 km) auxiliary Interstate Highway in the US state of Tennessee that forms a bypass around the southern and eastern neighborhoods of Memphis. Combined, I-240 and its parent, I-40, form a contiguous beltway around most of Memphis. I-240 runs from I-40 in Midtown Memphis to I-40 and Sam Cooper Boulevard in East Memphis. Throughout its length, it provides access to I-55, multiple U.S. and state routes, and the Memphis International Airport. The segment between the western terminus and I-55 is a north–south route, and the segment between I-55 and the eastern terminus runs east to west. Throughout its length, I-240 is designated as the Dr. Martin Luther King Jr. Expressway, the W.B. Fowler Sr. Expressway, and the Avron B. Fogelman Expressway.

The first sections of I-240 were opened in 1962, and the present-day route was completed in 1971. I-240 was first envisioned in the 1950s as a complete circular beltway around Memphis. The western segment between I-40 and I-55 was designated as I-255 until 1973, however. Citizen opposition to the routing of I-40 through Overton Park in the central part of Memphis resulted in I-40 being rerouted onto what was originally the northern loop of I-240 in 1981. As a result of this change, I-240's exits are still numbered according to their original mileage, which today is inconsistent with its length.

== Route description ==
I-240 begins as a north–south route in Midtown Memphis east of downtown at a directional T interchange with I-40, which shifts from an east–west to a temporary north–south alignment here. The ramps carrying traffic between I-40 and I-240 merge approximately 3/4 mile (1.2 km) north of this interchange to avoid interference with the State Route 14 (SR 14, Jackson Avenue) interchange on I-40, which is also directly accessible from I-240 northbound here. I-240 runs almost directly south here, carrying six throughlanes, and reaches interchanges with Madison Avenue, Union Avenue, and E. H. Crump Boulevard/Lamar Avenue (unsigned U.S. Route 78 (US 78)) a short distance beyond this point. Access between these interchanges is provided via a complex network of collector–distributor lanes, and direct access to and from I-40 is also provided for Madison Avenue. Shifting slightly to the west, I-240 continues southward, crossing a railyard and passing next to Elmwood Cemetery before reaching a cloverleaf interchange with South Parkway about 2.5 miles (4.0 km) later. The freeway continues south, shifting slightly eastward, and reaches a combination interchange with I-55 in South Memphis about four miles (6.4 km) later. Here, a series of two-lane ramps carry I-240 traffic from a north–south to an east–west alignment.

I-240 continues east-northeast once again as a six-lane freeway and immediately crosses US 51 (Elvis Presley Boulevard) without an interchange. It then passes through the southern neighborhoods of Memphis for the next four miles (6.4 km) before intersecting with a connector road to the Memphis International Airport to the south. This interchange is almost a complete cloverleaf, with three loop ramps and one underpass ramp. A few miles later, the highway reaches US 78 (Lamar Avenue) in an interchange that is also nearly a complete cloverleaf, with three loop ramps and one flyover ramp. Here, the Interstate expands to eight lanes and shifts slightly east-southeast. A short distance later, I-240 has a partial cloverleaf interchange (parclo) with the northern terminus of SR 176 (Getwell Road). Over the next three miles (4.8 km), I-240 runs along the northern bank of Nonconnah Creek, shifting east-northeast before reaching an interchange with the western terminus of SR 385 (Bill Morris Parkway), a controlled-access spur that serves the southeastern suburbs of Memphis, where it briefly reduces to six lanes. The highway then turns and proceeds north, expanding back to eight lanes, and reaches an unusually configured interchange with US 72 (Poplar Avenue) a short distance later. Continuing almost directly north, the freeway reaches a parclo interchange with Walnut Grove Road (the unsigned western terminus of SR 23) almost two miles (3.2 km) beyond this point. I-240 then gradually shifts northwest and reaches its northern terminus almost two miles (3.2 km) later at a four-level stack interchange with I-40, Sam Cooper Boulevard, and US 64/US 70/US 79 (Summer Avenue) in East Memphis.

== Honorary designations ==
The section of I-240 between I-55 and Airways Boulevard, along with part of I-55 to the west, was named the "W.B. Fowler Sr. Expressway" by the Memphis City Commission in 1960 in honor of William B. Fowler, who served as city engineer between 1919 and 1962. In 1971, the section between the western terminus with I-40 and I-55, along with what is now part of I-40 north of the western terminus, was designated the "Dr. Martin Luther King Jr. Expressway" by the city of Memphis after the civil rights leader who was assassinated there in 1968. The section between Airways Boulevard and the eastern terminus with I-40 was designated the "Avron B. Fogelman Expressway" by the Tennessee General Assembly in 1988 after Avron Fogelman, a Memphis businessman.

== History ==
=== Planning and construction controversies ===
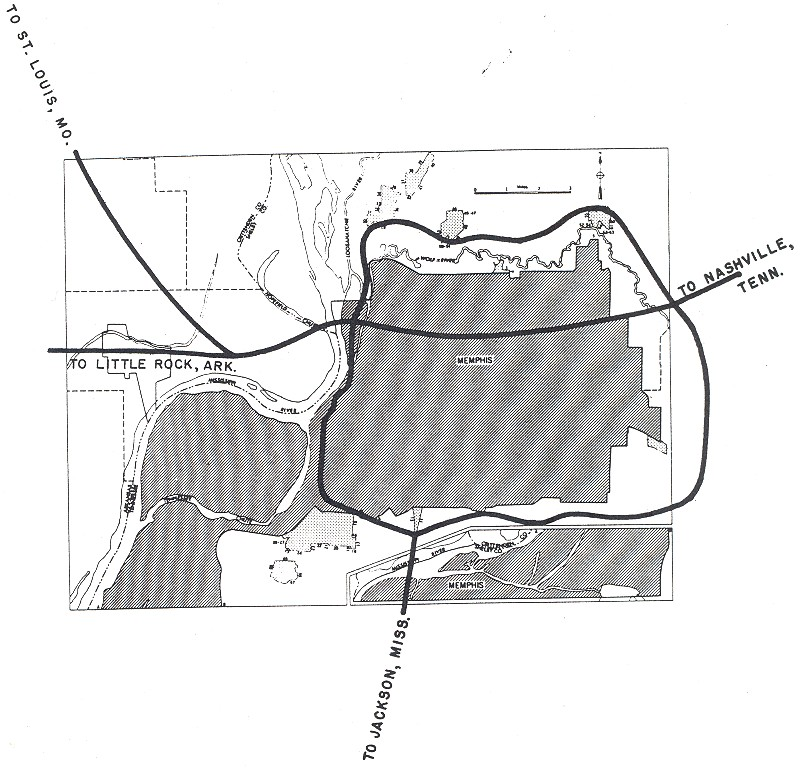
1955 Interstate Highway plan for Memphis

I-240 was first planned in 1955 as part of a 30.8-mile (49.6 km) beltway that would completely encircle midtown Memphis. This beltway would have run along the riverfront and Mud Island in Downtown Memphis, and a north-south and east-west freeway would intersect a short distance east of the riverfront. By July 1956, part of the riverfront freeway between Crump Boulevard and the east-west freeway, which became I-40 was cancelled due to opposition from the Bureau of Public Roads, the predecessor to the Federal Highway Administration (FHWA). This resulted in the north-south route to the east becoming part of the beltway, although plans for a freeway across Mud Island remained for many years afterwards.

On November 12, 1958, most of the beltway was given the designation I-240 with the exception of the segment between I-40 and I-55, which was designated as I-255. On November 1, 1971, the Tennessee Department of Highways sent a request to the FHWA to renumber I-255 as part of I-240, which was approved by the American Association of State Highway and Transportation Officials (AASHTO) on November 10, 1973. I-40 was planned to run directly east to west between what is now the western terminus of I-240 in downtown, commonly known as the Midtown Interchange, and what is now the eastern terminus of I-240 in eastern Memphis. However, in 1957, citizens collected 10,000 signatures protesting the route of I-40, which was to cut through Overton Park, a 342-acre (138 ha) public park in Midtown that contained a wooded refuge, the Memphis Zoo, the Memphis Brooks Museum of Art, the Memphis College of Art, a 9-hole golf course, an amphitheater that was the site of Elvis Presley's first paid concert in 1954, and other features. They also founded an activist group called Citizens to Preserve Overton Park, and waged a multiyear legal battle, which culminated in the U.S. Supreme Court ruling in their favor in Citizens to Preserve Overton Park v. Volpe in 1971.

The Supreme Court remanded the case to the District Court for further review, ruling that planners had not adequately explored alternative routes. TDOT officials, however, continued to explore alternative options to construct the route through Overton Park, including tunneling under the park or constructing the highway below grade, but ultimately concluded that these alternatives were too expensive. On January 9, 1981, then-Governor Lamar Alexander submitted a request to the then-Secretary of Transportation Neil Goldschmidt to cancel the route through Overton Park, which was approved seven days later. About $280 million (equivalent to $838 million in 2025) had been budgeted by the federal government for this route; these funds were then diverted for other transportation improvements in the Memphis metropolitan area. On June 28, 1982, AASHTO approved an application by TDOT to redesignate the northern portion of I-240 as the remainder of I-40. This turned I-240 into a semi-beltway around the southern part of the city, and exits were not renumbered. Part of the proposed I-40 route was constructed from North Highland Street east to the eastern I-40/I-240 junction. The road is now called Sam Cooper Boulevard and is owned by the city. In addition, right-of-way was acquired west of the park and many structures demolished to make way for the Interstate. Most of these empty lots have since been built over.

=== Construction ===
The first segment of I-240 to begin construction was the interchange with I-240 and the short stretch extending from here east to US 78 (Lamar Avenue). A contract for this project was awarded on July 25, 1958. The segment between I-55 and US 78 opened on December 15, 1962, along with a short connecting section of I-55 to the south. The section between US 78 and Walnut Grove Road opened on December 31, 1962. The section between Walnut Grove Road and the interchange with I-40 and Sam Cooper Boulevard, along with the short segment of I-40 north to US 64/US 70/US 79 (Summer Avenue), which was then part of I-240, was dedicated on October 9, 1963, and opened 14 days later. On July 23, 1965, the segment between I-55 and South Parkway opened. The segment between South Parkway and US 78 (Lamar Avenue, E. H. Crump Boulevard) opened on October 20, 1966. The section between US 78 and Union Avenue opened on May 27, 1971. The final section of the present-day alignment of I-240, located between Union Avenue and the Midtown interchange with I-40, opened on July 14, 1971. The connecting segments of I-40 between the Midtown interchange and Chelsea Avenue, which was then signed as part of I-240, and between US 51 and the Midtown interchange, were also opened at the same time. The last section of what was originally part of I-240 to be completed was the section between Chelsea Avenue and US 64/US 70/US 79, which is now part of I-40. Construction on this segment began in April 1974, and the section was opened to traffic on March 28, 1980, after years of delays.

=== I-40/I-240 interchange reconstructions ===
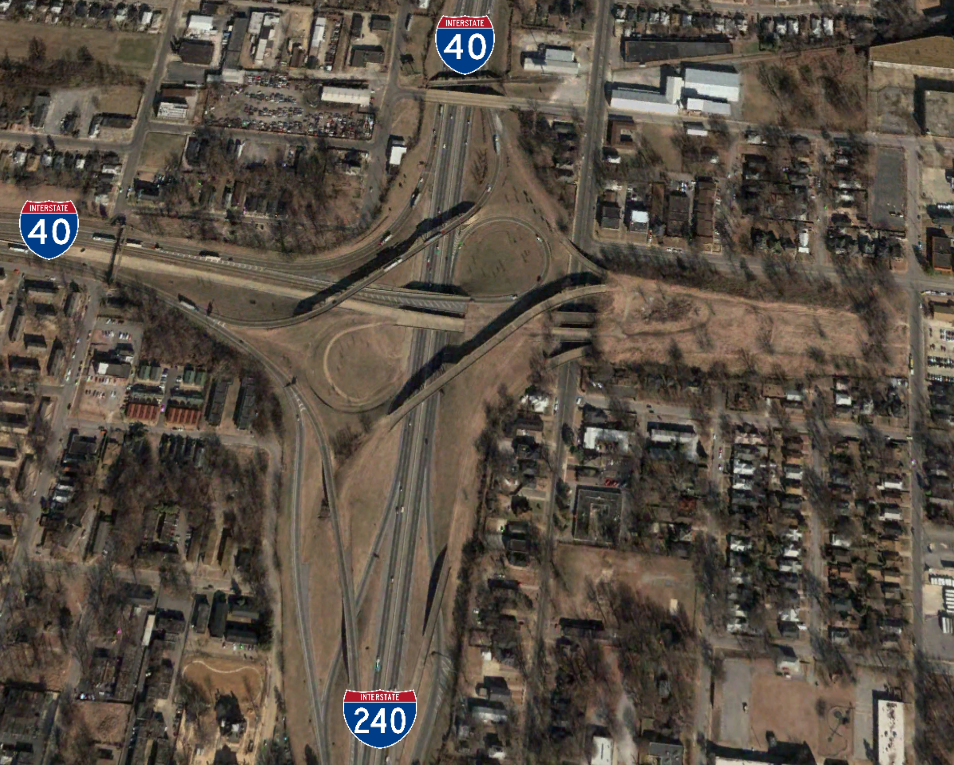
The interchange between I-40 and I-240 in Midtown Memphis in 2003, shortly before reconstruction. Unused ramps and bridges and grading for the canceled section of I-40 (right) are visible.

The cancelation of the section of I-40 through Overton Park rendered both interchanges with I-240 inadequate to handle the unplanned traffic patterns, thus necessitating their reconstruction. In addition, both interchanges contained ramps with hazardous sharp curves with some of the highest crash rates in the state. On the eastern interchange, reconstruction was accomplished in two separate projects. The first project, which began in January 2001 and was completed in June 2003, constructed a new two-lane flyover ramp from I-40 westbound to I-240 westbound, replacing a single-lane loop ramp, and widened I-240 south of the interchange. Also in this project, I-40 directly north of the interchange was reconstructed in preparation for the second project and the interchanges with US 64/US 70/US 79 (Summer Avenue) and White Station Road were modified.

The second project was initially slated to begin in January 2004 but was delayed until October 2013 due to funding and redesign complications. A two-lane flyover was constructed to carry I-40 eastbound traffic through the interchange, replacing a one-lane ramp with a slow design speed. The single-lane ramp carrying I-40 westbound traffic through the interchange was rerouted to become the exit ramp for Summer Avenue and replaced with a two-lane flyover that connects to the flyover constructed in the first project. Additional aspects of this project widened the ramp between I-240 eastbound and I-40 eastbound to three lanes, widened both approaches to the interchange on I-40, which required a new 14-lane bridge over the Wolf River, widened the approach on I-240 south of the interchange, added throughlanes to Sam Cooper Boulevard, and reconfigured the SR 204 (Covington Pike) interchange. The project costed $109.3 million (equivalent to $149 million in 2025), which was, at the time, the highest-bid contract in state history and was completed on December 15, 2016.

The interchange with the western terminus of I-240 near Midtown Memphis was reconstructed between June 2003 and December 2006. This project consisted of converting the interchange into a directional T-interchange and the demolition of several unused ramps and bridges that had been constructed with the intent of I-40 continuing directly east of this interchange prior to the Overton Park controversy. The nearby cloverleaf interchange with SR 14 (Jackson Avenue) was also converted into a parclo interchange, and several additional auxiliary lanes and slip ramps were constructed. The northern merge with I-40 and I-240 was moved north of the SR 14 interchange.

=== Other projects ===
I-240 has seen significant reconstruction over its history as usage has exceeded design capacity. The 9.5-mile (15.3 km) section between US 78 and the eastern terminus with I-40/Sam Cooper Boulevard was the only portion of I-240 that was originally four lanes. It was widened to six lanes beginning in 1983. On August 3, 1990, a contract was awarded to construct the interchange with SR 385 and a short section of this route, widen 3.5 miles (5.6 km) of I-240 to eight lanes from Perkins Road to US 72, build collector-distributor lanes and ramps along I-240 between Mt. Moriah Road and the interchange with SR 385, and build the first one mile (1.6 km) of SR 385. The project cost $44.75 million (equivalent to $97.3 million in 2025), which was at the time the most expensive individual contract ever awarded by TDOT. The project was completed in January 1994.

The portion between US 78 (Lamar Avenue) and Mount Moriah Road was widened from six to eight through lanes between October 2001 and October 2003. An extension of I-69 through Tennessee was proposed under the 1991 Intermodal Surface Transportation Efficiency Act (ISTEA) as part of a corridor to facilitate trade between Canada and Mexico. This extension was further spearheaded by the enactment of the North American Free Trade Agreement (NAFTA) in 1994. This extension, sometimes considered part of the unofficial NAFTA superhighway, was proposed to utilize the section of I-55 between the Mississippi border and I-240, and continue north along I-240 onto I-40 and SR 300. On January 18, 2008, the FHWA authorized Mississippi and Tennessee to sign I-69 between an interchange on I-55 in Hernando, Mississippi, and the I-40/SR 300 interchange in north Memphis. Tennessee has not signed the extension of the route, although Mississippi has already done so. It is unclear, however, if the route will ever be built through Memphis.

A widening project began on the stretch of I-240 from north of SR 385 to north of Walnut Grove Road in April 2011. This included adding one throughlane in each direction and a redesigning of the US 72 (Poplar Avenue) interchange, as well as new retaining walls and noise barriers. The project was completed in late 2014, more than one year later than initially expected.

=== Major incidents ===
On December 23, 1988, a tanker truck hauling liquefied propane crashed at the interchange between I-40 and the western terminus of I-240 and exploded, producing a massive fireball that enveloped the Interstate and started multiple structural fires. The tank was then propelled from the highway by the force of the combusting gas within the tank and crashed into a nearby duplex, starting additional fires. The incident resulted in the deaths of six motorists and three occupants of nearby buildings and injured 10 people.

On March 24, 2010, a sinkhole formed in the two leftmost northbound lanes north of the Walnut Grove interchange. It was initially thought to have been a smaller pothole and had been paved over the day before. It formed around 3:00 pm and damaged several cars, although no injuries were reported. These two lanes were shut down until March 28 while the sinkhole was filled.

== Exit list ==
The exits on I-240 run clockwise, reflecting their initial numbering as part of a circumferential beltway. Because of the rerouting of I-40, this Interstate retains I-240's historic exit numbers 1 through 12A–C. The entire route is in Memphis, Shelby County.

mi	km	Exit	Destinations	Notes
0.00	0.00		I-40 west – Little Rock	Counterclockwise terminus; exit 12C on I-40
		12A	US 64 / US 70 / US 79 (SR 1 / Summer Avenue)	No westbound exit
		12	I-40 east / Sam Cooper Boulevard west – Nashville	Signed as exits 12B (west) and 12C (east); no westbound access to I-40; exit 10A on I-40; exits 10A-B on Sam Cooper Boulevard
1.81	2.91	13	Walnut Grove Road (SR 23 west)	Signed as exits 13A (west) and 13B (east) westbound; eastern terminus of SR 23
3.67	5.91	15	US 72 (SR 57 / Poplar Avenue) – Germantown	Signed as exits 15A (east) and 15B (west)
5.18– 5.30	8.34– 8.53	16	SR 385 east (Bill Morris Parkway) – Collierville	Western terminus of SR 385
6.07	9.77	17	Mount Moriah Road	
6.94	11.17	18	Perkins Road	
8.33	13.41	20	SR 176 south (Getwell Road)	Signed as exits 20A (south) and 20B (north) eastbound; northern terminus of SR 176
9.75	15.69	21	US 78 / SR 4 (Lamar Avenue) – Birmingham	SR 4 not signed
11.48	18.48	23	Airways Boulevard - Memphis International Airport	Signed as exits 23A (north) and 23B (south)
12.76– 12.87	20.54– 20.71	24	Millbranch Road / Nonconnah Boulevard	
13.86	22.31	25	I-55 – Jackson, Miss., St. Louis	Signed as exits 25A (south) and 25B (north); southern end of future I-69 concurrency; exits 6A-B on I-55
		26	To Norris Road	Northbound exit only; access via Hernando Road
14.53	23.38	26	Norris Road	No northbound exit
16.38	26.36	28	South Parkway	Signed as exits 28A (east) and 28B (west)
17.85	28.73	29	Lamar Avenue ( US 78 / SR 4) / Crump Boulevard	
18.36	29.55	30	Union Avenue (US 51 / US 64 / US 70 / US 79)	Northbound exit and southbound entrance
18.49	29.76	30	Madison Avenue	Southbound exit and northbound entrance
19.13	30.79	31	I-40 west – Little Rock	Northbound exit and southbound entrance; exit 1E on I-40
		32	SR 14 (Jackson Avenue)	Northbound exit and southbound entrance
19.80	31.87		I-40 east – Nashville	Clockwise terminus; northern end of future I-69 concurrency
1.000 mi = 1.609 km; 1.000 km = 0.621 mi: Concurrency terminus; Incomplete access

== See also ==
- Transportation in Memphis, Tennessee
