= Toone, Tennessee =

- Town
- Location of Toone in Hardeman County, Tennessee
- Coordinates: 35°21′8″N 88°57′14″W
- Country: United States
- State: Tennessee
- County: Hardeman
- Established: 1856
- Incorporated: 1903
- Named for: James Toone (early settler)

Area
  - Total: 1.08 sq mi (2.79 km^{2})
  - Land: 1.08 sq mi (2.79 km^{2})
  - Water: 0 sq mi (0.00 km^{2})
- Elevation: 410 ft (125 m)

Population (2020)
  - Total: 270
  - Density: 251.1/sq mi (96.94/km^{2})
- Time zone: UTC-6 (Central (CST))
  - Summer (DST): UTC-5 (CDT)
- ZIP code: 38381
- Area code: 731
- FIPS code: 47-74640
- GNIS feature ID: 1304137

Toone is a town in Hardeman County, Tennessee, United States. As of the 2020 census, Toone had a population of 270.

== History ==
Toone is located in the former Chickasaw country. The first Europeans to visit the area arrived on flatboats via the Hatchie River as early as 1725. By 1830 the community was populated enough that it was included in the United States census. In 1856, Toone developed into a railroad town with businesses opening up around the railroad. Brick manufacturing became the major industry, and many homes still have original Toone bricks in their architecture. During the Civil War, the town served as an encampment for the Union Army and saw one small skirmish for rail line control.

=== Kilgore Flares Company explosion ===
On September 14, 2010, an explosion and flash fire occurred at the Kilgore Flares Company plant near Toone. Six workers were injured in the mishap, three of them critically. Another accident at the facility in 2001 caused the death of one employee. Kilgore manufactures airborne expendable decoy flares for the US military.

== Geography ==
Toone is located in northern Hardeman County at 35°21′8″N 88°57′14″W (35.352311, -88.953801). Tennessee State Route 138 (SR 138) is Main Street, leading northwest 21 miles (34 km) to Interstate 40 (I-40) between Jackson and Brownsville, and southeast 2 miles (3 km) to its terminus at SR 18. Bolivar, the Hardeman county seat, is 8 miles (13 km) south of Toone via SR 138 and SR 18. SR 100 runs through a northern extension of Toone, leading east 19 miles (31 km) to Henderson and west 11 miles (18 km) to Whiteville.

According to the United States Census Bureau, the town has a total area of 1.0 square mile (2.7 km^{2}), all of it recorded as land. Pugh Creek flows through the southern part of the town, running southwest to Mill Creek and the Hatchie River.

== Demographics ==
Historical population
Census	Pop.	Note	%±
1880	196		—
1890	254		29.6%
1900	241		−5.1%
1910	245		1.7%
1920	294		20.0%
1930	296		0.7%
1940	305		3.0%
1950	231		−24.3%
1960	202		−12.6%
1970	200		−1.0%
1980	355		77.5%
1990	279		−21.4%
2000	330		18.3%
2010	364		10.3%
2020	270		−25.8%

As of the census of 2000, there were 330 people, 107 households, and 80 families residing in the town. The population density was 397.7 inhabitants per square mile (153.6/km^{2}). There were 115 housing units at an average density of 138.6 per square mile (53.5/km^{2}). The racial makeup of the town was 65.45% White, 34.24% African American, and 0.30% from two or more races. Hispanic or Latino of any race were 0.30% of the population.

There were 107 households, out of which 35.5% had children under the age of 18 living with them, 58.9% were married couples living together, 10.3% had a female householder with no husband present, and 24.3% were non-families. 20.6% of all households were made up of individuals, and 3.7% had someone living alone who was 65 years of age or older. The average household size was 2.63 and the average family size was 3.05.

In the town, the population was spread out, with 23.3% under the age of 18, 6.7% from 18 to 24, 28.8% from 25 to 44, 23.6% from 45 to 64, and 17.6% who were 65 years of age or older. The median age was 40 years. For every 100 females, there were 127.6 males. For every 100 females age 18 and over, there were 116.2 males.

The median income for a household in the town was $30,500, and the median income for a family was $32,500. Males had a median income of $29,286 versus $16,500 for females. The per capita income for the town was $12,956. About 12.8% of families and 30.8% of the population were below the poverty line, including 30.3% of those under age 18 and 33.3% of those age 65 or over.

== Economy ==
Toone has a bank and a post office in its downtown area.

Toone is home to the Kilgore Flare Company. The company has operated near Toone since the early 1920s. They manufacture air-deployable decoy flares for use by U.S. military aircraft on a 264-acre (1.07 km^{2}) facility on the town's outskirts. An additional 242-acre (0.98 km^{2}) testing ground is also located near the town.
