= Transportation in Memphis, Tennessee =

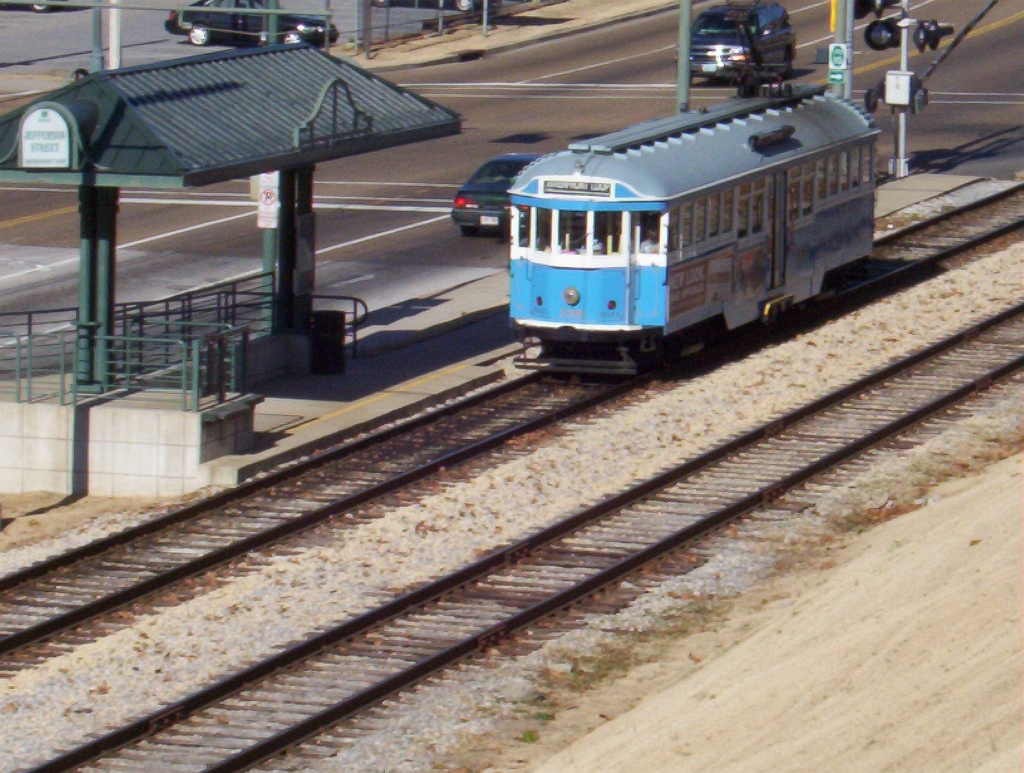
Memphis trolley on the Riverfront loop (2006)

Memphis, Tennessee has developed into a major Mid-American commercial and transportation hub because of its location on the Mississippi River and a convergence of numerous rail and highway links. Four rail and highway bridges cross the Mississippi River at Memphis. In addition, Memphis International Airport has become the world's largest airfreight terminal.

Travel and shipment of freight are facilitated by two major Interstate highways, I-40 and I-55, that intersect at Memphis. I-240 is a highway spur that carries traffic around the city. A large volume of railroad freight traffic moves through Memphis, thanks to two Mississippi River railroad crossings and the convergence at Memphis of east–west with north–south rail routes. In addition, Memphis is the second busiest cargo port on the Mississippi River.

Local public transportation in the Memphis area is provided by the Memphis Area Transit Authority.

== Roads and highways ==
=== Interstates ===
The primary Interstate highways in Memphis are Interstate 40 (I-40), its spur highway I-240, and I-55. I-40 and I-55 (along with two rail lines) cross the Mississippi River in Memphis from the state of Arkansas. The city is also served by other minor Interstates and freeways. I-22 connects the southeast part of Memphis with Mississippi. I-269 is an outer beltway around the city, partially in Mississippi. Tennessee State Route 385 connects I-240 to I-269, passing through Collierville. Future I-69 is planned to run through the Memphis area, running concurrent with I-40, I-240, and I-55.

=== U.S. Highways ===
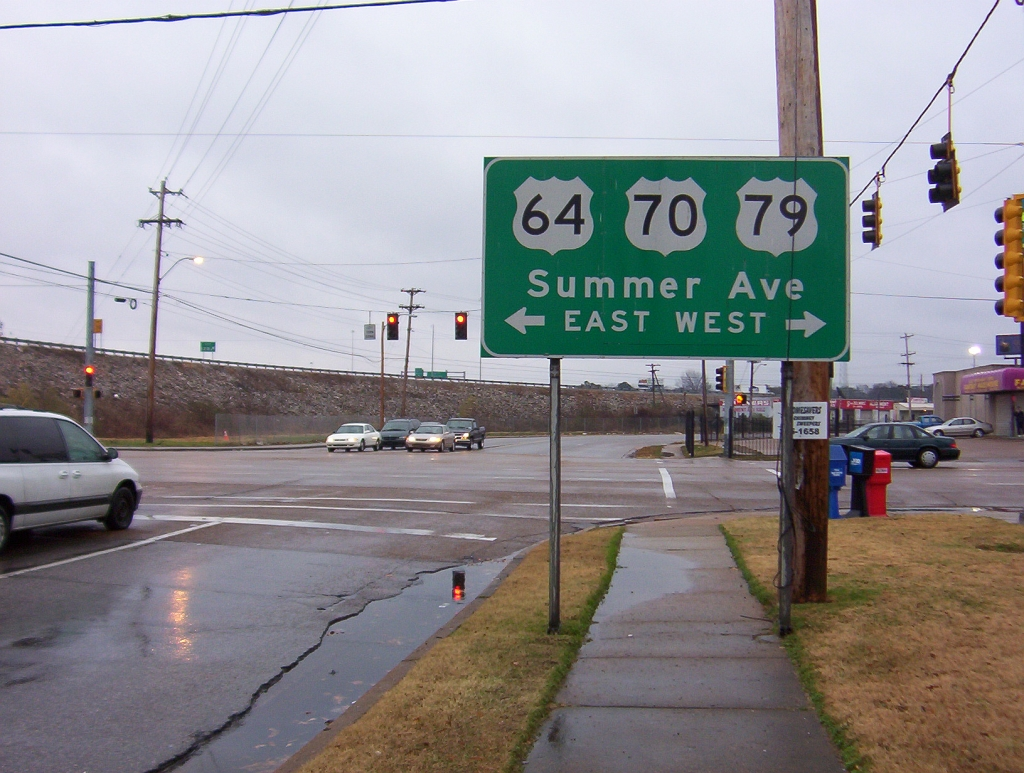
US 64 / US 70 / US 79 travel concurrently in Memphis (2008)

Memphis is served by seven primary U.S. highways, more than any other city in the Southeastern United States.

- US 51 enters Memphis from the south along with SR 3 as Elvis Presley Boulevard. The road changes names to Bellevue Boulevard before meeting Union Avenue. US 51 continues along Union Avenue to Danny Thomas Boulevard, which eventually changes into Thomas Street. The route then heads north towards Millington.
- US 61 enters the city from the south along with SR 14 as Third Street. The highway travels to E.H. Crump Boulevard, turning west and eventually crossing the Memphis & Arkansas Bridge.
- US 64 enters with Interstate 55 (I-55) on the Memphis & Arkansas Bridge, traveling along various streets until eventually heading east from the city along Stage Road towards Somerville.
- US 70 and US 79 travel concurrently in the entirety of the city, traveling from the Memphis & Arkansas Bridge along various streets until eventually meeting Summer Avenue. The two highways continue to the northeast, paralleling I-40 towards Brownsville.
- US 72 travels through Memphis along Poplar Avenue, one of the city's main roads. It leaves the city at the city limits of Germantown.
- US 78 leaves the city traveling to the southeast. The west end of US 78 begins in Memphis on Linden Avenue at the intersection of 2nd Street. As it leaves Memphis, US 78 follows Lamar Avenue, historically known as Pigeon Roost Road for the nestings of passenger pigeons formerly in the vicinity.

=== Walking and bicycling ===
Memphis is a large city with underdeveloped sidewalk and bicycling infrastructure. A report by Smart Growth America in 2024 identified Memphis as the deadliest metro area in the United States for pedestrians. Cycling in Memphis is more popular, although primarily for recreation. The city has constructed over 300 miles of bike lanes since 2010 although they are primarily installed during street repaving, creating a fractured network. The Wolf River Greenway and Shelby Farms Greenline bike paths are popular recreational cycling routes. Despite this, a 2023 study by real estate website Clever also found the city to be the least bike friendly in the nation.

== Railroad ==
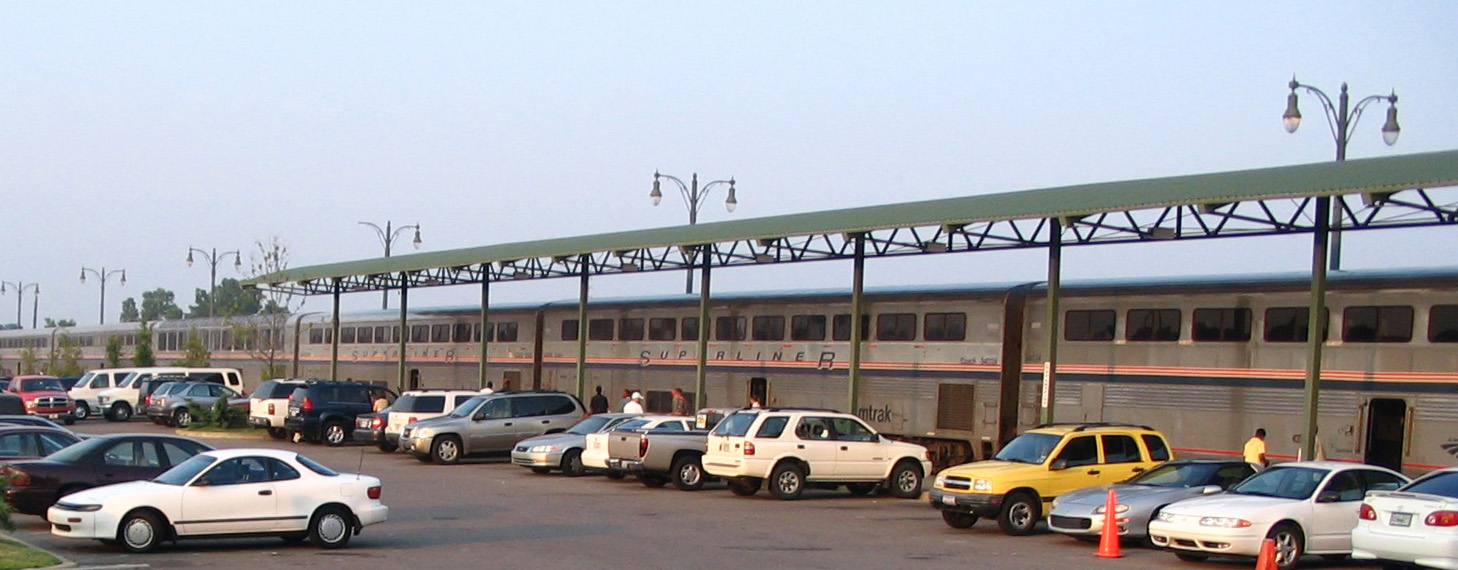
Central Station, a stop of the City of New Orleans (2005)

A large volume of railroad freight traffic moves through Memphis, thanks to two Mississippi River railroad crossings and the convergence of east–west rail routes with north–south routes.

Memphis had two major rail passenger stations, Memphis Union Station, razed in early 1969, and Memphis Central Station, which has been renovated. The Central Station renovation was completed in November 1999.

=== City of New Orleans ===
Central Station serves Amtrak's City of New Orleans route between Chicago and New Orleans.

Amtrak Train 59, the southbound City of New Orleans, is scheduled to depart Memphis at 6:50am daily with service to Greenwood, Yazoo City, Jackson, Hazlehurst, Brookhaven, McComb, Hammond, and New Orleans.

Amtrak Train 58, the northbound City of New Orleans, is scheduled to depart Memphis at 10:40pm daily with service to Newbern-Dyersburg, Fulton, Carbondale, Centralia, Effingham, Mattoon, Champaign-Urbana, Kankakee, Homewood, and Chicago.

=== Freight ===
Five Class I railroads operate in Memphis: Union Pacific (UP), Norfolk Southern (NS), BNSF Railway (BNSF), CSX Transportation (CSXT), and Canadian National (CN). Short-line railroad RJ Corman also owns track branching off of BNSF's Memphis Intermodal Facility. Memphis Intermodal Facility - Tennessee Yard is one of ten freight rail facilities located in Memphis. The others are Leewood Yard (CSXT), Sargent Yard (UP), Forrest Yard (NS), Yale Yard (BNSF), Harrison (Johnson) Yard (CN), CN supply chain solutions, Port of Memphis (CN), and Intermodal Gateway (CN, CSXT). Of these facilities, the only ones capable of loading and unloading containers are Forrest Yard, Intermodal Gateway, and Memphis Intermodal Facility.

== Public transportation ==
=== Local transit ===
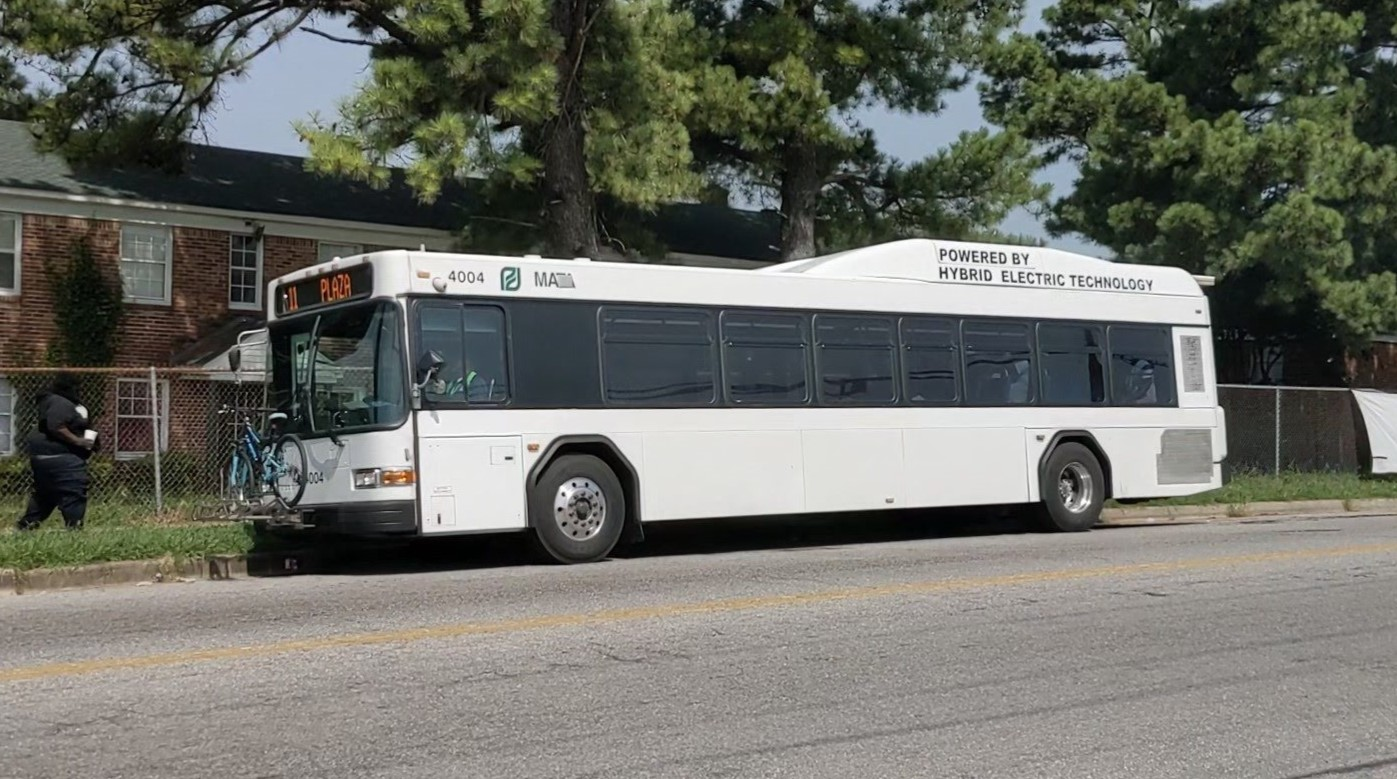
MATA bus in Frayser (2024)

Memphis Area Transit Authority (MATA) operates 23 bus routes, on-demand vans, and paratransit service for persons with disabilities. MATA also operates a heritage trolley system in Downtown Memphis with 24 stations along three lines. The trolley system has been out of service since August 2024 due to MATA's lack of funds to make brake repairs mandated by TDOT.

There is also a monorail known as the Memphis Suspension Railway, which connects the city to Mud Island. The monorail opened in 1982 and ceased operation in 2018 due to mechanical issues.

=== Intercity transit ===
Intercity bus service to the city is provided by Flixbus, Greyhound Lines, and Jefferson Lines. The buses stop at Airways Transit Center, which is located next to Memphis International Airport and is owned by MATA.

== Airports ==
Memphis International Airport, which handled more cargo than any other airport in the world until 2010, is Memphis's sole commercial airport. It remains the busiest cargo airport in the United States as of 2025. The airport is the international cargo hub for FedEx and was a passenger hub for Delta Air Lines after their merger with Northwest Airlines in 2008. Other passenger airlines providing service to the airport are Allegiant Air, American Airlines, Frontier Airlines, Southwest Airlines, and United Airlines.

The Tennessee Air National Guard operates the 164th Airlift Wing at the airport.

Memphis is also served by multiple general aviation (GA) airports. General Dewitt Spain Airport, located about 4 miles from Downtown Memphis, is the only one within city limits. The other GA airports are West Memphis Municipal Airport (about 10 mi from Downtown), Charles W. Baker Airport (about 11 mi from Downtown), Millington-Memphis Airport (about 17 mi from Downtown), and Olive Branch Airport (about 18 mi from Downtown).

== Mississippi River port ==
The International Port of Memphis is the 2nd biggest cargo port on the Mississippi River (the 4th biggest inland port in the United States). The International Port of Memphis covers the Tennessee and Arkansas sides of the Mississippi River from river mile 725 (km 1167) to mile 740 (km 1191). At 15 mi (24 km) long, it has 68 water fronted facilities, 37 of which are terminal facilities for moving products from shore to ship or vice versa. It is 400 mi (644 km) downriver from St. Louis, Missouri and 600 mi (966 km) upriver from New Orleans.

== Mississippi River bridges ==
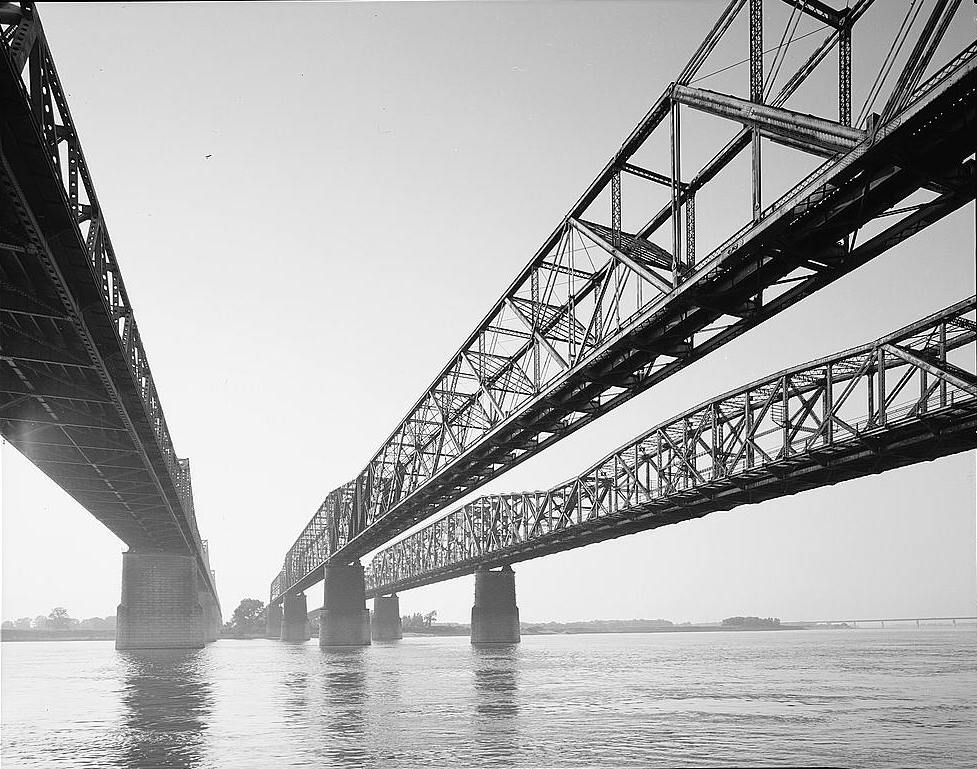
Memphis & Arkansas, Frisco and Harahan bridges (1985)

Four rail and highway bridges cross the Mississippi River at Memphis. They are, in order of their opening: the Frisco Bridge, the Harahan Bridge, the Memphis & Arkansas Bridge and the Hernando de Soto Bridge. The piers of the first three bridges had to be lined up for river navigation as they were built side by side at a narrow point in the river.

=== Frisco Bridge ===
The Frisco Bridge (May 12, 1892) was the longest bridge in North America when it opened and was originally called the Great Bridge at Memphis. This cantilever truss steel railroad bridge was built between 1888–1892. It was designed by George S. Morison, who also designed the Taft Bridge in Washington, D.C.

=== Harahan Bridge ===
The Harahan Bridge (July 14, 1916) is a trestle railroad bridge originally built with narrow, one-way wooden cantilevered roadways along the outsides so it could be used for cars. In 1928, sparks from a train ignited and set fire to one of the wooden plank roads. At present only trains use the Harahan Bridge, but a pedestrian walkway and bike path was completed in fall 2016.

=== Memphis & Arkansas Bridge ===
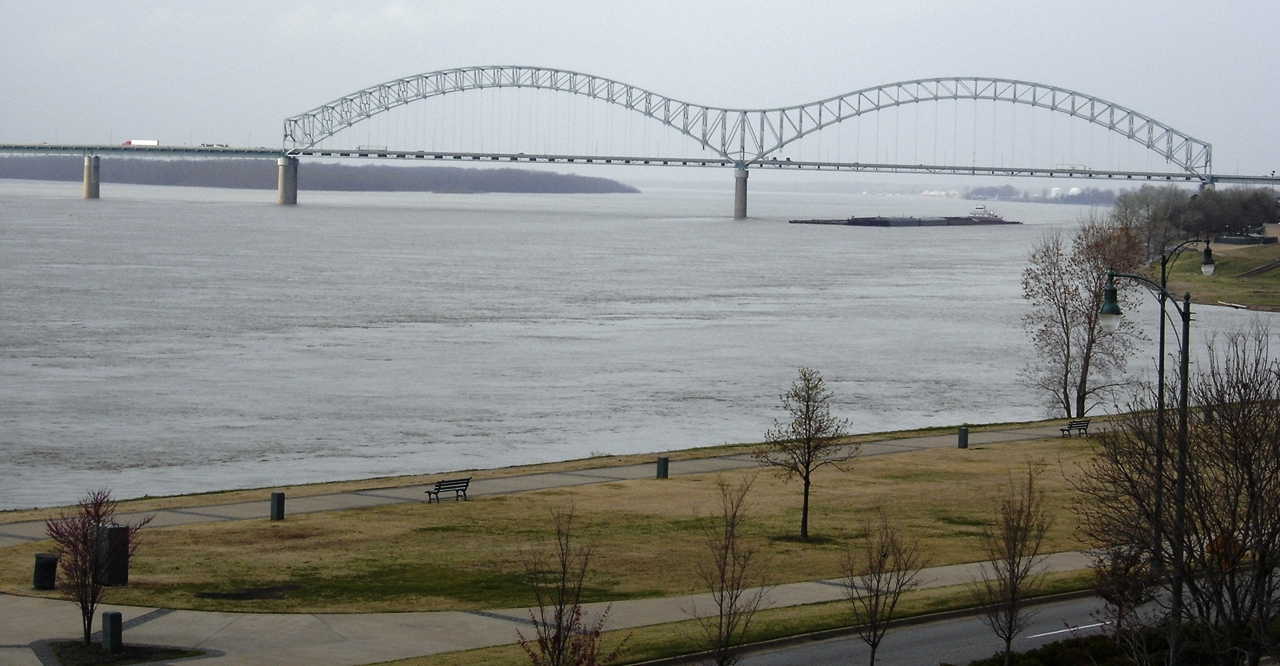
Hernando de Soto Bridge (2007)

The Memphis & Arkansas Bridge (December 17, 1949), carries Interstate 55 and has a pedestrian walkway. The bridge was built between 1945–1949 and is the longest Warren truss- style bridge in the United States. It is listed on the National Historic Register.

=== Hernando de Soto Bridge ===
The Hernando de Soto Bridge (August 2, 1973) with its steel arches carries Interstate 40. In 1986, M-shaped lights became part of the bridge and a Memphis landmark.

The Guinness Book of World Records lists the de Soto bridge for its unique structural "letter" shape. In 2001 the mysterious disappearance and death of Harvard University biophysicist Don Wiley, whose abandoned car was found on the bridge, brought the Hernando de Soto Bridge national headlines.

The de Soto bridge once again made national headlines in May 2021, when a crack developed in one of the bridge trusses. The bridge was closed for 3.5 months as repairs were made and fully reopened on August 3, 2021.

=== Bridges overview ===
Name	Nickname	Total length	Opening date
Frisco Bridge		4,887 ft (1,490 m)	12 May 1892
Harahan Bridge		4,973 ft (1,516 m)	14 July 1916
Memphis & Arkansas Bridge	"Old Bridge"	5,222 ft (1,592 m)	17 Dec. 1949
Hernando de Soto Bridge	"New Bridge"; "Dolly Parton Bridge"; "M Bridge"	19,535 ft (5,954 m)	2 Aug. 1973
