= List of airports in Tennessee =

This is a list of airports in Tennessee (a U.S. state), grouped by type and sorted by location. It contains all public-use and military airports in the state. Some private-use and former airports may be included where notable, such as airports that were previously public-use, those with commercial enplanements recorded by the FAA or airports assigned an IATA airport code.

== Airports ==
This list contains the following information:

- **City served** – The city generally associated with the airport, as per the airport's master record with the Federal Aviation Administration. This is not always the actual location since some airports are located in smaller towns outside of the city they serve. It is not meant to be a complete list of cities served, which can be found in or added to each airport's Wikipedia article.
- **FAA** – The location identifier assigned by the Federal Aviation Administration (FAA). These are linked to each airport's page at the Tennessee Department of Transportation.
- **IATA** – The airport code assigned by the International Air Transport Association (IATA). Those that do not match the FAA code are shown in bold.
- **ICAO** – The location indicator assigned by the International Civil Aviation Organization (ICAO).
- **Airport name** – The official airport name. Those shown in **bold** indicate the airport has scheduled passenger service on commercial airlines.
- **Role** – One of four FAA airport categories, as per the 2021–2025 National Plan of Integrated Airport Systems (NPIAS) report released September 2020:
  - P-s: Commercial service – primary are publicly owned airports that receive scheduled passenger service and have more than 10,000 passenger boardings (enplanements) each year. Each primary airport is sub-classified by the FAA as one of the following four "hub" types (s):
    - L: Large hub that accounts for at least 1% of total U.S. passenger enplanements.
    - M: Medium hub that accounts for between 0.25% and 1% of total U.S. passenger enplanements.
    - S: Small hub that accounts for between 0.05% and 0.25% of total U.S. passenger enplanements.
    - N: Nonhub that accounts for less than 0.05% of total U.S. passenger enplanements, but more than 10,000 annual enplanements.
  - CS: Commercial service – nonprimary are publicly owned airports that receive scheduled passenger service and have at least 2,500 passenger boardings each year.
  - R: Reliever airports are designated by the FAA to relieve congestion at a large commercial service airport and to provide more general aviation access to the overall community.
  - GA: General aviation airports are the largest single group of airports in the U.S. airport system. They are public-use airports that do not have scheduled service or have scheduled service with less than 2,500 passenger boardings each year.
- **Enplanements** – The number of enplanements (commercial passenger boardings) that occurred at the airport in calendar year 2024, as per FAA records released October 2025.

City served	FAA	IATA	ICAO	Airport name	Role	Enplanements (2024)
				**Commercial service – primary airports**		
Chattanooga	CHA	CHA	KCHA	**Chattanooga Metropolitan Airport** (Lovell Field)	P-S	557,741
Knoxville	TYS	TYS	KTYS	**McGhee Tyson Airport**	P-S	1,639,080
Memphis	MEM	MEM	KMEM	**Memphis International Airport**	P-M	2,439,366
Nashville	BNA	BNA	KBNA	**Nashville International Airport** (Berry Field)	P-L	12,058,688
Tri-Cities	TRI	TRI	KTRI	**Tri-Cities Airport**	P-N	229,860
				**Commercial service – nonprimary airports**		
Jackson	MKL	MKL	KMKL	**Jackson Regional Airport**	CS	3,383
				**Reliever airports**		
Knoxville	DKX		KDKX	Knoxville Downtown Island Airport	R	4
Memphis	M01			General DeWitt Spain Airport	R	0
Millington	2M8			Charles W. Baker Airport	R	0
Nashville	JWN		KJWN	John C. Tune Airport	R	712
Smyrna	MQY	MQY	KMQY	Smyrna Airport	R	1,497
				**General aviation airports**		
Athens	MMI	MMI	KMMI	McMinn County Airport	GA	0
Bolivar	M08			William L. Whitehurst Field	GA	0
Camden	0M4			Benton County Airport	GA	0
Centerville	GHM	GHM	KGHM	Centerville Municipal Airport	GA	0
Clarksville	CKV	CKV	KCKV	Outlaw Field	GA	0
Cleveland	RZR		KRZR	Cleveland Regional Jetport	GA	74
Clifton	M29			Hassel Field	GA	0
Columbia / Mt. Pleasant	MRC	MRC	KMRC	Maury County Regional Airport	GA	0
Copperhill / Ducktown	1A3			Martin Campbell Field	GA	0
Covington	M04			Covington Municipal Airport	GA	0
Crossville	CSV	CSV	KCSV	Crossville Memorial Airport (Whitson Field)	GA	5
Dayton	2A0			Mark Anton Airport	GA	0
Dickson	M02			Dickson Municipal Airport	GA	5
Dyersburg	DYR		KDYR	Dyersburg Regional Airport	GA	0
Elizabethton	0A9			Elizabethton Municipal Airport	GA	51
Fayetteville	FYM	FYM	KFYM	Fayetteville Municipal Airport	GA	0
Gainesboro	1A7			Jackson County Airport	GA	0
Gallatin	XNX		KXNX	Music City Executive Airport	GA	0
Greeneville	GCY	GCY	KGCY	Greeneville Municipal Airport	GA	0
Humboldt	M53			Humboldt Municipal Airport	GA	0
Huntingdon / McKenzie	HZD		KHZD	Carroll County Airport	GA	0
Jacksboro	JAU		KJAU	Colonel Tommy C. Stiner Airfield	GA	0
Jamestown	2A1			Jamestown Municipal Airport	GA	0
Jasper	APT	APT	KAPT	Marion County Airport (Brown Field)	GA	7
Lafayette	3M7			Lafayette Municipal Airport	GA	0
Lawrenceburg	2M2			Lawrenceburg-Lawrence County Airport	GA	0
Lebanon	M54			Lebanon Municipal Airport	GA	4
Lewisburg	LUG		KLUG	Ellington Airport	GA	2
Lexington / Parsons	PVE		KPVE	Beech River Regional Airport	GA	0
Linden	M15			James Tucker Airport	GA	0
Livingston	8A3			Livingston Municipal Airport	GA	2
Madisonville	MNV		KMNV	Monroe County Airport	GA	0
McMinnville	RNC	RNC	KRNC	Warren County Memorial Airport	GA	0
Millington	NQA	NQA	KNQA	Millington/Memphis Airport	GA	0
Morristown	MOR	MOR	KMOR	Moore-Murrell Airport	GA	0
Mountain City	6A4			Johnson County Airport	GA	0
Murfreesboro	MBT		KMBT	Murfreesboro Municipal Airport	GA	3
Oneida	SCX		KSCX	Scott Municipal Airport	GA	8
Paris	PHT	PHT	KPHT	Henry County Airport	GA	0
Portland	1M5			Portland Municipal Airport	GA	7
Pulaski	GZS		KGZS	Abernathy Field	GA	0
Rockwood	RKW	RKW	KRKW	Rockwood Municipal Airport	GA	0
Rogersville	RVN		KRVN	Hawkins County Airport	GA	0
Savannah	SNH		KSNH	Savannah-Hardin County Airport	GA	0
Selmer	SZY		KSZY	Robert Sibley Airport	GA	0
Sevierville	GKT	GKT	KGKT	Gatlinburg-Pigeon Forge Airport	GA	27
Sewanee	UOS	UOS	KUOS	Franklin County Airport	GA	0
Shelbyville	SYI	SYI	KSYI	Shelbyville Municipal Airport (Bomar Field)	GA	11
Smithville	0A3			Smithville Municipal Airport	GA	0
Somerville	FYE		KFYE	Fayette County Airport	GA	0
Sparta	SRB		KSRB	Upper Cumberland Regional Airport	GA	20
Springfield	M91			Springfield-Robertson County Airport	GA	30
Tazewell	3A2			New Tazewell Municipal Airport	GA	0
Trenton	TGC		KTGC	Gibson County Airport	GA	0
Tullahoma	THA	THA	KTHA	Tullahoma Regional Airport (WM Northern Field)	GA	0
Union City	UCY	UCY	KUCY	Everett-Stewart Regional Airport	GA	0
Waverly	0M5			Humphreys County Airport	GA	0
Winchester	BGF		KBGF	Winchester Municipal Airport	GA	28
				**Other public-use airports** (not listed in NPIAS)		
Benton	92A			Chilhowee Gliderport		
Collegedale	FGU		KFGU	Collegedale Municipal Airport (Linn Field)		4
Eagleville	50M			Puckett Gliderport		
Halls	M31			Arnold Field		
Hohenwald	0M3			Paul Bridges Field		
Johnson City	0A4			Johnson City Airport		
McKinnon	M93			Houston County Airport		
Rossville	54M			Wolf River Airport		
Tiptonville	0M2			Reelfoot Lake Airport		
				**Other military airports**		
Fort Campbell / Clarksville	EOD		KEOD	Sabre Army Heliport		
Arnold Air Force Base / Tullahoma	AYX		KAYX	Arnold Engineering and Development Center		
				**Notable private-use airports**		
Bean Station / Mooresburg	40TN			Cloud 9 Aerodrome		
Kingston	12TN			Riley Creek Airport (was 30A: Meadowlake Airpark)		
Oliver Springs	TN08			Oliver Springs Airport		
				**Notable former airports**		
Arlington	~~LHC~~		~~KLHC~~	Arlington Municipal Airport (closed 1998-2002)		
Brownsville	~~47M~~			Thornton Airport		
Cookeville	~~CJE~~		~~KCJE~~	Putnam County Airport (closed 1997)		
Knoxville	~~9A2~~			Powell STOLport (closed 2009?)		
Lexington	~~M52~~			Franklin Wilkins Airport (closed 2006)	~~GA~~	
Middle Valley / Lakesite	~~1A0~~			Dallas Bay Skypark (Dallas Bay Sky Park) (closed 2021)		
Nashville	~~M88~~			Cornelia Fort Airpark (closed 2011)		
Parsons	~~0M1~~			Scott Field (Decatur County Airport) (closed 2006)	~~GA~~	

== See also ==
- Essential Air Service
- Tennessee World War II Army Airfields
- Wikipedia:WikiProject Aviation/Airline destination lists: North America#Tennessee
