= FGU =

FGU may refer to:

- Collegedale Municipal Airport, in Tennessee, United States
- Fangatau Airport, in French Polynesia
- Fantasy Games Unlimited, a game publisher
- Fo Guang University, a university in Yilan County, Taiwan
- Franco-German University, an international education organisation
- French Guiana, UNDP code
