= Jackson County Airport =

Jackson County Airport may refer to:

- Jackson County Airport (Georgia) in Jackson County, Georgia, United States (FAA: 19A)
- Jackson County Airport (Michigan) in Jackson County, Michigan, United States (FAA: JXN)
- Jackson County Airport (North Carolina) in Jackson County, North Carolina, United States (FAA: 24A)
- Jackson County Airport (Texas) in Jackson County, Texas, United States (FAA: 26R)
- Jackson County Airport (Tennessee) in Jackson County, Tennessee, United States (FAA: 1A7)
- Jackson County Airport (West Virginia) in Jackson County, West Virginia, United States (FAA: I18)
- Walden-Jackson County Airport in Jackson County, Colorado, United States (FAA: 33V)

== Other uses ==
- Rogue Valley International–Medford Airport, formerly Medford–Jackson County Airport, in Jackson County, Oregon, United States
