= GKT =

GKT may refer to:

- Gatlinburg–Pigeon Forge Airport, in Tennessee
- Guy's, King's and St Thomas' Rugby Football Club, based in London
- King's College London GKT School of Medical Education
- Guilty knowledge test, a polygraph technique
