= Clarksville–Montgomery County Regional Airport =

Airport in Tennessee, United States

Clarksville–Montgomery County Regional Airport John F. Outlaw Field

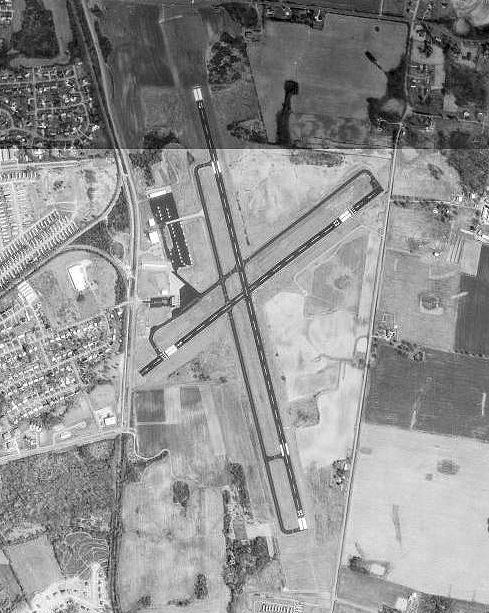
- USGS image 27 March 1992
- IATA: CKV; ICAO: KCKV; FAA LID: CKV

Summary
- Airport type: Public
- Owner: City of Clarksville & Montgomery County
- Serves: Clarksville, Tennessee
- Elevation AMSL: 550 ft (170 m)
- Coordinates: 36°37′19″N 087°24′54″W
- Website: www.clarksvilleairport.com

Map
- Location of airport in Tennessee Outlaw Field (the United States)

Runways
Direction	Length		Surface
Direction	ft	m	Surface
17/35	5,999	1,828	Asphalt
5/23	4,004	1,220	Asphalt

Statistics (2020)
- Aircraft operations (year ending 7/1/2020): 32,475
- Based aircraft: 86
- Sources: airport website and FAA

Clarksville–Montgomery County Regional Airport (IATA: CKV, ICAO: KCKV, FAA LID: CKV) (John F. Outlaw Field), or simply Outlaw Field, is seven miles northwest of Clarksville, in Montgomery County, Tennessee, United States. It is owned by the city of Clarksville and Montgomery County and is near Fort Campbell.

== History ==
It opened in 1937 as a private airport. It was taken over by the United States Army Air Corps during World War II and became known as Clarksville Army Airfield. It was established as a sub-base for the larger Campbell Army Airfield in Fort Campbell, Kentucky, and was activated on 1 June 1942 as a primary basic flying training (level 1) airfield. It conducted flying training until inactivated on 31 October 1945. It remained inactive until transferred to USAF Tactical Air Command on 31 March 1946 and remained under USAF control until 1959 when the Air Force turned over all airport facilities to the United States Army.

In 1960 it returned to public airport status.

Ozark Airlines provided commercial air service to Clarksville from 1955 through 1979. Flights were flown to Nashville and St. Louis, the latter with stops en route.

Southern Airways briefly served Clarksville in 1962 with flights to Nashville and Memphis, the latter with two stops en route.

Air Kentucky then served Clarksville from 1980 through 1985. In 1981 Air Kentucky became Allegheny Commuter, a code-share feeder carrier for USAir. Service was provided to Nashville and Louisville.

Express Airlines II, operating as Northwest Airlink, briefly served Clarksville in late 1987/early 1988 with one-stop flights to Memphis.

Commuter airline Prime Air was the final carrier at Clarksville from 1985 through 1989, initially with flights to Nashville followed by one-stop flights to St. Louis.

== Facilities ==
Outlaw Field covers 452 acres (183 ha) at an elevation of 550 feet (168 m). It has two asphalt runways: 17/35 is 5,999 by 100 feet (1,828 x 30 m) and 5/23 is 4,004 by 100 feet.

For the 12-month period ending July 1, 2020, the airport had 32,475 aircraft operations, average 89 per day: 80% general aviation, 17% military and 3% air taxi. 86 aircraft were then based at the airport: 75 single-engine, 5 multi-engine, 1 jet and 5 helicopter.

In 2017, a $12.9 million modernization project began. It included the reconstruction of Runway 17-35 and the parallel taxiway, modernization of the airfield lighting and NAVAIDS, and improvement of drainage features. The modernization project was completed in 2019 and allows for heavier aircraft to utilize the airport.

== Future ==
The terminal was reconstructed in 2011; groundbreaking was on December 17, 2010. The terminal was fully reconstructed by spring 2012.

== See also ==
- List of airports in Tennessee
- Tennessee World War II Army Airfields
