= PVE =

PVE, pve, or PvE may refer to:

== Places ==
- Beech River Regional Airport, Henderson County, Tennessee, United States
- Palos Verdes Estates, California
- Prairie Vista Elementary School, Granger, Indiana, United States

== Science, technology, and medicine ==
- Portal vein embolization, a preoperative procedure before resection of another portion of the liver
- Prosthetic valve endocarditis, a type of endocarditis
- Proxmox Virtual Environment, an open-source software server for virtualization management
- Partial volume effect: Partial volume (imaging)
- Preventing violent extremism: Violent extremism § Prevention of radicalization and deradicalization
- Pneumatic vacuum elevator, pneumatic tube transport

== Entertainment ==
- Player versus environment, a category of video games

== Organizations ==
- Ecologist Green Party of Mexico (Spanish: Partido Verde Ecologista de México)
