= HZD =

HZD may refer to:

- Carroll County Airport (Tennessee) (FAA LID: HZD), a county-owned, public-use airport in Carroll County, Tennessee
- Hazaribagh Road railway station (station code: HZD), a railway station on the Grand Chord line of East Central Railway
- Movement for Democracy (Slovak: Hnutie za demokraciu), a political party in Slovakia
- Horizon Zero Dawn, a video game released in 2017
