= Tennessee Museum of Aviation =

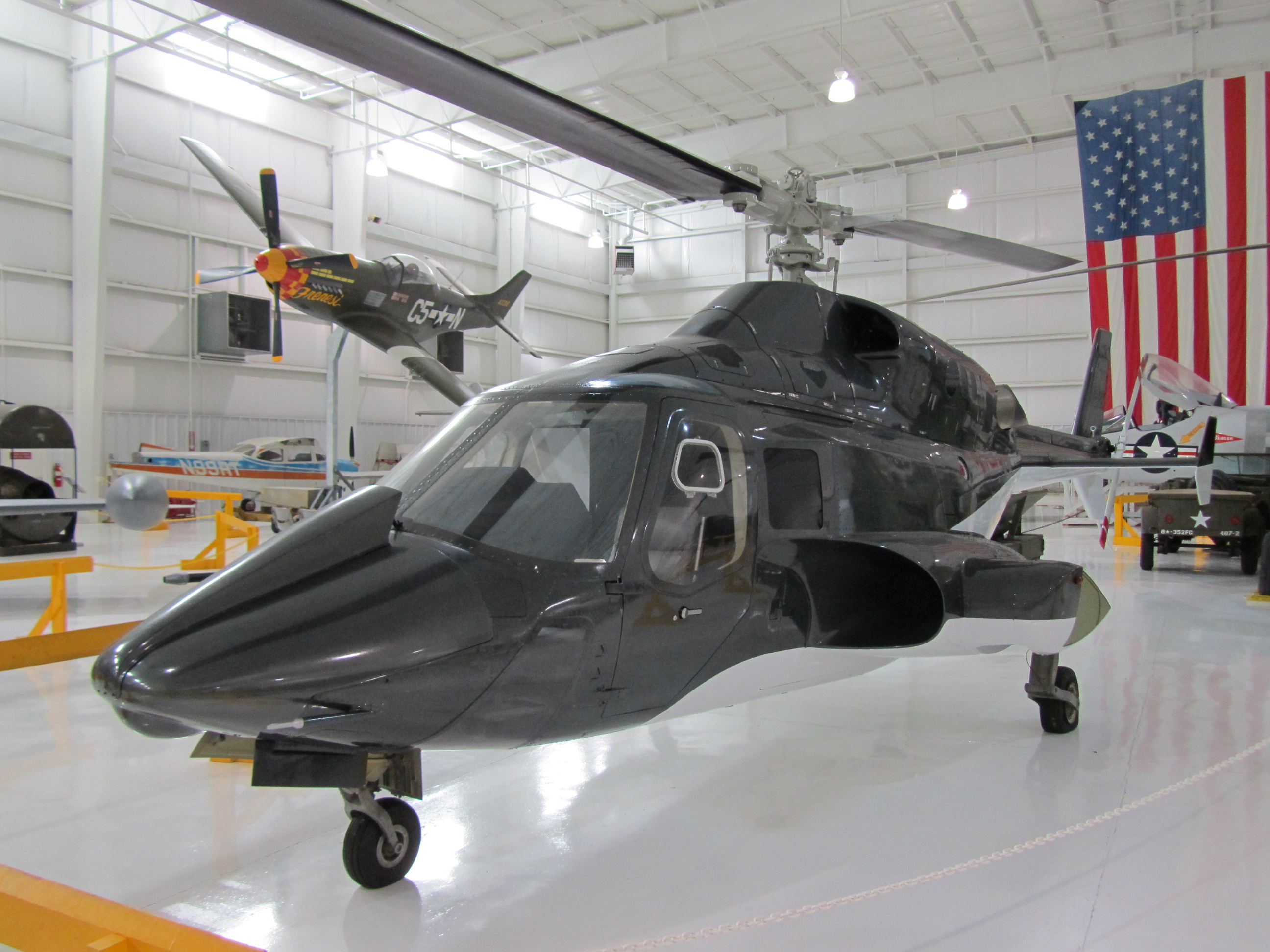
- Replica of helicopter from Airwolf

- Location within Tennessee
- Established: 1999
- Location: Sevierville, Tennessee
- Coordinates: 35.860°N 83.535°W
- Type: Aviation museum
- Founders: R. Neal Melton; Bob Minter
- Website: www.tnairmuseum.com

The Tennessee Museum of Aviation is an aviation museum located at the Gatlinburg–Pigeon Forge Airport in Sevierville, Tennessee.

== History ==
=== Background ===
The Tennessee Aviation Hall of Fame was founded by Bob Minter in 1996. Separately, three years later, R. Neal Melton began construction of Tennessee Museum of Aviation at the Gatlinburg–Pigeon Forge Airport. The two organizations merged shortly thereafter.

=== Establishment ===
The combined museum opened in a 50,000 sq ft (4,600 m^{2}) facility on 15 December 2001. (Note: Only 35,000 sq ft (3,300 m^{2}) of the building is hangar space.)

=== Move to Lebanon ===
In April 2025, the museum received approval to move to Lebanon Municipal Airport in Lebanon, Tennessee, where a new facility will be built.

== Exhibits ==
Exhibits at the museum include a history of military chaplains and a timeline of aviation history.

== Collection ==
The majority of the museum's aircraft are on loan.

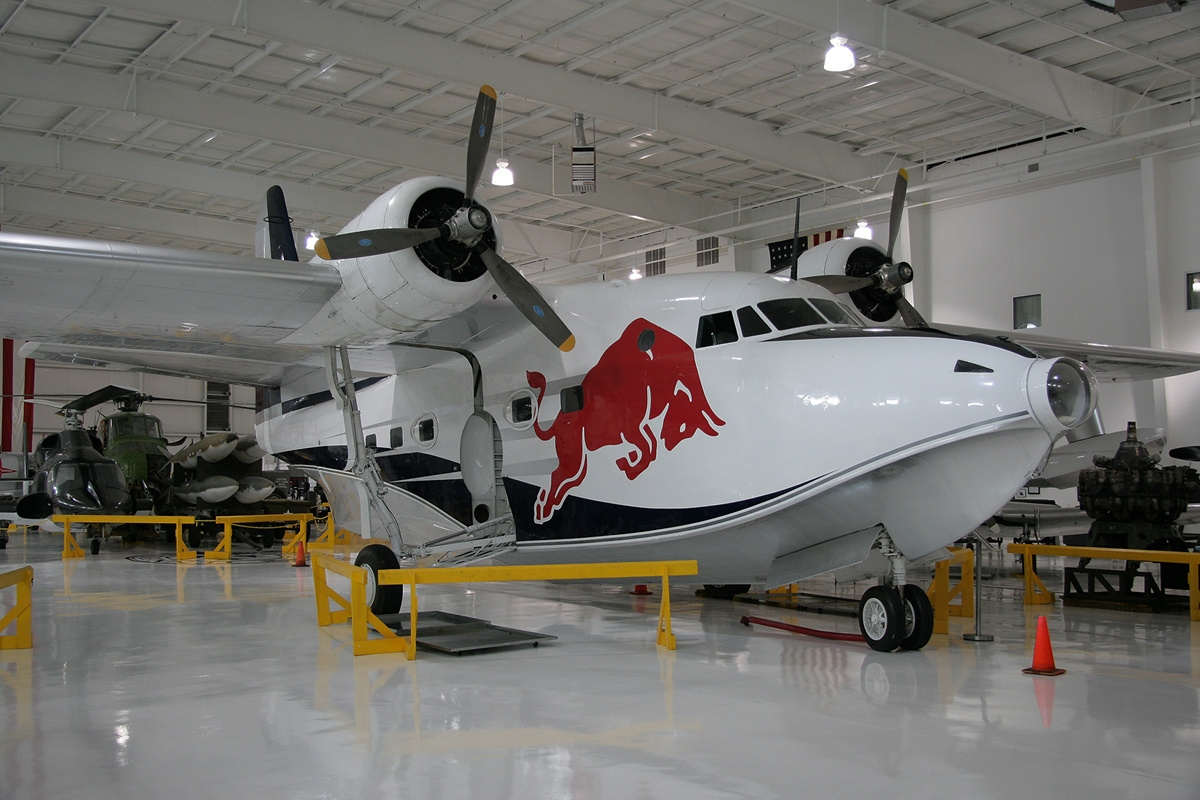
Grumman HU-16E Albatross

=== Aircraft ===
- 1902 Wright glider
- Beechcraft Model 18 – fuselage
- Beechcraft RC-45J Expeditor
- Beechcraft T-34B Mentor
- Canadair CT-133 Silver Star
- Cessna P172D Skyhawk
- Cessna O-1A Bird Dog
- Dornier Do 27 B-1
- Douglas A-1H Skyraider
- Douglas A-4 Skyhawk – cockpit
- Grumman HU-16E Albatross
- LTV A-7A Corsair II
- Mikoyan-Gurevich MiG-21US
- North American B-25 Mitchell – forward fuselage
- North American P-51D Mustang – replica
- North American T-28B Trojan
- North American Rockwell OV-10D Bronco
- Republic P-47D Thunderbolt
- Republic P-47D Thunderbolt
- Sikorsky UH-34G
- WSK-Mielec Lim-5
- WSK-Mielec Lim-5R

=== Other ===
- Gnome Monosoupape 9 Type B
- Link C-11 trainer

== See also ==
- List of aviation museums
