= Ellington Airport (Tennessee) =

- IATA: none; ICAO: KLUG; FAA LID: LUG

Summary
- Airport type: Public
- Owner: City of Lewisburg
- Serves: Lewisburg, Tennessee
- Elevation AMSL: 717 ft (219 m)
- Coordinates: 35°30′25″N 086°48′14″W

Map
- Location of airport in Tennessee KLUG (the United States)

Runways
Direction	Length		Surface
Direction	ft	m	Surface
2/20	5,002	1,525	Asphalt

Statistics (1998)
- Aircraft operations: 17,050
- Based aircraft: 33
- Source: Federal Aviation Administration

Ellington Airport (ICAO: KLUG, FAA LID: LUG) is a city-owned public-use airport located three miles (5 km) north of the central business district of Lewisburg, a city in Marshall County, Tennessee, United States.

Although most U.S. airports use the same three-letter location identifier for the FAA and IATA, Ellington Airport is assigned LUG by the FAA but has no designation from the IATA (which assigned LUG to Agno Airport in Lugano, Switzerland).

== Facilities and aircraft ==
Ellington Airport covers an area of 200 acres (81 ha) and contains one asphalt paved runway designated 2/20 which measures 5,002 x 75 ft (1,525 x 23 m). For the 12-month period ending July 23, 1998, the airport had 17,050 aircraft operations, an average of 46 per day: 91% general aviation, 9% air taxi and <1% military. At that time there were 33 aircraft based at this airport: 79% single-engine, 18% multi-engine and 3% ultralight.

== See also ==
- List of airports in Tennessee
