= Benton County Airport =

Airport in Benton County, Tennessee

- IATA: none; ICAO: none; FAA LID: 0M4

Summary
- Airport type: Public
- Owner: Benton County
- Serves: Camden, Tennessee
- Elevation AMSL: 468 ft (143 m)
- Coordinates: 36°00′14″N 088°07′46″W

Map
- Location of airport in Tennessee 0M4 (the United States)

Runways
Direction	Length		Surface
Direction	ft	m	Surface
04/22	5,001	1,524	Asphalt

Statistics (2017)
- Aircraft operations: 4,040
- Based aircraft: 30
- Source: Federal Aviation Administration

Benton County Airport (FAA LID: 0M4) is a county-owned public-use airport located three nautical miles (4.8 km) south of the central business district of Camden, a city in Benton County, Tennessee, United States. This airport is included in the National Plan of Integrated Airport Systems for 2011–2015, which categorized it as a general aviation airport.

== Facilities and aircraft ==
Benton County Airport covers an area of 167 acres (68 ha) at an elevation of 468 feet (142 m) above mean sea level. It has one runway: 04/22 is 5,001 by 75 feet (1,524 x 23 m) with an asphalt pavement.

For the 12-month period ending December 31, 2017, the airport had 4,040 aircraft operations, an average of 77 per week: 99% general aviation, and 1% military. At that time there were 30 aircraft based at this airport: 24 single-engine, and 6 multi-engine.

== See also ==
- List of airports in Tennessee
