= Puckett Gliderport =

- IATA: none; ICAO: none; FAA LID: 50M

Summary
- Airport type: Public
- Owner: Benton and Janice Poore, Jr.
- Serves: Eagleville, Tennessee
- Elevation AMSL: 780 ft / 238 m
- Coordinates: 35°41′22″N 086°36′54″W

Map
- Location of airport in Tennessee 50M (the United States)

Runways
Direction	Length		Surface
Direction	ft	m	Surface
14/32	2,200	671	Turf

Statistics (2021)
- Aircraft operations (year ending 6/30/2021): 1,100
- Based aircraft: 4
- Source: Federal Aviation Administration

Puckett Gliderport (FAA LID: 50M) is a privately owned public-use glider airport in Bedford County, Tennessee, United States. It is located four nautical miles (5 mi, 7 km) southeast of the central business district of Eagleville, Tennessee.

== Facilities and aircraft ==
Puckett Gliderport covers an area of 15 acres (6 ha) at an elevation of 780 feet (238 m) above mean sea level. It has one runway designated 14/32 with a turf surface measuring 2,200 by 145 feet (671 x 44 m).

For the 12-month period ending June 30, 2021, the airport had 1,100 general aviation aircraft operations, an average of 21 per week. At that time there were 4 aircraft based at this airport: all single-engine.

== See also ==
- List of airports in Tennessee
