= Johnson City STOLport =

- IATA: none; ICAO: none; FAA LID: 0A4

Summary
- Airport type: Public
- Owner: George W. St. John, heirs
- Serves: Johnson City, Tennessee
- Elevation AMSL: 1,550 ft (470 m)
- Coordinates: 36°21′49″N 082°18′32″W

Map
- Location of airport in Tennessee 0A4 (the United States)

Runways
| Direction | Length | | Surface |
| Direction | ft | m | Surface |
|---|---|---|---|
| 4/22 | 3,000 | 914 | Asphalt |

Statistics (2018)
- Aircraft operations: 7,700
- Based aircraft: 18
- Source: Federal Aviation Administration

Johnson City STOLport (FAA LID: 0A4) is a privately owned, public use STOLport in Washington County, Tennessee, United States. It is located three nautical miles (6 km) northeast of the central business district of Johnson City, Tennessee. This facility has a runway designed for use by STOL (short take-off and landing) aircraft.

== Facilities and aircraft ==
Johnson City STOLport covers an area of 45 acres (18 ha) at an elevation of 1,550 feet (472 m) above mean sea level. It has one runway designated 4/22 with an asphalt surface measuring 3,000 by 50 feet (914 x 15 m).

For the 12-month period ending December 31, 2018 the airport had 7,700 general aviation aircraft operations, an average of 21 per day. There were 18 aircraft based at the airport: 14 single-engine, and 4 multi-engine.

== See also ==
- List of airports in Tennessee
