= McMinn County Airport =

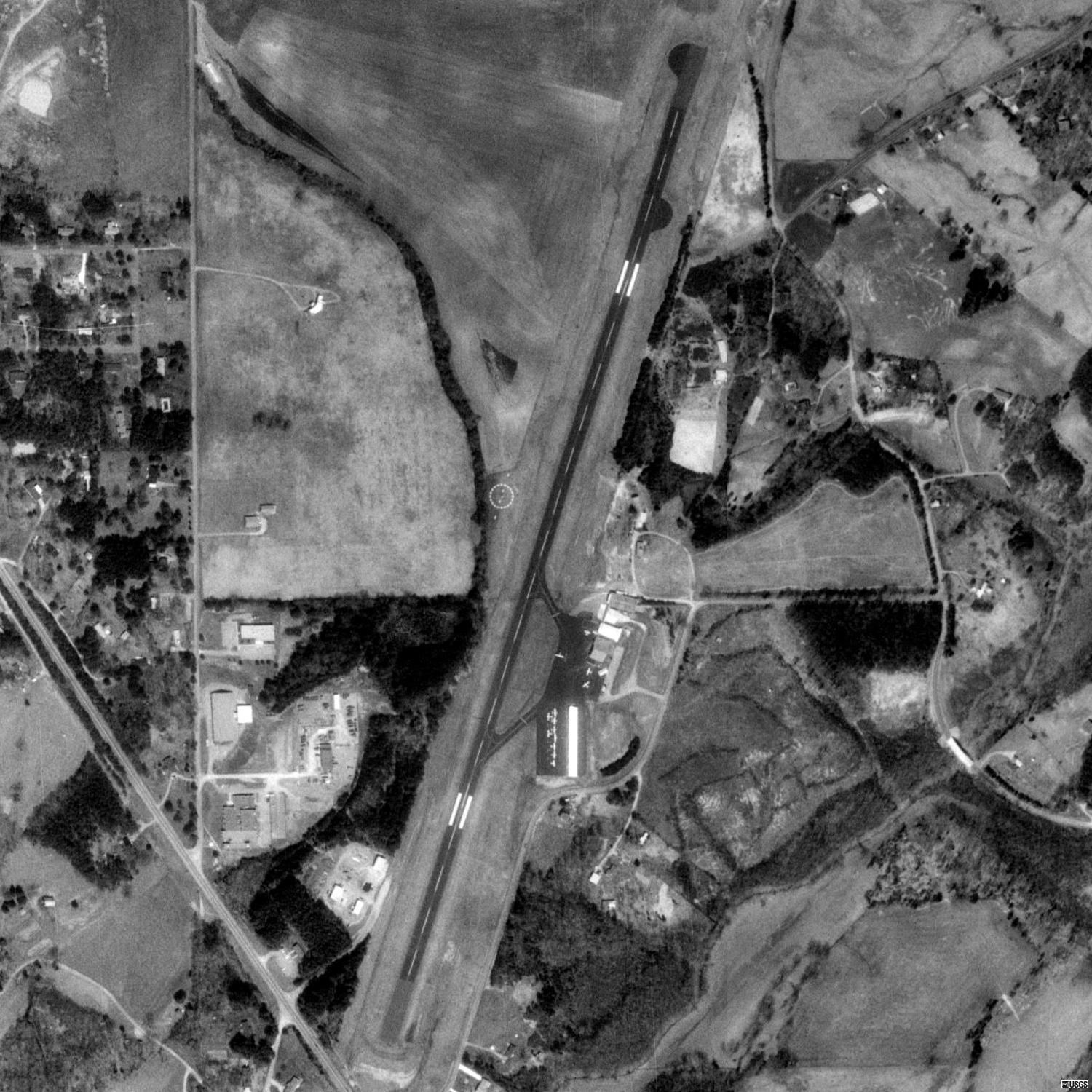
- IATA: MMI; ICAO: KMMI; FAA LID: MMI

Summary
- Airport type: Public
- Owner: McMinn County
- Serves: Athens, Tennessee
- Elevation AMSL: 858 ft / 262 m
- Coordinates: 35°23′50″N 084°33′45″W

Map
- Location of airport in Tennessee MMI (the United States)

Runways
Direction	Length		Surface
Direction	ft	m	Surface
2/20	6,450	1,966	Asphalt

Statistics (2023)
- Aircraft operations (year ending 6/22/2023): 22,575
- Based aircraft: 39
- Source: Federal Aviation Administration

McMinn County Airport (IATA: MMI, ICAO: KMMI, FAA LID: MMI) is a county-owned, public-use airport located three nautical miles (6 km) southeast of the central business district of Athens, a city in McMinn County, Tennessee, United States.

== Facilities and aircraft ==
McMinn County Airport covers an area of 210 acres (85 ha) at an elevation of 874 feet (266 m) above mean sea level. It has one runway designated 2/20 with a 6,450 by 100 ft (1,966 x 30 m) asphalt surface.

For the 12-month period ending June 22, 2023, the airport had 22,575 aircraft operations, an average of 62 per day: 93% general aviation, 7% air taxi and <1% military. At that time there were 39 aircraft based at this airport: 35 single-engine, 2 multi-engine, 1 jet, and 1 helicopter.

The fixed-base operator at McMinn County airport is Athens Air, LLC.

The airport is attended from 0830 to dusk and has 100LL aviation fuel and Jet A. It is included under the Nashville FSS. It has medium intensity runway lighting, REIL on Runway 02, and VASI on both runways. NOTAMs are filed with Nashville International Airport.

== See also ==
- List of airports in Tennessee
