= Covington Municipal Airport (Tennessee) =

Airport in Tennessee, United States

- IATA: none; ICAO: none; FAA LID: M04

Summary
- Airport type: Public
- Owner: City of Covington
- Serves: Covington, Tennessee
- Elevation AMSL: 280 ft (85 m)
- Coordinates: 35°35′00″N 089°35′14″W

Map
- Location of airport in Tennessee M04 (the United States)

Runways
Direction	Length		Surface
Direction	ft	m	Surface
1/19	5,004	1,525	Asphalt

Statistics (2019)
- Aircraft operations (year ending 8/31/2019): 13,000
- Based aircraft: 31
- Source: Federal Aviation Administration

Covington Municipal Airport (FAA LID: M04) is a city-owned public-use airport located three miles (5 km) northeast of the central business district of Covington, a city in Tipton County, Tennessee, United States.

== Facilities and aircraft ==
Covington Municipal Airport covers an area of 569 acres (230 ha) and contains one asphalt paved runway designated 1/19 which measures 5,004 x 100 ft (1,525 x 30 m). For the 12-month period ending August 31, 2019, the airport had 13,000 aircraft operations, an average of 36 per day: 96% general aviation, 4% air taxi and <1% military. At that time there were 31 aircraft based at this airport: 29 single-engine, 1 multi-engine, and 1 jet.

== See also ==
- List of airports in Tennessee
