= Humphreys County Airport =

Airport in Tennessee, United States

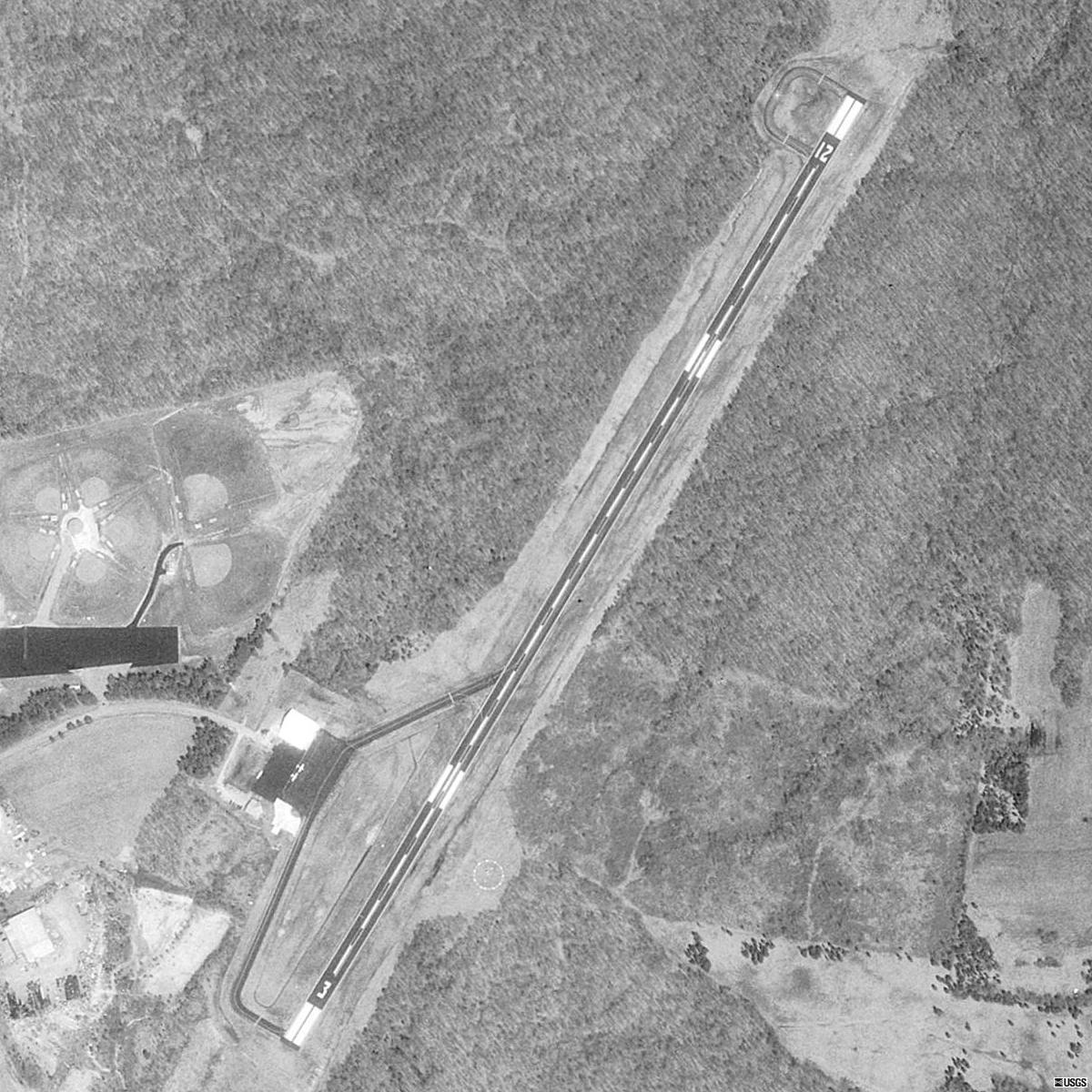
- USGS aerial photo as of 1 April 1998
- IATA: none; ICAO: none; FAA LID: 0M5

Summary
- Airport type: Public
- Owner: Humphreys County
- Serves: Waverly, Tennessee
- Elevation AMSL: 756 ft (230 m)
- Coordinates: 36°7′0″N 87°44′17″W

Map
- Location within Tennessee Location within the United States

Runways
Direction	Length		Surface
Direction	ft	m	Surface
3/21	4,000	1,219	Asphalt

Statistics (2020)
- Aircraft operations (year ending July 31, 2020): 6,260
- Based aircraft: 14
- Source: Federal Aviation Administration

Humphreys County Airport (FAA LID: 0M5) is a county-owned public-use airport located three nautical miles (6 km) northeast of the central business district of Waverly, a city in Humphreys County, Tennessee, United States.

== Facilities and aircraft ==
Humphreys County Airport covers an area of 160 acres (65 ha) at an elevation of 756 feet (230 m) above mean sea level. It has one asphalt paved runway designated 3/21 which measures 4,000 by 75 feet (1,219 x 23 m).

For the 12-month period ending July 31, 2020, the airport had 6,260 aircraft operations, an average of 120 per week: 98% general aviation, 2% military, and <1% air taxi. At that time there were 14 aircraft based at this airport: 12 single-engine, 1 multi-engine and 1 jet.

== See also ==
- List of airports in Tennessee
