= Hawkins County Airport =

- IATA: none; ICAO: KRVN; FAA LID: RVN

Summary
- Airport type: Public
- Owner: Hawkins County
- Serves: Hawkins County, Tennessee
- Location: Surgoinsville, Tennessee
- Elevation AMSL: 1,255 ft (383 m)
- Coordinates: 36°27′27″N 082°53′06″W

Map
- Location of airport in Tennessee RVN (the United States)

Runways
Direction	Length		Surface
Direction	ft	m	Surface
7/25	3,504	1,068	Asphalt

Statistics (2021)
- Aircraft operations (year ending 7/27/2021): 1,000
- Based aircraft: 20
- Source: Federal Aviation Administration

Hawkins County Airport (ICAO: KRVN, FAA LID: RVN) is a county-owned public-use airport in Hawkins County, Tennessee, United States. It is located six nautical miles (7 mi, 11 km) northeast of the central business district of Rogersville, Tennessee in the city of Surgoinsville, Tennessee. This airport is included in the National Plan of Integrated Airport Systems for 2011–2015, which categorized it as a general aviation facility.

Although most U.S. airports use the same three-letter location identifier for the FAA and IATA, this airport is assigned RVN by the FAA, but has no designation from the IATA (which assigned RVN to Rovaniemi Airport in Finland).

== Facilities and aircraft ==
Hawkins County Airport covers an area of 56 acres (23 ha) at an elevation of 1,255 feet (383 m) above mean sea level. It has one runway designated 7/25 with an asphalt surface measuring 3,504 by 75 feet (1,068 x 23 m).

For the 12-month period ending July 27, 2021, the airport had 1,000 aircraft operations, an average of 83 per month: 99% general aviation, 1% air taxi, and <1% military. At that time there were 20 aircraft based at this airport: all single-engine.

== See also ==
- List of airports in Tennessee
