= Livingston Municipal Airport (Tennessee) =

Airport in Overton County, Tennessee

- IATA: none; ICAO: none; FAA LID: 8A3

Summary
- Airport type: Public
- Owner: City of Livingston
- Serves: Livingston, Tennessee
- Elevation AMSL: 1,372 ft / 418 m
- Coordinates: 36°24′44″N 085°18′42″W

Map
- Location of airport in Tennessee 8A3 (the United States)

Runways
| Direction | Length | | Surface |
| Direction | ft | m | Surface |
|---|---|---|---|
| 3/21 | 5,152 | 1,570 | Asphalt |

Statistics (1999)
- Aircraft operations: 10,570
- Based aircraft: 14
- Source: Federal Aviation Administration

Livingston Municipal Airport (FAA LID: 8A3) is a city-owned public-use airport located two miles (3 km) northeast of the central business district of Livingston, a city in Overton County, Tennessee, United States.

== Facilities and aircraft ==
Livingston Municipal Airport covers an area of 44 acres (18 ha) and contains one runway designated 3/21 which measures 5,152 x 75 ft (1,570 x 23 m). For the 12-month period ending February 26, 1999, the airport had 10,570 aircraft operations, an average of 28 per day: 99.6% general aviation and 0.4% military. At that time there were 14 aircraft based at this airport: 93% single-engine and 7% multi-engine.

== See also ==
- List of airports in Tennessee
