= Music City Executive Airport =

Airport in Tennessee, United States

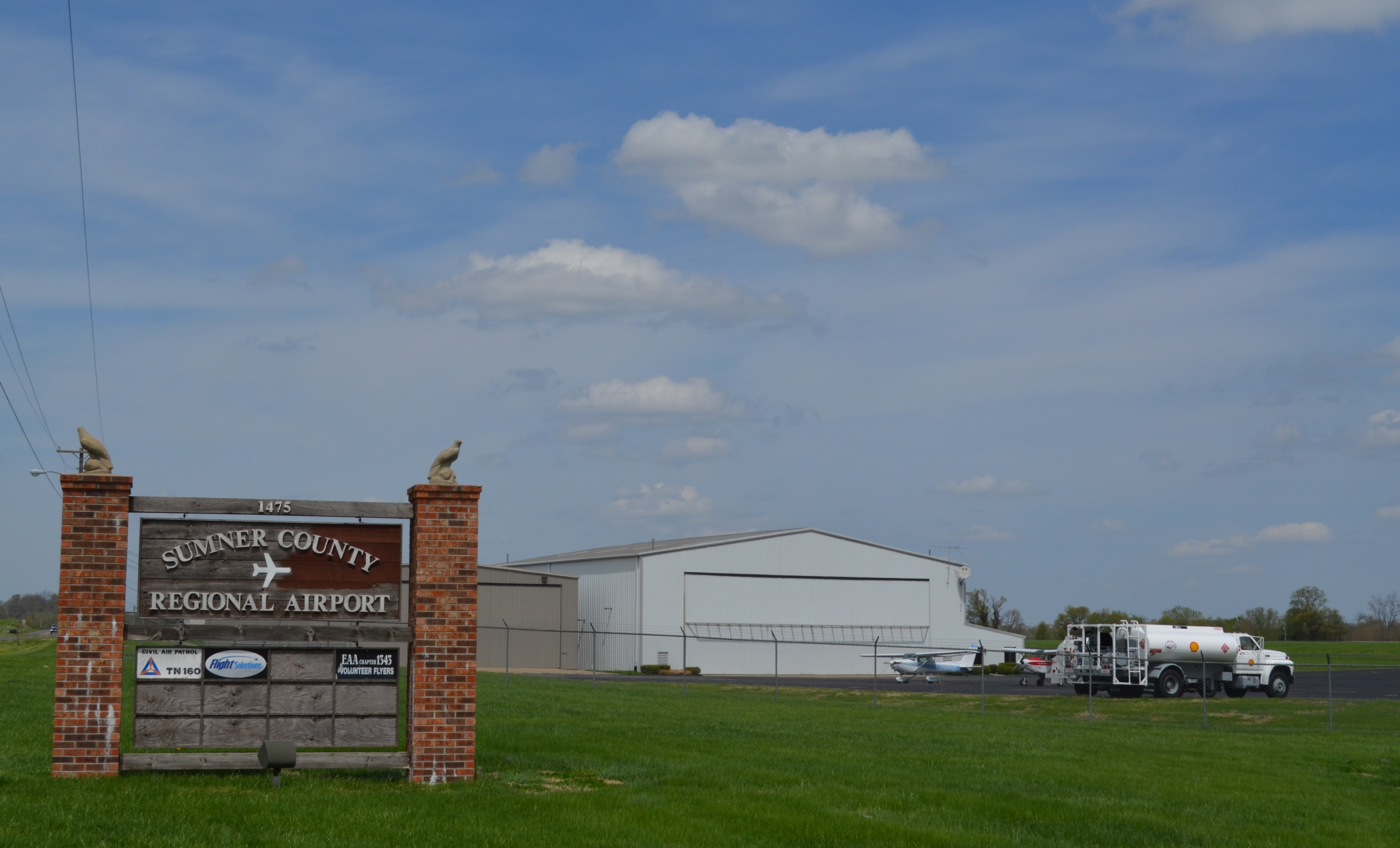
- Front entrance to airport
- IATA: none; ICAO: KXNX; FAA LID: XNX

Summary
- Airport type: Public
- Owner: Music City Executive Airport Authority
- Serves: Gallatin, Tennessee
- Elevation AMSL: 583 ft / 177 m
- Coordinates: 36°22′36″N 086°24′31″W

Map
- Location of airport in Tennessee XNX (the United States)

Runways
Direction	Length		Surface
Direction	ft	m	Surface
17/35	6,300	1,920	Asphalt

Statistics (2012)
- Aircraft operations: 33,750
- Based aircraft: 59
- Source: Federal Aviation Administration

Music City Executive Airport (ICAO: KXNX, FAA LID: XNX) is a publicly owned public-use airport located two nautical miles (4 km) east of the central business district of Gallatin, a city in Sumner County, Tennessee, United States. The airport previously had the designation M33 prior to being changed to XNX. The airport was named Sumner County Regional Airport prior to June 2019. This airport is included in the National Plan of Integrated Airport Systems for 2011 to 2015, which categorized it as a general aviation airport.

== Facilities and aircraft ==
Music City Executive Airport covers an area of 332 acres (134 ha) inside the city limits of Gallatin at an elevation of 583 feet (179 m) above mean sea level. It has one runway: 17/35 is 6,300 by 100 feet (1,920 x 30 m) with an asphalt pavement.

For the 12-month period ending December 31, 2017, the airport had 33,750 aircraft operations, an average of 92 per day: 96% general aviation, 4% air taxi, and <1% military. At that time there were 77 aircraft based at this airport: 75% single-engine, 12% multi-engine, 8% jet, and <1% helicopter.

== See also ==
- List of airports in Tennessee
