= Campbell County Airport (Tennessee) =

- IATA: none; ICAO: KJAU; FAA LID: JAU

Summary
- Airport type: Public
- Owner: Campbell County
- Serves: Campbell County, Tennessee
- Location: Jacksboro, Tennessee vicinity
- Elevation AMSL: 1,180 ft (360 m)
- Coordinates: 36°20′03″N 084°09′47″W

Map
- Location of airport in Tennessee KJAU (the United States)

Runways
Direction	Length		Surface
Direction	ft	m	Surface
5/23	4,000	1,219	Asphalt

Statistics (2009)
- Aircraft operations: 4,720
- Based aircraft: 10
- Source: Federal Aviation Administration

Campbell County Airport (ICAO: KJAU, FAA LID: JAU) is a county-owned, public-use airport located 1 kilometre (0.62 mi) east of the central business district of Jacksboro, a town in Campbell County, Tennessee, United States. This airport is included in the FAA's National Plan of Integrated Airport Systems for 2011–2015, which categorized it as a general aviation facility.

Although most U.S. airports use the same three-letter location identifier for the FAA and IATA, this airport is assigned JAU by the FAA but has no designation from the IATA (which assigned JAU to Jauja, Peru).

== Facilities and aircraft ==
Campbell County Airport covers an area of 84 acres (34 ha) just to the east of Jacksboro at an elevation of 1,180 feet (360 m) above mean sea level. It has one runway designated 5/23 with an asphalt surface measuring 4,000 by 75 feet (1,219 x 23 m).

For the 12-month period ending June 30, 2009, the airport had 4,720 aircraft operations, an average of 12 per day: 99.6% general aviation and 0.4% military. At that time there were 10 single-engine aircraft based at this airport.

== See also ==
- List of airports in Tennessee
