= Warren County Memorial Airport =

- IATA: RNC; ICAO: KRNC; FAA LID: RNC

Summary
- Airport type: Public
- Owner: Warren County
- Serves: Warren County, Tennessee
- Location: McMinnville, Tennessee
- Elevation AMSL: 1,032 ft / 315 m
- Coordinates: 35°41′55″N 085°50′38″W
- Website: WarrenCountyMemorialAirport.com

Map
- Location of airport in Tennessee RNC (the United States)

Runways
Direction	Length		Surface
Direction	ft	m	Surface
5/23	5,000	1,524	Asphalt

Statistics (2009)
- Aircraft operations: 20,299
- Based aircraft: 54
- Source: Federal Aviation Administration

Warren County Memorial Airport (IATA: RNC, ICAO: KRNC, FAA LID: RNC) is a county-owned public-use airport in Warren County, Tennessee, United States. It is located three nautical miles (6 km) west of the central business district of McMinnville, Tennessee. This airport is included in the National Plan of Integrated Airport Systems for 2011–2015, which categorized it as a general aviation facility.

== Facilities and aircraft ==
Warren County Memorial Airport covers an area of 353 acres (143 ha) at an elevation of 1,032 feet (315 m) above mean sea level. It has one runway designated 5/23 with an asphalt surface measuring 5,000 by 100 feet (1,524 x 30 m).

For the 12-month period ending April 8, 2009, the airport had 20,299 aircraft operations, an average of 55 per day: 89.5% general aviation, 10.2% air taxi, and 0.3% military. At that time there were 54 aircraft based at this airport: 85.2% single-engine, 3.7% multi-engine, 5.6% helicopter, and 5.6% ultralight.

== See also ==
- List of airports in Tennessee
