= Tennessee World War II Army Airfields =

Tennessee World War II Army Airfields
- Part of World War II

Site information
- Type: Army Airfields

Site history
- Built: 1940-1944
- In use: 1940-present

During World War II, the United States Army Air Forces (USAAF) established numerous airfields in Tennessee for training pilots and aircrews of USAAF fighters and bombers.

Most of these airfields were under the command of Third Air Force or the Army Air Forces Training Command (AAFTC) (A predecessor of the current-day United States Air Force Air Education and Training Command). However the other USAAF support commands (Air Technical Service Command (ATSC); Air Transport Command (ATC) or Troop Carrier Command) commanded a significant number of airfields in a support roles.

It is still possible to find remnants of these wartime airfields. Many were converted into municipal airports, some were returned to agriculture and several were retained as United States Air Force installations and were front-line bases during the Cold War. Hundreds of the temporary buildings that were used survive today, and are being used for other purposes.

== Major Airfields ==
Army Air Force Training Command
AAF Southeast Training Center

- Nashville AAC, Nashville (Non-Flying Facility)

Aviation Cadet Classification Center
526th Army Air Force Base Unit

Eastern Flying Training Command

- Smyrna AAF, Smyrna, Tennessee

313th Army Air Force Base Unit
Was: Sewart AAF until 1947, then Sewart Air Force Base (1947-1971)
Now: Smyrna Airport and Army Aviation Support Facility #1, Tennessee Army National Guard

William Northern Field, Tullahoma
Sub-base of Smyrna AAF
343d Army Air Force Base Unit
Now: Tullahoma Regional Airport

Air Transport Command

- Memphis AAF, Memphis

4th Ferrying Group
Joint use USAAF/Civil Airport/US Navy
346th Army Air Force Base Unit
Now: Memphis International Airport and Memphis Air National Guard Base

- Berry Field/Nashville Municipal Airport, Nashville, Tennessee

20th Ferrying Group
Joint use USAAF/Civil Airport
508th Army Air Force Base Unit
Now Nashville International Airport and Berry Field Air National Guard Base

Third Air Force

- Dyersburg Army Air Base, Halls, Tennessee

B-17/B-24 Pilot training facility
346th Bombardment Group, Very Heavy
419th Army Air Force Base Unit
451st Bombardment Group, Heavy
Reopened as Arnold Field (Tennessee)
