= Collegedale Municipal Airport =

Airport in Tennessee, United States

Collegedale Municipal Airport Linn Field
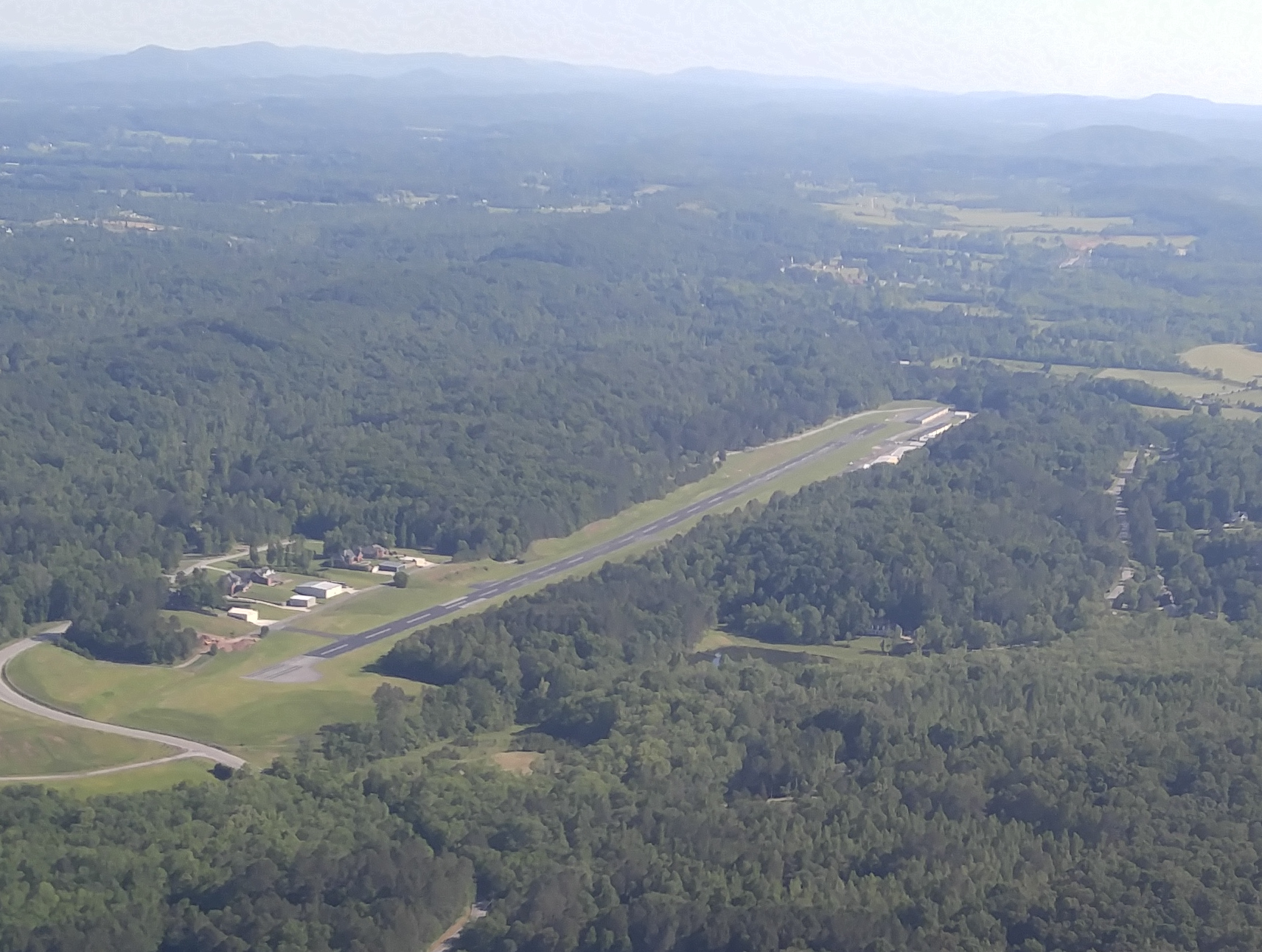
- A view of the airport heading 210
- IATA: none; ICAO: KFGU; FAA LID: FGU

Summary
- Airport type: Public
- Owner: City of Collegedale
- Serves: Collegedale, Tennessee
- Elevation AMSL: 860 ft (260 m)
- Coordinates: 35°02′35″N 085°01′19″W
- Website: www.collegedaletn.gov/index.aspx?NID=134

Map
- Location of airport in Tennessee FGU (the United States)

Runways
Direction	Length		Surface
Direction	ft	m	Surface
3/21	5,003	1,525	Asphalt

Statistics (2011)
- Aircraft operations: 14,500
- Based aircraft: 101
- Source: Federal Aviation Administration

Collegedale Municipal Airport (ICAO: KFGU, FAA LID: FGU, formerly 3M3) is a city-owned, public-use airport located two nautical miles (4 km) southeast of the central business district of the Collegedale, a city in Hamilton County, Tennessee, United States.

Collegedale Municipal is one of the busiest general aviation airports in the state of Tennessee with an average of 120 aircraft stationed there. It won the Tennessee Aeronautics Commission's "Airport of the Year" award in 2003. The airport does not provide scheduled commercial service. However, charter service is provided by Aviation Specialists, Inc., a private company located at the airport, that offers flight instruction and a banner towing operation.

This airport is assigned a three-letter location identifier of FGU by the Federal Aviation Administration, but it does not have an International Air Transport Association (IATA) airport code (the IATA assigned FGU to Fangatau Airport in French Polynesia).

== History ==
Begun as a flying club in 1965 by pilot and mechanic John Linn and Ellsworth McKee—son of the founders of the McKee Foods Corporation, the Collegedale Airport was originally a 1,200-foot (370 m) grass strip on a farm. It was purchased by pilot-entrepreneur Aubrey Kinzer in 1969 and turned into a commercial venture with a flight school, rental aircraft, and aircraft maintenance. In 1972, the City of Collegedale obtained the property, and over the years the asphalt paved runway has been extended to 4,700 feet (1,400 m) from its nominal 3,500-foot (1,100 m) length and widened to 75 feet (23 m) with a parallel taxiway. In 1995, the airport was rededicated and renamed Linn Field in honor of John Linn. Renovations and additions to the terminal, lobby, and Fixed-Base Operations (FBO) office were completed in 2003.

== Facilities and aircraft ==
Collegedale Municipal Airport covers an area of 145 acres (59 ha) at an elevation of 860 feet (260 m) above mean sea level. It has one runway designated 3/21 with an asphalt surface measuring 5,003 by 75 feet (1,525 by 23 m).

For the 12-month period ending September 30, 2011, the airport had 14,500 aircraft operations, an average of 39 per day: 97% general aviation and 3% air taxi. At that time there were 101 aircraft based at this airport: 92% single-engine, 4% multi-engine, 2% helicopter, and 2% ultralight.

The airport offers rental and maintenance services and is open every day from 8:30 a.m. until 5:30 p.m, except for Thanks Giving, Christmas, a half day on Christmas Eve, and New Years Day.

Nearby airports with instrument approach procedures include:

- CHA – Lovell Field 9 nautical miles (17 kilometres) W
- HDI – Hardwick Field 14 nautical miles (26 kilometres) NE
- DNN – Dalton Municipal Airport 21 nautical miles (39 kilometres) S
- 9A5 – Barwick-LaFayette Airport 25 nautical miles (46 kilometres) SW
- 2A0 – Mark Anton Airport 27 nautical miles (50 kilometres) N

== See also ==
- List of airports in Tennessee
