= Portland Municipal Airport (Tennessee) =

- IATA: none; ICAO: none; FAA LID: 1M5

Summary
- Airport type: Public
- Owner: City of Portland
- Serves: Portland, Tennessee
- Elevation AMSL: 817 ft / 249 m
- Coordinates: 36°35′34″N 086°28′37″W

Map
- Location of airport in Tennessee 1M5 (the United States)

Runways
Direction	Length		Surface
Direction	ft	m	Surface
1/19	5,000	1,524	Asphalt

Statistics (2017)
- Aircraft operations: 12,700
- Based aircraft: 21
- Source: Federal Aviation Administration

Portland Municipal Airport (FAA LID: 1M5) is a city-owned, public-use airport located three nautical miles (6 km) northeast of the central business district of Portland, a city in Sumner County, Tennessee, United States. It is included in the National Plan of Integrated Airport Systems for 2011–2015, which categorized it as a general aviation facility.

== Facilities and aircraft ==
Portland Municipal Airport covers an area of 157 acres (64 ha) at an elevation of 817 feet (249 m) above mean sea level. It has one runway designated 1/19 with an asphalt surface measuring 5,000 by 100 feet (1,524 x 30 m).

For the 12-month period ending December 31, 2017, the airport had 12,700 aircraft operations, an average of 35 per day: 94% general aviation, 4% military, and 2% air taxi. At that time there were 21 aircraft based at this airport: 18 single-engine, 2 multi-engine, and 1 helicopter.

== See also ==
- List of airports in Tennessee
