= Port of Memphis =

Port in Tennessee, United States

- Interactive map of Port of Memphis
- Location in USA Tennessee

Location
- Location: Tennessee
- Coordinates: 35°06′05″N 90°05′49″W

Details
- President and CEO: Joann Massey

Statistics
- Annual cargo tonnage: 8.2 million short tons (2022)
- Website portofmemphis.com

The International Port of Memphis is an active port in Memphis, Tennessee, United States. It is mainly located on President's Island, which is a peninsula. However, it also extends between miles 725 and 740 on both the Tennessee and Arkansas sides of the Mississippi River.

It is the second largest inland port on the shallow draft portion of the Mississippi River, and the fifth largest inland port in the United States. It has the ability to connect to sea via the Mississippi River, by rail using any of the five Class 1 railroads in the city, by road via I-40 or I-55, and by air using FedEx.

== History ==
The first Port of Memphis grain elevator opened in 1937. It was constructed by the Public Works Administration and located in North Memphis on the Wolf River. The facility saw exponential growth of shipments in 1939 and 1940 due to the shift from cotton to corn among Arkansas farmers.

In 1946, the City of Memphis and Shelby County governments developed a concept for a new industrial area with river access that was separate from downtown, but close enough for commerce. The chosen location for this concept was President's Island. However, President's Island was a flood plain; this was resolved by the creation of a dam connecting the northern tip of the island to shore. A harbor was dredged on the slack water side of the island, with the materials retrieved from dredging being used to raise land along the bank to create an industrial park.

In 2019, the Port Commission was awarded a $1.7 million grant from the Tennessee Department of Transportation to expand the capacity of the rail yard. It signed a contract with Watco to operate the public terminal.

== Facilities ==
The Port of Memphis consists of three slack-water harbors and two industrial parks. It includes 18 liquid bulk and eight dry bulk facilities. The southern industrial park is home to an intermodal terminal shared by CN Railway and CSX Transportation. The port is also home to TVA's Allen Combined Cycle Plant and a Valero oil refinery.

== See also ==
- List of ports in the United States
