= Arnold Field (Tennessee) =

Airport in Halls, Tennessee, United States

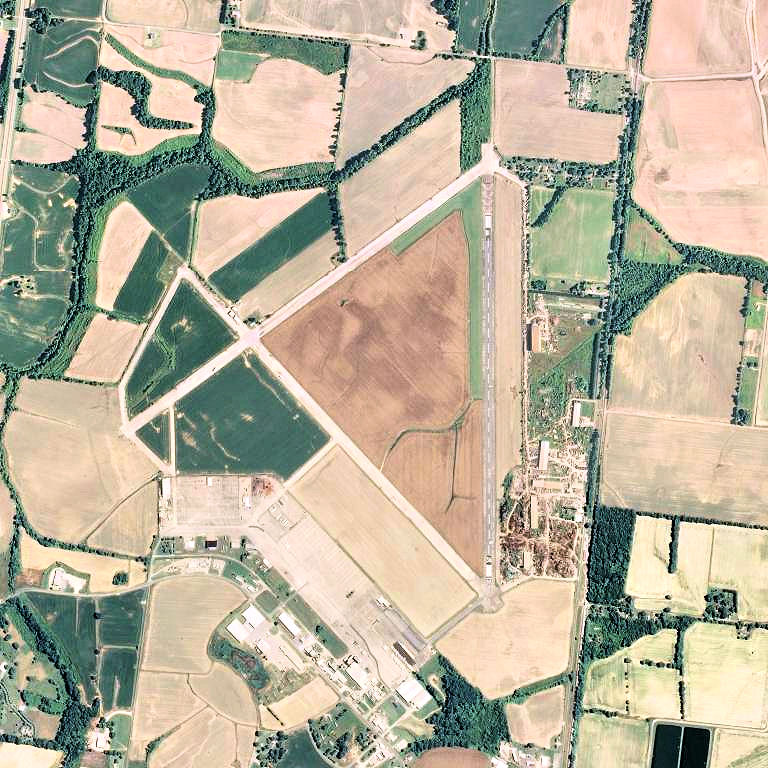
- 2006 USGS photo
- IATA: none; ICAO: none; FAA LID: M31

Summary
- Airport type: Public
- Owner: Town of Halls
- Serves: Halls, Tennessee
- Elevation AMSL: 292 ft (89 m)
- Coordinates: 35°54′12″N 089°23′50″W

Map
- Location within Tennessee Location within the United States

Runways
Direction	Length		Surface
Direction	ft	m	Surface
18/36	4,700	1,433	Concrete

Statistics (2019)
- Aircraft operations (year ending 8/31/2019): 7,290
- Source: Federal Aviation Administration

For the World War II use of the airport, see Dyersburg Army Air Base

Arnold Field (FAA LID: M31) is a municipal public-use airport located two miles (3 km) northwest of the central business district of Halls, a town in Lauderdale County, Tennessee, United States. The airport is named for a former Mayor, Sammie Arnold

In 2007, Arnold Field is home to 15 general purpose aircraft and the Veterans' Museum.

== History ==
The airport is operated on the grounds of the former Dyersburg Army Air Base. In the 1940s the Dyersburg Army Air Base was a training facility for World War II B-17 Flying Fortress bomber pilots and crews.

== Facilities and aircraft ==
Arnold Field covers an area of 29 acres (12 ha) which contains one concrete paved runway (18/36) measuring 4,700 x 75 ft (1,433 x 23 m).

For the 12-month period ending August 31, 2019, the airport had 9,500 aircraft operations, an average of 26 per day: 95% general aviation and 5% military.

== Veterans' Museum ==
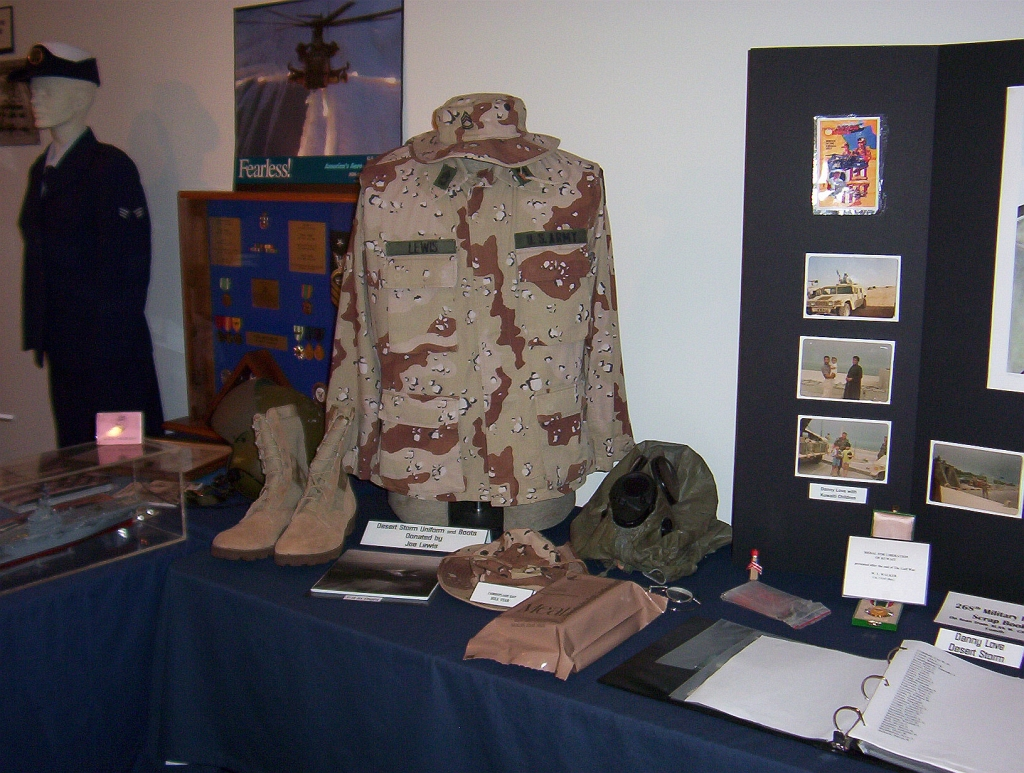
Uniform and document exhibits

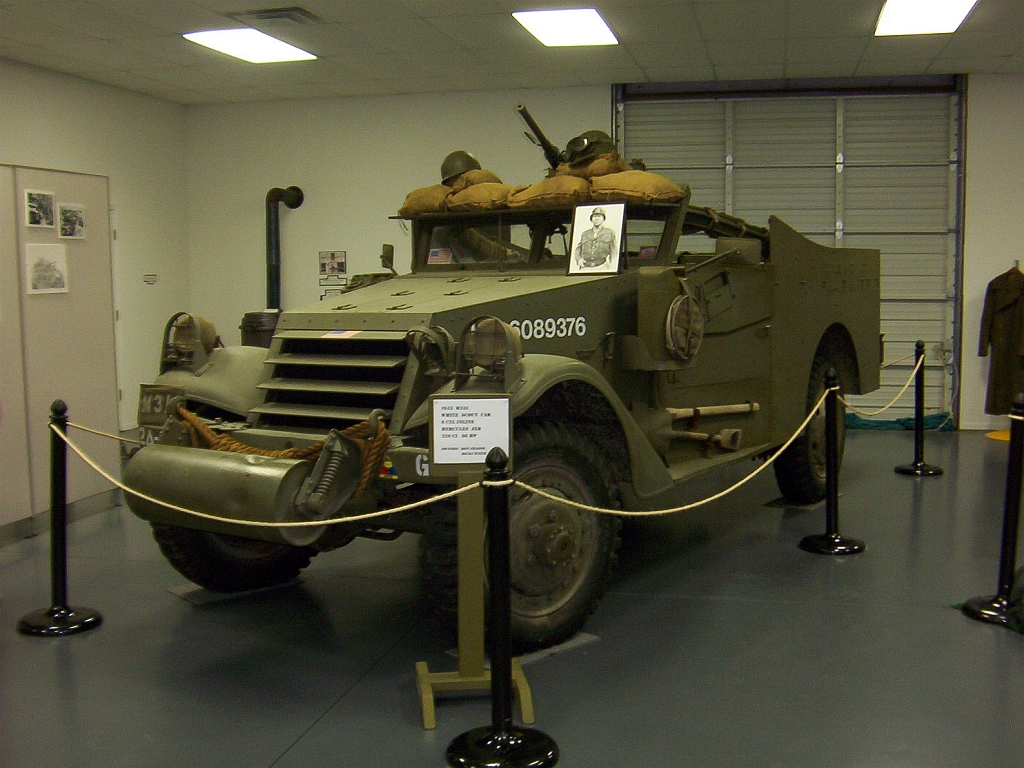
Armored vehicle exhibit

=== Foundation and purpose ===
The Veterans' Museum, located on the site of the former air base, was built in 1997. It is owned and operated by the Dyersburg Army Air Base Memorial Association, a non-profit organization.

The purpose of the museum is the preservation and documentation of materials related to military activities from World War I to the Iraq War, as well as documenting the history of the air base itself.

RV parking is available at no charge, and admittance to the museum is free. Electrical hookup is $10 per day.

=== Exhibits ===
==== Museum ====
The exhibits of the Veterans' Museum stem from donations by organizations and individuals.

The 8,900 ft^{2} (827 m^{2}) indoor exhibition displays items ranging from military vehicle displays and uniforms to photographs, personal and official letters, diaries, technical publications, divisional histories, videos and other military memorabilia.

Murals painted by Ernie Berke and photographs of 72 crews are also displayed.

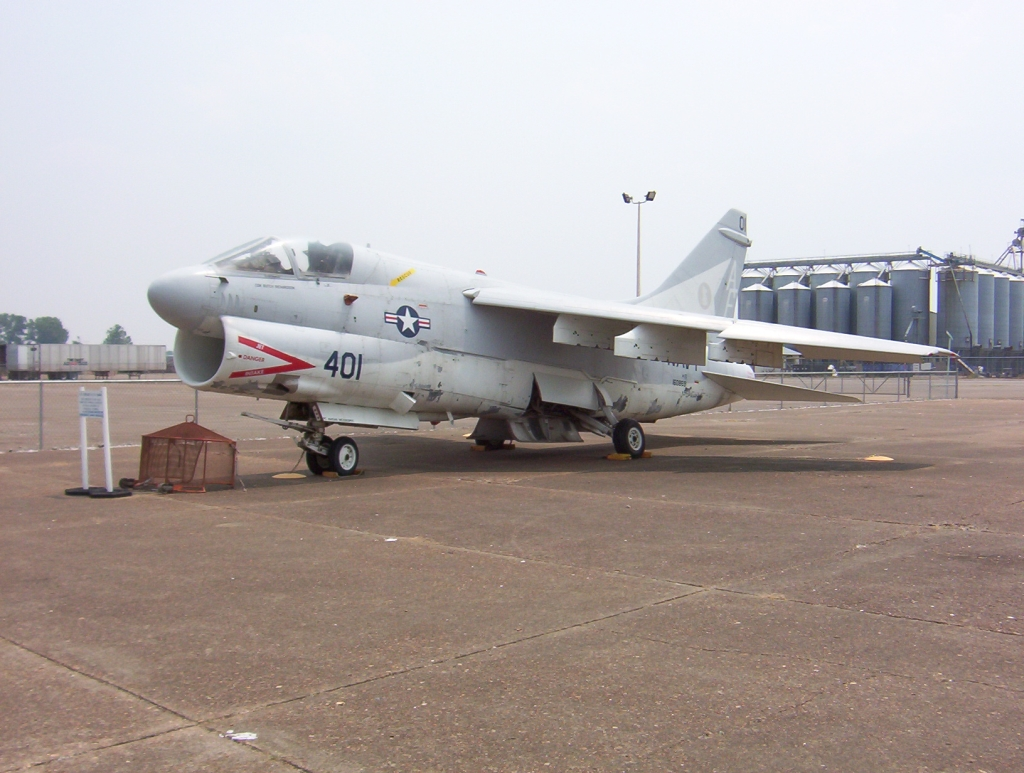
A-7 Corsair II in front of the Veterans' Museum

==== Outside exhibits ====
- Ling-Temco-Vought A-7E Corsair II (Serial number 160869): constructed for US Navy in 1981 and was previously used as a ground trainer at Naval Air Station Memphis
- Boeing Vertol CH-46E Sea Knight (Serial number 156427): Originally used by the US Marine Corp, The museum received this aircraft on loan from the USAF Museum in 2011. FedEx assisted with moving it from Arizona.
- Other military vehicles

Special exhibits:

- World War I – A complete uniform and field gear of local resident C.C Sumrow is from the collection of Tommy Simmons.
- Memphis Belle Exhibit – The exhibit tells the story of the Memphis Belle, its crew, postwar history of the Belle, and a look at the Altus Crew who flew it to Memphis, Tennessee in 1946.
- Home Front Exhibit – Pictures and uniforms of area veterans who served are on display. Also included in this exhibit are pictures of weddings where local ladies married soldiers in training at the Base.
- At Home Exhibit – A living room looking like "at home" during the 1940s is shown. From the radio and the coal stove, to the buffet and other items, it provides a real look at rural homes.

=== Air shows ===
At irregular intervals, the museum organizes and houses air shows on Arnold Field.

=== Other facilities ===
The museum houses conference facilities for up to 50 people and the Sammie Arnold Lending Library, with books covering the topics documented in the museum.

== See also ==
- List of airports in Tennessee
