= Jackson County Airport (Tennessee) =

- IATA: none; ICAO: none; FAA LID: 1A7

Summary
- Airport type: Public
- Owner: Jackson County
- Serves: Gainesboro, Tennessee
- Elevation AMSL: 515 ft (157 m)
- Coordinates: 36°23′50″N 085°38′30″W

Map
- Location of airport in Tennessee 1A7 (the United States)

Runways
Direction	Length		Surface
Direction	ft	m	Surface
18/36	3,500	1,067	Asphalt

Statistics (2009)
- Aircraft operations: 2,437
- Based aircraft: 6
- Source: Federal Aviation Administration

Jackson County Airport (FAA LID: 1A7) is a county-owned, public-use airport located 3 nautical miles (6 km) northeast of the central business district of Gainesboro, in Jackson County, Tennessee, United States.

== Facilities and aircraft ==
Jackson County Airport covers an area of 65 acres (26 ha) at an elevation of 515 feet (157 m) above mean sea level. It has one runway designated 18/36 with an asphalt surface measuring 3,500 by 75 feet (1,067 x 23 m).

For the 12-month period ending March 19, 2009, the airport had 2,437 aircraft operations, an average of 203 per month: 94% general aviation and 6% military. At that time there were six aircraft based at this airport: 66.7% single-engine, 16.7% helicopter and 16.7% ultralight.

== See also ==
- List of airports in Tennessee
