= Lebanon Municipal Airport (Tennessee) =

Airport in Tennessee, United States

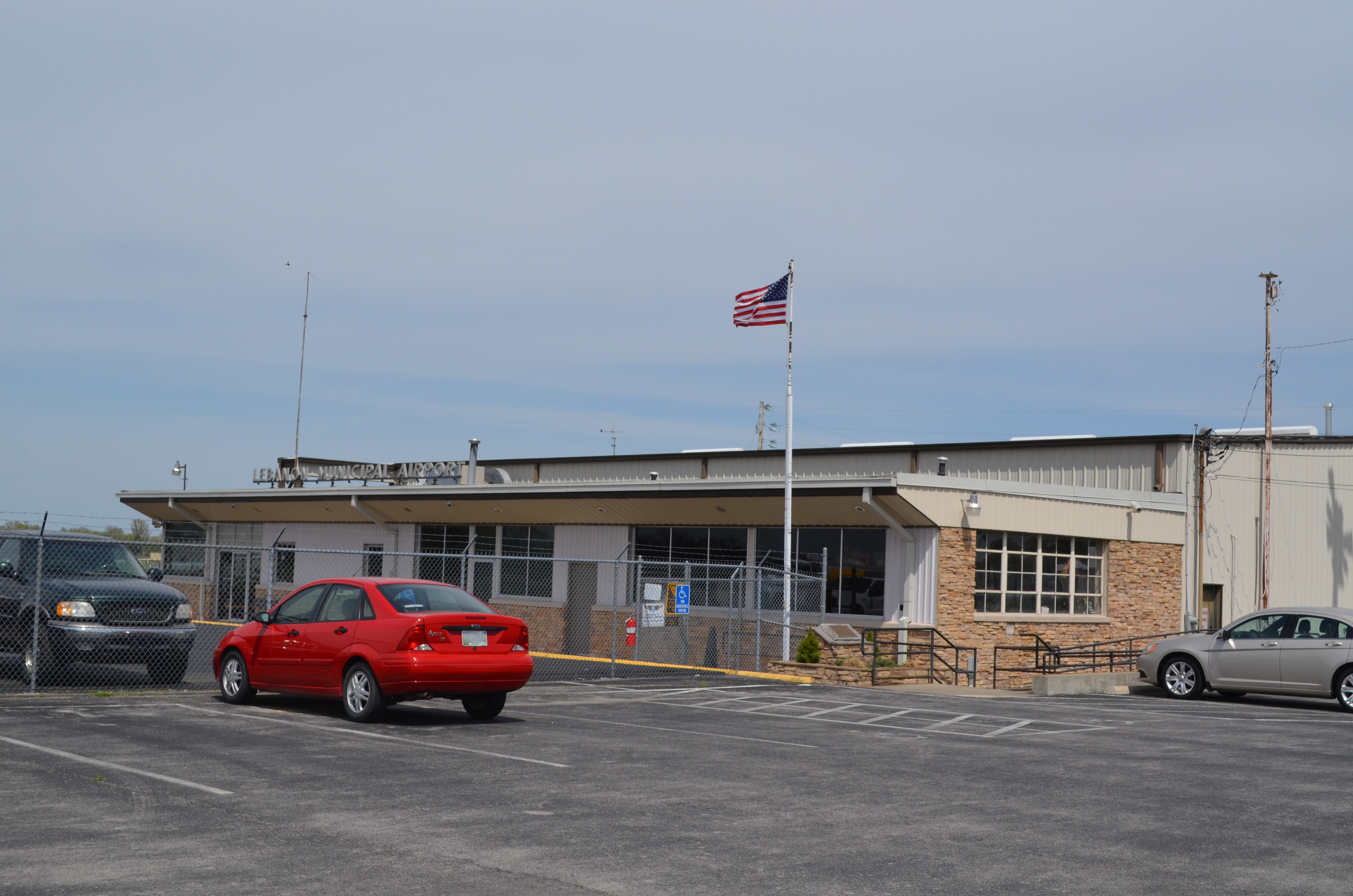
- IATA: none; ICAO: none; FAA LID: M54

Summary
- Airport type: Public
- Owner: City of Lebanon
- Serves: Lebanon, Tennessee
- Elevation AMSL: 588 ft / 179 m
- Coordinates: 36°11′25″N 086°18′56″W

Map
- Location of airport in Tennessee M54 (the United States)

Runways
Direction	Length		Surface
Direction	ft	m	Surface
1/19	5,000	1,524	Asphalt
4/22	1,801	549	Turf

Statistics (2021)
- Aircraft operations: 58,000
- Based aircraft: 188
- Source: Federal Aviation Administration

Lebanon Municipal Airport (FAA LID: M54) is a city-owned public-use airport located two nautical miles (4 km) southwest of the central business district of Lebanon, a city in Wilson County, Tennessee, United States. This airport is included in the National Plan of Integrated Airport Systems for 2011–2015, which categorized it as a general aviation airport.

== Facilities and aircraft ==
Lebanon Municipal Airport covers an area of 256 acres (104 ha) at an elevation of 588 feet (179 m) above mean sea level. It has two runways: 1/19 is 5,000 by 100 feet (1,524 x 30 m) with an asphalt pavement and 4/22 is 1,801 by 150 feet (549 x 46 m) with a turf surface.

For the 12-month period ending April 12, 2010, the airport had 10,946 aircraft operations, an average of 29 per day: 93% general aviation, 6% air taxi, and 1% military. At that time there were 70 aircraft based at this airport: 81% single-engine, 6% multi-engine, 3% jet, 4% helicopter, and 6% ultralight.

Vanderbilt Lifeflight also bases a Pilatus PC-12 at Lebanon Municipal Airport.

Military Facilities

The Tennessee Air National Guard maintains an area at M54. H-60 Blackhawks have been reported to land and take off at M54.

Flight Training

Class Bravo Air holds flight training classes at this airport.

== See also ==
- List of airports in Tennessee
