= General DeWitt Spain Airport =

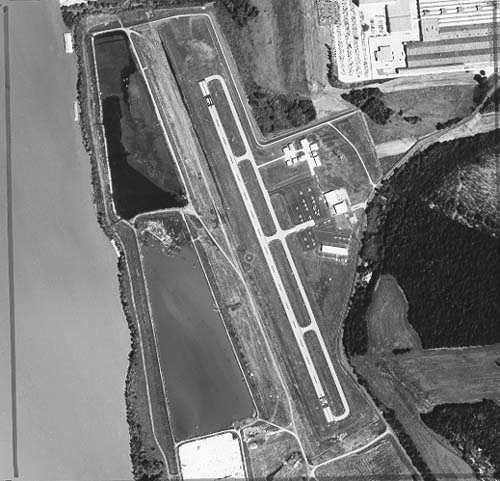
- Satellite photo of M01
- IATA: none; ICAO: none; FAA LID: M01

Summary
- Airport type: Public
- Owner/Operator: Memphis - Shelby County Airport Authority
- Serves: Memphis metropolitan area
- Location: Memphis, Tennessee
- Elevation AMSL: 224 ft / 68.3 m
- Coordinates: 35°12′02″N 090°03′14″W

Map
- Location of airport in Tennessee MO1 (the United States)

Runways
Direction	Length		Surface
Direction	ft	m	Surface
17/35	3,800	1,158	Asphalt

Statistics (2009)
- Aircraft operations: 82,456
- Based aircraft: 102
- Sources: Tennessee Department of Transportation, airport website, & AirNav FAA

General DeWitt Spain Airport (FAA LID: M01) is a civil, public airport located five miles (8 km) northwest of the central business district of Memphis, a city in Shelby County, Tennessee, United States. It is owned and operated by the Memphis - Shelby County Airport Authority.

== History ==
General DeWitt Spain Airport began as an idea in 1928 when the Memphis Chamber of Commerce Engineering Committee suggested turning Mud Island into Memphis' Airport. They decided against that location for a main airport and moved Memphis International Airport to its current location in South Memphis. However, the idea apparently did not fade.

In 1959, Memphis Downtown Airport was put into service about where Mud Island Park is today to service the general aviation community. It had the slogan: "You're strictly uptown when you land downtown." A ferry boat took travelers from the Island to the cobblestones, and then it was just a short walk to the offices of Memphis' city center. Private pilots who worked downtown and business travelers had the perfect arrangement. By 1961, 30 planes were landing per day, according to newspaper reports.

By the mid-1960s, Interstate 40 was scheduled to cross the Island. Airport owners fought the I-40 Bridge, but in August, 1970, the last plane departed the island airport. Quickly the airport authority purchased available land just to the north of the island so downtown commuters could once again have their landing strip back. The following May, Memphis Downtown Airport was replaced by General DeWitt Spain Airport, honoring local war hero General DeWitt Spain who died in 1969. It has been and still is an active general aviation airport.

On April 11, 2016, General Dewitt Spain Airport suffered its first accident of an Unmanned Aerial Vehicle after a Phantom Quadcopter impacted the side of a hangar. No fatalities were reported. The Quadcopter was unregistered and unable to be traced to the operator.

== Facilities and aircraft ==
Runway 17/35 is a 3,800 × 75 ft (1,158 × 23 m) asphalt runway. Its weight limitation for a single wheel is 25,000 lbs. The pattern for runway 17 is a right-hand pattern due to some 649-foot (AMSL) towers to the northeast of the field.

The Memphis-Shelby County Airport Authority operates the FBO and it is run by Airport Manager Jason McBride.

General DeWitt Spain Airport is home to Helicopters Inc, a Part 91 helicopter service. Helicopters Inc does aerial imaging, tours, pipeline and power line inspections, and video around the Mid-South. They operate one Enstrom F28A helicopter.

General DeWitt Spain Airport does not have a control tower, but pilots operating out of the airport can receive radar service from Memphis International Airport.

== See also ==
- List of airports in Tennessee
