= Charles W. Baker Airport =

Airport in Shelby County, Tennessee, US

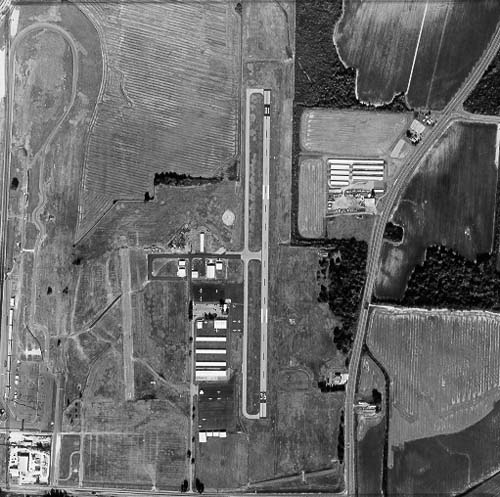
- Charles W. Baker from above
- IATA: none; ICAO: none; FAA LID: 2M8

Summary
- Airport type: Public
- Owner: Memphis - Shelby County Airport Authority
- Serves: Millington, TN
- Location: Shelby County, TN
- Elevation AMSL: 247 ft / 75.3 m
- Coordinates: 35°16′44.31″N 89°55′53.31″W
- Website: charleswbakerairport.com

Map
- Location of airport in Tennessee 2M8 (the United States)

Runways
Direction	Length		Surface
Direction	ft	m	Surface
18/36	3,500	1,066.8	Asphalt

Statistics (2023)
- Operations: 28,000
- Based Aircraft: 110
- Source: FAA

Charles W. Baker Airport (FAA LID: 2M8) is a civil, publicly owned airport. It is located four miles (6 km) southwest of the central business district of Millington, a city in Shelby County, Tennessee, United States. It is 10 miles (16 km) from downtown Memphis. It is owned and operated by Memphis - Shelby County Airport Authority. It also immediately adjacent to Memphis International Raceway.

== History ==
The airfield was originally built during World War II as an outlying landing field (OLF) to Naval Air Station Memphis and consisted of eight 1600-foot (488 meters) paved runways arranged in a Star of David pattern. Considered surplus at the war's end, the OLF was released to civilian control in 1946. Charles W. Baker Airport opened in 1959 and has also been known as "Shelby County Airport."

== Facilities and aircraft ==
Charles W. Baker Airport is on a 259-acre (1.05 km^{2}) plot of land. It has an asphalt runway 18/36 that is 3,500 x 75 feet (1,066.8 x 28.7 meters) and handles up to 25,000 lb (11,000 kg). Runway 18U/36U, which used to be designed solely for ultra-light aircraft, was 1,600 x 75 feet (487.7 x 28.7 m) but is now closed.

Charles W. Baker Airport offers 100LL and Jet-A fuels from its self-serve fuel station, which is accessible 24/7/365. Charles W. Baker has a terminal with a pilot's lounge and a meeting room.

== Airlines and destinations ==
No regular service operates to or from Charles W. Baker Airport.

== See also ==
- List of airports in Tennessee
