= Gatlinburg–Pigeon Forge Airport =

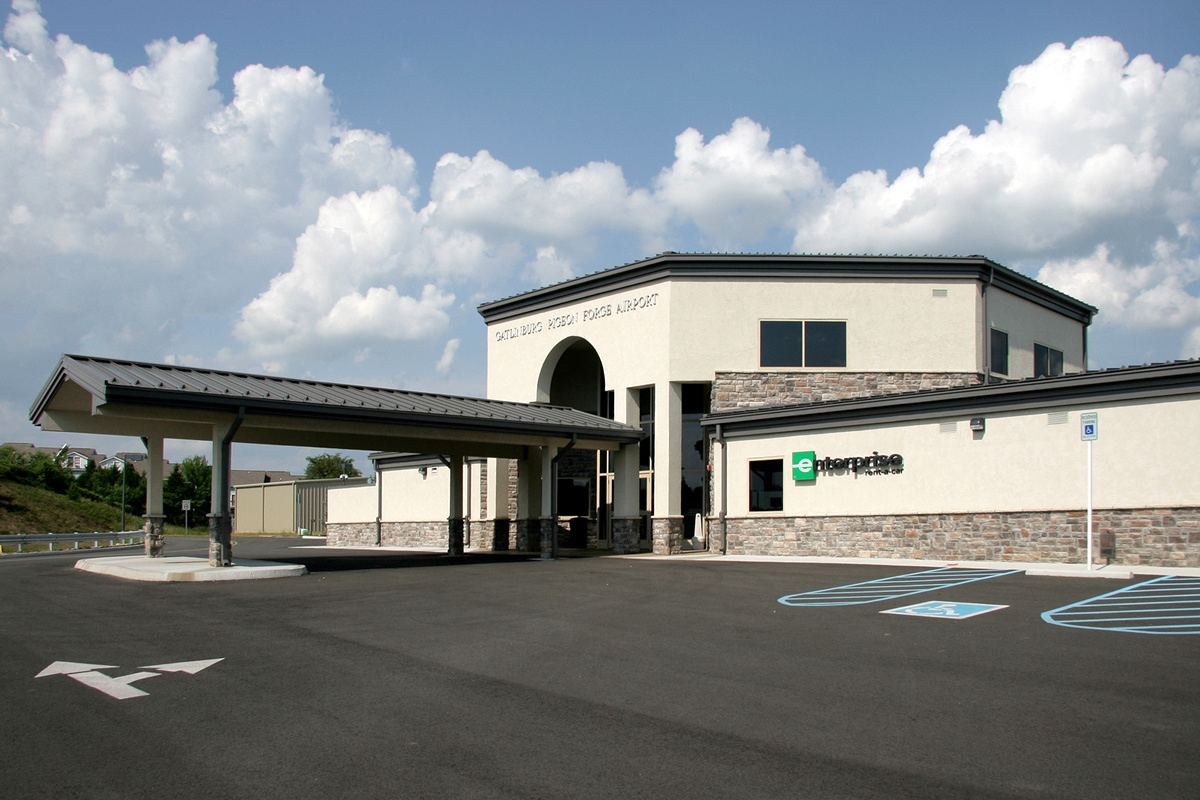
- IATA: GKT; ICAO: KGKT; FAA LID: GKT

Summary
- Airport type: Public
- Owner: Sevier County
- Serves: Gatlinburg / Pigeon Forge
- Location: Sevierville, Tennessee
- Elevation AMSL: 1,014 ft (309 m)
- Coordinates: 35°51′28″N 083°31′43″W

Map
- Location of airport in Tennessee GKT (the United States)

Runways
Direction	Length		Surface
Direction	ft	m	Surface
10/28	5,506	1,678	Asphalt

Statistics (2022)
- Aircraft operations (year ending 8/2/2022): 115,178
- Based aircraft: 77
- Sources: Tennessee DOT, FAA

Gatlinburg–Pigeon Forge Airport (IATA: GKT, ICAO: KGKT, FAA LID: GKT) is a county-owned public-use municipal airport in Sevier County, Tennessee, United States. The airport is well north of the cities of Gatlinburg and Pigeon Forge, but only two nautical miles (3.7 km) southeast of the central business district of Sevierville, and within its city limits.

== Facilities and aircraft ==
Gatlinburg–Pigeon Forge Airport covers an area of 210 acres (85 ha) at an elevation of 1,014 feet (309 m) above mean sea level. It has one runway designated 10/28 with an asphalt surface measuring 5,506 by 75 feet (1,678 x 23 m).

For the 12-month period ending August 2, 2022, the airport had 115,178 aircraft operations, an average of 315 per day: 96% general aviation, 5% air taxi and <1% military. At that time there were 77 aircraft based at this airport: 56 single-engine, 8 multi-engine, 6 jet and 7 helicopter.

The Tennessee Museum of Aviation is located at the airport.

== See also ==
- List of airports in Tennessee
