= Carroll County Airport (Tennessee) =

Airport in Tennessee, United States

- IATA: none; ICAO: KHZD; FAA LID: HZD

Summary
- Airport type: Public
- Owner: Carroll County, Tennessee
- Serves: Huntingdon, Tennessee
- Elevation AMSL: 497 ft (151 m)
- Coordinates: 36°05′21″N 088°27′48″W
- Interactive map of Carroll County Airport

Runways
Direction	Length		Surface
Direction	ft	m	Surface
1/19	5,507	1,679	Asphalt

Statistics
- Aircraft operations (2009): 12,290
- Based aircraft: 21
- Source: Federal Aviation Administration

Carroll County Airport (ICAO: KHZD, FAA LID: HZD) is a county-owned public-use airport in Carroll County, Tennessee, United States. It is located four nautical miles (4.6 mi; 7.4 km) northwest of the central business district of Huntingdon, Tennessee. The airport is included in the FAA's National Plan of Integrated Airport Systems for 2011–2015, which categorized it as a general aviation facility.

Although many U.S. airports use the same three-letter location identifier for the FAA and IATA, this facility is assigned HZD by the FAA but has no designation from the IATA.

== Facilities and aircraft ==
Carroll County Airport covers an area of 196 acres (79 ha) at an elevation of 497 feet (151 m) above mean sea level. It has one runway designated 1/19 with an asphalt surface measuring 5,507 by 100 feet (1,679 by 30 m).

For the 12-month period ending June 18, 2009, the airport had 12,290 aircraft operations, an average of 33 per day: 99.6% general aviation and 0.4% air taxi. At that time there were 21 single-engine aircraft based at this airport.

== See also ==
- List of airports in Tennessee
