= Mark Anton Airport =

- IATA: none; ICAO: none; FAA LID: 2A0

Summary
- Airport type: Public
- Owner: City of Dayton
- Serves: Dayton, Tennessee
- Elevation AMSL: 718 ft / 219 m
- Coordinates: 35°29′10″N 084°55′52″W
- Website: https://www.daytontn.net/government/airport_committee.php

Map
- Location of airport in Tennessee 2A0 (the United States)

Runways
Direction	Length		Surface
Direction	ft	m	Surface
3/21	5,001	1,524	Asphalt

Statistics
- Aircraft operations (2017): 8,100
- Source: Federal Aviation Administration

Mark Anton Airport (FAA LID: 2A0), also known as Mark Anton Municipal Airport, is a public airport located four miles (6 km) east of the central business district of Dayton, a city in Rhea County, Tennessee, United States. It is owned by the City of Dayton.

== Facilities and aircraft ==
Mark Anton Airport covers an area of 258 acres (104 ha) which contains one asphalt paved runway (3/21) measuring 5,001 x 75 ft (1,524 x 23 m). For the 12-month period ending December 1, 2017, the airport had 8,100 aircraft operations, an average of 22 per day: 98% general aviation and 1% military.

== See also ==
- List of airports in Tennessee
