= Beech River Regional Airport =

- IATA: none; ICAO: KPVE; FAA LID: PVE

Summary
- Airport type: Public
- Owner: Beech River Regional Airport Authority
- Serves: Lexington / Parsons
- Location: Darden, Tennessee
- Elevation AMSL: 488 ft (149 m)
- Coordinates: 35°39′23″N 088°11′43″W
- Website: BeechRiverRegionalAirport.com
- Interactive map of Beech River Regional Airport

Runways
Direction	Length		Surface
Direction	ft	m	Surface
1/19	6,000	1,829	Concrete

Statistics (2010)
- Aircraft operations: 3,440
- Based aircraft: 26
- Source: Federal Aviation Administration

Beech River Regional Airport (ICAO: KPVE, FAA LID: PVE) is a public-use airport in Henderson County, Tennessee, United States. It is located five nautical miles (5.8 mi; 9.3 km) northwest of the central business district of Parsons, a city in Decatur County.

The airport opened in 2006 and is owned by Beech River Regional Airport Authority, representing the cities of Lexington and Parsons, the counties of Henderson and Decatur, and the state of Tennessee. It is included in the FAA's National Plan of Integrated Airport Systems for 2011–2015, which categorized it as a general aviation facility.

Although many U.S. airports use the same three-letter location identifier for the FAA and IATA, this facility is assigned PVE by the FAA but has no designation from the IATA, which assigned PVE to El Porvenir, Panama.

== Facilities and aircraft ==
Beech River Regional Airport covers an area of 467 acres (189 ha) at an elevation of 488 feet (149 m) above mean sea level. It has one runway designated 1/19 with a concrete surface measuring 6,000 by 100 feet (1,829 by 30 m).

For the 12-month period ending August 31, 2010, the airport had 3,440 aircraft operations, an average of 286 per month; 93% were general aviation, 6% were air taxi, and 1% were military. At that time, 26 aircraft were based at this airport, 73% single-engined, 15% multiengined, and 13% jet.

The airport is attended during regular business hours and has 100LL avgas and Jet A fuel services. It is included under the Jackson FSS. It has runway lighting and PAPI on both runways, and is lighted sunset to sunrise. NOTAMs are filed with McKellar-Sipes Regional Airport. PVE is located on the Memphis sectional chart.

== See also ==
- List of airports in Tennessee
