= Halls, Tennessee =

- Town
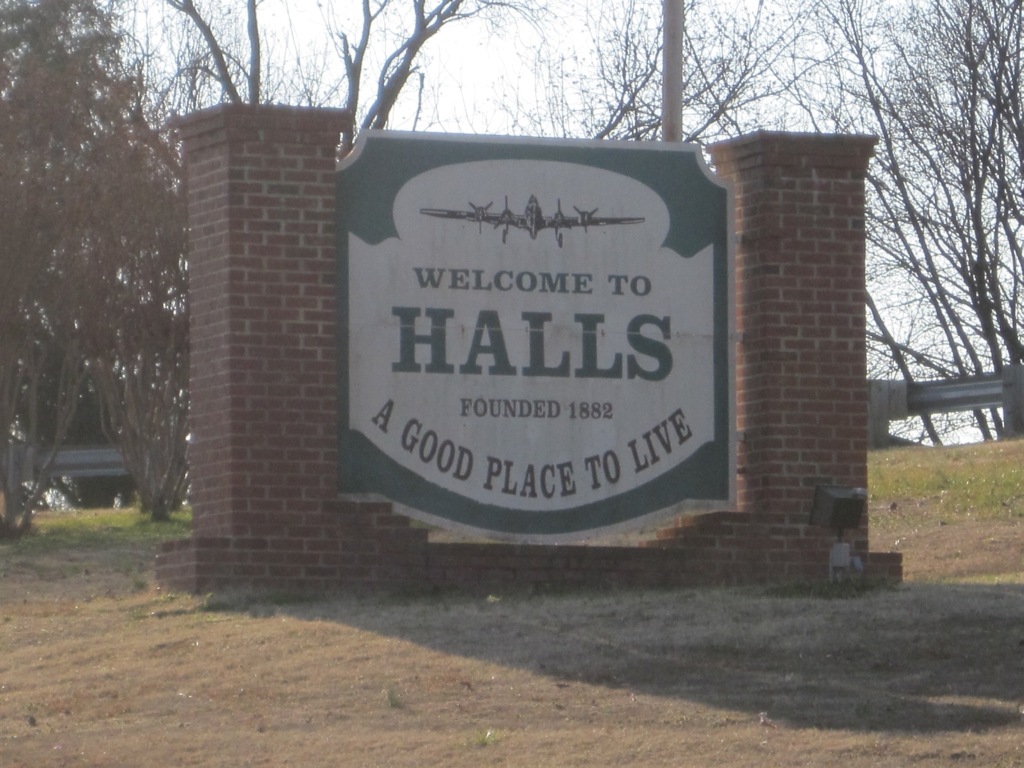

- Location of Halls in Lauderdale County, Tennessee.
- Coordinates: 35°52′32″N 89°23′46″W
- Country: United States
- State: Tennessee
- County: Lauderdale

Area
  - Total: 3.69 sq mi (9.56 km^{2})
  - Land: 3.68 sq mi (9.54 km^{2})
  - Water: 0.0077 sq mi (0.02 km^{2})
- Elevation: 318 ft (97 m)

Population (2020)
  - Total: 2,091
  - Density: 567.9/sq mi (219.25/km^{2})
- Time zone: UTC-6 (Central (CST))
  - Summer (DST): UTC-5 (CDT)
- ZIP code: 38040
- Area code: 731
- FIPS code: 47-31820
- GNIS feature ID: 1286606
- Website: townofhallstn.us

Halls is a town in Lauderdale County, Tennessee, United States. As of the 2020 census, Halls had a population of 2,091.

The town was founded in 1882 as a railroad station stop. It is named after Hansford R. Hall, one of the founders. Among the early business ventures were sawmills and cotton gins, founded in the 1880s to process local lumber and cotton.

== History ==
The town was not established until 1882, when the Newport News & Mississippi Valley Railroad (later the Illinois Central Railroad) set up a railroad stop on land in northern Lauderdale County. By 1899, the town had its own bank, and the following year the Cumberland Telephone and Telegraph Company had set up a line connecting it to the county seat, Ripley.

The village was originally named Hall's Station in honor of Hansford R. Hall, one of the founders. Other founders were J. S. Stephens and S. A. Jordan, early businessmen of Lauderdale County.

E. Stanfield, general merchant, was first to set up a business at Hall's Station in 1882. Other early businesses included Young & Sawyer, a steam-powered cotton gin; D. P. Shoffner, steam sawmill and wagon material; J. H. Farmer, saw-, grist- and planing-mill and cotton gin. As of 1887, there were about 400 people in the community.

In August 1942, the U.S. Army Air Forces constructed Dyersburg Army Air Field on the north side of town. This was a major B-17 and B-24 base during World War 2. It closed in 1946 and was eventually converted to a municipal airport.

On January 17, 1999, a tornado struck Halls damaging a restaurant and The Halls First United Methodist Church. The church has since been rebuilt in another location.

== Geography ==
Halls is located at 35°52′32″N 89°23′46″W.

According to the United States Census Bureau, the town has a total area of 3.7 square miles (9.6 km^{2}), of which 3.7 square miles (9.6 km^{2}) is land and 0.27% is water.

Halls is situated on the southeastern edge of the New Madrid Seismic Zone, an area with a high earthquake risk.

== Demographics ==
Historical population
Census	Pop.	Note	%±
1890	441		—
1900	395		−10.4%
1910	882		123.3%
1920	1,400		58.7%
1930	1,474		5.3%
1940	1,511		2.5%
1950	1,808		19.7%
1960	1,890		4.5%
1970	2,323		22.9%
1980	2,444		5.2%
1990	2,431		−0.5%
2000	2,311		−4.9%
2010	2,255		−2.4%
2020	2,091		−7.3%

=== 2020 census ===
Halls racial composition
Race	Num.	Perc.
White (non-Hispanic)	1,319	63.08%
Black or African American (non-Hispanic)	557	26.64%
Native American	10	0.48%
Asian	3	0.14%
Other/Mixed	136	6.5%
Hispanic or Latino	66	3.16%

As of the 2020 United States census, there were 2,091 people, 887 households, and 557 families residing in the town.

=== 2000 census ===
As of the census of 2000, there were 2,311 people, 946 households, and 642 families residing in the town. The population density was 630.8 inhabitants per square mile (243.6/km^{2}). There were 1,051 housing units at an average density of 286.9 per square mile (110.8/km^{2}). The racial makeup of the town was 70.45% White, 28.13% African American, 0.48% Native American, 0.09% Asian, 0.04% Pacific Islander, 0.17% from other races, and 0.65% from two or more races. Hispanic or Latino of any race were 0.65% of the population.

There were 946 households, out of which 29.7% had children under the age of 18 living with them, 45.3% were married couples living together, 17.7% had a female householder with no husband present, and 32.1% were non-families. 30.0% of all households were made up of individuals, and 15.9% had someone living alone who was 65 years of age or older. The average household size was 2.44 and the average family size was 3.03.

In the town, the population was spread out, with 26.7% under the age of 18, 7.7% from 18 to 24, 26.8% from 25 to 44, 22.3% from 45 to 64, and 16.4% who were 65 years of age or older. The median age was 37 years. For every 100 females, there were 87.1 males. For every 100 females age 18 and over, there were 81.8 males.

The median income for a household in the town was $24,142, and the median income for a family was $29,063. Males had a median income of $26,528 versus $19,300 for females. The per capita income for the town was $15,011. About 21.8% of families and 23.3% of the population were below the poverty line, including 29.2% of those under age 18 and 29.0% of those age 65 or over.

== Transportation ==
Arnold Field, a former WW2 B-17 base, is the city's airport. It contains a single 4,700 foot concrete runway.

The town of Halls is served by the Fulton Division of the Canadian National Railroad.

== Veterans' Museum ==
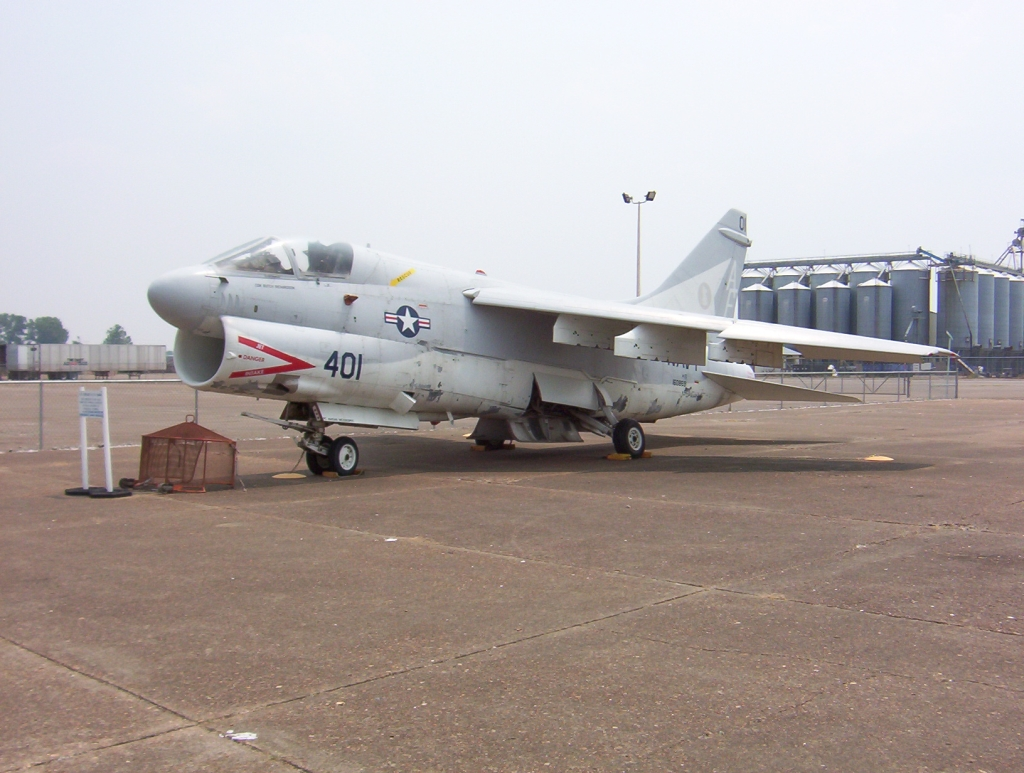
A-7 Corsair II in front of the Veterans' Museum in Halls

The Veterans' Museum, on the grounds of the former Dyersburg Army Air Base (Arnold Field), is dedicated to the preservation and documentation of materials related to military activities from World War I to the Iraq War, as well as documenting the history of the air base itself.

== Notable person ==
- Ronnie Glynn, member of the Tennessee House of Representatives (2023–present)
