= List of municipalities in Tennessee =

Map of the United States with Tennessee highlighted

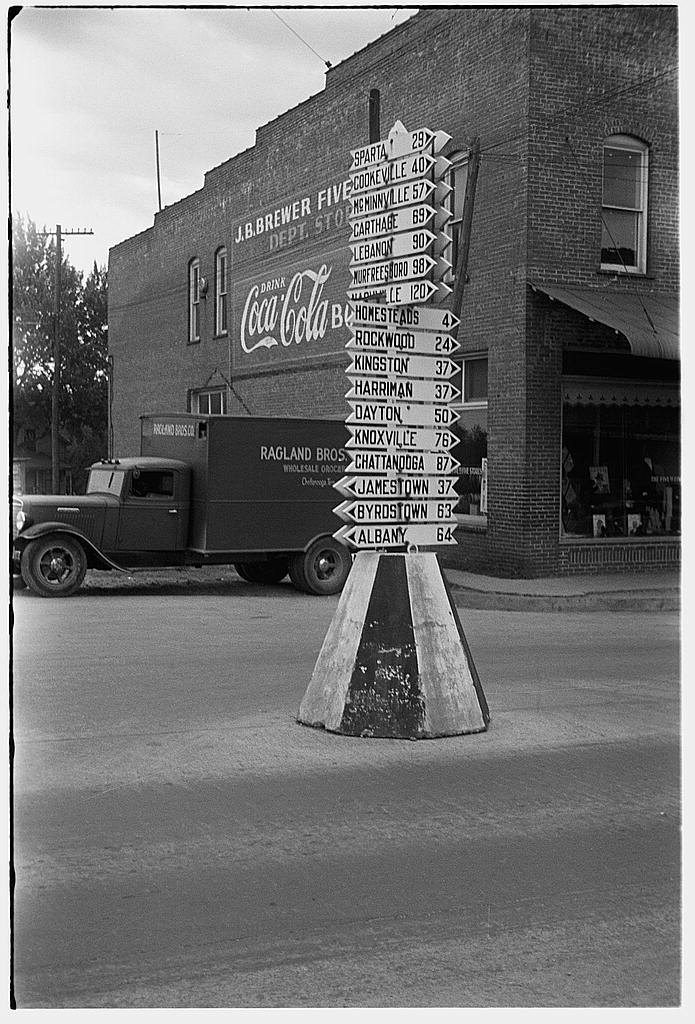
These directional signs in Crossville, photographed in 1937 by Ben Shahn as part of a New Deal program, helped travelers find their way to other Tennessee cities and towns.

Tennessee is a state located in the Southern United States. There are 346 municipalities in the state of Tennessee. Municipalities in the state are designated as "cities" or "towns". As of the 2010 U.S. census, 3,564,494 Tennesseans, or just over 56% of the state's total population of 6,346,105, lived in these 346 municipalities. The remainder lived in unincorporated areas.

== Municipal charters ==
Before 1954, all Tennessee municipalities were established by private act of the state legislature and operated under charters. As of 2007, 212 of the state's municipalities were operating under charters established by private act of the legislature. In 1953, amendments to the Tennessee Constitution prohibited subsequent incorporations by private act and provided for several new forms of municipal charter. Fourteen cities, including Memphis, Knoxville, and Chattanooga, three of the state's four largest cities, are "home rule cities" organized under charters approved by referendum of the citizens. Home rule charters are authorized by Article XI, Section 9, of the Tennessee State Constitution, as amended in 1953. Other municipalities are incorporated under one of several standardized types of charter authorized by state statute:

- 67 cities use a mayor-aldermanic charter under Tennessee Code Annotated (TCA) §6-1-101 et seq. Hendersonville is the largest city using this type of charter.
- 49 cities use a uniform city manager-commission charter under TCA §6-18-101 et seq. Brentwood is the largest city operating with a uniform manager-commission charter.
- Two cities (Elizabethton and Union City) are incorporated under a modified city manager-council charter under TCA §6-30-101 et seq.
- Consolidated city-county governments exist in three places: Nashville and Davidson County, Lynchburg and Moore County, and Hartsville and Trousdale County. City-county government consolidation is authorized by the Tennessee Constitution as amended in 1953 and TCA Title 7.

Some Tennessee municipalities are called "cities" and others are called "towns." These terms do not have legal significance in Tennessee and are not related to population, date of establishment, or type of municipal charter.

Under current state law (TCA Title 6), a minimum of 1,500 residents are required to incorporate as a new municipality under the mayor-alderman or city manager-commission charter, and a minimum of 5,000 residents are required to incorporate under a modified city manager-council charter. In general, unincorporated areas within three miles of an existing municipality (within five miles if the municipality has a population of 100,000 or more) are not permitted to incorporate as new municipalities. Provisions for incorporation were less restrictive in the past. The capital of Tennessee is Nashville.

County seat^{[A]}

Incorporated cities and towns
Place Name	County(ies)^{[B]}	Population (2020 Census)	Area (as of 2010)	Form of municipal charter	Incorporation date	Region
Adams	Robertson County	633	2.68 sq mi (6.9 km^{2})	Uniform manager-commission	1963	Middle
Adamsville	McNairy County; Hardin County	2,207	6.91 sq mi (17.9 km^{2})	Private act	1869	West
Alamo	Crockett County	2,461	2.2 sq mi (5.7 km^{2})	Private act	1911	West
Alcoa	Blount County	10,978	15.66 sq mi (40.6 km^{2})	Private act	1919	East
Alexandria	DeKalb County	966	2.02 sq mi (5.2 km^{2})	Private act	1848	Middle
Algood	Putnam County	3,495	4.03 sq mi (10.4 km^{2})	Private act	1901	Middle
Allardt	Fentress County	634	3.9 sq mi (10 km^{2})	Mayor-alderman	1964	Middle
Altamont	Grundy County	1,045	20.16 sq mi (52.2 km^{2})	Private act	1854	Middle
Ardmore	Giles County	1,213	4.59 sq mi (11.9 km^{2})	Private act	1949	Middle
Arlington	Shelby County	14,549	23.07 sq mi (59.8 km^{2})	Mayor-alderman	1900	West
Ashland City	Cheatham County	5,193	10.85 sq mi (28.1 km^{2})	Private act	1859	Middle
Athens	McMinn County	14,084	13.98 sq mi (36.2 km^{2})	Private act	1870	East
Atoka	Tipton County	10,008	12.36 sq mi (32.0 km^{2})	Private act	1838	West
Atwood	Carroll County	938	1.85 sq mi (4.8 km^{2})	Mayor-alderman	1941	West
Auburntown	Cannon County	269	0.57 sq mi (1.5 km^{2})	Private act	1949	Middle
Baileyton	Greene County	431	1.68 sq mi (4.4 km^{2})	Private act	1915	East
Baneberry	Jefferson County	482	1.82 sq mi (4.7 km^{2})	Uniform manager-commission	1986	East
Bartlett	Shelby County	57,786	26.67 sq mi (69.1 km^{2})	Private act	1866	West
Baxter	Putnam County	1,365	3.03 sq mi (7.8 km^{2})	Private act	1915	Middle
Bean Station	Grainger County	2,826	5.39 sq mi (14.0 km^{2})	Mayor-alderman	1996	East
Beersheba Springs	Grundy County	477	4.91 sq mi (12.7 km^{2})	Uniform manager-commission	1955	Middle
Bell Buckle	Bedford County	500	0.6 sq mi (1.6 km^{2})	Mayor-alderman	1877	Middle
Belle Meade	Davidson County	2,912	3.08 sq mi (8.0 km^{2})	Uniform manager-commission	1938	Middle
Bells	Crockett County	2,437	2.33 sq mi (6.0 km^{2})	Private act	1889	West
Benton	Polk County	1,385	3.21 sq mi (8.3 km^{2})	Private act	1915	East
Berry Hill	Davidson County	2,112	0.91 sq mi (2.4 km^{2})	Uniform manager-commission	1950	Middle
Bethel Springs	McNairy County	718	2.16 sq mi (5.6 km^{2})	Private act	1870	West
Big Sandy	Benton County	557	0.71 sq mi (1.8 km^{2})	Private act	1903	West
Blaine	Grainger County	1,856	9.39 sq mi (24.3 km^{2})	Mayor-alderman	1978	East
Bluff City	Sullivan County	1,733	1.6 sq mi (4.1 km^{2})	Private act	1870	East
Bolivar	Hardeman County	5,205	8.42 sq mi (21.8 km^{2})	Private act	1827	West
Braden	Fayette County	282	3.83 sq mi (9.9 km^{2})	Uniform manager-commission	1969	West
Bradford	Gibson County	1,048	1.73 sq mi (4.5 km^{2})	Private act	1913	West
Brentwood	Williamson County	45,373	41.23 sq mi (106.8 km^{2})	Uniform manager-commission	1969	Middle
Brighton	Tipton County	2,735	2.79 sq mi (7.2 km^{2})	Private act	1913	West
Bristol	Sullivan County	27,147	32.44 sq mi (84.0 km^{2})	Private act	1856	East
Brownsville	Haywood County	9,788	10.2 sq mi (26 km^{2})	Private act	1870	West
Bruceton	Carroll County	1,478	1.89 sq mi (4.9 km^{2})	Private act	1925	West
Bulls Gap	Hawkins County	738	1.29 sq mi (3.3 km^{2})	Mayor-alderman	1955	East
Burlison	Tipton County	425	1.08 sq mi (2.8 km^{2})	Uniform manager-commission	1965	West
Burns	Dickson County	1,468	3.74 sq mi (9.7 km^{2})	Private act	1953	Middle
Byrdstown	Pickett County	803	1.53 sq mi (4.0 km^{2})	Private act	1917	Middle
Calhoun	McMinn County	490	1.15 sq mi (3.0 km^{2})	Uniform manager-commission	1961	East
Camden	Benton County	3,582	5.67 sq mi (14.7 km^{2})	Private act	1838	West
Carthage	Smith County	2,306	2.86 sq mi (7.4 km^{2})	Private act	1804	Middle
Caryville	Campbell County	2,297	5.4 sq mi (14 km^{2})	Mayor-alderman	1968	East
Cedar Hill	Robertson County	314	0.69 sq mi (1.8 km^{2})	Uniform manager-commission	1870	Middle
Celina	Clay County	1,495	1.7 sq mi (4.4 km^{2})	Private act	1846	Middle
Centertown	Warren County	243	0.94 sq mi (2.4 km^{2})	Private act	1951	Middle
Centerville	Hickman County	3,644	11.31 sq mi (29.3 km^{2})	Private act	1853	Middle
Chapel Hill	Marshall County	1,445	3.24 sq mi (8.4 km^{2})	Private act	1850	Middle
Charleston	Bradley County	651	1.06 sq mi (2.7 km^{2})	Uniform manager-commission	1956	East
Charlotte	Dickson County	1,235	1.74 sq mi (4.5 km^{2})	Private act	1804	Middle
Chattanooga	Hamilton County	181,099	144.55 sq mi (374.4 km^{2})	Home rule	1839	East
Church Hill	Hawkins County	6,998	9.81 sq mi (25.4 km^{2})	Mayor-alderman	1958	East
Clarksburg	Carroll County	393	2.02 sq mi (5.2 km^{2})	Mayor-alderman	1858	West
Clarksville	Montgomery County	166,722	98.28 sq mi (254.5 km^{2})	Private act	1807	Middle
Cleveland	Bradley County	47,356	26.9 sq mi (70 km^{2})	Private act	1842	East
Clifton	Wayne County	2,694	6.93 sq mi (17.9 km^{2})	Uniform manager-commission	1856	Middle
Clinton	Anderson County	10,056	12.02 sq mi (31.1 km^{2})	Home rule	1801	East
Coalmont	Grundy County	841	6.08 sq mi (15.7 km^{2})	Uniform manager-commission	1957	Middle
Collegedale	Hamilton County	11,109	9.9 sq mi (26 km^{2})	Uniform manager-commission	1968	East
Collierville	Shelby County	51,324	29.41 sq mi (76.2 km^{2})	Private act	1807	West
Collinwood	Wayne County	982	2.82 sq mi (7.3 km^{2})	Uniform manager-commission	1921	Middle
Columbia	Maury County	41,690	31.56 sq mi (81.7 km^{2})	Private act	1817	Middle
Cookeville	Putnam County	34,842	32.85 sq mi (85.1 km^{2})	Private act	1903	Middle
Coopertown	Robertson County	4,278	31.49 sq mi (81.6 km^{2})	Mayor-alderman	1996	Middle
Copperhill	Polk County	354	1.91 sq mi (4.9 km^{2})	Private act	1913	East
Cornersville	Marshall County	1,194	6.26 sq mi (16.2 km^{2})	Private act	1849	Middle
Cottage Grove	Henry County	88	0.19 sq mi (0.49 km^{2})	Private act	1856	West
Covington	Tipton County	8,663	11.44 sq mi (29.6 km^{2})	Private act	1826	West
Cowan	Franklin County	1,737	2.07 sq mi (5.4 km^{2})	Private act	1921	Middle
Crab Orchard	Cumberland County	996	11.11 sq mi (28.8 km^{2})	Mayor-alderman	1921	East
Cross Plains	Robertson County	1,714	8.49 sq mi (22.0 km^{2})	Uniform manager-commission	1973	Middle
Crossville	Cumberland County	12,071	20.36 sq mi (52.7 km^{2})	Private act	1901	East
Crump	Hardin County	1,428	13.36 sq mi (34.6 km^{2})	Mayor-alderman	1988	West
Cumberland City	Stewart County	311	5.31 sq mi (13.8 km^{2})	Mayor-alderman	1903	Middle
Cumberland Gap	Claiborne County	494	0.33 sq mi (0.85 km^{2})	Private act	1907	East
Dandridge	Jefferson County	2,812	6.42 sq mi (16.6 km^{2})	Private act	1799	East
Dayton	Rhea County	7,065	7.88 sq mi (20.4 km^{2})	Private act	1903	East
Decatur	Meigs County	1,598	3 sq mi (7.8 km^{2})	Private act	1838	East
Decaturville	Decatur County	867	1.66 sq mi (4.3 km^{2})	Private act	1850	West
Decherd	Franklin County	2,361	4.75 sq mi (12.3 km^{2})	Private act	1868	Middle
Dickson	Dickson County	16,058	20.03 sq mi (51.9 km^{2})	Private act	1873	Middle
Dover	Stewart County	1,417	3.88 sq mi (10.0 km^{2})	Mayor-alderman	1805	Middle
Dowelltown	DeKalb County	355	0.79 sq mi (2.0 km^{2})	Private act	1949	Middle
Doyle	White County	537	1.31 sq mi (3.4 km^{2})	Mayor-alderman	1905	Middle
Dresden	Weakley County	3,005	5.57 sq mi (14.4 km^{2})	Private act	1827	West
Ducktown	Polk County	475	2.63 sq mi (6.8 km^{2})	Uniform manager-commission	1951	East
Dunlap	Sequatchie County	5,357	10.74 sq mi (27.8 km^{2})	Private act	1901	Middle
Dyer	Gibson County	2,341	2.28 sq mi (5.9 km^{2})	Private act	1899	West
Dyersburg	Dyer County	16,164	17.47 sq mi (45.2 km^{2})	Private act	1850	West
Eagleville	Rutherford County	604	2.31 sq mi (6.0 km^{2})	Private act	1949	Middle
East Ridge	Hamilton County	22,167	8.28 sq mi (21.4 km^{2})	Home rule	1921	East
Eastview	McNairy County	705	4.89 sq mi (12.7 km^{2})	Mayor-alderman	1967	West
Elizabethton	Carter County	14,546	9.9 sq mi (26 km^{2})	Modified manager-council	1799	East
Elkton	Giles County	578	2.16 sq mi (5.6 km^{2})	Private act	1907	Middle
Englewood	McMinn County	1,532	1.82 sq mi (4.7 km^{2})	Private act	1919	East
Enville	Chester County; McNairy County	189	1.45 sq mi (3.8 km^{2})	Private act	1953	West
Erin	Houston County	1,324	4.09 sq mi (10.6 km^{2})	Private act	1909	Middle
Erwin	Unicoi County	6,083	4.04 sq mi (10.5 km^{2})	Private act	1903	East
Estill Springs	Franklin County	2,055	4.68 sq mi (12.1 km^{2})	Mayor-alderman	1948	Middle
Ethridge	Lawrence County	465	1.17 sq mi (3.0 km^{2})	Uniform manager-commission	1907	Middle
Etowah	McMinn County	3,490	2.92 sq mi (7.6 km^{2})	Home rule	1909	East
Fairview	Williamson County	9,357	16.92 sq mi (43.8 km^{2})	Uniform manager-commission	1959	Middle
Farragut	Knox County	23,506	16.2 sq mi (42 km^{2})	Mayor-alderman	1980	East
Fayetteville	Lincoln County	7,068	10.96 sq mi (28.4 km^{2})	Private act	1819	Middle
Finger	McNairy County	298	1.53 sq mi (4.0 km^{2})	Mayor-alderman	1970	West
Forest Hills	Davidson County	5,038	9.22 sq mi (23.9 km^{2})	Uniform manager-commission	1957	Middle
Franklin	Williamson County	83,454	41.45 sq mi (107.4 km^{2})	Private act	1799	Middle
Friendship	Crockett County	668	1.3 sq mi (3.4 km^{2})	Private act	1858	West
Friendsville	Blount County	913	3.01 sq mi (7.8 km^{2})	Private act	1953	East
Gadsden	Crockett County	470	1.09 sq mi (2.8 km^{2})	Private act	1868	West
Gainesboro	Jackson County	962	1.78 sq mi (4.6 km^{2})	Private act	1905	Middle
Gallatin	Sumner County	44,431	31.75 sq mi (82.2 km^{2})	Private act	1801	Middle
Gallaway	Fayette County	680	6.13 sq mi (15.9 km^{2})	Uniform manager-commission	1869	West
Garland	Tipton County	310	0.58 sq mi (1.5 km^{2})	Private act	1913	West
Gates	Lauderdale County	647	0.70 sq mi (1.8 km^{2})	Private act	1901	West
Gatlinburg	Sevier County	3,944	10.35 sq mi (26.8 km^{2})	Private act	1945	East
Germantown	Shelby County	41,333	20 sq mi (52 km^{2})	Private act	1841	West
Gibson	Gibson County	396	0.61 sq mi (1.6 km^{2})	Private act	1909	West
Gilt Edge	Tipton County	477	2.76 sq mi (7.1 km^{2})	Uniform manager-commission	1967	West
Gleason	Weakley County	1,445	2.28 sq mi (5.9 km^{2})	Private act	1903	West
Goodlettsville	Davidson County; Sumner County	17,789	14.32 sq mi (37.1 km^{2})	Uniform manager-commission	1858	Middle
Gordonsville	Smith County	1,213	7.11 sq mi (18.4 km^{2})	Private act	1909	Middle
Grand Junction	Hardeman County; Fayette County	325	1.18 sq mi (3.1 km^{2})	Private act	1901	West
Graysville	Rhea County	1,502	1.17 sq mi (3.0 km^{2})	Private act	1917	East
Greenback	Loudon County	1,064	8.09 sq mi (21.0 km^{2})	Mayor-alderman	1957	East
Greenbrier	Robertson County	6,898	7 sq mi (18 km^{2})	Private act	1937	Middle
Greeneville	Greene County	15,479	17.01 sq mi (44.1 km^{2})	Private act	1795	East
Greenfield	Weakley County	2,182	3.7 sq mi (9.6 km^{2})	Private act	1905	West
Gruetli-Laager	Grundy County	1,813	12.56 sq mi (32.5 km^{2})	Mayor-alderman	1980	East
Guys	McNairy County	466	11.72 sq mi (30.4 km^{2})	Mayor-alderman	1986	West
Halls	Lauderdale County	2,255	3.67 sq mi (9.5 km^{2})	Private act	1901	West
Harriman	Roane County	5,892	10.57 sq mi (27.4 km^{2})	Private act	1891	East
Harrogate	Claiborne County	4,389	7.63 sq mi (19.8 km^{2})	Mayor-alderman	1992	East
Hartsville	Trousdale County	11,615	116.64 sq mi (302.1 km^{2})	Consolidated city-county	1833	Middle
Henderson	Chester County	6,308	7.86 sq mi (20.4 km^{2})	Private act	1869	West
Hendersonville	Sumner County	61,753	36.93 sq mi (95.6 km^{2})	Mayor-alderman	1901	Middle
Henning	Lauderdale County	945	2.39 sq mi (6.2 km^{2})	Private act	1875	West
Henry	Henry County	464	1.45 sq mi (3.8 km^{2})	Private act	1907	West
Hickory Valley	Hardeman County	99	0.33 sq mi (0.85 km^{2})	Private act	1951	West
Hohenwald	Lewis County	3,757	5.35 sq mi (13.9 km^{2})	Private act	1911	Middle
Hollow Rock	Carroll County	718	1.79 sq mi (4.6 km^{2})	Private act	1869	West
Hornbeak	Obion County	424	0.7 sq mi (1.8 km^{2})	Private act	1923	West
Hornsby	Hardeman County	303	1.18 sq mi (3.1 km^{2})	Private act	1920	West
Humboldt	Gibson County	7,874	9.71 sq mi (25.1 km^{2})	Private act	1866	West
Huntingdon	Carroll County	3,985	11.94 sq mi (30.9 km^{2})	Private act	1849	West
Huntland	Franklin County	872	1.45 sq mi (3.8 km^{2})	Private act	1907	Middle
Huntsville	Scott County	1,248	3.93 sq mi (10.2 km^{2})	Mayor-alderman	1856	East
Jacksboro	Campbell County	2,020	2.54 sq mi (6.6 km^{2})	Mayor-alderman	1967	East
Jackson	Madison County	68,205	53.73 sq mi (139.2 km^{2})	Private act	1845	West
Jamestown	Fentress County	1,959	2.9 sq mi (7.5 km^{2})	Private act	1920	Middle
Jasper	Marion County	3,279	9.47 sq mi (24.5 km^{2})	Mayor-alderman	1852	East
Jefferson City	Jefferson County	8,419	6.43 sq mi (16.7 km^{2})	Private act	1901	East
Jellico	Campbell County	2,355	6.38 sq mi (16.5 km^{2})	Private act	1903	East
Johnson City	Washington County; Carter County; Sullivan County	71,046	43.27 sq mi (112.1 km^{2})	Home rule	1869	East
Jonesborough	Washington County	5,860	5.14 sq mi (13.3 km^{2})	Private act	1779	East
Kenton	Gibson County; Obion County	1,281	2.01 sq mi (5.2 km^{2})	Private act	1899	West
Kimball	Marion County	1,395	4.87 sq mi (12.6 km^{2})	Mayor-alderman	1962	East
Kingsport	Sullivan County; Hawkins County	55,442	50.75 sq mi (131.4 km^{2})	Private act	1917	East
Kingston	Roane County	5,953	7.85 sq mi (20.3 km^{2})	Private act	1799	East
Kingston Springs	Cheatham County	2,756	9.92 sq mi (25.7 km^{2})	Uniform manager-commission	1965	Middle
Knoxville	Knox County	190,740	104.17 sq mi (269.8 km^{2})	Home rule	1791	East
Lafayette	Macon County	5,584	4.76 sq mi (12.3 km^{2})	Private act	1843	Middle
LaFollette	Campbell County	7,430	4.91 sq mi (12.7 km^{2})	Private act	1897	East
La Grange	Fayette County	133	1.81 sq mi (4.7 km^{2})	Private act	1831	West
Lakeland	Shelby County	13,904	23.89 sq mi (61.9 km^{2})	Uniform manager-commission	1977	West
Lakesite	Hamilton County	1,826	1.68 sq mi (4.4 km^{2})	Uniform manager-commission	1972	East
La Vergne	Rutherford County	38,719	25.22 sq mi (65.3 km^{2})	Mayor-alderman	1972	Middle
Lawrenceburg	Lawrence County	11,633	12.67 sq mi (32.8 km^{2})	Private act	1825	Middle
Lebanon	Wilson County	38,431	38.64 sq mi (100.1 km^{2})	Private act	1801	Middle
Lenoir City	Loudon County	10,117	8.51 sq mi (22.0 km^{2})	Home rule	1907	East
Lewisburg	Marshall County	12,288	13.36 sq mi (34.6 km^{2})	Private act	1837	Middle
Lexington	Henderson County	7,956	12.42 sq mi (32.2 km^{2})	Private act	1824	West
Liberty	DeKalb County	310	1.12 sq mi (2.9 km^{2})	Private act	1850	Middle
Linden	Perry County	908	1.01 sq mi (2.6 km^{2})	Private act	1850	Middle
Livingston	Overton County	4,058	6.47 sq mi (16.8 km^{2})	Private act	1907	Middle
Lobelville	Perry County	897	3.92 sq mi (10.2 km^{2})	Mayor-alderman	1959	Middle
Lookout Mountain	Hamilton County	1,832	1.26 sq mi (3.3 km^{2})	Private act	1890	East
Loretto	Lawrence County	1,714	3.94 sq mi (10.2 km^{2})	Mayor-alderman	1949	Middle
Loudon	Loudon County	5,991	14.23 sq mi (36.9 km^{2})	Private act	1850	East
Louisville	Blount County	2,439	13.51 sq mi (35.0 km^{2})	Mayor-alderman	1990	East
Luttrell	Union County	1,074	3.92 sq mi (10.2 km^{2})	Private act	1925	East
Lynchburg	Moore County	6,461	130.42 sq mi (337.8 km^{2})	Consolidated city-county	1833	Middle
Lynnville	Giles County	287	0.33 sq mi (0.85 km^{2})	Private act	1838	Middle
Madisonville	Monroe County	5,132	6.21 sq mi (16.1 km^{2})	Private act	1866	East
Manchester	Coffee County	12,212	14.18 sq mi (36.7 km^{2})	Private act	1838	Middle
Martin	Weakley County	10,825	12.71 sq mi (32.9 km^{2})	Private act	1901	West
Maryville	Blount County	31,907	16.8 sq mi (44 km^{2})	Private act	1795	East
Mason	Tipton County	1,609	2.09 sq mi (5.4 km^{2})	Private act	1869	West
Maury City	Crockett County	674	1.13 sq mi (2.9 km^{2})	Private act	1911	West
Maynardville	Union County	2,413	5.46 sq mi (14.1 km^{2})	Uniform manager-commission	1870	East
McEwen	Humphreys County	1,750	1.87 sq mi (4.8 km^{2})	Private act	1917	Middle
McKenzie	Carroll County; Henry County; Weakley County	5,529	6.26 sq mi (16.2 km^{2})	Private act	1868	West
McLemoresville	Carroll County	352	2.58 sq mi (6.7 km^{2})	Private act	1949	West
McMinnville	Warren County	13,788	11.07 sq mi (28.7 km^{2})	Mayor-alderman	1868	Middle
Medina	Gibson County	5,126	3.17 sq mi (8.2 km^{2})	Private act	1907	West
Medon	Madison County	178	0.98 sq mi (2.5 km^{2})	Private act	1860	West
Memphis	Shelby County	633,104	324 sq mi (840 km^{2})	Home rule	1826	West
Michie	McNairy County	591	5.62 sq mi (14.6 km^{2})	Mayor-alderman	1961	West
Middleton	Hardeman County	706	1.92 sq mi (5.0 km^{2})	Private act	1901	West
Milan	Gibson County	8,171	8.91 sq mi (23.1 km^{2})	Private act	1866	West
Milledgeville	McNairy County; Chester County; Hardin County	265	1.61 sq mi (4.2 km^{2})	Mayor-alderman	1903	West
Millersville	Sumner County; Robertson County	6,299	13.71 sq mi (35.5 km^{2})	Uniform manager-commission	1981	Middle
Millington	Shelby County	10,582	31.75 sq mi (82.2 km^{2})	Private act	1903	West
Minor Hill	Giles County	537	1.72 sq mi (4.5 km^{2})	Mayor-alderman	1969	Middle
Mitchellville	Sumner County	189	0.52 sq mi (1.3 km^{2})	Private act	1909	Middle
Monteagle	Grundy County; Marion County	1,192	8.59 sq mi (22.2 km^{2})	Mayor-alderman	1962	Middle
Monterey	Putnam County	2,850	3.06 sq mi (7.9 km^{2})	Private act	1901	Middle
Morrison	Warren County	694	2.73 sq mi (7.1 km^{2})	Private act	1905	Middle
Morristown	Hamblen County	30,431	27.95 sq mi (72.4 km^{2})	Private act	1867	East
Moscow	Fayette County	556	1.25 sq mi (3.2 km^{2})	Private act	1860	West
Mosheim	Greene County	2,362	6.13 sq mi (15.9 km^{2})	Mayor-alderman	1974	East
Mount Carmel	Hawkins County	5,473	6.94 sq mi (18.0 km^{2})	Mayor-alderman	1961	East
Mount Juliet	Wilson County	39,289	19.79 sq mi (51.3 km^{2})	Home rule	1972	Middle
Mount Pleasant	Maury County	4,561	12.32 sq mi (31.9 km^{2})	Uniform manager-commission	1824	Middle
Mountain City	Johnson County	2,531	3.31 sq mi (8.6 km^{2})	Private act	1905	East
Munford	Tipton County	6,302	8.56 sq mi (22.2 km^{2})	Private act	1905	West
Murfreesboro	Rutherford County	152,769	55.49 sq mi (143.7 km^{2})	Private act	1817	Middle
Nashville	Davidson County	689,447	525.94 sq mi (1,362.2 km^{2})	Consolidated city-county	1806	Middle
New Hope	Marion County	1,082	10.4 sq mi (27 km^{2})	Mayor-alderman	1974	East
New Johnsonville	Humphreys County	1,951	7.08 sq mi (18.3 km^{2})	Private act	1949	Middle
New Market	Jefferson County	1,334	4.12 sq mi (10.7 km^{2})	Mayor-alderman	1911	East
New Tazewell	Claiborne County	3,037	5.13 sq mi (13.3 km^{2})	Mayor-alderman	1887	East
Newbern	Dyer County	3,313	4.88 sq mi (12.6 km^{2})	Private act	1858	West
Newport	Cocke County	6,868	5.53 sq mi (14.3 km^{2})	Private act	1799	East
Niota	McMinn County	719	2.19 sq mi (5.7 km^{2})	Private act	1911	East
Nolensville	Williamson County	13,829	7.44 sq mi (19.3 km^{2})	Mayor-alderman	1838	Middle
Normandy	Bedford County	141	0.23 sq mi (0.60 km^{2})	Private act	1858	Middle
Norris	Anderson County	1,491	7.19 sq mi (18.6 km^{2})	Private act	1949	East
Oak Hill	Davidson County	4,529	7.96 sq mi (20.6 km^{2})	Uniform manager-commission	1952	Middle
Oak Ridge	Anderson County; Roane County	31,402	89.98 sq mi (233.0 km^{2})	Home rule	1962	East
Oakdale	Morgan County	212	0.85 sq mi (2.2 km^{2})	Private act	1911	East
Oakland	Fayette County	8,936	10.29 sq mi (26.7 km^{2})	Private act	1919	West
Obion	Obion County	1,119	1.51 sq mi (3.9 km^{2})	Private act	1903	West
Oliver Springs	Anderson County; Morgan County; Roane County	3,231	5.56 sq mi (14.4 km^{2})	Private act	1903	East
Oneida	Scott County	3,752	9.49 sq mi (24.6 km^{2})	Private act	1905	East
Orlinda	Robertson County	859	6.7 sq mi (17 km^{2})	Uniform manager-commission	1965	Middle
Orme	Marion County	126	4.14 sq mi (10.7 km^{2})	Private act	1935	East
Palmer	Grundy County	672	4.94 sq mi (12.8 km^{2})	Private act	1925	Middle
Paris	Henry County	10,316	13.03 sq mi (33.7 km^{2})	Uniform manager-commission	1849	West
Parker's Crossroads	Henderson County	330	3.73 sq mi (9.7 km^{2})	Uniform manager-commission	1981	West
Parrottsville	Cocke County	263	0.74 sq mi (1.9 km^{2})	Private act	1923	East
Parsons	Decatur County	2,373	4.14 sq mi (10.7 km^{2})	Private act	1913	West
Pegram	Cheatham County	2,093	7.72 sq mi (20.0 km^{2})	Mayor-alderman	1972	Middle
Petersburg	Lincoln County; Marshall County	544	0.94 sq mi (2.4 km^{2})	Private act	1837	Middle
Philadelphia	Loudon County	656	1.6 sq mi (4.1 km^{2})	Mayor-alderman	1968	East
Pigeon Forge	Sevier County	6,343	13.21 sq mi (34.2 km^{2})	Uniform manager-commission	1961	East
Pikeville	Bledsoe County	1,608	2.44 sq mi (6.3 km^{2})	Private act	1911	East
Piperton	Fayette County	1,445	27.3 sq mi (71 km^{2})	Uniform manager-commission	1974	West
Pittman Center	Sevier County	502	6.07 sq mi (15.7 km^{2})	Mayor-alderman	1974	East
Plainview	Union County	2,125	6.5 sq mi (17 km^{2})	Mayor-alderman	1992	East
Pleasant Hill	Cumberland County	563	1.56 sq mi (4.0 km^{2})	Private act	1903	East
Pleasant View	Cheatham County	4,149	12.52 sq mi (32.4 km^{2})	Mayor-alderman	1921	Middle
Portland	Sumner County	13,156	14.28 sq mi (37.0 km^{2})	Private act	1905	Middle
Powell's Crossroads	Marion County	1,322	5.04 sq mi (13.1 km^{2})	Mayor-alderman	1976	East
Pulaski	Giles County	8,397	7.22 sq mi (18.7 km^{2})	Private act	1809	Middle
Puryear	Henry County	671	0.92 sq mi (2.4 km^{2})	Private act	1909	West
Ramer	McNairy County	319	1.71 sq mi (4.4 km^{2})	Uniform manager-commission	1958	West
Red Bank	Hamilton County	11,899	6.52 sq mi (16.9 km^{2})	Home rule	1945	East
Red Boiling Springs	Macon County	1,112	1.75 sq mi (4.5 km^{2})	Private act	1953	Middle
Ridgely	Lake County	1,795	1.71 sq mi (4.4 km^{2})	Private act	1909	West
Ridgeside	Hamilton County	390	0.17 sq mi (0.44 km^{2})	Private act	1925	East
Ridgetop	Robertson County; Davidson County	1,874	2.91 sq mi (7.5 km^{2})	Private act	1935	Middle
Ripley	Lauderdale County	7,800	12.85 sq mi (33.3 km^{2})	Private act	1838	West
Rives	Obion County	326	0.35 sq mi (0.91 km^{2})	Private act	1905	West
Rockford	Blount County	856	3.21 sq mi (8.3 km^{2})	Uniform manager-commission	1970	East
Rockwood	Roane County	5,444	8.07 sq mi (20.9 km^{2})	Private act	1903	East
Rocky Top	Anderson County; Campbell County	1,781	1.59 sq mi (4.1 km^{2})	Private act	1939	East
Rogersville	Hawkins County	4,420	3.4 sq mi (8.8 km^{2})	Private act	1903	East
Rossville	Fayette County	664	5.06 sq mi (13.1 km^{2})	Private act	1903	West
Rutherford	Gibson County	1,151	2.3 sq mi (6.0 km^{2})	Private act	1799	West
Rutledge	Grainger County	1,122	4.69 sq mi (12.1 km^{2})	Mayor-alderman	1797	East
St. Joseph	Lawrence County	782	3.52 sq mi (9.1 km^{2})	Uniform manager-commission	1870	Middle
Saltillo	Hardin County	303	0.92 sq mi (2.4 km^{2})	Private act	1951	West
Samburg	Obion County	217	0.82 sq mi (2.1 km^{2})	Private act	1909	West
Sardis	Henderson County	381	2.4 sq mi (6.2 km^{2})	Private act	1859	West
Saulsbury	Hardeman County	112	0.36 sq mi (0.93 km^{2})	Private act	1849	West
Savannah	Hardin County	7,213	6.52 sq mi (16.9 km^{2})	Private act	1833	West
Scotts Hill	Henderson County; Decatur County	984	3.77 sq mi (9.8 km^{2})	Private act	1917	West
Selmer	McNairy County	4,396	9.79 sq mi (25.4 km^{2})	Private act	1901	West
Sevierville	Sevier County	17,889	24.24 sq mi (62.8 km^{2})	Home rule	1795	East
Sharon	Weakley County	944	1.13 sq mi (2.9 km^{2})	Private act	1901	West
Shelbyville	Bedford County	23,557	18.61 sq mi (48.2 km^{2})	Private act	1819	Middle
Signal Mountain	Hamilton County	8,852	7.66 sq mi (19.8 km^{2})	Private act	1919	East
Silerton	Hardeman County; Chester County	111	0.66 sq mi (1.7 km^{2})	Private act	1923	West
Slayden	Dickson County	178	1.34 sq mi (3.5 km^{2})	Private act	1913	Middle
Smithville	DeKalb County	5,004	5.91 sq mi (15.3 km^{2})	Private act	1843	Middle
Smyrna	Rutherford County	53,070	29.71 sq mi (76.9 km^{2})	Private act	1869	Middle
Sneedville	Hancock County	1,387	2.3 sq mi (6.0 km^{2})	Mayor-alderman	1850	East
Soddy-Daisy	Hamilton County	13,070	23.44 sq mi (60.7 km^{2})	Uniform manager-commission	1969	East
Somerville	Fayette County	3,094	12.53 sq mi (32.5 km^{2})	Private act	1854	West
South Carthage	Smith County	1,322	2.71 sq mi (7.0 km^{2})	Mayor-alderman	1963	Middle
South Fulton	Obion County	2,354	3.3 sq mi (8.5 km^{2})	Uniform manager-commission	1903	West
South Pittsburg	Marion County	2,992	6 sq mi (16 km^{2})	Private act	1901	East
Sparta	White County	4,925	6.74 sq mi (17.5 km^{2})	Private act	1841	Middle
Spencer	Van Buren County	1,601	6.87 sq mi (17.8 km^{2})	Private act	1846	Middle
Spring City	Rhea County	1,981	2.64 sq mi (6.8 km^{2})	Uniform manager-commission	1953	East
Spring Hill	Maury County; Williamson County	50,005	27.11 sq mi (70.2 km^{2})	Mayor-alderman	1837	Middle
Springfield	Robertson County	18,782	13.34 sq mi (34.6 km^{2})	Private act	1796	Middle
Stanton	Haywood County	452	0.51 sq mi (1.3 km^{2})	Private act	1927	West
Stantonville	McNairy County	283	1.11 sq mi (2.9 km^{2})	Mayor-alderman	1966	West
Sunbright	Morgan County	552	3.78 sq mi (9.8 km^{2})	Mayor-alderman	1990	East
Surgoinsville	Hawkins County	1,801	5.61 sq mi (14.5 km^{2})	Mayor-alderman	1815	East
Sweetwater	Monroe County; McMinn County	6,312	8.52 sq mi (22.1 km^{2})	Home rule	1901	East
Tazewell	Claiborne County	2,218	4.43 sq mi (11.5 km^{2})	Mayor-alderman	1801	East
Tellico Plains	Monroe County	880	1.94 sq mi (5.0 km^{2})	Private act	1911	East
Tennessee Ridge	Houston County; Stewart County	1,368	3.71 sq mi (9.6 km^{2})	Uniform manager-commission	1960	Middle
Thompson's Station	Williamson County	7,485	18.76 sq mi (48.6 km^{2})	Mayor-alderman	1990	West
Three Way	Madison County	1,709	4.54 sq mi (11.8 km^{2})	Mayor-alderman	1998	West
Tiptonville	Lake County	4,464	2.05 sq mi (5.3 km^{2})	Private act	1907	West
Toone	Hardeman County	364	1.05 sq mi (2.7 km^{2})	Private act	1903	West
Townsend	Blount County	448	2.17 sq mi (5.6 km^{2})	Private act	1921	East
Tracy City	Grundy County	1,481	4.91 sq mi (12.7 km^{2})	Private act	1915	Middle
Trenton	Gibson County	4,264	8.2 sq mi (21 km^{2})	Private act	1846	West
Trezevant	Carroll County	859	1.39 sq mi (3.6 km^{2})	Private act	1911	West
Trimble	Dyer County; Obion County	637	0.65 sq mi (1.7 km^{2})	Private act	1905	West
Troy	Obion County	1,371	1.49 sq mi (3.9 km^{2})	Private act	1901	West
Tullahoma	Coffee County; Franklin County	20,339	23.56 sq mi (61.0 km^{2})	Private act	1858	Middle
Tusculum	Greene County	2,663	4.81 sq mi (12.5 km^{2})	Uniform manager-commission	1959	East
Unicoi	Unicoi County	3,632	16.41 sq mi (42.5 km^{2})	Mayor-alderman	1994	East
Union City	Obion County	11,170	11.94 sq mi (30.9 km^{2})	Modified manager-council	1867	West
Vanleer	Dickson County	395	0.65 sq mi (1.7 km^{2})	Private act	1913	Middle
Viola	Warren County	131	0.17 sq mi (0.44 km^{2})	Private act	1901	Middle
Vonore	Monroe County	1,474	11.93 sq mi (30.9 km^{2})	Mayor-alderman	1965	East
Walden	Hamilton County	1,898	3.58 sq mi (9.3 km^{2})	Mayor-alderman	1975	East
Wartburg	Morgan County	918	0.96 sq mi (2.5 km^{2})	Mayor-alderman	1905	East
Wartrace	Bedford County	651	0.69 sq mi (1.8 km^{2})	Private act	1858	Middle
Watauga	Carter County	458	0.83 sq mi (2.1 km^{2})	Uniform manager-commission	1960	East
Watertown	Wilson County	1,477	1.31 sq mi (3.4 km^{2})	Private act	1905	Middle
Waverly	Humphreys County	4,105	8.77 sq mi (22.7 km^{2})	Private act	1838	Middle
Waynesboro	Wayne County	2,449	3.75 sq mi (9.7 km^{2})	Uniform manager-commission	1850	Middle
Westmoreland	Sumner County	2,206	3.94 sq mi (10.2 km^{2})	Private act	1901	Middle
White Bluff	Dickson County	3,206	5.93 sq mi (15.4 km^{2})	Private act	1869	Middle
White House	Sumner County; Robertson County	12,982	10.99 sq mi (28.5 km^{2})	Mayor-alderman	1921	Middle
White Pine	Jefferson County	2,196	2.64 sq mi (6.8 km^{2})	Private act	1915	East
Whiteville	Hardeman County	4,638	2.75 sq mi (7.1 km^{2})	Private act	1901	West
Whitwell	Marion County	1,699	3.39 sq mi (8.8 km^{2})	Home rule	1956	East
Williston	Fayette County	395	1.62 sq mi (4.2 km^{2})	Uniform manager-commission	1970	West
Winchester	Franklin County	9,375	11.71 sq mi (30.3 km^{2})	Private act	1821	Middle
Winfield	Scott County	967	6.35 sq mi (16.4 km^{2})	Mayor-alderman	1983	East
Woodbury	Cannon County	2,680	2.01 sq mi (5.2 km^{2})	Private act	1838	Middle
Woodland Mills	Obion County	378	1.23 sq mi (3.2 km^{2})	Mayor-alderman	1968	West
Yorkville	Gibson County	286	1.42 sq mi (3.7 km^{2})	Uniform manager-commission	1848	West

== Notes ==
- All but one of Tennessee's county seats are municipalities. The exception is Blountville, county seat of Sullivan County.
- For municipalities located in more than one county, the primary county (according to U.S. Census) is listed first.

== See also ==
- List of census-designated places in Tennessee
- List of counties in Tennessee
