= Tennessee State Route 125 =

Highway in Tennessee

State Route 125
- SR 125; primary in red, secondary in blue

Route information
- Maintained by TDOT
- Length: 37.36 mi (60.13 km)

Major junctions
- South end: MS 15 at the Mississippi state line near Middleton
- SR 57 in Middleton; US 64 / SR 18 in Bolivar
- North end: SR 100 north of Silerton

Location
- Country: United States
- State: Tennessee
- Counties: Hardeman, Chester

Highway system
- Tennessee State Routes; Interstate; US; State
← SR 124	→ SR 126

State Route 125 (SR 125) is a north–south state route in southern West Tennessee. It begins north of Silerton at SR 100 and ends at the Tennessee–Mississippi state line, where it continues as Mississippi Highway 15.

== Route description ==
=== Hardeman County ===
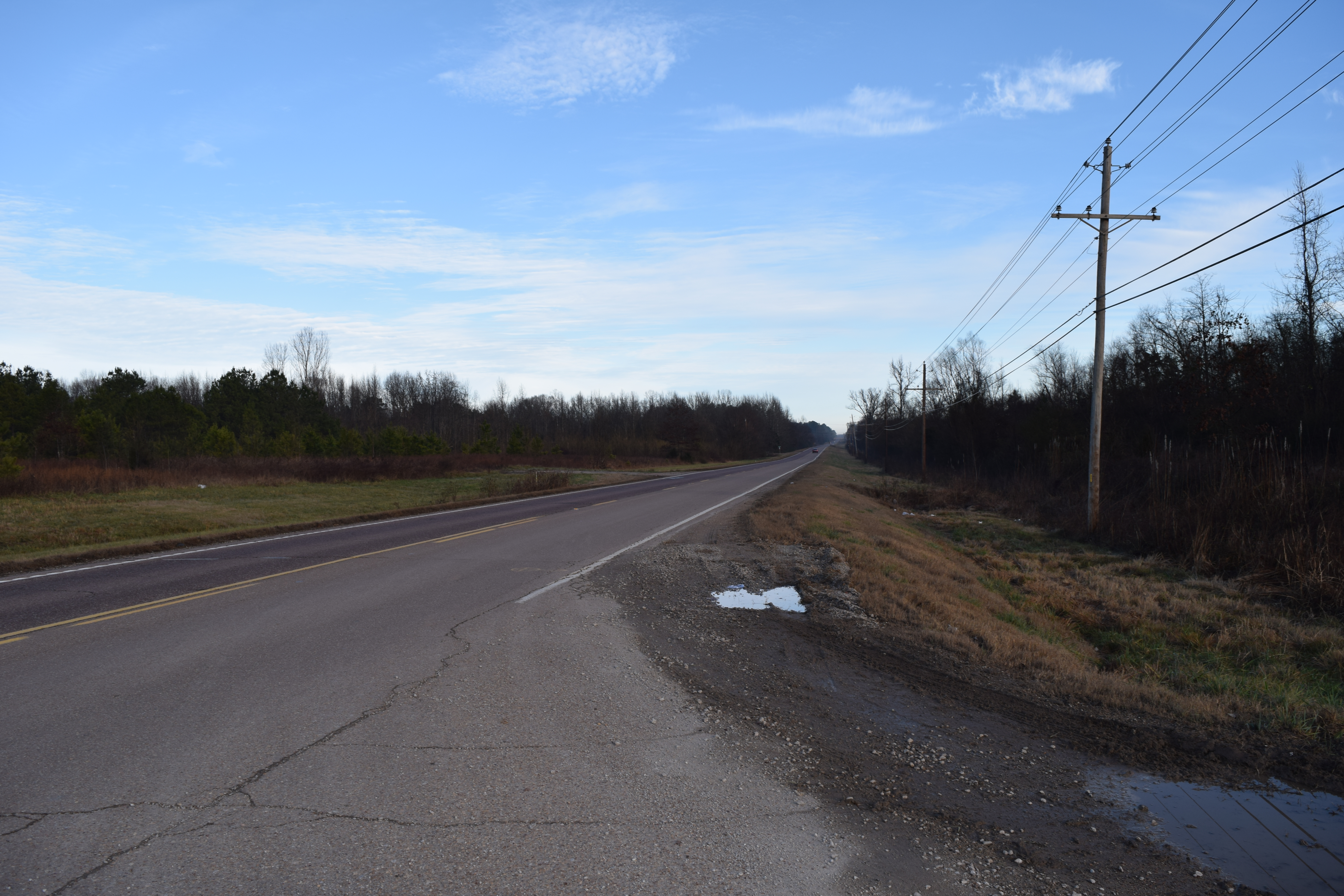
Looking north along SR 125 near the Mississippi border

SR 125 begins as a primary highway in Hardeman County at the Mississippi state line, where the road continues south as Mississippi Highway 15 (MS 15). It goes north as a 2-lane highway past several industrial businesses before entering Middleton and having an intersection with SR 57. SR 125 then goes north past several more businesses before crossing the railroad tracks and passing through downtown. The highway then leaves Middleton and continues north through rural areas for approximately 12 miles (19 km) before entering Bolivar. The highway passes through a couple of neighborhoods before going through a wooded area to enter downtown, where it comes to an intersection with US 64/SR 15 and SR 18, SR 125 then becomes concurrent with SR 18 and they go north through some more neighborhoods before leaving Bolivar and crossing the Hatchie River. The highway then enters rural areas again and come to a Y-Intersection where SR 18 continues north while SR 125 downgrades to a secondary highway and turns east. For the next several miles, SR 125 winds its way through the countryside to Silerton, where it turns north and crosses into Chester County.

=== Chester County ===
SR 125 continues to wind its way through countryside, crossing several creeks before passing through a wooded area, where it climbs over a ridge and some steep grades, just shortly before coming to an end at a Y-Intersection with SR 100, directly beside Chickasaw State Park.

== Major intersections ==
County	Location	mi	km	Destinations	Notes
Hardeman		0.0	0.0	MS 15 south – Walnut	Mississippi state line; southern terminus; SR 125 begins as a primary highway
Hardeman	Middleton	3.2	5.1	SR 57 (W/E Tennessee Avenue) – Grand Junction, Saulsbury, Ramer, Eastview	
Hardeman	Bolivar	19.7	31.7	US 64 / SR 18 south (W/E Market Street/SR 15) – Whiteville, Hickory Valley, Hornsby, Selmer	Southern end of SR 18 concurrency
Hardeman	Bolivar	21.3	34.3	Bridge over the Hatchie River	
Hardeman		22.9	36.9	SR 18 north – Toone, Medon, Jackson	Northern end of SR 18 concurrency; SR 125 downgrades to a secondary highway
Chester		37.36	60.13	SR 100 – Whiteville, Toone, Henderson	Northern terminus; SR 125 ends as a secondary highway
1.000 mi = 1.609 km; 1.000 km = 0.621 mi: Concurrency terminus
