= Tennessee State Route 18 =

State highway in Tennessee, United States

State Route 18
- SR 18 mainline in red

Route information
- Maintained by TDOT
- Length: 46.35 mi (74.59 km)
- Existed: October 1, 1923–present

Major junctions
- South end: MS 7 at the Mississippi State Line near La Grange
- US 64 at Bolivar; SR 100 near Toone
- North end: US 45 at Jackson

Location
- Country: United States
- State: Tennessee
- Counties: Fayette, Hardeman, Madison

Highway system
- Tennessee State Routes; Interstate; US; State
← SR 17	→ SR 19

State Route 18 (SR 18) is a primary state highway in south-central West Tennessee. SR 18 is a two-lane facility throughout the majority of its length through the state with, the exception the part in Bolivar. SR 18 has a short concurrency with US 64 and also with SR 125 at Bolivar.

== Route description ==
=== Fayette County ===
SR 18 begins in extreme southeastern Fayette County in West Tennessee at the northern terminus of Mississippi Highway 7, approximately 1.2 miles (1.9 km) north of Michigan City, Mississippi, as a rural two-lane route. This route continues in a northeasterly direction through rural Fayette County and briefly overlaps with SR 57 at the communities of La Grange and Grand Junction near the Hardeman County line.

=== Hardeman County ===
At Bolivar, SR 18 continues its northeasterly trek through the city as Tennessee Street and is also overlapped with US 64. SR 18 is a four-lane undivided highway while overlapped with US 64 and passes nearby the site of the Western State Mental Health Institute on the western outskirts of the city. At the Hardeman County Courthouse, SR 18 breaks away from US 64 and turns left on North Main Street. Also at this location, SR 125 begins a 3.12-mile (5.02 km) hidden overlap with SR 18 at the courthouse. Outside the Bolivar city limits, SR 18/SR 125 continue north through the Hatchie River bottoms before reaching the community of Shandy. At Shandy, the SR 18/SR 125 overlap ends with SR 125 turning north on Silerton Road toward Chickasaw State Park. SR 18 in northern Hardeman County traverses sparsely populated farmland and swampland and intersects with SR 138 and SR 100. The junction of SR 18 and SR 100 is a grade-separated diamond interchange where SR 18 expands briefly to a four-lane divided highway. North of this intersection, SR 18 resumes its northbound routing towards Jackson as a rural two-lane highway.

=== Madison County ===
SR 18 continues as a two-lane route through rural southwestern Madison County and passes through the community of Medon and Malesus just south of the Jackson city limits. In Jackson, the route ends at an expansive signalized intersection with US 45 and hidden SR 5, known locally as South Highland Avenue.

== History ==
Little has changed along SR 18 since its designation as a state route. SR 18 originally had an alternate route near Grand Junction which was called State Route 18A (SR 18A). This entire route was renamed SR 368 during the 1983 renumbering.

SR 18 roughly follows the original route of the Mississippi Central Railroad.

== Future ==
In Hardeman County, an Environmental Impact Statement is currently underway to determine the feasibility of widening SR 18 from its current two-lane status to a divided four-lane highway. This work is part of a larger effort by TDOT to widen SR 18 from Bolivar north to Jackson as directed in House Joint Resolution 16 of the 98th Tennessee General Assembly.

== Major intersections ==
County	Location	mi	km	Destinations	Notes
Fayette		0.00	0.00	MS 7 south – Holly Springs	Continuation into Mississippi
Fayette	La Grange	3.97	6.39	SR 57 west – Moscow, Memphis	Southern end of SR 57 overlap
Fayette	La Grange	4.25	6.84	SR 57 east – Grand Junction, Eastview	To Pickwick Landing State Park, Northern end of SR 57 overlap
Hardeman	Grand Junction	6.27	10.09	SR 368 south – Grand Junction	Old SR 18 ALT; northern terminus of SR 368
Hardeman	Bolivar	22.92	36.89	US 64 west (W Market Street/SR 15) – Somerville, Memphis	Southern end of US 64 overlap
Hardeman	Bolivar	23.63	38.03	US 64 east (E Market Street/SR 15) / SR 125 south (Main Street) – Selmer	Northern end of the overlap with US 64; southern end of hidden overlap with SR 125
Hardeman		26.75	43.05	SR 125 north (Silerton Road) – Silerton	Northern end of SR 125 overlap; to Chickasaw State Park
Hardeman		30.00	48.28	SR 138 north (Pine Top Road) – Toone	Southern terminus of SR 138
Hardeman		32.46	52.24	SR 100 – Whiteville, Henderson	Interchange
Madison	Medon	39.52	63.60	Riverside Drive	
Madison	Jackson	47.06	75.74	US 45 (South Highland Avenue/SR 5) – Henderson, Downtown	Northern terminus
1.000 mi = 1.609 km; 1.000 km = 0.621 mi: Concurrency terminus
