= Tennessee State Route 368 =

State highway in Tennessee, United States

State Route 368
- TN 368 highlighted in red

Route information
- Maintained by TDOT
- Length: 1.7 mi (2.7 km)
- Existed: July 1, 1983–present

Major junctions
- South end: SR 57 in Grand Junction
- North end: SR 18 north of Grand Junction

Location
- Country: United States
- State: Tennessee
- Counties: Hardeman

Highway system
- Tennessee State Routes; Interstate; US; State
← SR 367	→ SR 369

State Route 368 (SR 368) is a Tennessee designated state route in Grand Junction, Tennessee. It is approximately 1.7 miles (2.7 km) long.

== Route description ==
SR 368 begins as a fork in the road from SR 18 just north of town and travels nearly due south, intercepting Old Grand Junction Road and Summit Street. From this point it runs slightly parallel to the rarely used Mississippi Central Railroad and Tippah Street. It intercepts SR 57 as a T-junction in downtown Grand Junction and stops there.

== History ==
SR 368 was originally designated as Tennessee State Route 18A (SR 18A). The generally accepted theory for why this was done is that the road runs nearly parallel to SR 18, and only goes a short distance, ending in Grand Junction. SR 18A was redesignated as SR 368 during the 1983 renumbering.

== Major intersections ==
The entire route is in Hardeman County.

Location	mi	km	Destinations	Notes
Grand Junction	0.0	0.0	SR 57 – La Grange, Saulsbury	Southern terminus
	1.7	2.7	SR 18 – Holly Springs, MS, Hickory Valley, Bolivar	Northern terminus
1.000 mi = 1.609 km; 1.000 km = 0.621 mi

== See also ==
- Tennessee State Route 18
- Tennessee State Route 57
- Grand Junction, Tennessee
- Mississippi Central Railroad
