= Tennessee State Route 57 =

State highway in Tennessee, United States

State Route 57
- SR 57; primary in red, secondary in blue

Route information
- Maintained by TDOT
- Length: 109.61 mi (176.40 km)
- Existed: October 1, 1923–present

Major junctions
- West end: SR 14 in Memphis
- SR 1 in Memphis; Sam Cooper Boulevard in Memphis; US 64 / US 70 / US 72 / US 79 in Memphis; I-240 in Memphis; US 72 in Collierville; I-269 in Piperton; US 45 in Eastview
- East end: MS 25 at the Mississippi state line in Red Sulphur Springs

Location
- Country: United States
- State: Tennessee
- Counties: Shelby, Fayette, Hardeman, McNairy, Hardin

Highway system
- Tennessee State Routes; Interstate; US; State
← SR 56	→ US 58

State Route 57 (SR 57) is an east–west highway that runs from Memphis to the Mississippi state line near Pickwick Dam and Pickwick Landing State Park. Except for in Shelby County and western Fayette County, SR 57 is a two-lane road generally with a 55 mph (89 km/h) speed limit. The majority of the road follows the path of the Memphis and Charleston Railroad (now part of the Norfolk Southern Railway).

SR 57 is signed as a primary highway for most of its length, excluding the section between its western terminus and the split with US 72 in Collierville, which is secondary.

== Route description ==
=== Shelby County ===
SR 57 starts in Memphis by going south on Trezevant Street from SR 14 (Jackson Avenue). Trezevant St. turns into East Parkway (at an intersection with SR 1) and follows US 70/US 79/US 64 and SR 277. They have an intersection with Sam Cooper Boulevard before SR 57 turns east and follows US 72 along Poplar Avenue, where it starts to follow the Norfolk Southern Railway to the north. Poplar Avenue has an interchange with I-240 in East Memphis and soon enters Germantown, where it is briefly overlapped with SR 177. As the road enters Collierville, it becomes known as West Poplar Avenue (instead of Poplar Avenue). SR 57 meets Byhalia Road (which becomes Mississippi Highway 309 (MS 309) at the Mississippi state line) as a crossroads. Just east of that intersection US 72 diverges from SR 57 by going southeast into Mississippi, via unsigned SR 86, while SR 57 continues east along West Poplar Ave. SR 57 becomes a two-lane road but remains at a 40 mph (64 km/h) speed until it exits Collierville. East of the Collierville town square, it becomes East Poplar Avenue and SR 205 (Collierville-Arlington Road) has its southern terminus at SR 57.

Poplar Avenue is a major thoroughfare through Shelby County and has much commercial development along its route. In the city of Memphis, the road is locally known for its narrow lanes of traffic and hazardous storm grates along its edges. The many freight trains that run along the side of it cause several traffic delays throughout the day.

=== Fayette County ===
When SR 57 enters Fayette County, the speed limit increases to 55 mph (89 km/h) and except for when the road passes through a town, it remains at this speed until it ends in Mississippi. Just outside Collierville, SR 57 has an interchange with I-269. In the city of Piperton, SR 57 intersects with SR 196 and crosses over the Norfolk Southern Railway. A few miles down the road, it passes through Rossville and is the southern terminus for SR 194. SR 57 passes over the Wolf River and passes through Moscow. The southern terminus of SR 76 occurs in Moscow. Several miles down the road from here, SR 57 passes through LaGrange. Motorists can view several of the town's historic buildings from the road. East of LaGrange, SR 57 turns left along SR 18, passes over the Norfolk Southern Railway again, and then continues east.

==== Former alignment ====
A former alignment of SR 57 exists for 1.2 miles (1.9 km) in Piperton. The former route exits SR 57 heading south as Commerce Road, and after approximately 450 feet (140 m) turns eastward into West Old State Line Road. Old State Line Road then briefly turns into SR 196 before becoming East Old State Line Road. After 1/2 mile (0.80 km), East Old State Line Road turns slightly left before reentering SR 57.

=== Hardeman County ===
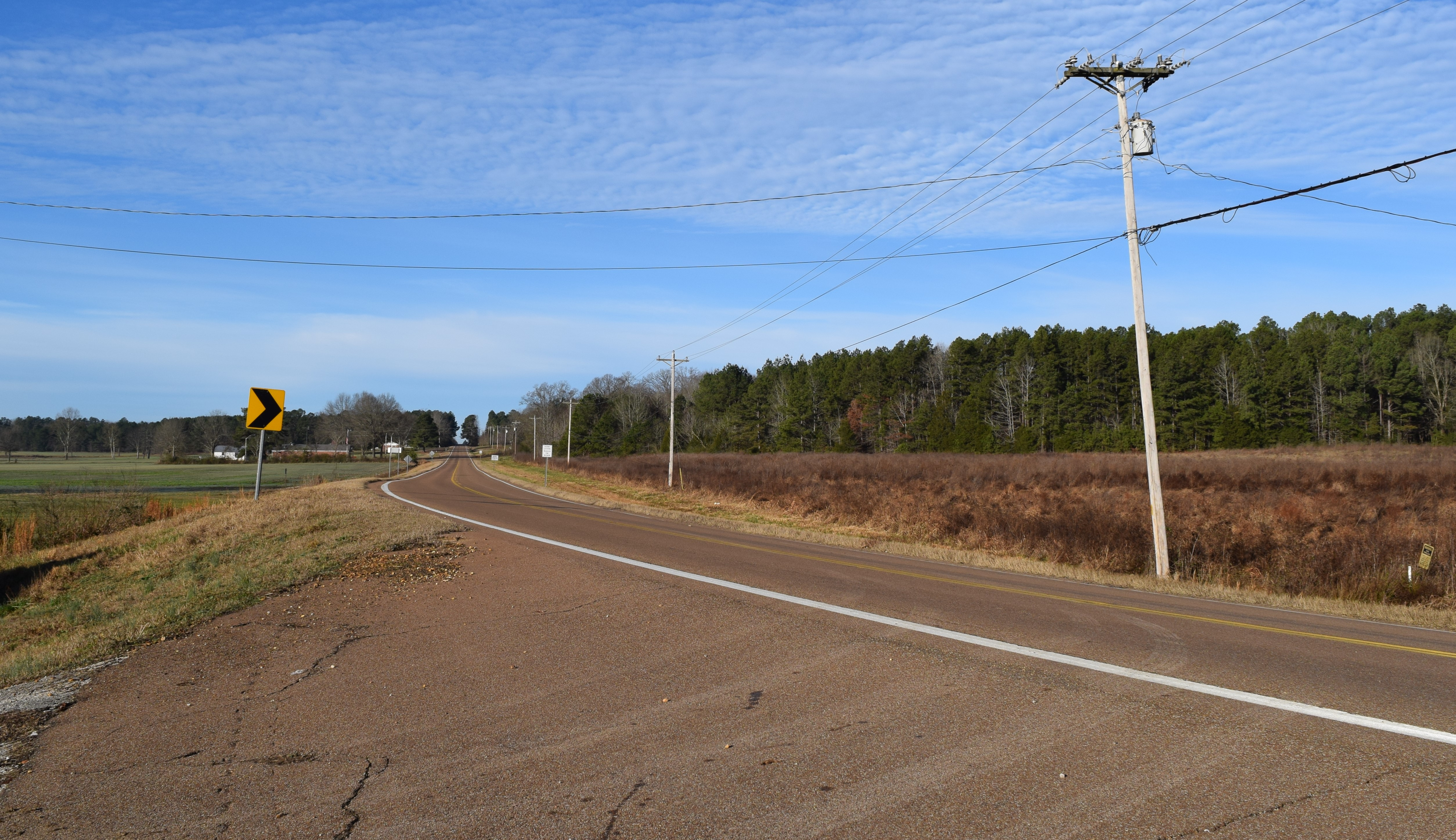
SR 57 in Pocahontas

After splitting from SR 18, SR 57 enters Hardeman County and also enters Grand Junction. It is home to the National Bird Dog Museum, which is visible from the road. SR 57 crosses over the Mississippi Central Railroad and junctions with SR 368. Several miles east is the town of Saulsbury. East of Saulsbury, SR 57 passes over the Norfolk Southern Railway for a third time, and continues east to Middleton. Here, it intersects with SR 125 and crosses the Mississippi Tennessee Railroad. East of Middleton, SR 57 goes through the town of Pocahontas, where it passes over the Norfolk Southern Railway for the fourth and final time. The railroad continues southeast into Mississippi while SR 57 continues east. It also passes over the Hatchie River around Pocahontas.

=== McNairy County ===
SR 57 enters McNairy County and passes north of Big Hill Pond State Park. SR 57 passes through Ramer, where it is the northern terminus of SR 234. It also crosses over the West Tennessee Railroad (also owned by Norfolk Southern Railway). SR 57 continues east and crosses US 45 near the town of Eastview. after crossing US 45, SR 57 goes north of the town of Michie and intersects with SR 224. East of Michie, the road junctions with SR 22, which is the most direct route to Shiloh National Military Park.

=== Hardin County ===
SR 57 passes into Hardin County and intersects with SR 142 west of the town of Counce. When SR 57 enters the town of Counce, it crosses a railroad spur of the Kansas City Southern Railway. East of the town, the road intersects with SR 128 in Pickwick Village. SR 128 goes north over Pickwick Dam, and SR 57 turns right and heads south toward Pickwick Landing State Park. SR 57 continues south along Pickwick Lake for approximately five miles (8.0 km) until it crosses into Mississippi and becomes Mississippi Highway 25 (MS 25).

== Major intersections ==
County	Location	mi	km	Destinations	Notes
Shelby	Memphis	0.0	0.0	SR 14 (Jackson Avenue)	Western terminus; SR 57 begins as a secondary highway
Shelby	Memphis			US 64 east / US 70 east / US 79 north (Summer Avenue/SR 1 east) / SR 1 west (North Parkway)	Western end of US 64/US 70/US 79 overlap; northern terminus of unsigned SR 277; western end of unsigned SR 277 concurrency
Shelby	Memphis			Sam Cooper Boulevard east to I-40 / I-240 – Nashville	Western terminus of Sam Cooper Boulevard
Shelby	Memphis			US 64 west / US 70 west / US 79 south (East Parkway N/SR 277 south) / US 72 begins	Western terminus of US 72; eastern end of US 64/US 70/US 79/SR 277 concurrency; western end of US 72 overlap
Shelby	Memphis			SR 23 (Walnut Grove Road/Union Avenue)	Interchange; eastbound exit and westbound entrance
Shelby	Memphis			I-240 – Nashville, Jackson, Miss.	I-240 exits 15 A-B
Shelby	Germantown			SR 177 (Germantown Road)	
Shelby	Collierville			SR 175 west (South Byhalia Road)	Eastern terminus of SR 175
Shelby	Collierville			US 72 east (SR 86 east) – Corinth, MS	Eastern end of US 72 overlap; western terminus of unsigned SR 86; SR 57 turns primary
Shelby	Collierville			SR 205 north (Collierville Arlington Road) – Fisherville, Arlington	Southern terminus of SR 205
Fayette	Piperton			I-269 – Arlington, Memphis, Tunica Miss	I-269 exit 3
Fayette	Piperton			SR 196 – Hickory Withe, Downtown Piperton	
Fayette	Rossville			SR 194 north (Church Street) – Downtown Rossville, Oakland	Southern terminus of SR 194
Fayette	Moscow			Dr. M.B. Feemsteer Bridge over the Wolf River	
Fayette	Moscow			SR 76 north – Somerville, Brownsville	Southern terminus of SR 76
Fayette	La Grange			SR 18 south – Holly Springs, MS	Western end of SR 18 overlap
Fayette	Grand Junction			SR 18 north – Bolivar, Jackson	Eastern end of SR 19 overlap
Hardeman	Grand Junction			SR 368 north	Southern terminus of SR 368
Hardeman	Middleton			SR 125 (South Main Street) – Bolivar, Walnut, MS	
Hardeman	Pocahontas			Bridge over the Hatchie River	
McNairy	Ramer			SR 234 south (Chewalla Road) – Chewalla	Northern terminus of SR 234
McNairy	Eastview			US 45 (SR 5) – Selmer, Guys, Corinth, MS	
McNairy	Michie			SR 224 (Michie Pebble Hill Road) – Stantonville, Adamsville, Downtown Michie	
McNairy	Michie			SR 22 – Crump, Shiloh National Military Park, Corinth	
Hardin	Southside			SR 142 south (Kendrick Road) – Farmington, MS	Western end of SR 142 overlap
Hardin	Southside			SR 142 north – Shiloh National Military Park	Eastern end of SR 142 overlap
Hardin	Pickwick Dam			SR 128 north – Pickwick Landing Dam, Savannah	Southern terminus of SR 128
Hardin	Red Sulphur Springs	109.61	176.40	MS 25 south – Iuka	Mississippi state line; eastern terminus; SR 57 ends as a primary highway
1.000 mi = 1.609 km; 1.000 km = 0.621 mi: Concurrency terminus; Incomplete access
