= Deanburg, Tennessee =

Unincorporated community in Tennessee, US

Coordinates: 35°24′44″N 88°48′21″W

Deanburg is an unincorporated community in western Chester County and southwestern Madison County, Tennessee, US. Located between Chickasaw State Park and Medon (roughly 35° 24' 39"N, 88° 48' 14"W), it lies around 440–560 ft. (135–170 m) above sea level. The average annual temperature is about 60 °F (16 °C), and the average annual precipitation is about 51 inches (130 cm).

Deanburg lies in the drainage basin of the Forked Deer River and was traditionally a farming community, growing row crops such as cotton and soybeans in the fertile local loam, with a few areas used for pasture and hay land, fallow fields or woodlots. Nearly all arable land in Deanburg has been cultivated for generations. In many areas the overlying loess has been removed by severe erosion. It is now part of the Jackson, Tennessee metropolitan area, and many of its residents commute to Jackson or to jobs in other suburbs. It has two Baptist churches (Bethel and Deanburg) and a community center.

There was at one time a Deanburg School at 35°24′46′′ N, 08°84′83.3′′ W.
