= Essary Springs, Tennessee =

- Census-designated place
- Location within Tennessee Location within the United States
- Coordinates: 35°0′43″N 88°47′52″W
- Country: United States
- State: Tennessee
- County: Hardeman

Area
  - Total: 4.13 sq mi (10.69 km^{2})
  - Land: 4.13 sq mi (10.69 km^{2})
  - Water: 0 sq mi (0.00 km^{2})
- Elevation: 440 ft (130 m)

Population (2020)
  - Total: 147
  - Density: 35.6/sq mi (13.75/km^{2})
- Time zone: UTC-6 (Central (CST))
  - Summer (DST): UTC-5 (CDT)
- ZIP Code: 38061 (Pocahontas)
- Area code: 731
- FIPS code: 47-24400
- GNIS feature ID: 2813083

Essary Springs is an unincorporated community and census-designated place (CDP) in Hardeman County, Tennessee, United States. It was first listed as a CDP prior to the 2020 census.

It is in the southeast corner of the county, bordered to the east by McNairy County and to the south by the state of Mississippi. It is 3 miles (5 km) south of Pocahontas and 9 miles (14 km) southeast of Middleton. The Hatchie River flows south to north through the community, eventually turning west to join the Mississippi River west of Covington.

== Demographics ==
Historical population
Census	Pop.	Note	%±
2020	147		—
U.S. Decennial Census
