= Steve Hamer =

American basketball player (born 1973)

Personal information
- Born: November 13, 1973 (age 53) Grand Junction, Tennessee, U.S.
- Listed height: 7 ft 0 in (2.13 m)
- Listed weight: 245 lb (111 kg)

Career information
- High school: Middleton (Middleton, Tennessee)
- College: Tennessee (1992–1996)
- NBA draft: 1996: 2nd round, 38th overall pick
- Drafted by: Boston Celtics
- Playing career: 1996–2003
- Position: Center
- Number: 42

Career history
- 1996–1997: Boston Celtics

Career highlights
- 2× Second-team All-SEC (1995, 1996); Tennessee Mr. Basketball (1992)
- Stats at NBA.com
- Stats at Basketball Reference

Steve Ray Hamer (born November 13, 1973) is an American former professional basketball player. He had a brief National Basketball Association career.

== Playing career ==
The 7-foot center played at the University of Tennessee. He was the #38 pick in the second round of the 1996 NBA draft by the Boston Celtics and appeared in 35 games (starting three) during the 1996–97 NBA season for the 15–67 Boston Celtics.
