= Tennessee State Route 177 =

State highway in Tennessee, United States

State Route 177
- Germantown Road; Germantown Parkway; West Street
- SR 177 highlighted in red

Route information
- Maintained by TDOT
- Length: 13.11 mi (21.10 km)
- Existed: July 1, 1983–present

Major junctions
- South end: Winchester Rd in Memphis
- US 72 / SR 57 in Germantown; I-40 in Memphis; US 64 in Bartlett
- North end: US 70 / US 79 in Bartlett

Location
- Country: United States
- State: Tennessee
- Counties: Shelby

Highway system
- Tennessee State Routes; Interstate; US; State
← SR 176	→ SR 178

State Route 177 (SR 177) is a secondary state highway in Shelby County, Tennessee. The majority of the route is known as Germantown Road and Germantown Parkway. Despite its secondary designation, the road serves as the major north-south corridor in the eastern Memphis suburbs. A portion of SR 177 carries eight through lanes, making it one of the widest non-controlled-access highways in Tennessee.

== Route description ==
SR 177 starts in southeast Memphis on Winchester Road near SR 385 (Bill Morris Parkway) with a speed limit of 40 miles per hour (64 km/h). From there it runs north through the city of Germantown with a speed limit of 35 miles per hour (56 km/h) until it intersects with US 72/SR 57 where the speed limit rises to 40. It then crosses the Wolf River where the speed limit rises to 45 miles per hour (72 km/h) and passes back into Memphis through the Cordova community. SR 177 later intersects I-40 (Exit 16) near the Wolfchase Galleria. SR 177 crosses US 64/SR 15 (Stage Road) in Bartlett, before terminating as a state route at US 70/US 79/SR 1. Germantown Road continues north until Old Brownsville Road near the Brunswick community.

Beginning at the US 72/SR 57 intersection, SR 177 turns from a two-lane road into a six-lane highway, and continues in this form through to its north terminus, and from the Wolf River bridge until the I-40 junction, the road is six lanes and has 10-foot-wide (3.0 m) paved outside shoulders on both sides, which only occasionally give way to a fourth lane or a right-turn lane. It also has a grassed median from the Wolf River to US 64. North of I-40 until US 64, the road has four lanes in each direction. North of US 64 until the route terminates, the road has three lanes in each direction.

== History ==
Prior to 1990, SR 177 was two lanes throughout its length. After 1990, the route was expanded into its current form from US 72/SR 57 to the I-40–US 64 area. In the late 1990s, it was expanded to its current form between US 64 to US 70/US 79. Germantown Parkway, as it is known locally, has seen significant commercial and residential development starting in the 1990s, including the establishment of restaurants, hotels, planned communities, and the Wolfchase Galleria. North of US 64, however, little new development has taken place besides the addition of a few residential subdivisions, a school, and a Walgreens near US 70/US 79.

The speed limit between the Wolf River and I-40 was 50 miles per hour (80 km/h) until 2014 when the city of Memphis lowered it to 45 miles per hour (72 km/h), possibly due to increasing traffic counts.

== Future ==
Construction to widen a portion of SR 177 from Stout Road to Crestridge Road to five lanes has been completed. Also, the portion of SR 177 that overlaps Poplar Avenue was modified in 2013 to allow for two left turn lanes at both the Poplar/West St and Poplar/Germantown Pkwy intersections. This is to complement the new two left turn lanes at Germantown and Farmington.

== Junction list ==
The entire route is in Shelby County.

Location	mi	km	Destinations	Notes
Memphis	0.00	0.00	Winchester Road to SR 385 (Bill Morris Parkway) – Memphis, Collierville	Southern terminus
Germantown	3.01	4.84	US 72 / SR 57 (Poplar Avenue) – Collierville, Memphis	
Memphis			Walnut Grove Road	Single-point urban interchange
Memphis	10.04	16.16	I-40 – Memphis, Nashville	I-40 exit 16
Bartlett	10.83	17.43	US 64 (Stage Road/SR 15) – Bartlett, Raleigh, Oakland, Somerville	
Bartlett	13.13	21.13	US 70 / US 79 (SR 1) – Memphis, Arlington, Brownsville	Northern terminus
1.000 mi = 1.609 km; 1.000 km = 0.621 mi
