= Medon, Tennessee =

- City
- Location of Medon in Madison County, Tennessee.
- Coordinates: 35°27′31″N 88°52′2″W
- Country: United States
- State: Tennessee
- County: Madison, Hardeman

Area
  - Total: 1.00 sq mi (2.58 km^{2})
  - Land: 0.99 sq mi (2.57 km^{2})
  - Water: 0.0039 sq mi (0.01 km^{2})
- Elevation: 466 ft (142 m)

Population (2020)
  - Total: 189
  - Density: 190.3/sq mi (73.49/km^{2})
- Time zone: UTC-6 (Central (CST))
  - Summer (DST): UTC-5 (CDT)
- ZIP code: 38356
- Area code: 731
- FIPS code: 47-47020
- GNIS feature ID: 1293534

Medon is a city in Madison County and Hardeman County. It is included in the Jackson, Tennessee Metropolitan Statistical Area. As of the 2020 census, Medon had a population of 189.

== Geography ==
Medon is located on State Route 18 between Jackson and Bolivar, north of Chickasaw State Park and north-northwest of Deanburg, at 35°27′31″N 88°52′02″W.

== History ==
By 1886, about three hundred people were living in the area of Medon, which was formed along the Illinois Central Railroad ten miles south of Jackson; a high school had been incorporated there in 1881 and the area was surrounded by a rich agricultural community. The school was incorporated into South Side High School in 1956.

== Demographics ==
Historical population
Census	Pop.	Note	%±
1880	153		—
1920	114		—
1930	117		2.6%
1940	97		−17.1%
1950	115		18.6%
1960	97		−15.7%
1970	136		40.2%
1980	169		24.3%
1990	137		−18.9%
2000	191		39.4%
2010	178		−6.8%
2020	189		6.2%

=== Racial and ethnic composition ===
Medon, Tennessee – Racial and ethnic composition Note: the US Census treats Hispanic/Latino as an ethnic category. This table excludes Latinos from the racial categories and assigns them to a separate category. Hispanics/Latinos may be of any race.
Race / Ethnicity (NH = Non-Hispanic)	Pop 2000	Pop 2010	Pop 2020	% 2010	% 2010	% 2020
White alone (NH)	175	166	167	91.62%	93.26%	88.36%
Black or African American alone (NH)	11	9	12	5.76%	5.06%	6.35%
Native American or Alaska Native alone (NH)	1	2	0	0.52%	1.12%	0.00%
Asian alone (NH)	1	0	2	0.52%	0.00%	1.06%
Pacific Islander alone (NH)	0	0	0	0.00%	0.00%	0.00%
Some Other Race alone (NH)	0	0	0	0.00%	0.00%	0.00%
Mixed Race or Multi-Racial (NH)	3	0	5	1.57%	0.00%	2.65%
Hispanic or Latino (any race)	0	1	3	0.00%	0.56%	1.59%
Total	191	178	189	100.00%	100.00%	100.00%

=== 2020 census ===
As of the 2020 census, Medon had a population of 189. The median age was 46.5 years. 20.1% of residents were under the age of 18 and 25.9% of residents were 65 years of age or older. For every 100 females there were 83.5 males, and for every 100 females age 18 and over there were 101.3 males age 18 and over.

0.0% of residents lived in urban areas, while 100.0% lived in rural areas.

There were 85 households in Medon, of which 31.8% had children under the age of 18 living in them. Of all households, 40.0% were married-couple households, 21.2% were households with a male householder and no spouse or partner present, and 29.4% were households with a female householder and no spouse or partner present. About 18.9% of all households were made up of individuals and 10.6% had someone living alone who was 65 years of age or older.

There were 89 housing units, of which 4.5% were vacant. The homeowner vacancy rate was 0.0% and the rental vacancy rate was 0.0%.

Racial composition as of the 2020 census
Race	Number	Percent
White	167	88.4%
Black or African American	12	6.3%
American Indian and Alaska Native	0	0.0%
Asian	2	1.1%
Native Hawaiian and Other Pacific Islander	0	0.0%
Some other race	2	1.1%
Two or more races	6	3.2%
Hispanic or Latino (of any race)	3	1.6%

=== 2000 census ===
As of the 2000 census, there was a population of 191, with 78 households and 60 families residing in the city. The population density was 196.3 inhabitants per square mile (75.8/km^{2}). There were 83 housing units at an average density of 85.3 per square mile (32.9/km^{2}). The racial makeup of the city was 91.62% White, 5.76% African American, 0.52% Native American, 0.52% Asian, and 1.57% from two or more races.

There were 78 households, out of which 33.3% had children under the age of 18 living with them, 56.4% were married couples living together, 16.7% had a female householder with no husband present, and 21.8% were non-families. 20.5% of all households were made up of individuals, and 9.0% had someone living alone who was 65 years of age or older. The average household size was 2.45 and the average family size was 2.80.

In the city, the population was spread out, with 24.1% under the age of 18, 6.3% from 18 to 24, 23.0% from 25 to 44, 30.9% from 45 to 64, and 15.7% who were 65 years of age or older. The median age was 42 years. For every 100 females, there were 85.4 males. For every 100 females age 18 and over, there were 79.0 males.

The median income for a household in the city was $26,750, and the median income for a family was $27,813. Males had a median income of $30,208 versus $21,875 for females. The per capita income for the city was $13,313. About 15.2% of families and 17.9% of the population were below the poverty line, including 39.5% of those under the age of eighteen and none of those 65 or over.

== Economy ==
Medon was traditionally a farming community. It is now part of the Jackson, Tennessee metropolitan area, and many of its residents commute to Jackson or to jobs in other suburbs.
