= Silerton, Tennessee =

- Town
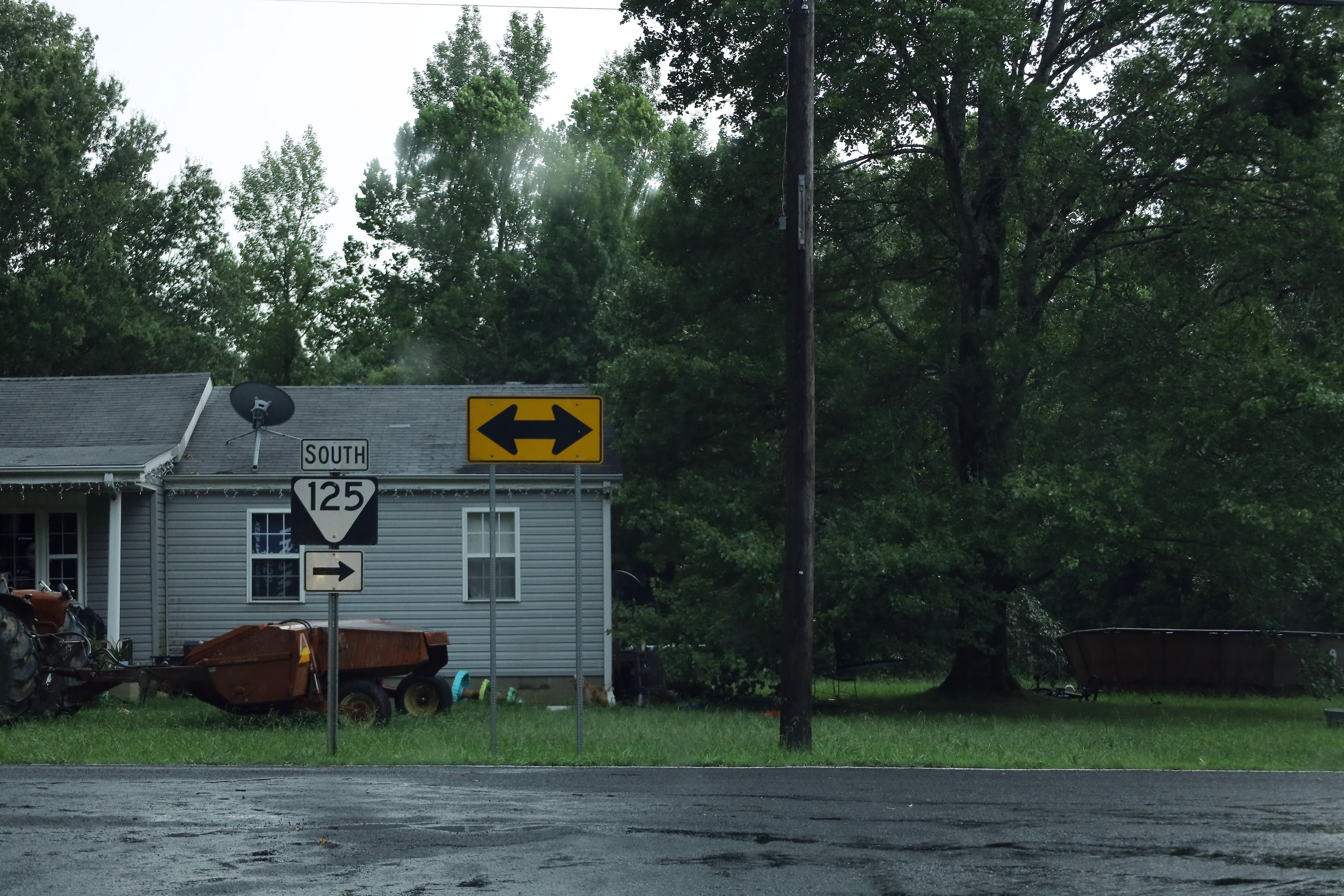
- Silerton, Tennessee

- Location of Silerton in Chester County, Tennessee.
- Coordinates: 35°20′25″N 88°48′22″W
- Country: United States
- State: Tennessee
- Counties: Hardeman, Chester

Area
  - Total: 0.67 sq mi (1.73 km^{2})
  - Land: 0.67 sq mi (1.73 km^{2})
  - Water: 0 sq mi (0.00 km^{2})
- Elevation: 449 ft (137 m)

Population (2020)
  - Total: 97
  - Density: 145.3/sq mi (56.09/km^{2})
- Time zone: UTC-6 (Central (CST))
  - Summer (DST): UTC-5 (CDT)
- ZIP code: 38377
- Area code: 731
- FIPS code: 47-68560
- GNIS feature ID: 1303620

Silerton is a town in Hardeman and Chester counties in the western part of Tennessee. As of the 2020 census, Silerton had a population of 97.

== History ==
In 1869, Jesse, Spencer, Horace, and Jame Siler, sons of Solomon Siler, and John, Josiah, James, and Edward Siler, the sons of James Siler, purchased the land after moving from Siler City, North Carolina. There they raised their families, many of whom are still related to Silerton residents today. With the arrival of the Gulf, Mobile and Northern Railroad in 1917, Silerton became a railroad town. The depot would be named after the Siler family, many of whom maintained important businesses in the area. Eventually, the town's name would be changed to "Silerton" to avoid confusion with the nearby town of Serles. The town would also grow into a venue for the timber trade. In 1923, Silerton was incorporated as a municipality by a private act of the state legislature.

== Geography ==
Silerton is located in northeastern Hardeman County, though a small part of the town extends east into Chester County.

Tennessee State Route 125 passes through the town, leading southwest 14 miles (23 km) to Bolivar, the Hardeman County seat, and north 4 miles (6 km) to TN 100.

According to the United States Census Bureau, the town has a total area of 0.66 square miles (1.7 km^{2}), all land.

== Demographics ==
Historical population
Census	Pop.	Note	%±
1930	88		—
1940	291		230.7%
1950	121		−58.4%
1960	84		−30.6%
1970	88		4.8%
1980	100		13.6%
1990	59		−41.0%
2000	60		1.7%
2010	111		85.0%
2020	97		−12.6%

As of the census of 2000, there were 60 people, 28 households, and 15 families residing in the town. The population density was 149.4 inhabitants per square mile (57.7/km^{2}). There were 34 housing units at an average density of 84.7 per square mile (32.7/km^{2}). The racial makeup of the town was 100% White.

There were 28 households, out of which 25.0% had children under the age of 18 living with them, 46.4% were married couples living together, 7.1% had a female householder with no husband present, and 42.9% were non-families. 39.3% of all households were made up of individuals, and 28.6% had someone living alone who was 65 years of age or older. The average household size was 2.14, and the average family size was 2.69.

In the town, the population was spread out, with 23.3% under the age of 18, 3.3% from 18 to 24, 26.7% from 25 to 44, 25.0% from 45 to 64, and 21.7% who were 65 years of age or older. The median age was 43 years. For every 100 females, there were 87.5 males. For every 100 females age 18 and over, there were 100.0 males.

The median income for a household in the town was $17,083, and the median income for a family was $25,417. Males had a median income of $24,583 versus $12,000 for females. The per capita income for the town was $25,571. There were 33.3% of families and 19.1% of the population living below the poverty line, including 28.6% of those under eighteen and 30.8% of those over 64.

== Arts and culture ==
Silerton hosts two annual events: a Fourth of July celebration in the summer and a Children's Christmas Parade in December.

== Government ==
Silerton is governed by a mayor and four aldermen, whom are elected every four years.
