= Grand Junction, Tennessee =

- City
- Location of Grand Junction in Fayette County, Tennessee.
- Coordinates: 35°2′53″N 89°11′25″W
- Country: United States
- State: Tennessee
- Counties: Hardeman, Fayette
- Founded: 1854

Government
  - Type: Board of Aldermen
  - Mayor: Curtis Lane
  - Vice Mayor: James Holder

Area
  - Total: 1.19 sq mi (3.07 km^{2})
  - Land: 1.19 sq mi (3.07 km^{2})
  - Water: 0 sq mi (0.00 km^{2})
- Elevation: 571 ft (174 m)

Population (2020)
  - Total: 338
  - Density: 284.7/sq mi (109.94/km^{2})
- Time zone: UTC-6 (Central (CST))
  - Summer (DST): UTC-5 (CDT)
- ZIP code: 38039
- Area codes: 731, 901
- FIPS code: 47-30280
- GNIS feature ID: 1285817
- Website: www.grandjunctiontn.com

Grand Junction is a city on the border between Hardeman and Fayette County, Tennessee, United States. As of the 2020 census, Grand Junction had a population of 338.

It has been called the "Bird Dog Capital of the World" and serves as the location of the National Bird Dog Museum.

== History ==
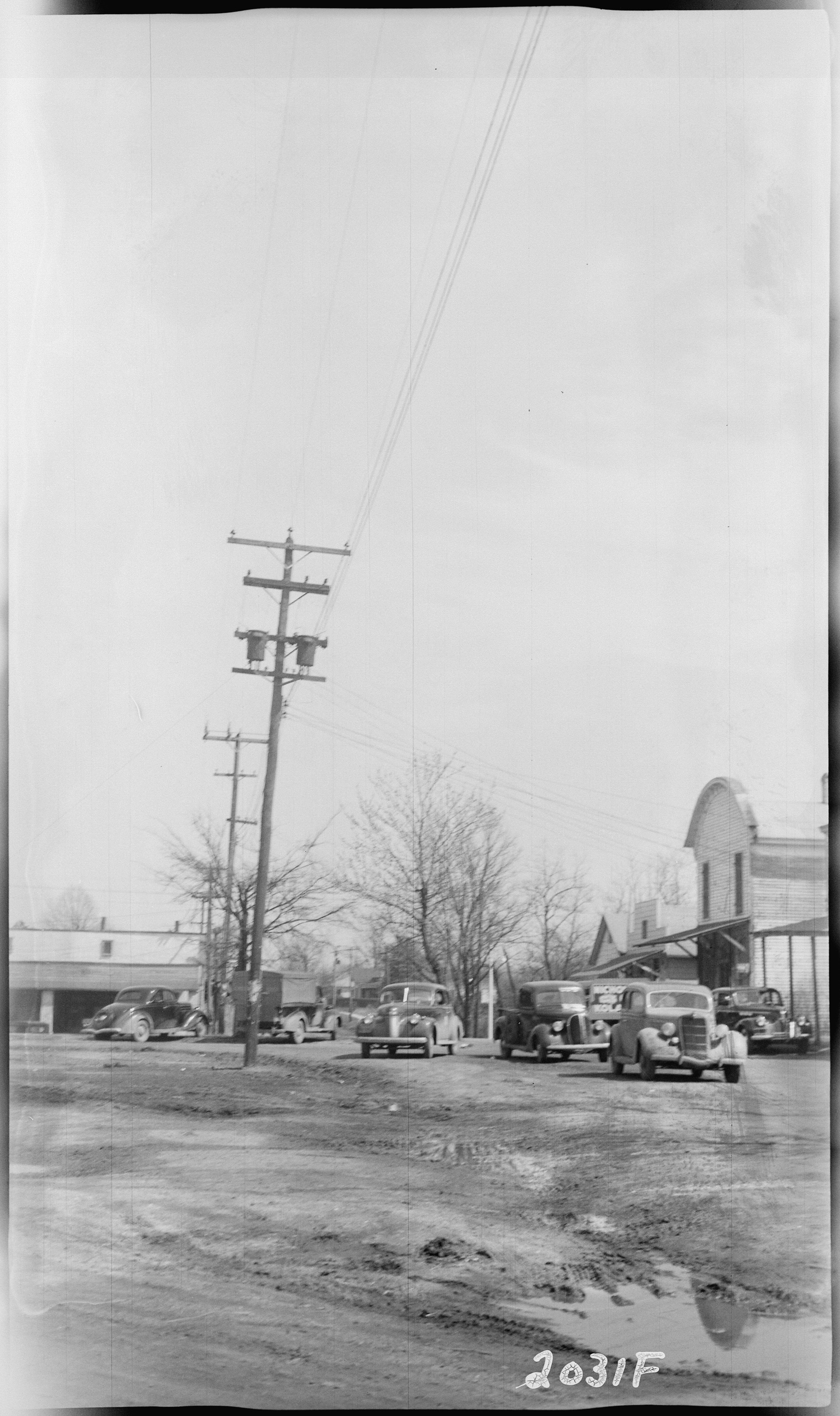
Grand Junction in 1940

Grand Junction was founded in 1858. It was named after the "Grand Junction" of the Memphis and Charleston Railroad and the Mississippi Central Railroad. The town was a railroad town, with its own newspaper, two saloons, three hotels, a livery stable, and other businesses. During the Civil War, the Union Army held the city for approximately three years. Also during the Civil War General U.S. Grant established a “Contraband Camp” of thousands of former enslaved people, providing shelter, education etc. prior to the Emancipation Proclamation.

In 1878 a yellow fever epidemic struck the town and killed more than half of the 150 residents. The town was incorporated in 1901.

On April 3, 2025, the community was struck by an EF3 tornado that had originated in the Slayden, Mississippi area.

== Geography ==
Grand Junction is located in southwestern Hardeman County at 35°2′53″N 89°11′25″W (35.048023, -89.190177). A small portion of the town extends west into Fayette County. Tennessee State Route 57 runs through the city, leading east 17 miles (27 km) to Middleton and west 3.5 miles (5.6 km) to La Grange. Collierville, on the outskirts of the Memphis suburbs, is 28 miles (45 km) to the west on TN 57. Tennessee State Route 18 runs past the western edge of Grand Junction, leading northeast 19 miles (31 km) to Bolivar and southwest 4 miles (6.4 km) to the Mississippi border, beyond which Mississippi Highway 7 continues southwest 20 miles (32 km) to Holly Springs. Tennessee State Route 368 is a local highway that runs through downtown Grand Junction.

According to the United States Census Bureau, the city has a total area of 1.2 square miles (3.1 km^{2}), all land.

=== Climate ===
Grand Junction has a humid subtropical climate, with four distinct seasons. The summer months (late May to late September) are persistently hot and humid due to moisture encroaching from the Gulf of Mexico, with afternoon temperatures frequently above 90 degrees Fahrenheit. Afternoon thunderstorms are frequent during some summers, but usually brief, lasting no longer than an hour. Early autumn is drier and mild, but can remain hot until late October. Abrupt but short-lived cold snaps are common. Late autumn is rainy and colder, December being the third rainiest month of the year. Fall foliage becomes especially vibrant after the first frost, typically early November, and lasts until early December. Winters are mild, but cold snaps can occur. Mild spells sometimes occur January and February. Snowfall is not abundant but does occur during most winters, with one or two major winter weather events occurring by the end of March. Spring often begins in late February or early March, following the onset of a sharp warmup. This season is also known as "severe weather season" due to the higher frequency of tornadoes, hail, and thunderstorms producing winds greater than 58 mph (93 km/h). Average rainfall is slightly higher during the spring months than the rest of the year. Historically, April is the month with the highest frequency of tornadoes, though tornadoes have occurred every month of the year. Grand Junction-area historical tornado activity is above Tennessee state average, and 155% greater than the overall U.S. average. Grand Junction is sunny about 62.5% of the time.

== Demographics ==
Historical population
Census	Pop.	Note	%±
1860	311		—
1870	460		47.9%
1880	467		1.5%
1900	393		—
1910	491		24.9%
1920	497		1.2%
1930	524		5.4%
1940	560		6.9%
1950	477		−14.8%
1960	446		−6.5%
1970	427		−4.3%
1980	360		−15.7%
1990	365		1.4%
2000	301		−17.5%
2010	325		8.0%
2020	338		4.0%

=== Racial and ethnic composition ===
Grand Junction, Tennessee – Racial and ethnic composition Note: the US Census treats Hispanic/Latino as an ethnic category. This table excludes Latinos from the racial categories and assigns them to a separate category. Hispanics/Latinos may be of any race.
Race / Ethnicity (NH = Non-Hispanic)	Pop 2000	Pop 2010	Pop 2020	% 2000	% 2010	% 2020
White alone (NH)	176	196	154	58.47%	60.31%	45.56%
Black or African American alone (NH)	119	122	169	39.53%	37.54%	50.00%
Native American or Alaska Native alone (NH)	1	1	4	0.33%	0.31%	1.18%
Asian alone (NH)	0	0	1	0.00%	0.00%	0.30%
Pacific Islander alone (NH)	0	0	0	0.00%	0.00%	0.00%
Other race alone (NH)	0	0	1	0.00%	0.00%	0.30%
Mixed race or Multiracial (NH)	2	6	3	0.66%	1.85%	0.89%
Hispanic or Latino (any race)	3	0	6	1.00%	0.00%	1.78%
Total	301	325	338	100.00%	100.00%	100.00%

=== 2020 census ===
As of the 2020 census, Grand Junction had a population of 338. The median age was 46.5 years, with 24.0% of residents under the age of 18 and 21.6% aged 65 or older; for every 100 females there were 82.7 males, and for every 100 females age 18 and over there were 90.4 males.

There were 150 households in Grand Junction, of which 26.7% had children under the age of 18 living in them. Of all households, 36.0% were married-couple households, 24.0% were households with a male householder and no spouse or partner present, and 34.7% were households with a female householder and no spouse or partner present. About 32.7% of all households were made up of individuals and 20.0% had someone living alone who was 65 years of age or older.

There were 166 housing units, of which 9.6% were vacant. The homeowner vacancy rate was 3.4% and the rental vacancy rate was 11.6%.

0.0% of residents lived in urban areas, while 100.0% lived in rural areas.

=== 2000 census ===
As of the census of 2000, there was a population of 301, with 125 households and 86 families residing in the city. The population density was 255.4 inhabitants per square mile (98.6/km^{2}). There were 142 housing units at an average density of 120.5 per square mile (46.5/km^{2}). The racial makeup of the city was 58.47% White, 40.53% African American, 0.33% Native American, and 0.66% from two or more races. Hispanic or Latino of any race were 1.00% of the population.

There were 125 households, out of which 24.0% had children under the age of 18 living with them, 51.2% were married couples living together, 16.8% had a female householder with no husband present, and 30.4% were non-families. 27.2% of all households were made up of individuals, and 19.2% had someone living alone who was 65 years of age or older. The average household size was 2.41 and the average family size was 2.97.

In the city, the population was spread out, with 25.6% under the age of 18, 6.3% from 18 to 24, 23.3% from 25 to 44, 25.2% from 45 to 64, and 19.6% who were 65 years of age or older. The median age was 40 years. For every 100 females, there were 81.3 males. For every 100 females age 18 and over, there were 73.6 males.

The median income for a household in the city was $29,306, and the median income for a family was $36,375. Males had a median income of $33,750 versus $20,469 for females. The per capita income for the city was $13,304. About 8.4% of families and 11.1% of the population were below the poverty line, including 16.3% of those under the age of eighteen and 7.4% of those 65 or over. Most of those below the poverty line receive federal aid.

== Economy ==
A. Schulman has a manufacturing facility in Grand Junction. The town has many small local businesses, including a clothing boutique, antique shops, two local banks, several convenience stores, a Dollar General store, and a Family Dollar store.

== Arts and culture ==
The National Bird Dog Museum (NBDM) is located in Grand Junction, as is the Field Trial Hall of Fame and Wildlife Heritage Center, which shares space with the NBDM. The location of the NBDM and the history of the area in regards to hunting has earned the town the title of the "Bird Dog Capital of the World". Ames Plantation, the former home of Hobart Ames, is also located in the area. The town is also home to the National Field Trial Championships, which are held at Ames Plantation. Grand Junction's library serves area residents and consists of 2 staff members and volunteers. As of 2011, over 1,380 patrons visited the library, checking out items over 3,300 times. The Wilder Community Center serves as a community hall and senior center. Grand Junction also has one of the oldest and most active Ruritan clubs in Tennessee.

=== Annual events ===
A Christmas parade is held each year with a tree-lighting ceremony. There is also an annual BBQ Cookoff contest help each year in April that draws a large crowd and plenty of contestants vying for the "Golden Pig".

=== Other notable landmarks ===
Many of the original buildings are still maintained within Grand Junction. Rogers and Sons Marble Works, established in 1879, is still standing and the old railroad depot still exists. N.T. Richardson's General Merchandise Store is still standing and stocked from when it finally closed, which was run by N.T. Richardson until his death at 104 years old.

== Education ==
Grand Junction has one elementary school, Grand Junction Elementary School, as well as a Head Start Program. There is also a newly renovated local library with meeting areas for different events.

== Media ==
Although in a rural area, Grand Junction has many local television and radio stations able to be received by residents with basic outdoor antennas. Eleven television stations are available over the air in Grand Junction, and over sixteen radio stations are also able to be received.

== Infrastructure ==
=== Major thoroughfares ===
- State Route 57
- State Route 18
- State Route 368

=== Utilities ===
The Bolivar Electric Company and Hardeman/Fayette Utility District provide electricity and gas, respectively. The city handles waste disposal, sewage and water needs. Comcast provides cable services, internet and phone services, and AT&T provides landline phone service, internet and television services.

== Notable people ==
- Bobby Parks, basketball player
- Thomas Hearns, boxer
- Steve Hamer, NBA basketball player
