= Guys, Tennessee =

- Town
- Location of Guys in McNairy County, Tennessee.
- Coordinates: 35°1′23″N 88°32′48″W
- Country: United States
- State: Tennessee
- County: McNairy

Area
  - Total: 11.42 sq mi (29.57 km^{2})
  - Land: 11.39 sq mi (29.50 km^{2})
  - Water: 0.027 sq mi (0.07 km^{2})
- Elevation: 443 ft (135 m)

Population (2020)
  - Total: 414
  - Density: 36.3/sq mi (14.03/km^{2})
- Time zone: UTC-6 (Central (CST))
  - Summer (DST): UTC-5 (CDT)
- ZIP code: 38339
- Area code: 731
- FIPS code: 47-31680
- GNIS feature ID: 1286465

Guys is a town in McNairy County, Tennessee. As of the 2020 census, Guys had a population of 414.

== Geography ==
Guys is located at 35°1′23″N 88°32′48″W (35.022989, -88.546564).

According to the United States Census Bureau, the town has a total area of 11.7 square miles (30 km^{2}), of which 11.7 square miles (30 km^{2}) is land and 0.04 square miles (0.10 km^{2}) (0.26%) is water.

Guys has a border with the town of Eastview to the north of it. It had 763 people in the 2020 census.

== Newspaper ==
Guys's newspaper is the Independent Appeal, which serves all of McNairy County. It was founded in 1902. It is located at 111 N. 2nd St. in Selmer.

== Demographics ==
Historical population
Census	Pop.	Note	%±
1990	497		—
2000	483		−2.8%
2010	466		−3.5%
2020	414		−11.2%

As of the census of 2000, there were 483 people, 188 households, and 141 families residing in the town. The population density was 41.2 inhabitants per square mile (15.9/km^{2}). There were 217 housing units at an average density of 18.5 per square mile (7.1/km^{2}). The racial makeup of the town was 68.94% White, 30.43% Black, 0.21% Asian, and 0.41% from two or more races.

There were 188 households, out of which 33.0% had children under the age of 18 living with them, 59.6% were married couples living together, 11.2% had a female householder with no husband present, and 25.0% were non-families. 21.8% of all households were made up of individuals, and 11.7% had someone living alone who was 65 years of age or older. The average household size was 2.57 and the average family size was 3.01.

In the town, the population was spread out, with 24.6% under the age of 18, 8.1% from 18 to 24, 25.5% from 25 to 44, 28.0% from 45 to 64, and 13.9% who were 65 years of age or older. The median age was 39 years. For every 100 females, there were 96.3 males. For every 100 females age 18 and over, there were 94.7 males.

The median income for a household in the town was $30,694, and the median income for a family was $32,167. Males had a median income of $26,875 versus $21,932 for females. The per capita income for the town was $14,383. 11.1% of the population and 11.0% of families were below the poverty line. Out of the total population, 10.1% of those under the age of 18 and 12.0% of those 65 and older were living below the poverty line.

== Politics ==
In 2004, Paul E. Durr became the town's second mayor. He was the first African American mayor in both Guys and McNairy County.
