= Middleton, Tennessee =

- City
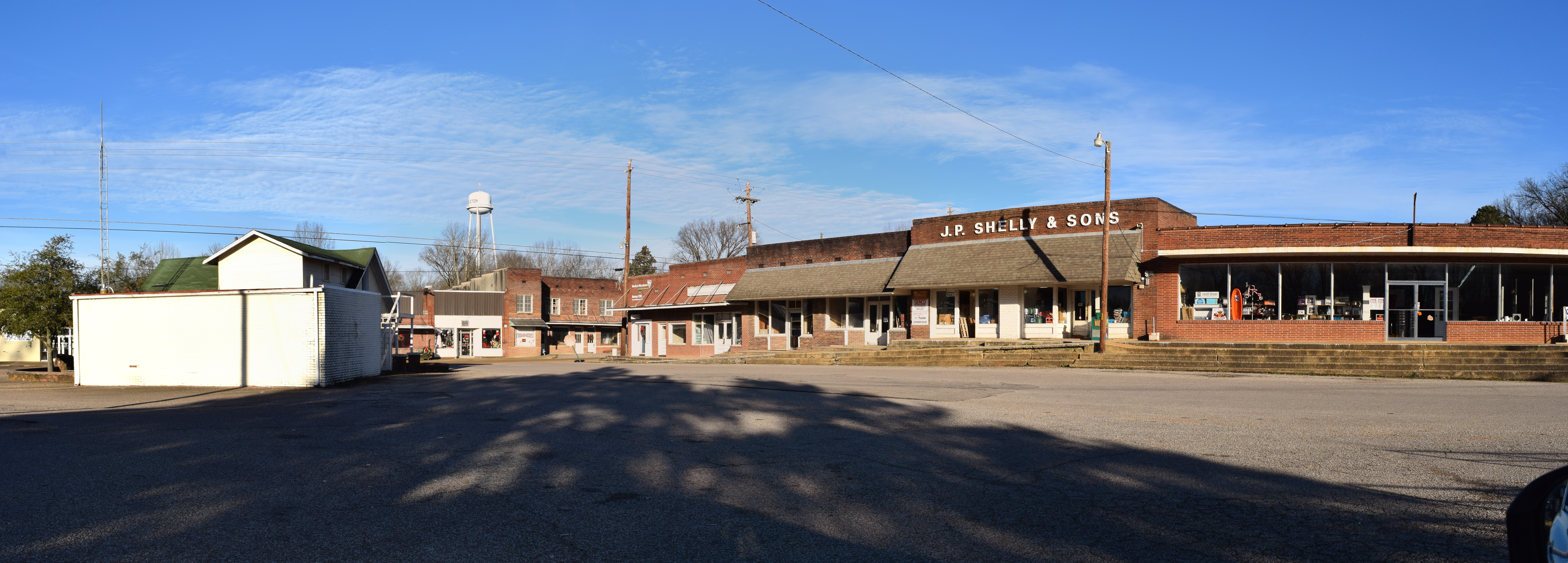
- Motto: "Crossroads of the South"
- Location of Middleton in Hardeman County, Tennessee
- Coordinates: 35°3′32″N 88°53′30″W
- Country: United States
- State: Tennessee
- County: Hardeman
- Chartered: 1850

Government
  - Mayor: Evan Mott
  - Vice Mayor: David Callahan Jr.

Area
  - Total: 2.10 sq mi (5.43 km^{2})
  - Land: 2.09 sq mi (5.41 km^{2})
  - Water: 0.0077 sq mi (0.02 km^{2})
- Elevation: 417 ft (127 m)

Population (2020)
  - Total: 658
  - Density: 314.8/sq mi (121.54/km^{2})
- Time zone: UTC-6 (Central (CST))
  - Summer (DST): UTC-5 (CDT)
- ZIP code: 38052
- Area code: 731
- FIPS code: 47-48340
- GNIS feature ID: 1293713
- Website: cityofmiddleton.org

Middleton is a city in Hardeman County, Tennessee, United States. As of the 2020 census, Middleton had a population of 658. It is located at the intersection of Tennessee State Route 125 and Tennessee State Route 57. Its slogan is the "Crossroads of the South".

== History ==
It is believed that early settlers in Middleton came from Slab Town, a small settlement about 3 miles (5 km) north. The town was originally called "Jenkins-McCommons Crossing", after Jesse Jenksins and William Taylor McCommons. These two men came to the area from North Carolina in 1849 and donated the majority of land where Middleton is today. Following the expansion of the Memphis and Charleston Railroad and the construction of a railroad depot, Middleton was chartered in 1850. It was named after an official at the Memphis and Charleston Railroad. The town suffered greatly during the Civil War. After the war, only one building, a small log structure that served as a store, was left standing.

== Geography ==
Middleton is located in southeastern Hardeman County at 35°3′32″N 88°53′30″W (35.058798, -88.891728). Tennessee State Route 125 is the city's Main Street, leading north 15 miles (24 km) to Bolivar, the county seat, and south 4 miles (6 km) to the Mississippi border. Walnut, Mississippi, is 8 miles (13 km) south of Middleton. Tennessee State Route 57 (Tennessee Avenue) crosses Route 125 in the southern part of Middleton, leading east 16 miles (26 km) to Ramer and west 17 miles (27 km) to Grand Junction.

According to the United States Census Bureau, Middleton has a total area of 1.9 square miles (5.0 km^{2}), of which 0.01 square miles (0.02 km^{2}), or 0.36%, are water. The city drains east to Cypress Creek, a north-flowing tributary of the Hatchie River.

== Demographics ==
Historical population
Census	Pop.	Note	%±
1860	143		—
1870	150		4.9%
1880	189		26.0%
1890	191		1.1%
1900	287		50.3%
1910	273		−4.9%
1920	321		17.6%
1930	372		15.9%
1940	430		15.6%
1950	362		−15.8%
1960	461		27.3%
1970	654		41.9%
1980	596		−8.9%
1990	536		−10.1%
2000	602		12.3%
2010	706		17.3%
2020	658		−6.8%

=== 2020 census ===
As of the 2020 census, Middleton had a population of 658. The median age was 38.4 years, 25.4% of residents were under the age of 18, and 20.8% of residents were 65 years of age or older. For every 100 females there were 86.4 males, and for every 100 females age 18 and over there were 86.0 males age 18 and over.

0.0% of residents lived in urban areas, while 100.0% lived in rural areas.

There were 276 households in Middleton, of which 39.5% had children under the age of 18 living in them. Of all households, 38.8% were married-couple households, 18.1% were households with a male householder and no spouse or partner present, and 37.7% were households with a female householder and no spouse or partner present. About 26.5% of all households were made up of individuals and 10.9% had someone living alone who was 65 years of age or older.

There were 305 housing units, of which 9.5% were vacant. The homeowner vacancy rate was 0.0% and the rental vacancy rate was 6.9%.

Racial composition as of the 2020 census
Race	Number	Percent
White	487	74.0%
Black or African American	125	19.0%
American Indian and Alaska Native	1	0.2%
Asian	4	0.6%
Native Hawaiian and Other Pacific Islander	0	0.0%
Some other race	15	2.3%
Two or more races	26	4.0%
Hispanic or Latino (of any race)	17	2.6%

=== 2000 census ===
As of the 2000 census, there was a population of 602, with 259 households and 171 families residing in the city. The population density was 326.3 inhabitants per square mile (126.0/km^{2}). There were 289 housing units at an average density of 156.7 per square mile (60.5/km^{2}). The racial makeup of the city was 87.87% White, 11.30% African American, 0.66% Asian, and 0.17% from two or more races. Hispanic or Latino of any race were 0.66% of the population.

There were 259 households, out of which 31.3% had children under the age of 18 living with them, 50.2% were married couples living together, 13.9% had a female householder with no husband present, and 33.6% were non-families. 31.3% of all households were made up of individuals, and 14.7% had someone living alone who was 65 years of age or older. The average household size was 2.27 and the average family size was 2.84.

In the city, the population was spread out, with 23.4% under the age of 18, 8.6% from 18 to 24, 23.6% from 25 to 44, 24.4% from 45 to 64, and 19.9% who were 65 years of age or older. The median age was 41 years. For every 100 females, there were 77.1 males. For every 100 females age 18 and over, there were 79.4 males.

The median income for a household in the city was $30,385, and the median income for a family was $39,063. Males had a median income of $31,094 versus $21,250 for females. The per capita income for the city was $15,616. About 8.3% of families and 14.3% of the population were below the poverty line, including 22.4% of those under age 18 and 22.4% of those age 65 or over.

== Economy ==
Middleton is home to a 40-acre (16 ha) rail-served commercial park. The town also has a major natural gas distribution facility and other industrial manufacturers that employee over 1,000. ThyssenKrupp (formerly Dover Corporation) has an elevator manufacturing plant in Middleton. Other industries include Middleton Fiberglass, F.L. Crane Inc. Spray Coating Division, a hardwood sales company, EP Minerals, LLC, makes of cat litter, and El Paso Tennessee Gas.

== Arts and culture ==
=== Annual cultural events ===
Middleton hosts a series of annual events including the Fur, Fin and Feather Festival over Labor Day, the "M-Town Variety Show" in March, and an annual Christmas parade and related holiday events each December.

=== Points of interest ===
The oldest structure in Middleton is the Rose House which was built by Benjamin Rose in 1833. The second oldest building is the Methodist Church and Adams Masonic Lodge #264 which was built in 1859. The City Hall is also the location of the local veterans memorial. The community has a library, a community center, two city parks and a "Boy Scout Hut" which serves as a meeting space for the local Boy Scouts of America troop, which was founded in Middleton in 1938.

== Government ==
Middleton is governed by a mayor and five aldermen, one of whom serves as vice mayor. They are elected every four years. The town's property taxes are .99 per $100 of assessed value.

== Infrastructure ==
=== Transportation ===
Major thoroughfares

- Tennessee State Route 57 (Tennessee Avenue)
- Tennessee State Route 125 (Main Street)

Railroad systems

- Norfolk Southern Railway

=== Utilities ===
Middleton provides residents water and sewer utilities. The community also has a recycling drop off.

=== Safety ===
The town has a full-time police chief and department. The community is also served by the Middleton Volunteer Fire Department. The current firehouse was built at no charge by inmates from the Hardeman County Correctional Facility. The fire department has a Class 5 fire insurance rating.

=== Health ===
Middleton has two medical clinics, a dental clinic and a nursing home.

== Notable natives ==
Middleton has been the birthplace, home, or vacation town for a number of notable people. Bailey Howell, Basketball Hall of Famer was born and raised in Middleton until attending Mississippi State University. Howell was a Boston Celtics player, along with Steve Hamer, who was born in Memphis went to high school in Middleton before he attended the University of Tennessee. Another athlete, Wayne Haddix, was born in nearby Bolivar but attended Middleton High School, he would go on to play for the Tampa Bay Buccaneers.

Jim Stewart and Estelle Axton, the co-founders of Stax Records, were born in Middleton, before moving to Memphis.
