= Saulsbury, Tennessee =

- Town
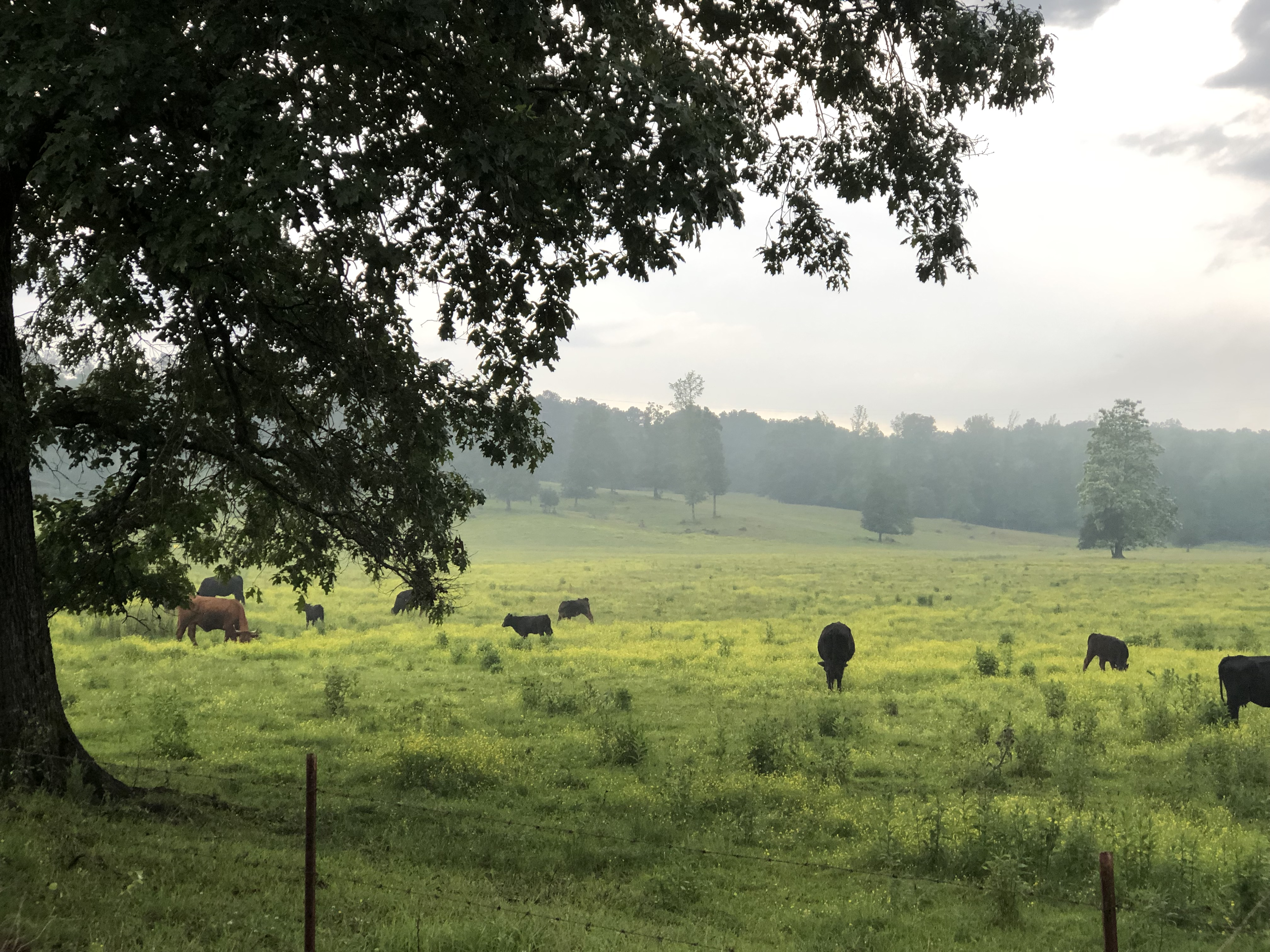
- Cows graze in rural Saulsbury, 2019

- Location of Saulsbury in Hardeman County, Tennessee.
- Coordinates: 35°2′57″N 89°5′20″W
- Country: United States
- State: Tennessee
- County: Hardeman

Area
  - Total: 0.61 sq mi (1.57 km^{2})
  - Land: 0.61 sq mi (1.57 km^{2})
  - Water: 0 sq mi (0.00 km^{2})
- Elevation: 535 ft (163 m)

Population (2020)
  - Total: 112
  - Density: 185.0/sq mi (71.44/km^{2})
- Time zone: UTC−6 (Central (CST))
  - Summer (DST): UTC−5 (CDT)
- ZIP Code: 38067
- Area code: 731
- FIPS code: 47-66680
- GNIS feature ID: 1300805

Saulsbury is a town in rural Hardeman County, Tennessee. It is located along State Highway 57 in southwest Hardeman County. As of the 2020 census, Saulsbury had a population of 112. Saulsbury is the fourth least-populated incorporated municipality in Tennessee.

== History ==
Saulsbury's historical roots stem from a former settlement named Berlin, Tennessee, which was located one mile south of the current location of Saulsbury. Two regional mail roads—one from Bolivar to Ripley, Mississippi, and another from LaGrange to Corinth, Mississippi. These mail roads met at an intersection which would form into a trading center. In 1839 a post office was established there, and Berlin would be incorporated in 1846, and within five years it would be home to 351 people. Upon the completion of the Memphis and Charleston Railroad, Berlin was bypassed due to one landowner's refusal to sell their property to the railroad. A track was instead laid one mile north of Berlin, on land that was owned by Burrell Sauls and Berry Futrell. The finished railroad station and track would be called Sauls-Berry Depot. Eventually Berlin would be deserted as people moved to the new settlement and in 1856 Saulsbury was incorporated.

=== Civil War ===
Just after the taking of Memphis in 1862, the Union Army took Saulsbury. Skirmishes continued throughout the area, and eventually Saulsbury would return to Confederate control. Confederate soldiers used Saulsbury as a rally point to travel to Corinth to join their regiments. After the Civil War, Saulsbury maintained itself as a town, unlike others in the area which barely survived the war. Saulsbury's cotton production survived the war as well, and Saulsbury emerged as a leader in cotton production in the region. The town also became a producer of eggs, turkeys, poultry and hogs; which were often sent to Memphis for sale. Sand mining became a major industry in the 1870s, providing 47 different types of sand for brass molding.

=== 1999 Tornado ===
On January 17, 1999, an F1 tornado formed just southwest of Saulsbury, and moved northeast until dissipating near Rogers Springs. One person was killed, four others were injured. Fourteen houses and mobile homes were destroyed, and twenty-seven others were damaged. Power lines and trees also sustained significant damage. As a result, the town of Saulsbury installed a tornado siren at the local fire station, the only one in the area at the time.

== Geography ==
Saulsbury is located at 35°2′57″N 89°5′20″W (35.049276, -89.088858). According to the United States Census Bureau, the town has a total area of 0.4 square miles (1.0 km^{2}), all land.

== Demographics ==
Historical population
Census	Pop.	Note	%±
1860	337		—
1870	400		18.7%
1880	188		−53.0%
1910	199		—
1920	190		−4.5%
1930	207		8.9%
1940	202		−2.4%
1950	143		−29.2%
1960	141		−1.4%
1970	156		10.6%
1980	156		0.0%
1990	106		−32.1%
2000	99		−6.6%
2010	81		−18.2%
2020	112		38.3%

As of the census of 2000, there were 99 people, 43 households, and 26 families residing in the town. The population density was 271.7 inhabitants per square mile (104.9/km^{2}). There were 53 housing units at an average density of 145.4 per square mile (56.1/km^{2}). The racial makeup of the town was 85.86% White, 12.12% African American, and 2.02% from two or more races.

There were 43 households, out of which 25.6% had children under the age of 18 living with them, 48.8% were married couples living together, 9.3% had a female householder with no husband present, and 39.5% were non-families. 30.2% of all households were made up of individuals, and 20.9% had someone living alone who was 65 years of age or older. The average household size was 2.30 and the average family size was 2.92.

In the town, the population was spread out, with 24.2% under the age of 18, 10.1% from 18 to 24, 15.2% from 25 to 44, 29.3% from 45 to 64, and 21.2% who were 65 years of age or older. The median age was 46 years. For every 100 females, there were 110.6 males. For every 100 females age 18 and over, there were 97.4 males.

The median income for a household in the town was $30,000, and the median income for a family was $41,250. Males had a median income of $26,250 versus $28,125 for females. The per capita income for the town was $10,335. There were 22.2% of families and 29.7% of the population living below the poverty line, including 48.8% of under eighteens and none of those over 64. Most of those living below the poverty line receive federal aid.

== Climate ==
Saulsbury's climate is generally similar to the rest of the Mid-South. The summer months are persistently hot and humid with afternoon temperatures frequently above 90 degrees Fahrenheit. Afternoon thunderstorms are frequent during some summers, but usually brief, lasting no longer than an hour. Early autumn is pleasantly drier and mild, but can remain hot until late October. Abrupt but short-lived cold snaps are common. Late autumn is rainy and colder, December being the third rainiest month of the year. Winters are mild, but cold snaps can occur. Snowfall is not abundant but does occur during most winters, with usually one or two major winter weather events occurring by the end of March. Spring often begins in late February or early March, following the onset of a sharp warmup. This season is also known as "severe weather season" due to the higher frequency of tornadoes, hail, and thunderstorms producing strong winds. Average rainfall is slightly higher during the spring months (except November) than the rest of the year. Historically, April is the month with the highest frequency of tornadoes, though tornadoes have occurred every month of the year. Saulsbury-area historical tornado activity is above Tennessee state average. It is 155% greater than the overall U.S. average. The area is sunny about 62.5% of the time.

== Arts and culture ==
In the 1970s the Saulsbury Methodist Church, which was built in 1913, was deeded to town for the community library. Upon the completion of fundraising, the town was able to renovate the building; they installed heating and air conditioning, and made it accessible. A number of antebellum homes and buildings are preserved in Saulsbury. The town has three active community clubs: the Saulsbury Community Club, the Nifty Needles Women's Club, and the Friendship Club.

=== Annual cultural events ===
Saulsbury hosts three major events each year: a Christmas tree-lighting, the Community Celebration, and a home decorating contest, all in December. The community also hosts year round bake-off, a fish fry in June, and an annual stew sale in October; all which benefit community projects.

=== In popular culture ===
The final destination for the principal characters, Lena Grove and Byron Bunch, in William Faulkner's novel, Light in August, is Saulsbury.

== Government ==
Saulsbury is governed by a mayor and a board of six aldermen who are elected every four years.

== Infrastructure ==
=== Major Thoroughfares ===
- State Route 57
