= Eastview, Tennessee =

- Town
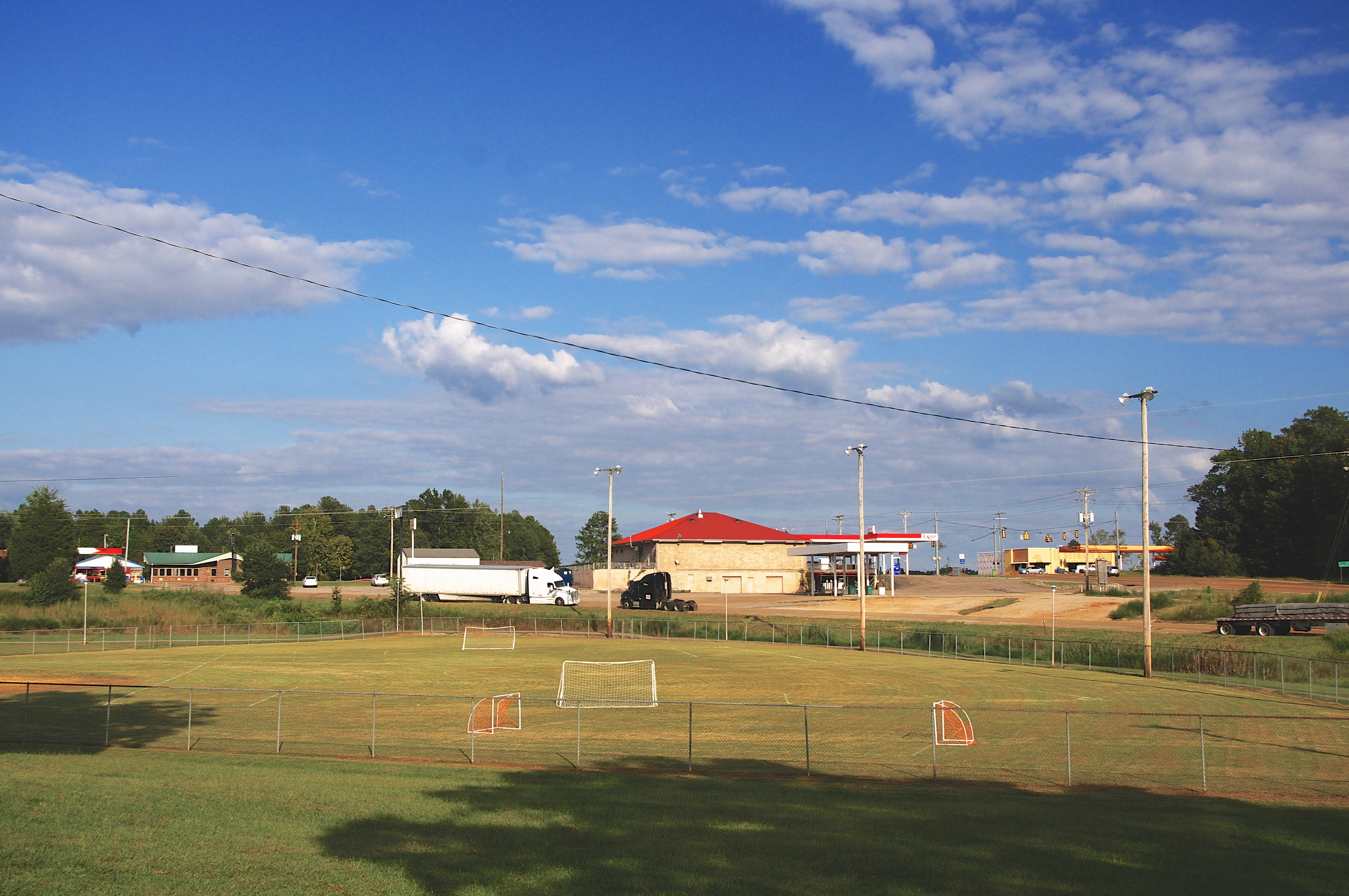
- Eastview

- Location of Eastview in McNairy County, Tennessee.
- Coordinates: 35°4′52″N 88°33′3″W
- Country: United States
- State: Tennessee
- County: McNairy

Area
  - Total: 5.12 sq mi (13.26 km^{2})
  - Land: 5.12 sq mi (13.26 km^{2})
  - Water: 0 sq mi (0.00 km^{2})
- Elevation: 522 ft (159 m)

Population (2020)
  - Total: 763
  - Density: 149.1/sq mi (57.56/km^{2})
- Time zone: UTC-6 (Central (CST))
  - Summer (DST): UTC-5 (CDT)
- FIPS code: 47-22920
- GNIS feature ID: 1283436

Eastview is a town in McNairy County, Tennessee. As of the 2020 census, Eastview had a population of 763. The town is located on the Southside outskirts of Selmer, Tennessee.

== History ==
Eastview is rooted in a three-room house and filling station established by the Littlejohn family in 1927. These buildings both faced east, giving the town its name. Eastview incorporated in the late 1960s.

== Geography ==
Eastview is located at 35°4′52″N 88°33′3″W (35.081209, -88.550886). The town is concentrated around the intersection of U.S. Route 45 and Tennessee State Route 57, a few miles north of the Tennessee-Mississippi state line. The town's municipal boundaries stretch along US 45 to Selmer to the north and Guys to the south. Michie and Ramer lie along SR 57 to the east and west, respectively.

According to the United States Census Bureau, the town has a total area of 5.0 square miles (13 km^{2}), all land.

== Demographics ==
Historical population
Census	Pop.	Note	%±
1970	423		—
1980	552		30.5%
1990	563		2.0%
2000	618		9.8%
2010	705		14.1%
2020	763		8.2%

As of the census of 2000, there were 618 people, 277 households, and 186 families residing in the town. The population density was 123.2 inhabitants per square mile (47.6/km^{2}). There were 302 housing units at an average density of 60.2 per square mile (23.2/km^{2}). The racial makeup of the town was 94.34% White, 3.56% African American, 0.81% Native American, 0.16% from other races, and 1.13% from two or more races. Hispanic or Latino of any race were 0.16% of the population.

There were 277 households, out of which 25.3% had children under the age of 18 living with them, 54.2% were married couples living together, 9.0% had a female householder with no husband present, and 32.5% were non-families. 27.8% of all households were made up of individuals, and 11.6% had someone living alone who was 65 years of age or older. The average household size was 2.23 and the average family size was 2.68.

In the town, the population was spread out, with 19.1% under the age of 18, 6.6% from 18 to 24, 31.1% from 25 to 44, 28.2% from 45 to 64, and 15.0% who were 65 years of age or older. The median age was 41 years. For every 100 females, there were 87.3 males. For every 100 females age 18 and over, there were 91.6 males.

The median income for a household in the town was $29,766, and the median income for a family was $35,938. Males had a median income of $28,173 versus $21,625 for females. The per capita income for the town was $17,094. About 8.3% of families and 9.7% of the population were below the poverty line, including 6.9% of those under age 18 and 10.6% of those age 65 or over.

== Newspaper ==
Eastview's newspaper is the Independent Appeal, which serves all of McNairy County. It was founded in 1902.
