= Hardeman County, Tennessee =

County in Tennessee, United States

- County
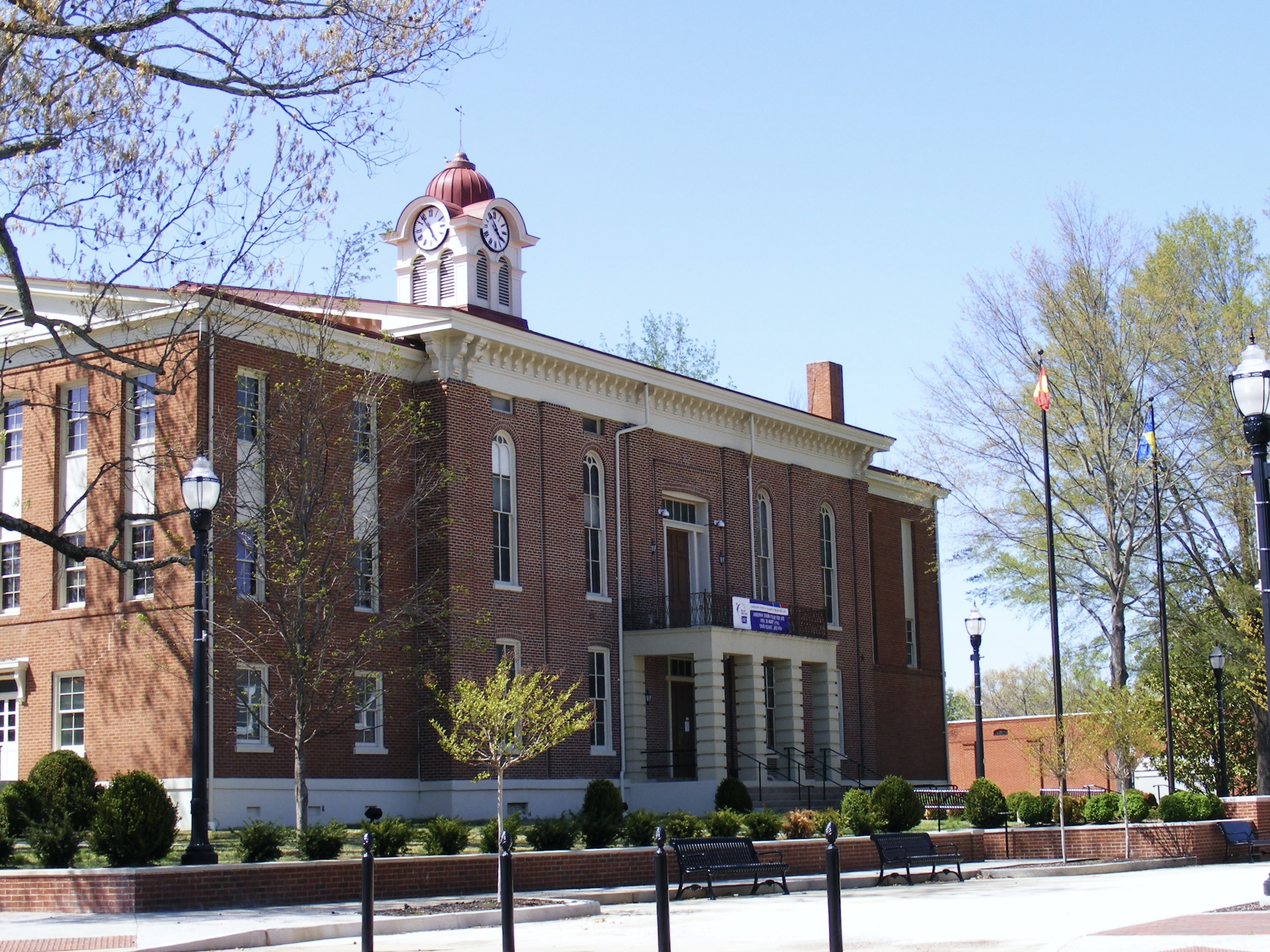
- Hardeman County Courthouse in Bolivar

- Location within the U.S. state of Tennessee
- Coordinates: 35°12′N 89°00′W
- Country: United States
- State: Tennessee
- Founded: 1823
- Named for: Thomas J. Hardeman
- Seat: Bolivar
- Largest city: Bolivar

Area
  - Total: 670 sq mi (1,700 km^{2})
  - Land: 668 sq mi (1,730 km^{2})
  - Water: 2.6 sq mi (6.7 km^{2}) 0.4%

Population (2020)
  - Total: 25,462
  - Estimate (2025): 25,274 ▼
  - Density: 38.1/sq mi (14.7/km^{2})
- Time zone: UTC−6 (Central)
  - Summer (DST): UTC−5 (CDT)
- Congressional district: 8th
- Website: https://hardemancounty.org/

Hardeman County is a county located in the U.S. state of Tennessee. As of the 2020 census, the population was 25,462. Its county seat is Bolivar.

== History ==
Hardeman County was created by the Tennessee General Assembly in 1823 from parts of Hardin County and "Indian lands." It is named for Thomas J. Hardeman (1788–1854), a veteran of the Creek War and the War of 1812 and a prominent figure in the fight for Texas independence. He served as a congressman in the Republic of Texas, and was also the father of Confederate brigadier general William Polk Hardeman.

Settlers began arriving in the area that is now Hardeman County in 1819, following a treaty with the Chickasaw allowing settlement in West Tennessee signed on October 19, 1818. Among these earliest settlers were the county's namesame Thomas Hardeman and Ezekiel Polk, the paternal grandfather of president James K. Polk. Thereafter, further settlers arrived from Middle Tennessee, Alabama, North and South Carolina, and Virginia.

The first permanent settlement was established in 1823 along the Hatchie River, dubbed Hatchie Town. The town's location along the river led to recurrent flooding, and ultimately the decision was made to relocate the settlement approximately one mile south to what is now Bolivar.

Hardeman County was the site of several battles and skirmishes in the Civil War. The largest of these was the Battle of Hatchie Bridge which took place on October 5, 1862, and resulted in 900 total casualties. Much of downtown Bolivar was also burned down during the war. The town of Grand Junction was the site of the first contraband camp, organized by John Eaton to shelter and employ enslaved individuals captured by the Union.

The county is the location of two of Tennessee's four private prisons, the Whiteville Correctional Facility and the Hardeman County Correctional Center. Both are medium-security facilities for men, operated by the Corrections Corporation of America.

== Geography ==
According to the U.S. Census Bureau, the county has a total area of 670 square miles (1,700 km^{2}), of which 668 square miles (1,730 km^{2}) is land and 2.6 square miles (6.7 km^{2}) (0.4%) is water. It is the fifth-largest county in Tennessee by area.

=== Adjacent counties ===
- Madison County (north)
- Chester County (northeast)
- McNairy County (east)
- Alcorn County, Mississippi (southeast)
- Tippah County, Mississippi (south)
- Benton County, Mississippi (southwest)
- Fayette County (west)
- Haywood County (northwest)

=== National protected areas ===
- Hatchie National Wildlife Refuge

=== State protected areas ===
- Chickasaw State Park (part)

== Demographics ==
Historical population
Census	Pop.	Note	%±
1830	11,655		—
1840	14,563		25.0%
1850	17,456		19.9%
1860	17,769		1.8%
1870	18,074		1.7%
1880	22,921		26.8%
1890	21,029		−8.3%
1900	22,976		9.3%
1910	23,011		0.2%
1920	22,278		−3.2%
1930	22,193		−0.4%
1940	23,590		6.3%
1950	23,311		−1.2%
1960	21,517		−7.7%
1970	22,435		4.3%
1980	23,873		6.4%
1990	23,377		−2.1%
2000	28,105		20.2%
2010	27,253		−3.0%
2020	25,462		−6.6%
2025 (est.)	25,274	▼	−0.7%
U.S. Decennial Census; 1790-1960 1900-1990; 1990-2000 2010-2014

=== Racial and ethnic composition ===
Hardeman County, Tennessee – Racial and ethnic composition Note: the US Census treats Hispanic/Latino as an ethnic category. This table excludes Latinos from the racial categories and assigns them to a separate category. Hispanics/Latinos may be of any race.
Race / ethnicity (NH = Non-Hispanic)	Pop 2000	Pop 2010	Pop 2020	% 2000	% 2010	% 2020
White alone (NH)	15,994	15,197	13,970	56.91%	55.76%	54.87%
Black or African American alone (NH)	11,474	11,228	10,150	40.83%	41.20%	39.86%
Native American or Alaska Native alone (NH)	66	56	46	0.23%	0.21%	0.18%
Asian alone (NH)	78	145	162	0.28%	0.53%	0.64%
Pacific Islander alone (NH)	5	0	6	0.02%	0.00%	0.02%
Other race alone (NH)	13	18	68	0.05%	0.07%	0.27%
Mixed race or Multiracial (NH)	202	233	566	0.72%	0.85%	2.22%
Hispanic or Latino (any race)	273	376	494	0.97%	1.38%	1.94%
Total	28,105	27,253	25,462	100.00%	100.00%	100.00%

=== 2020 census ===
As of the 2020 census, the county had a population of 25,462, 8,891 households, and 5,816 families. The median age was 42.0 years; 18.3% of residents were under the age of 18 and 18.3% were 65 years of age or older. For every 100 females there were 121.1 males, and for every 100 females age 18 and over there were 126.9 males.

The racial makeup of the county was 55.3% White, 40.0% Black or African American, 0.2% American Indian and Alaska Native, 0.6% Asian, <0.1% Native Hawaiian and Pacific Islander, 1.1% from some other race, and 2.7% from two or more races. Hispanic or Latino residents of any race comprised 1.9% of the population.

20.7% of residents lived in urban areas, while 79.3% lived in rural areas.

There were 9,174 households in the county, of which 27.5% had children under the age of 18 living in them. Of all households, 40.6% were married-couple households, 19.6% were households with a male householder and no spouse or partner present, and 34.3% were households with a female householder and no spouse or partner present. About 31.2% of all households were made up of individuals and 14.0% had someone living alone who was 65 years of age or older.

There were 10,655 housing units, of which 13.9% were vacant. Among occupied housing units, 69.8% were owner-occupied and 30.2% were renter-occupied. The homeowner vacancy rate was 1.8% and the rental vacancy rate was 8.5%.

=== 2010 census ===
As of the 2010 census the racial makeup of the county was 56.1% White (non-Hispanic) or European American, 41.01% Black or African American, 0.24% Native American, 0.29% Asian, 0.01% Pacific Islander, 0.2% from other races, and 0.79% from two or more races. 0.96% of the population were Hispanic or Latino of any race.

=== 2000 census ===
As of the 2000 census there were 28,105 people, 9,412 households, and 6,767 families residing in the county. The population density was 42 people per square mile (16 people/km^{2}). There were 10,694 housing units at an average density of 16 units per square mile (6.2/km^{2}). The racial makeup of the county was 57.34% White (non-Hispanic) or European American, 40.97% Black or African American, 0.26% Native American, 0.31% Asian, 0.02% Pacific Islander, 0.30% from other races, and 0.79% from two or more races. 0.97% of the population were Hispanic or Latino of any race.

There were 9,412 households, out of which 32.60% had children under the age of 18 living with them, 50.00% were married couples living together, 17.60% had a female householder with no husband present, and 28.10% were non-families. 25.10% of all households were made up of individuals, and 11.40% had someone living alone who was 65 years of age or older. The average household size was 2.56 and the average family size was 3.06.

In the county, the population was spread out, with 23.90% under the age of 18, 9.80% from 18 to 24, 31.30% from 25 to 44, 22.40% from 45 to 64, and 12.60% who were 65 years of age or older. The median age was 36 years. For every 100 females there were 116.90 males. For every 100 females age 18 and over, there were 121.40 males.

The median income for a household in the county was $29,111, and the median income for a family was $34,746. Males had a median income of $27,828 versus $20,759 for females. The per capita income for the county was $13,349. About 16.90% of families and 19.70% of the population were below the poverty line, including 24.40% of those under age 18 and 20.80% of those age 65 or over.

== Schools ==
- Bolivar Central High School
- Bolivar Middle School
- Bolivar Elementary School
- Whiteville Elementary School
- Middleton High School
- Middleton Elementary School
- Toone Elementary School
- Grand Junction Elementary School
- Hornsby Elementary School

== Communities ==
=== Cities ===
- Bolivar (county seat and largest city)
- Grand Junction (partial)
- Middleton
- Medon (mostly in Madison County)

=== Towns ===
- Hickory Valley
- Hornsby (partially in Mcnairy County)
- Saulsbury
- Silerton (partial)
- Toone
- Whiteville

=== Census-designated places ===
- Essary Springs
- Pocahontas

=== Unincorporated and historic communities ===
- Cloverport
- Middleburg
- New Castle
- Piney Grove
- Porters Creek
- Rogers Springs
- Serles
- Van Buren
- Vildo

== Politics ==
Apart from its powerful vote against Hubert Humphrey in 1968 and George McGovern in 1972 as well as George H. W. Bush's 21-vote plurality in 1988, Hardeman County was a solidly Democratic county up until it flipped to Donald Trump in 2016.

United States presidential election results for Hardeman County, Tennessee
Year	Republican		Democratic		Third party(ies)	
Year	No.	%	No.	%	No.	%
1912	320	16.71%	1,323	69.09%	272	14.20%
1916	485	21.89%	1,724	77.80%	7	0.32%
1920	895	28.59%	2,212	70.67%	23	0.73%
1924	254	13.39%	1,586	83.61%	57	3.00%
1928	491	25.04%	1,453	74.09%	17	0.87%
1932	281	10.49%	2,377	88.69%	22	0.82%
1936	157	7.74%	1,869	92.11%	3	0.15%
1940	319	11.10%	2,549	88.66%	7	0.24%
1944	444	18.50%	1,949	81.21%	7	0.29%
1948	317	9.61%	1,609	48.76%	1,374	41.64%
1952	1,256	31.17%	2,747	68.18%	26	0.65%
1956	818	24.40%	1,754	52.31%	781	23.29%
1960	1,601	44.42%	1,711	47.48%	292	8.10%
1964	2,450	47.80%	2,675	52.20%	0	0.00%
1968	1,171	20.18%	1,709	29.45%	2,924	50.38%
1972	3,494	66.00%	1,550	29.28%	250	4.72%
1976	2,254	35.95%	3,934	62.74%	82	1.31%
1980	2,931	40.68%	4,153	57.64%	121	1.68%
1984	3,712	48.68%	3,797	49.79%	117	1.53%
1988	3,547	49.69%	3,526	49.40%	65	0.91%
1992	3,122	36.19%	4,832	56.01%	673	7.80%
1996	2,961	35.97%	4,859	59.03%	411	4.99%
2000	3,729	42.36%	4,953	56.26%	121	1.37%
2004	4,704	44.95%	5,685	54.32%	77	0.74%
2008	5,225	46.50%	5,919	52.67%	93	0.83%
2012	4,865	46.60%	5,482	52.51%	92	0.88%
2016	4,919	53.05%	4,185	45.13%	169	1.82%
2020	5,760	57.24%	4,180	41.54%	123	1.22%
2024	5,793	61.63%	3,527	37.53%	79	0.84%

== See also ==
- National Register of Historic Places listings in Hardeman County, Tennessee
- John Chisum
- Bailey Hardeman, brother of Thomas J. Hardeman
- Hardeman County, Texas
- Bolivar Female Academy
