= Chickasaw State Park (Tennessee) =

State park in Tennessee, United States

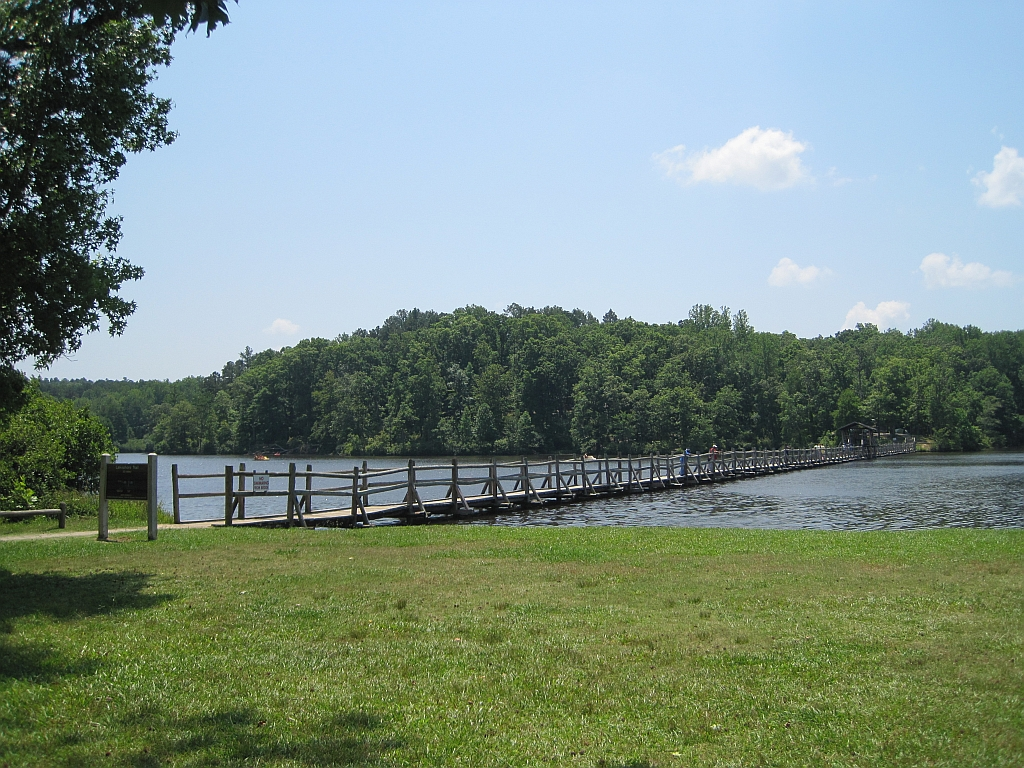
- Chickasaw State Park
- Interactive map of Chickasaw State Park
- Type: Tennessee State Park
- Location: Henderson, Chester County, Tennessee
- Coordinates: 35°23′35″N 88°46′21″W
- Operator: TDEC
- Website: Chickasaw State Park

Chickasaw State Park is a state park located in Chester County, Tennessee, in the Southeastern United States. The park consists of 1,280 acres (5 km^{2}) amidst a 14,384 acres (58 km^{2}) state forest and includes Lake Placid, Lake Lajoie, and some of West Tennessee's highest areas.

== History ==
Chickasaw State Park was named for the Chickasaw Indians who once inhabited West Tennessee and Northern Mississippi. Located in west Tennessee along the border of Hardeman and Chester Counties was 1,400 acres of land that was considered to be one of Tennessee's 20 new Deal-era state parks.

In 1955, the territory became a state park because park duties returned to state control, and park and forest lands were deeded to the state. The area consists of 14,384 acres of timberland, however, 1,280 of those acres are used for recreation

== Recreation ==
Chickasaw State Park offers many activities to its visitors including camping, golfing, paddling, bird-watching, interpretive programming, swimming, hiking, biking, fishing, and horseback riding.

Chickasaw has three campgrounds: the RV campground, the tent campground, and the wrangler campground. The RV campground has 53 sites, each with water and electrical hookups and some with sewer connection. The tent campground has 29 sites with available water. The wrangler campground has 32 sites and is designed for visitors traveling with horses; each site comes with water and electrical hookups. There are 13 historic Works Progress Administration (WPA) cabins available for rent near Lake Placid as well as the Group Lodge building, which can accommodate up to 36 people.

There are eight hiking trails at Chickasaw State Park: Fern Creek Trail (0.8 miles, easy), Forked Pine Trail (0.7 miles, moderate), Friends Trail (1.5 miles, moderate), Lake Lajoie Trail (1.3 miles, easy), Lakeshore Trail (1.5 miles, easy), Owen's Spring Trail (0.8 miles, moderate), Public Horse Trail (0.4 miles, moderate), and Tent Loop (0.3 miles, easy).

At Lake Placid's boat dock, paddleboards, canoes, kayaks, and pedal boats can be rented from Memorial Day through the first weekend in August and then, weekends only through October 16.

== See also ==
- List of Tennessee state parks
