= Mississippi Highway 367 =

Highway in Mississippi

Mississippi Highway 367
- MS 367 highlighted in pink

Route information
- Maintained by MDOT
- Length: 3.977 mi (6.400 km)
- Existed: c. 1965–present

Major junctions
- South end: MS 356 near Jacinto
- North end: Alcorn–Tishomingo county line near Leedy

Location
- Country: United States
- State: Mississippi
- Counties: Alcorn

Highway system
- Mississippi State Highway System; Interstate; US; State
← MS 366	→ MS 368

Mississippi Highway 367 (MS 367) is a short state highway located in northeastern Mississippi. The route starts at MS 356 near Jacinto and travels northeastward. MS 367 intersects several county roads before ending at the Alcorn–Tishomingo county line. The route was designated around 1965, from a former routing of MS 356. The highway was paved by 1974, and the section in Tishomingo County was decommissioned by 1998.

== Route description ==
All of MS 367 is located in southeastern Alcorn County. In 2017, the Mississippi Department of Transportation (MDOT) calculated 200 vehicles traveling on MS 367 southwest of County Road 349 (CO 349) on average each day. The route is legally defined in Mississippi Code § 65-3-3, and all of it is maintained by MDOT, as part of the Mississippi State Highway System.

MS 367 starts at a three-way junction with MS 356 east of Jacinto and travels northward. The route turns northeastward at CO 343, and enters a forested area. The road turns eastward briefly past CO 349, before returning northeastward at CO 358. South of the Redmont Railway, the route turns southeastward, and ends at the Alcorn–Tishomingo county line near Leedy. The road continues as CO 209, which travels to MS 365.

== History ==
Around 1956, MS 356 was designated from U.S. Route 45 (US 45) to US 72, connecting the towns of Rienzi and Burnsville. A spur route was also constructed from MS 356 in Alcorn County to MS 365 in Prentiss County. By 1958, MS 365 was extended northward, past the spur route, to MS 356 near Burnsville. By 1965, MS 356 was truncated to MS 365, rerouted to the spur route. MS 365 replaced MS 356 from south of Burnsville to west of Pickwick Lake. The former routing of MS 356 in Alcorn and Tishomingo counties was designated as MS 367. The section of MS 367 in Alcorn County had pavement changed from gravel to asphalt by 1971, and in Tishoming County by 1974. By 1998, only the section in Alcorn County was state maintained.

== Major intersections ==
County	Location	mi	km	Destinations	Notes
Alcorn		0.000	0.000	MS 356 – Jacinto, Rienzi	Southern terminus
Alcorn–Tishomingo county line		3.977	6.400	CO 209	Northern terminus; end of state maintenance
1.000 mi = 1.609 km; 1.000 km = 0.621 mi
