= Tennessee State Route 234 =

Highway in Tennessee

State Route 234
- Chewalla Road; Wenasoga Road
- SR 234 highlighted in red

Route information
- Maintained by TDOT
- Length: 6.7 mi (10.8 km)
- Existed: July 1, 1983–present

Major junctions
- South end: CR 700 at the Mississippi state line near Chewalla
- North end: SR 57 in Ramer

Location
- Country: United States
- State: Tennessee
- Counties: McNairy

Highway system
- Tennessee State Routes; Interstate; US; State
← SR 233	→ SR 235

State Route 234 (SR 234) is a 6.7-mile-long (10.8 km) north–south state highway in McNairy County, Tennessee, connecting the town of Ramer with the community of Chewalla and the state of Mississippi. SR 234 is known as Chewalla Road between Ramer and Chewalla and as Wenasoga Road between Chewalla and Mississippi.

== Route description ==
SR 234 begins at the Mississippi state line, where the roadway continues into the state as Alcorn County Road 700 (CR 700). It winds its way west then north as Wenasoga Road to pass through the community of Chewalla, where it becomes Chewalla Road at an intersection with Chewalla Street. The highway then passes northeast through farmland to enter Ramer, where it comes to an end at an intersection with SR 57. The entire route of SR 234 is a two-lane highway.

== Major intersections ==
The entire route is in McNairy County.

Location	mi	km	Destinations	Notes
	0.0	0.0	CR 700 south (Wenasoga Road) – Wenasoga	Southern terminus; Mississippi state line
Ramer	6.7	10.8	SR 57 – Eastview, Pocahontas, Middleton	Northern terminus
1.000 mi = 1.609 km; 1.000 km = 0.621 mi
