= National Register of Historic Places listings in Alcorn County, Mississippi =

Location of Alcorn County in Mississippi

This is a list of the National Register of Historic Places listings in Alcorn County, Mississippi.

This is intended to be a complete list of the properties and districts on the National Register of Historic Places in Alcorn County, Mississippi, United States. Latitude and longitude coordinates are provided for many National Register properties and districts; these locations may be seen together in a map.

There are 22 properties and districts listed on the National Register in the county, including 1 National Historic Landmark.

This National Park Service list is complete through NPS recent listings posted October 23, 2026.

== Current listings ==
	Name on the Register	Image	Date listed	Location	City or town	Description
1	Battery Williams	Battery Williams	April 11, 1977 (#77000783)	Fulton Dr. at the former Southern railroad line 34°56′03″N 88°31′37″W	Corinth	(See Siege and Battle of Corinth Sites )
2	Battle of Corinth, Confederate Assault Position	Battle of Corinth, Confederate Assault Position	April 30, 1976 (#76001088)	Shiloh Rd. 34°56′35″N 88°31′36″W	Corinth	(See Siege and Battle of Corinth Sites )
3	Dr. Joseph M. Bynum House	Dr. Joseph M. Bynum House	November 24, 1997 (#96001268)	48 S. Front St. 34°45′42″N 88°31′40″W	Rienzi	
4	Coliseum Theatre	Coliseum Theatre	August 21, 1980 (#80002199)	404 Taylor St. 34°56′03″N 88°31′07″W	Corinth	
5	Corinth Clothing Manufacturing Company Building	Corinth Clothing Manufacturing Company Building	November 17, 2004 (#04001241)	Tate St. at Davis St. 34°55′54″N 88°31′10″W	Corinth	
6	Corinth National Cemetery	Corinth National Cemetery	November 20, 1996 (#96001352)	1551 Horton St. 34°55′35″N 88°30′36″W	Corinth	(See Siege and Battle of Corinth Sites )
7	Thomas F. Dilworth House	Thomas F. Dilworth House	September 15, 1988 (#88001463)	10 CR-529; 34°49′41″N 88°35′40″W	Biggersville	
8	Downtown Corinth Historic District	Downtown Corinth Historic District	January 28, 1993 (#92001792)	Roughly bounded by Wick, Jackson, Foote and Webster Sts. 34°56′02″N 88°31′11″W	Corinth	
9	Easom High School		October 30, 2025 (#100012355)	700 Crater Street; 34°55′29″N 88°30′53″W	Corinth	
10	Federal Siege Trench	Federal Siege Trench	November 13, 1976 (#76001089)	North of Corinth off U.S. Route 45; 34°58′40″N 88°30′09″W	Corinth	(See Siege and Battle of Corinth Sites )
11	Fort Robinette	Fort Robinette	April 11, 1972 (#72000686)	Robinette St. 34°56′15″N 88°31′42″W	Corinth	(See Siege and Battle of Corinth Sites )
12	Gateway Lanes	Gateway Lanes	May 17, 2019 (#100003949)	2001 E. Shiloh Rd. 34°56′43″N 88°30′05″W	Corinth	
13	Jacinto Courthouse	Jacinto Courthouse	November 25, 1969 (#69000080)	Route 1; 34°45′41″N 88°25′41″W	Rienzi	
14	Midtown Corinth Historic District	Midtown Corinth Historic District	December 23, 1993 (#93001433)	Roughly bounded by Cass, Bunch, Washington, Main, Filmore, Linden, Douglas, and Cruise Sts. 34°56′15″N 88°30′57″W	Corinth	
15	Moores Creek Site	Moores Creek Site	July 7, 1975 (#75001039)	Address restricted	Rienzi	
16	Old US Post Office	Old US Post Office	January 29, 1992 (#91002038)	515 Fillmore St. 34°56′08″N 88°31′14″W	Corinth	
17	Rienzi Commercial Historic District	Rienzi Commercial Historic District	November 7, 1996 (#96001312)	Junction of Front and Main Sts. 34°45′49″N 88°31′41″W	Rienzi	Consists of several early 20th century buildings concentrated around the intersection of Main and Front streets
18	Siege and Battle of Corinth	Siege and Battle of Corinth	May 6, 1991 (#91001050)	Various locations in and around the town of Corinth; 34°56′15″N 88°31′09″W	Corinth	National Historic Landmark district including numerous sites
19	L.C. Steele House	L.C. Steele House	July 16, 1992 (#92000855)	515 4th St. 34°56′34″N 88°31′05″W	Corinth	
20	Union Battery F, Battle of Corinth	Union Battery F, Battle of Corinth	September 10, 1987 (#87001577)	1802 Bitner Rd. 34°56′53″N 88°33′06″W	Corinth	(See Siege and Battle of Corinth Sites )
21	Union Earthworks		July 25, 1997 (#97000770)	0.5 miles northeast of the junction of U.S. Route 45 and Mississippi Highway 356; 34°46′02″N 88°32′53″W	Rienzi	(See Siege and Battle of Corinth Sites )
22	Veranda House	Veranda House	August 22, 1975 (#75001038)	711 Jackson St. 34°56′13″N 88°31′15″W	Corinth	

== See also ==
- List of National Historic Landmarks in Mississippi
- National Register of Historic Places listings in Mississippi
