= Siege and Battle of Corinth Sites =

- Siege and Battle of Corinth
- U.S. National Register of Historic Places
- U.S. National Historic Landmark District
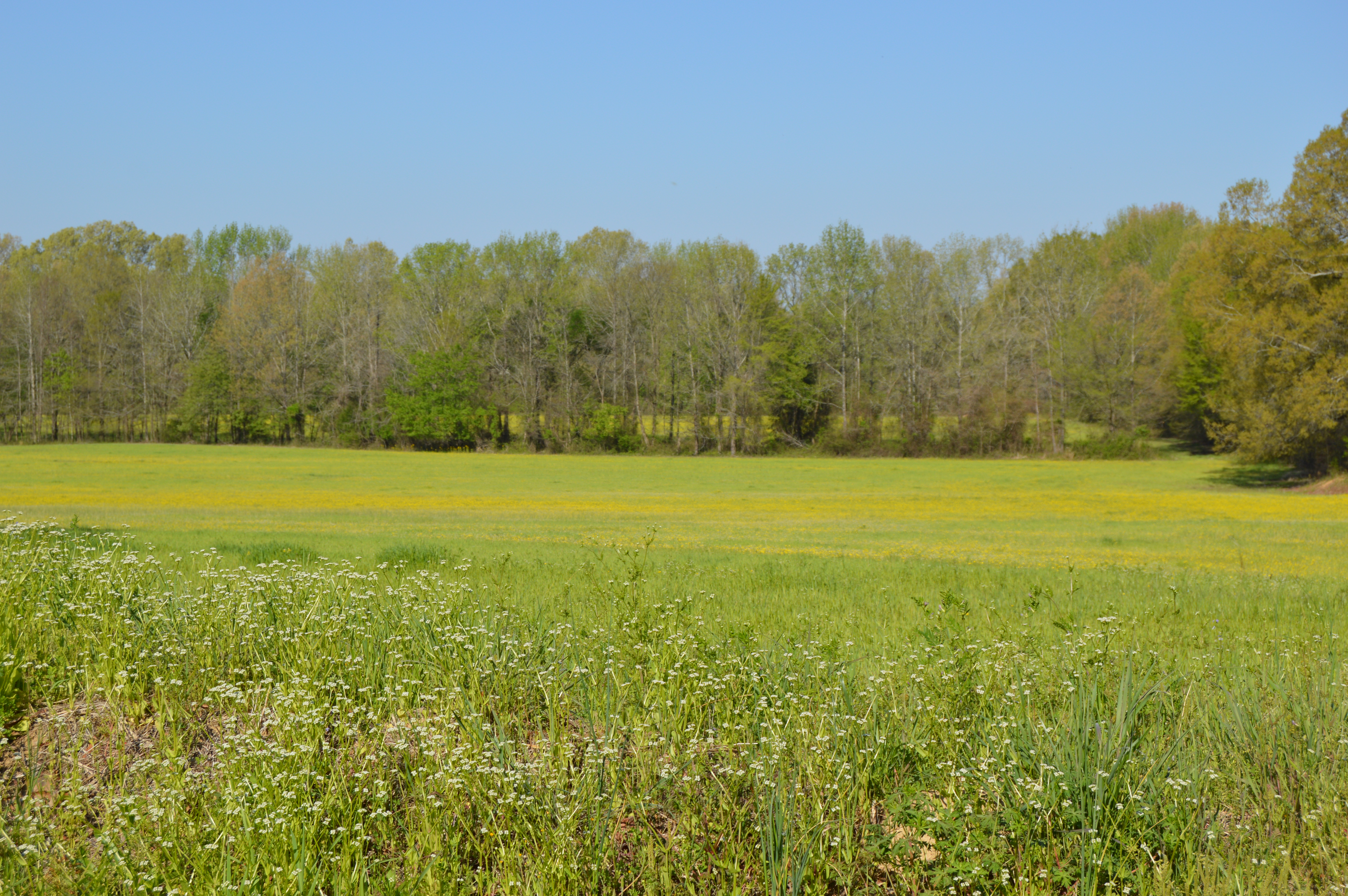
- Union field fortifications along Harper Road, north of Corinth

- Location within Mississippi Location within the United States
- Nearest city: Corinth, Mississippi
- Coordinates: 34°57′12″N 88°31′10″W
- NRHP reference No.: 91001050

Significant dates
- Added to NRHP: May 6, 1991
- Designated NHLD: May 6, 1991

The Siege and Battle of Corinth Sites are a National Historic Landmark District encompassing surviving elements of three significant American Civil War engagements in and near Corinth, Mississippi. Included are landscape and battlefield features of the siege of Corinth (April 29 to June 10, 1862), the Second Battle of Corinth (October 3–4, 1862), and the lesser known Battle of Hatchie Bridge on October 5, 1862. The district includes features located in both Alcorn County, Mississippi and Hardeman County, Tennessee, with some of the former preserved as part of Shiloh National Military Park. It was designated a landmark in 1991.

== History ==
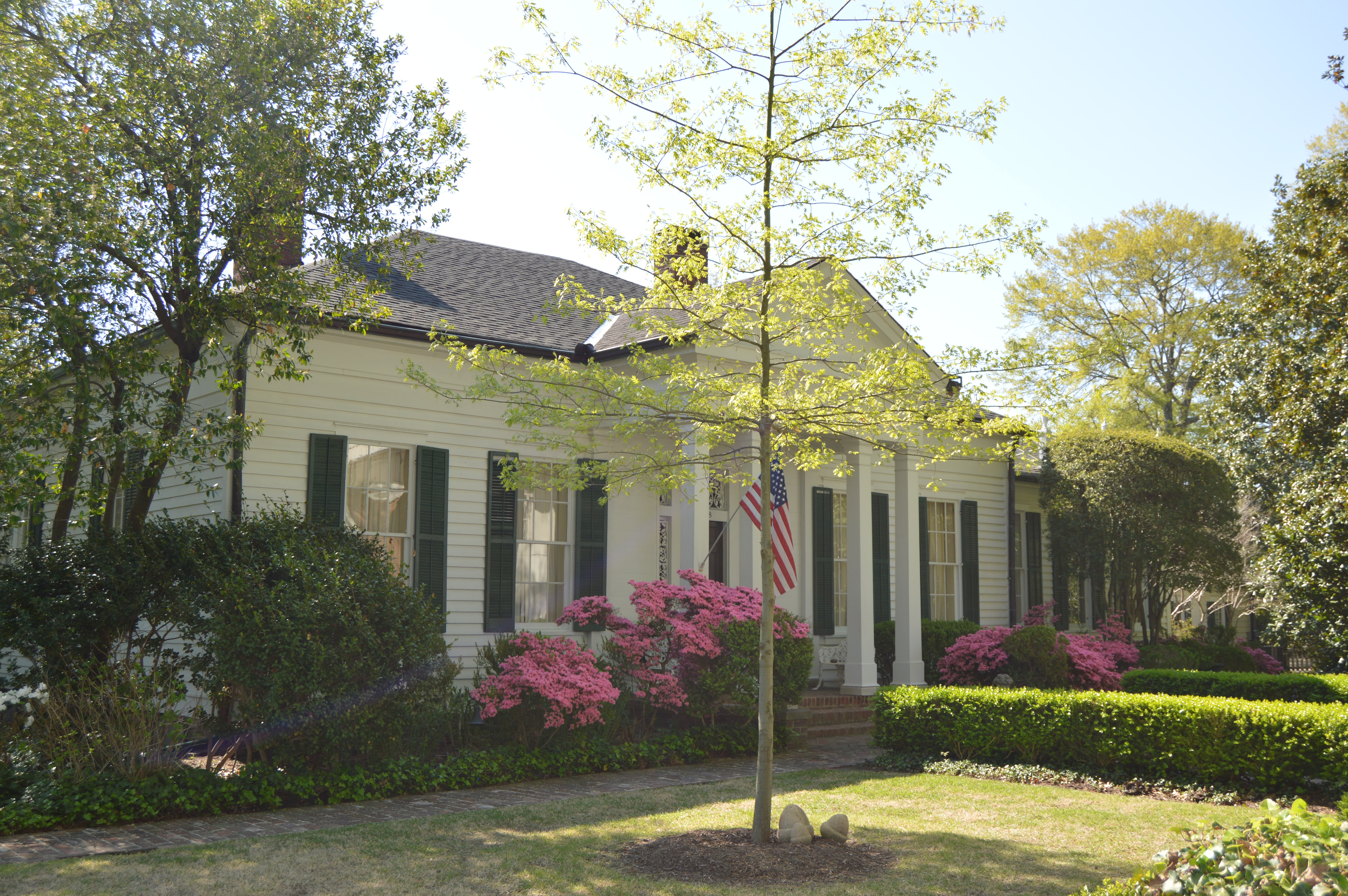
The Oak Home, Leonidas Polk's midtown Corinth headquarters.

The city of Corinth grew as a railroad town in the 1850s around the railroad crossing point of the Memphis and Charleston Railroad (opened 1857) and the Mobile and Ohio Railroad (opened 1861). This railroad junction, whose planning began in the mid-1850s, made Corinth a key economic junction point in the southern United States, and made it of critical military importance when the American Civil War broke out. Following the bloody Union victory at Shiloh in early April 1862, Confederate forces withdrew to Corinth, which they heavily fortified with earthworks and other defenses, in order to protect the critical railroad lines. The month-long siege of Corinth followed, in which Union forces again compelled the Confederates to retreat. Confederate reinforcements from the west made an attempt to recapture Corinth in the Second Battle of Corinth, but were repulsed with significant casualties. During their retreat, the Confederates were attacked in the Battle of Hatchie Bridge, near Pocahontas, Tennessee, by Union forces headed to support those at Corinth.

== Landmarked sites ==
The landmark district includes a number of discontiguous resources associated with these military movements and actions. Most of these are located in or near Corinth, and include earthworks, rifle pits, and other defensive features erected both by the Confederates (before the siege) and also the Union (after its capture). A few buildings occupied by military commanders are included, as is the actual railroad junction that was the key element of interest.

The district includes the following separate areas:

1. First Phase Battle of Corinth, 157 acres (64 ha)
2. Battery F (previously listed), 1 acre (0.40 ha)
3. Battery Robinette (previously listed), 20 acres (8.1 ha)
4. Fish Pond House, 708 Kilpatrick Street
5. Curlee House, also known as "Veranda House", 705 Jackson Street (previously listed)
6. Oak Home, 808 Fillmore Street
7. Duncan House, 810 Polk Street
8. Railroad Crossover, 1 acre (0.40 ha)
9. Confederate Earthworks between the Mobile and Ohio Railroad and the Purdy Road, 133 acres (54 ha)
10. Harper Road Union Earthworks (previously listed), 3 acres (1.2 ha)
11. Confederate Rifle Pit, less than 1 acre (0.40 ha)
12. Corinth National Cemetery (previously listed), 16 acres (6.5 ha)
13. Union Siege Line A: Maj. Gen. William T. Sherman's and Brig. Gen. Thomas A. Davies' Divisions, 105 acres (42 ha).
14. Union Siege Line B: Army of the Tennessee (Brig. Gen. Thomas McKean's and Brig. Gen. T.W. Sherman's Divisions); Army of the Ohio (Brig. Gen. T.J. Wood's and William Nelson's Divisions), 36.5 acres (14.8 ha)
15. Union Siege Line C: Army of the Mississippi (Paine's Division), 6 acres (2.4 ha)
16. Davis Bridge (Battle of Hatchie Bridge), a 5-acre (2.0 ha) area of the larger battlefield, which is also individually listed

The following National Register listings are also related to the military actions in some way, but are not part of the landmarked area:

- Battle of Corinth, Confederate Assault Position on Shiloh Road, excluded from landmark due to a loss of integrity
- Battery Williams, excluded from landmark due to a loss of integrity
- Midtown Corinth Historic District, includes four buildings listed above: Duncan House, Oak Home, the Fish Pond House, and Veranda House (a.k.a. "Curlee House"))

== See also ==
- List of National Historic Landmarks in Mississippi
- List of National Historic Landmarks in Tennessee
- National Register of Historic Places listings in Alcorn County, Mississippi
- National Register of Historic Places listings in Hardeman County, Tennessee
