= Mississippi Highway 356 =

State highway in Mississippi

Mississippi Highway 356

Route information
- Maintained by MDOT
- Length: 16.627 mi (26.759 km)
- Existed: 1956–present

Major junctions
- West end: Kossuth - Rienzi Road near Rienzi
- US 45 near Rienzi; MS 367 near Jacinto
- East end: MS 365 near Jacinto

Location
- Country: United States
- State: Mississippi
- Counties: Alcorn, Prentiss

Highway system
- Mississippi State Highway System; Interstate; US; State
← MS 355	→ MS 362

Mississippi Highway 356 (MS 356) is a 16.6-mile-long (26.7 km) east-west state highway in North Mississippi. It connects the communities of Hinkle, Pisgah, and Jacinto with the town of Rienzi.

== Route description ==
MS 356 begins at the beginning of state maintenance along Kossuth - Rienzi Road in rural Alcorn County. It heads east through a mix of farmland and woodlands, traveling over gently rolling hills for a few miles to have an intersection with US 45 and enter the town of Rienzi. The highway makes a sharp left onto Main Street, at an intersection with County Roads 443 (Robbins Street) and 442, before passing through a neighborhood. MS 356 travels through downtown, where it makes a sharp left onto Front Street before making a sharp right onto Green Street, before crossing over a railroad track and winding its way out of town along Googe Street. Leaving Rienzi, the highway crosses the Tuscumbia River and winds its way through hilly wooded terrain for the next several miles to pass through the community of Jacinto and have an intersection with MS 367. MS 356 enters Prentiss County and comes to an end a few miles later at an intersection, just two miles west of the "Divide Cut" of the Tennessee Tombigbee Waterway.

The entire length of Mississippi Highway 356 is a rural, two-lane, state highway.

== Major intersections ==
County	Location	mi	km	Destinations	Notes
Alcorn		0.000	0.000	Kossuth - Rienzi Road – Pisgah, Hinkle	Western terminus; beginning of state maintenance; road continues as Kossuth - Rienzi Road
Alcorn	Rienzi	3.070	4.941	US 45 – Corinth, Booneville	
Alcorn		13.072	21.037	MS 367 north	Southern terminus of MS 367
Prentiss		16.627	26.759	MS 365	Eastern terminus
1.000 mi = 1.609 km; 1.000 km = 0.621 mi
