= Dr. Joseph M. Bynum House =

Historic house in Mississippi, United States

- U.S. National Register of Historic Places
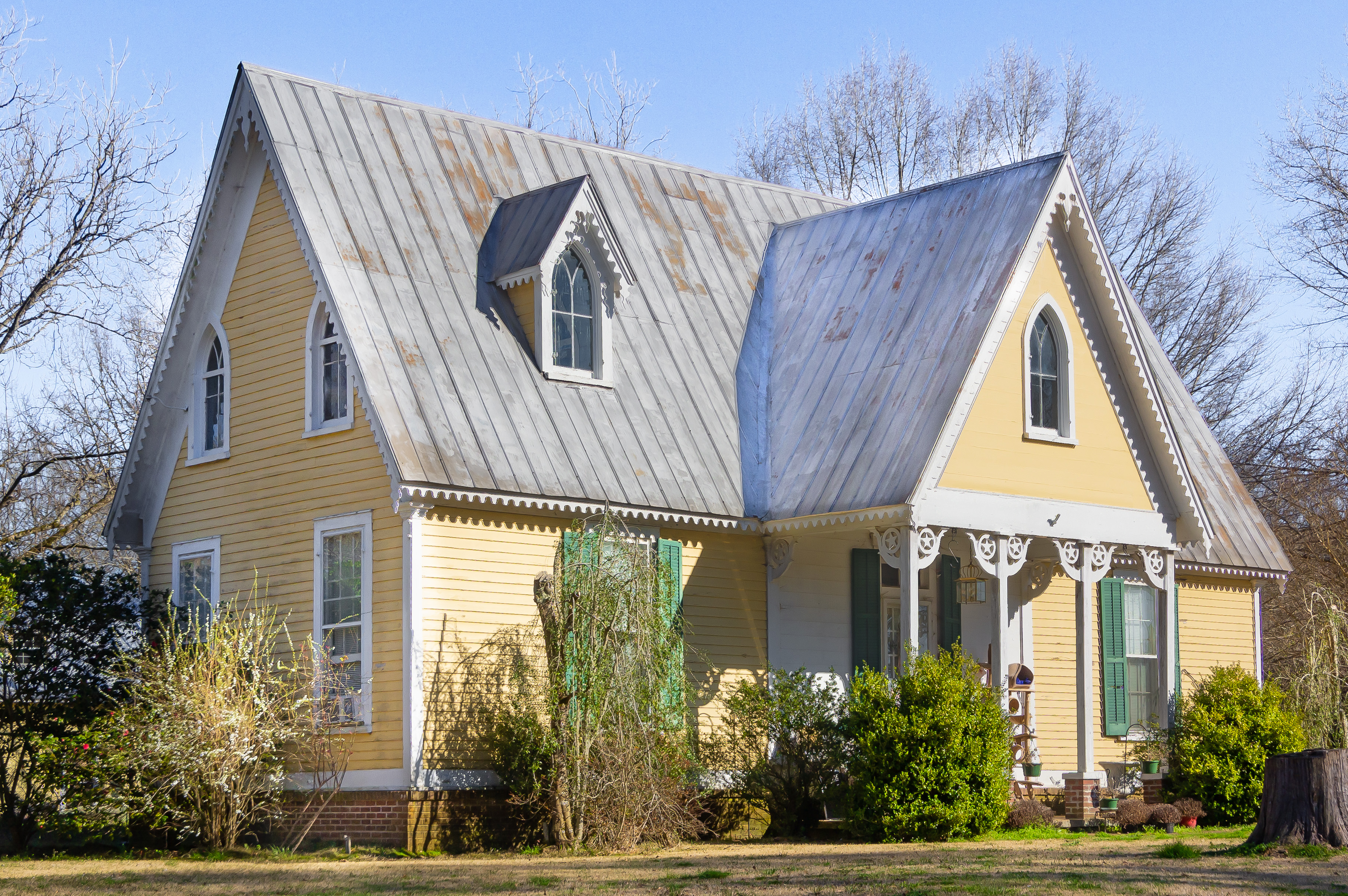

- Location within Mississippi Location within the United States
- Location: 48 S. Front St., Rienzi, Mississippi
- Coordinates: 34°45′42″N 88°31′40″W
- Area: less than one acre
- Built: 1877
- Architectural style: Late Gothic Revival
- NRHP reference No.: 96001268
- Added to NRHP: November 24, 1997

The Dr. Joseph M. Bynum House is a historic house in Rienzi, Mississippi, U.S.. It was built from 1876 to 1877 for Dr. Joseph Medicus Bynum, a physician from South Carolina. It was designed in the Gothic Revival architectural style. It has been listed on the National Register of Historic Places since November 24, 1997.
