= Boneyard, Mississippi =

- Ghost town
- Location in Mississippi Location in the United States
- Coordinates: 34°54′08″N 88°40′18″W
- Country: United States
- State: Mississippi
- County: Alcorn
- Elevation: 538 ft (164 m)
- Time zone: UTC-6 (Central (CST))
  - Summer (DST): UTC-5 (CDT)
- GNIS feature ID: 706834

Boneyard is a ghost town in Alcorn County, Mississippi, United States. It was located 8.9 mi (14.3 km) miles west of Corinth.

== History ==
Boneyard was established by William Powell in the 1830s along a stage coach route running between Jacinto, Mississippi and La Grange, Tennessee. The settlement was humorously called "Boneyard" because Powell was a very lean man. Boneyard had a cabinetmaker's shop, a blacksmith, three mercantile establishments, a cabinetmaker’s shop, a Masonic lodge (No. 179), a tan yard, a saddler's shop, the Boneyard School, and a carding machine where wool was carded for people living within a 15 mi (24 km) radius. The population reached about 100.

Boneyard was destroyed by the Union Army during the American Civil War, and was never rebuilt.
