= Big Hill Pond State Park =

State park in Tennessee, United States

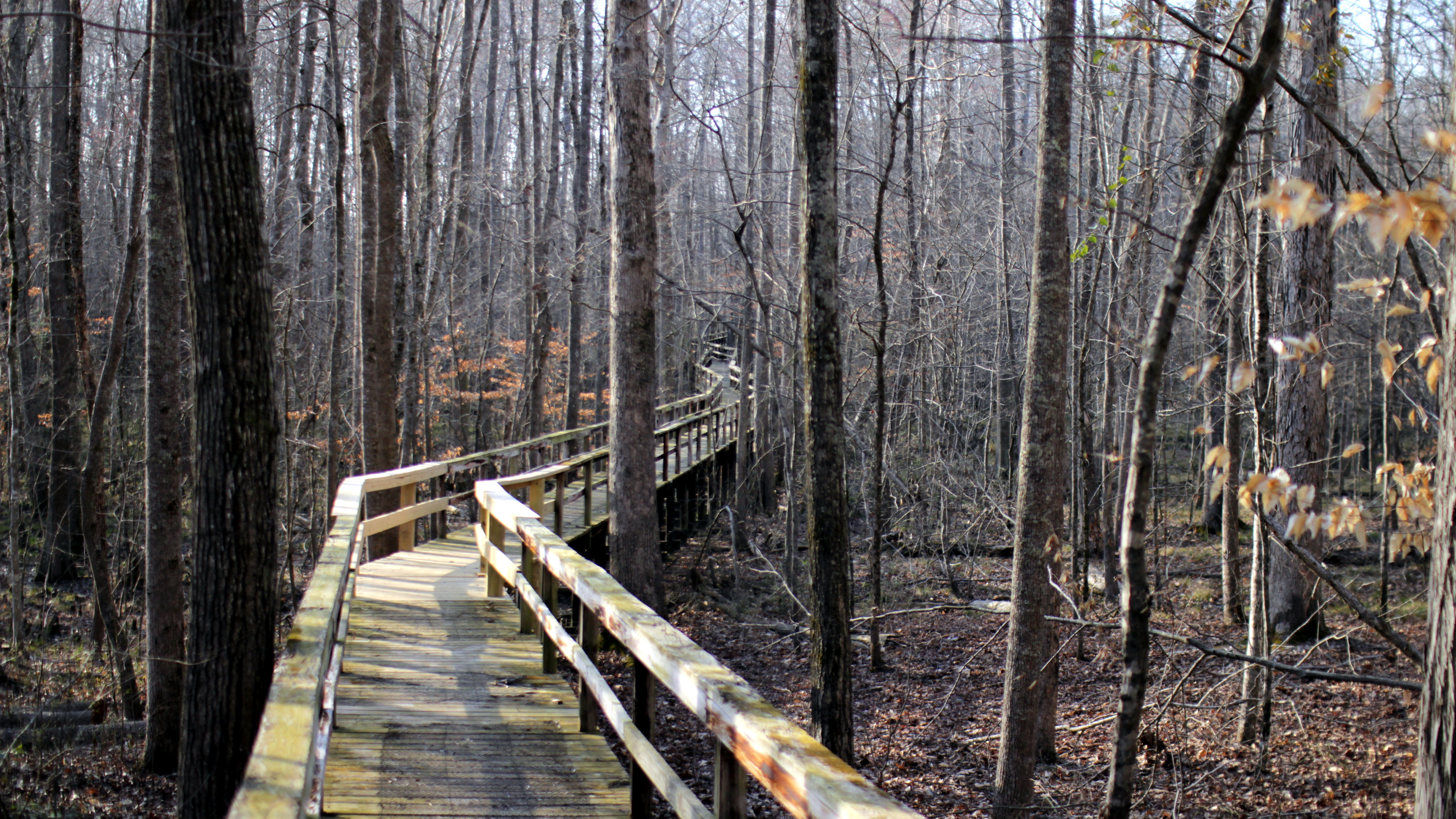
- Raised walk at Big Hill Pond State Park, March 2013
- Interactive map of Big Hill Pond State Park
- Type: Tennessee State Park
- Location: Pocahontas, Tennessee, United States
- Coordinates: 35°03′07″N 88°43′52″W
- Operator: TDEC
- Website: Big Hill Pond State Park

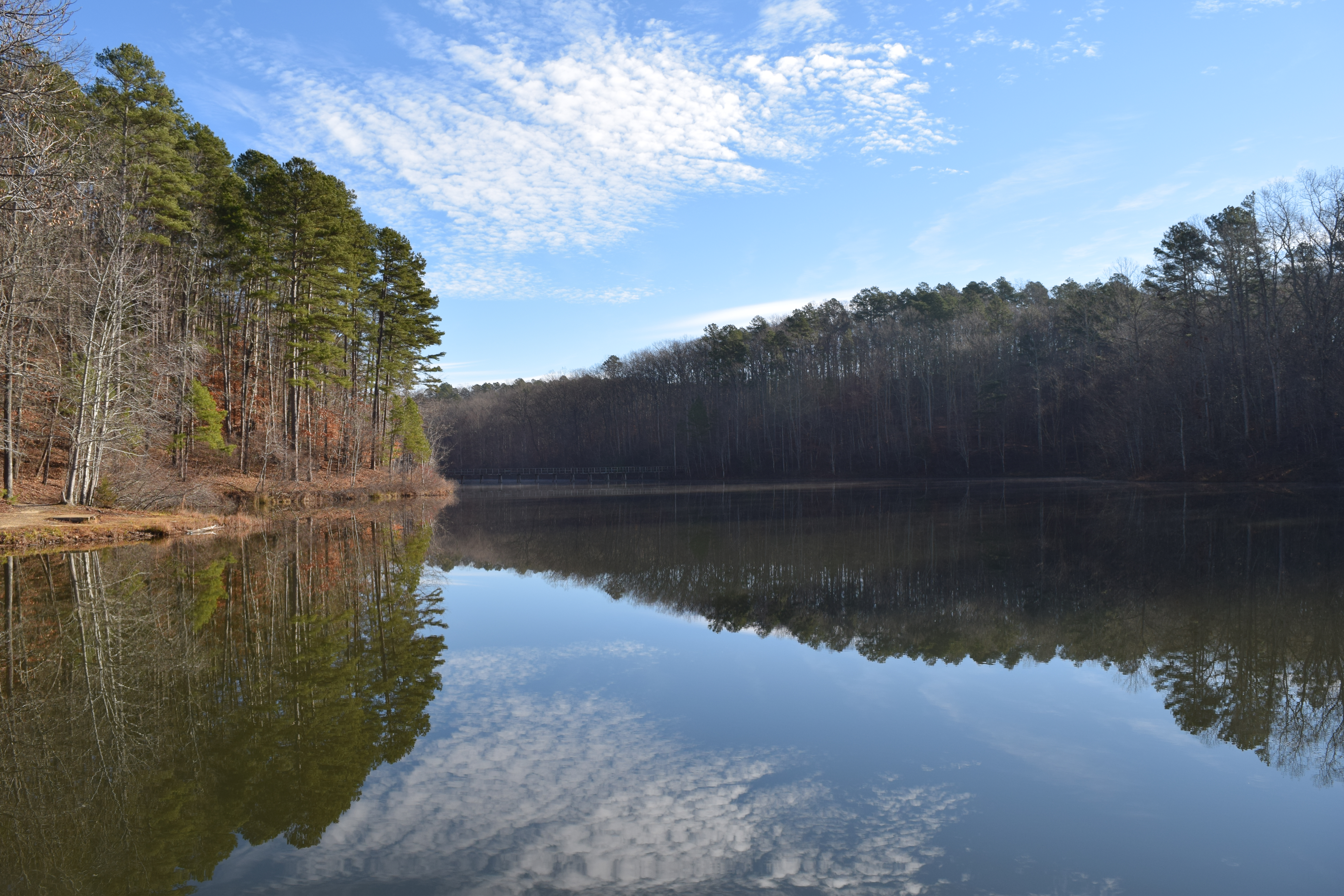
Travis McNatt Lake

Big Hill Pond State Park is a state park in the southwestern part of McNairy County in southwestern Tennessee.

== Description ==
The park has an area of 4,138 acres (16.75 km^{2}) and is forested with timberland and hardwood bottomland. Cypress Creek and the Tuscumbia River border the property. The park's central feature is 35-acre (140,000 m^{2}) Travis McNatt Lake. The namesake Big Hill Pond was formed by excavation in 1853 as a borrow pit that was a source for soil used to build a levee across the Tuscumbia and Cypress Creek bottoms for the Memphis and Charleston Railroad. In addition, the floodplains of the Tuscumbia River and Cypress Creek contain small oxbow lakes and sloughs that provide desirable habitat for waterfowl, other wildlife, and fish. A large stand of cypress trees has grown up in and around Big Hill Pond, which is accessible by four-wheel-drive vehicles. The park contains the Big Hill Pond Fortification, which was the site of Union defenses above the Memphis and Charleston Railroad during the Civil War.
