= Big Hill Pond Fortification =

- U.S. National Register of Historic Places
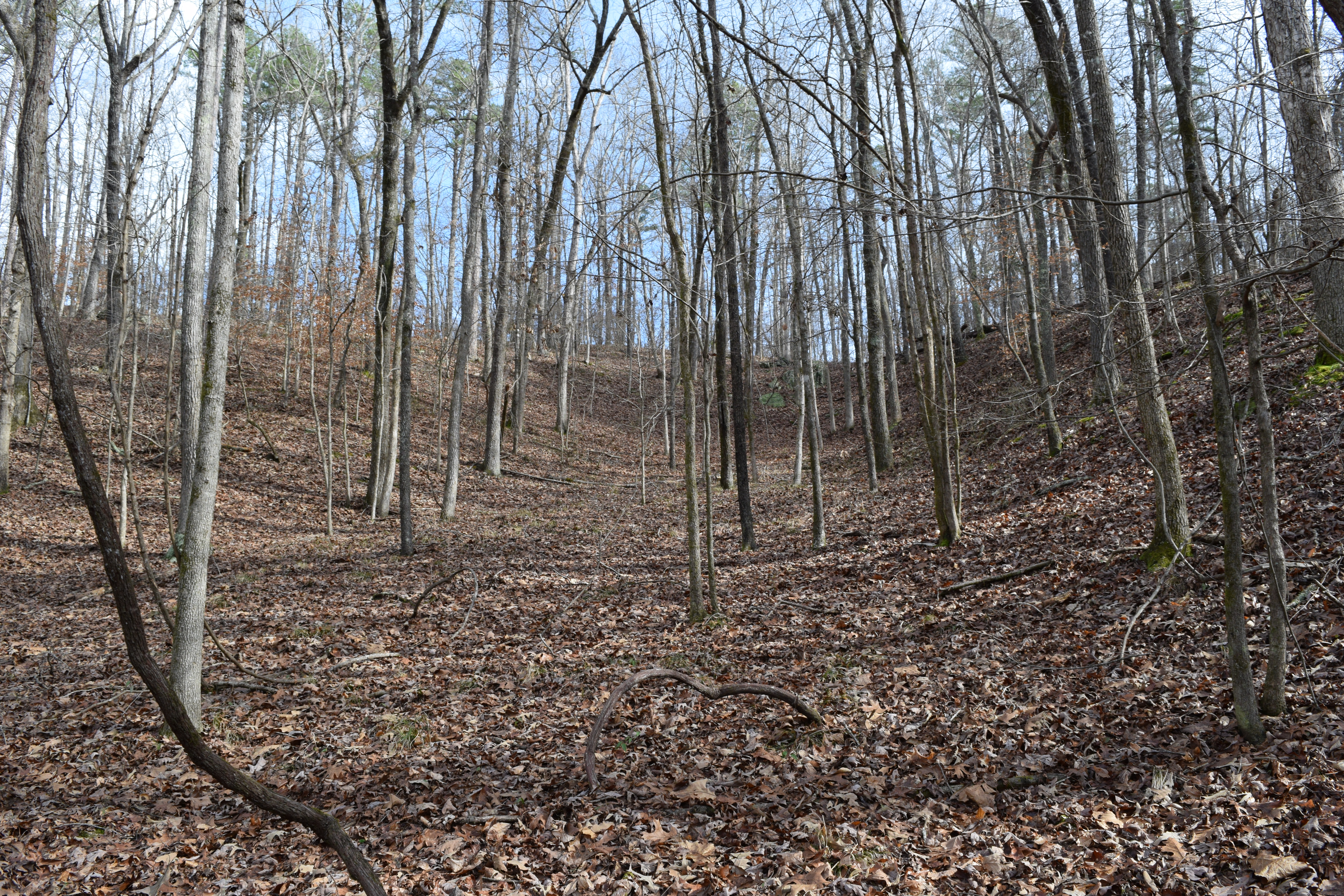
- Nearest city: Pocahontas, Tennessee
- Area: 12 acres (4.9 ha)
- Built: 1862
- MPS: Archeological Resources of the American Civil War in Tennessee MPS
- NRHP reference No.: 98001182
- Added to NRHP: September 29, 1998

The Big Hill Pond Fortification is a Civil War earthwork in Big Hill Pond State Park, which is located in McNairy County, Tennessee.

The earthwork was built atop a ridge by the Union Army in late 1862, after the Battle of Davis Bridge. It was built to guard the nearby Memphis and Charleston Railroad line. It is considered an archaeological site and was listed on the National Register of Historic Places in 1998.
