= Corinth Clothing Manufacturing Company Building =

Coordinates: 34.9317°N 88.5196°W

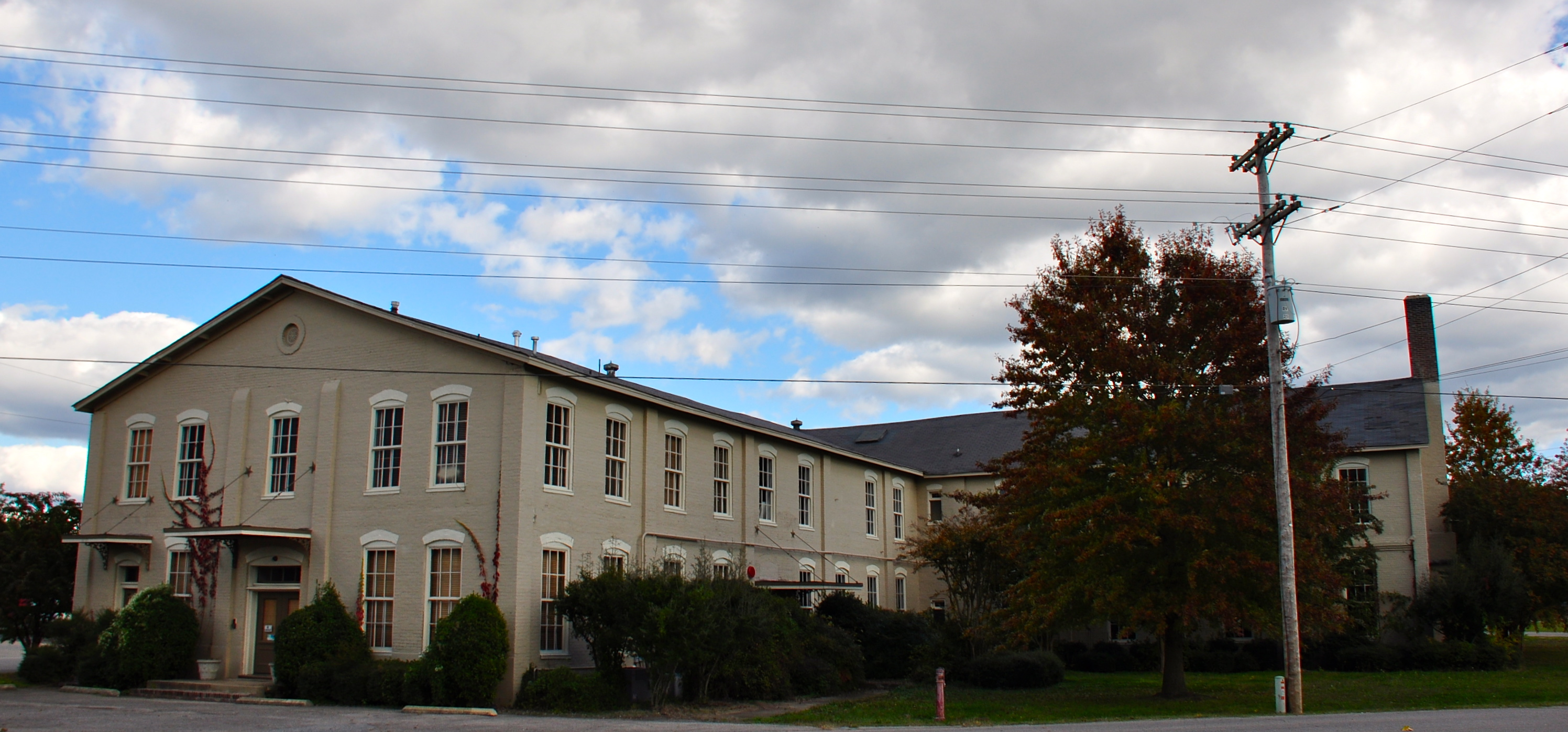

The Corinth Clothing Manufacturing Building is a historic building in Corinth, Mississippi (Alcorn County, Mississippi). It was built in 1897 and 1898. It is a Mississippi Landmark and listed on the National Register of Historic Places (National Register of Historic Places listings in Alcorn County, Mississippi). It is at 700 Tate Street. It was also used for the Adams Machine Company Building, Berry Motors Building, and Chadco Building.

Jakes E. Haynes worked for the clothing company.
