= Chewalla, Tennessee =

- Unincorporated community
- Location within Tennessee Location within the United States
- Coordinates: 35°00′48″N 88°38′47″W
- Country: United States
- State: Tennessee
- County: McNairy

Area
  - Total: 1.34 sq mi (3.47 km^{2})
  - Land: 1.34 sq mi (3.47 km^{2})
  - Water: 0 sq mi (0.00 km^{2})
- Elevation: 410 ft (120 m)

Population (2020)
  - Total: 94
  - Density: 70.1/sq mi (27.05/km^{2})
- Time zone: UTC-6 (Central (CST))
  - Summer (DST): UTC-5 (CDT)
- ZIP code: 38393
- Area code: 731
- GNIS feature ID: 1280430

Chewalla is an unincorporated community in McNairy County, Tennessee, United States. Chewalla is located on Tennessee State Route 234 and the Norfolk Southern Railway 4.1 miles (6.6 km) south-southwest of Ramer. Chewalla has a post office with ZIP code 38393.

Chewalla had its start when the railroad was extended to that point. The name Chewalla is derived from a Native American language.

== Demographics ==
Historical population
Census	Pop.	Note	%±
2020	94		—
U.S. Decennial Census
