= MS 365 =

MS 365 may refer to:

- Mississippi Highway 365
- Microsoft 365
