= Theo, Mississippi =

- Unincorporated community
- Location within Mississippi Location within the United States
- Coordinates: 34°55′51″N 88°41′51″W
- Country: United States
- State: Mississippi
- County: Alcorn
- Elevation: 505 ft (154 m)
- Time zone: UTC-6 (Central (CST))
  - Summer (DST): UTC-5 (CDT)
- ZIP code: 38834
- Area code: 662
- GNIS feature ID: 678671

Theo is an unincorporated community in Alcorn County, Mississippi, United States. Theo is located about 4.5 miles (7.2 km) south of the Tennessee border. The community is on U.S. Highway 72 about 12 miles (19 km) west of Corinth.

Located in a subtropical environment, the area has a mosaic forest, with notably hot, humid summers.

== Services ==
Theo is a small, rural residential community with few services.

Emergency services are provided by the Union Center Theo Volunteer Fire Department, across the Tippah County line in Walnut, Mississippi.

Theo does not have its own post office as of 2014; it shares ZIP code 38834 with Kossuth and Corinth. However, at some time in the past, it did have its own post office. In the late 19th century it had between 20 and 68 residents. In the 1890s, the area was quite busy, and while there were roads and several post offices in surrounding communities, there was no train station in Theo.
