= Mississippi Highway 365 =

Highway in Mississippi

Mississippi Highway 365
- MS 365 highlighted in pink

Route information
- Maintained by MDOT
- Length: 23.278 mi (37.462 km)
- Existed: 1950–present

Major junctions
- South end: MS 30 in Burton
- US 72 near Burnsville
- North end: MS 25 near Pickwick Lake

Location
- Country: United States
- State: Mississippi
- Counties: Prentiss, Tishomingo

Highway system
- Mississippi State Highway System; Interstate; US; State
← MS 364	→ MS 366

Mississippi Highway 365 (MS 365) is a state highway in northeastern Mississippi. The route starts at MS 30 in Burton and travels northward. It travels into Burnsville and intersects U.S. Route 72 (US 72). MS 365 continues northeastward and ends at MS 25 west of Pickwick Lake. The route was designated by 1950, connecting from MS 30 to MS 364. It was extended northward to MS 356 around 1958 and was completely paved by 1964. The route replaced parts of MS 356 in 1965, and its northern terminus was changed to MS 25.

== Route description ==
Traffic volume on Mississippi Highway 365
Location	Volume
Northwest of CO 2312	1,000
North of CO 2360	890
South of CO 1461	2,000
Northeast of CO 205	2,300
South of US 72	3,300
North of Holt Avenue	2,000
Southwest of CO 302	1,400
Data was measured in 2017 in terms of AADT; Source: Mississippi Department of Transportation

The route is located in northeastern Prentiss and western Tishomingo counties. MS 365 is legally defined in Mississippi Code § 65-3-3, and all of it is maintained by the Mississippi Department of Transportation (MDOT), as part of the Mississippi State Highway System.

MS 365 starts at a three-way junction with MS 30 in the unincorporated community of Burton of Prentiss County, and it travels northwards through a forested area. The route intersects County Road 2312 (CO 2312) and turns northwest briefly. Past CO 2321, the road begins travelling in a straight line until it reaches CO 2360. After the intersection, MS 365 crosses over Dead Man Branch and reaches the community of Cairo. Inside Cairo, the route intersects MS 364. The road then meets the eastern terminus of MS 356 after intersecting CO 1461. At CO 205, the route enters Tishomingo County.

Inside Tishomingo County, the route turns northeastward and crosses over the Redmont Railway near Holt Spur. MS 365 then turns north at CO 160, and crosses Berea Creek near CO 265, a road leading to Leedy. Travelling along the Tennessee–Tombigbee Waterway, the road enters the corporate limits of Burnsville north of CO 212. MS 365 meets US 72 at a partial cloverleaf interchange near the center of the town, and crosses over Front Street, a Norfolk Southern railroad, and Pine Street respectively. The road intersects a connector to Pine Street, and leaves the town north of CO 294. It crosses Little Yellow and Caney creeks near CO 298 and turns northeast. In Doskie, the route intersects CO 293, which leads to a fishing area. MS 365 continues through the forested area, intersecting CO 303 and CO 306 northwest of Cross Roads. Past CO 326, the route turns east and ends at MS 25. The road continues eastward as CO 306, ending at a dead end west of Pickwick Lake.

== History ==
The gravel road that became MS 365 existed since 1928 in northeastern Prentiss County, and it became part of MS 30 in 1936. The designation switched to MS 32 in 1942 for a year, and was removed in 1943, leaving the route unnumbered. By 1950, MS 365 was designated, from MS 30 to MS 364. In 1957, MS 365 was extended south to MS 4, but it was removed the next year. Instead it was extended north to MS 356, south of Burnsville. In 1959, a $246,395 (equivalent to $2,657,747 in 2024) project to pave a 6.338-mile-long (10.200 km) section of the road from Burton to Cairo started. Four years later, another part of the route from Cairo to Burnsville began grading and adding drainage and culverts. All of MS 365 was paved by 1964. By 1965, MS 365 replaced MS 356 north of Burnsville, and MS 356's eastern terminus changed to MS 365.

== Major intersections ==
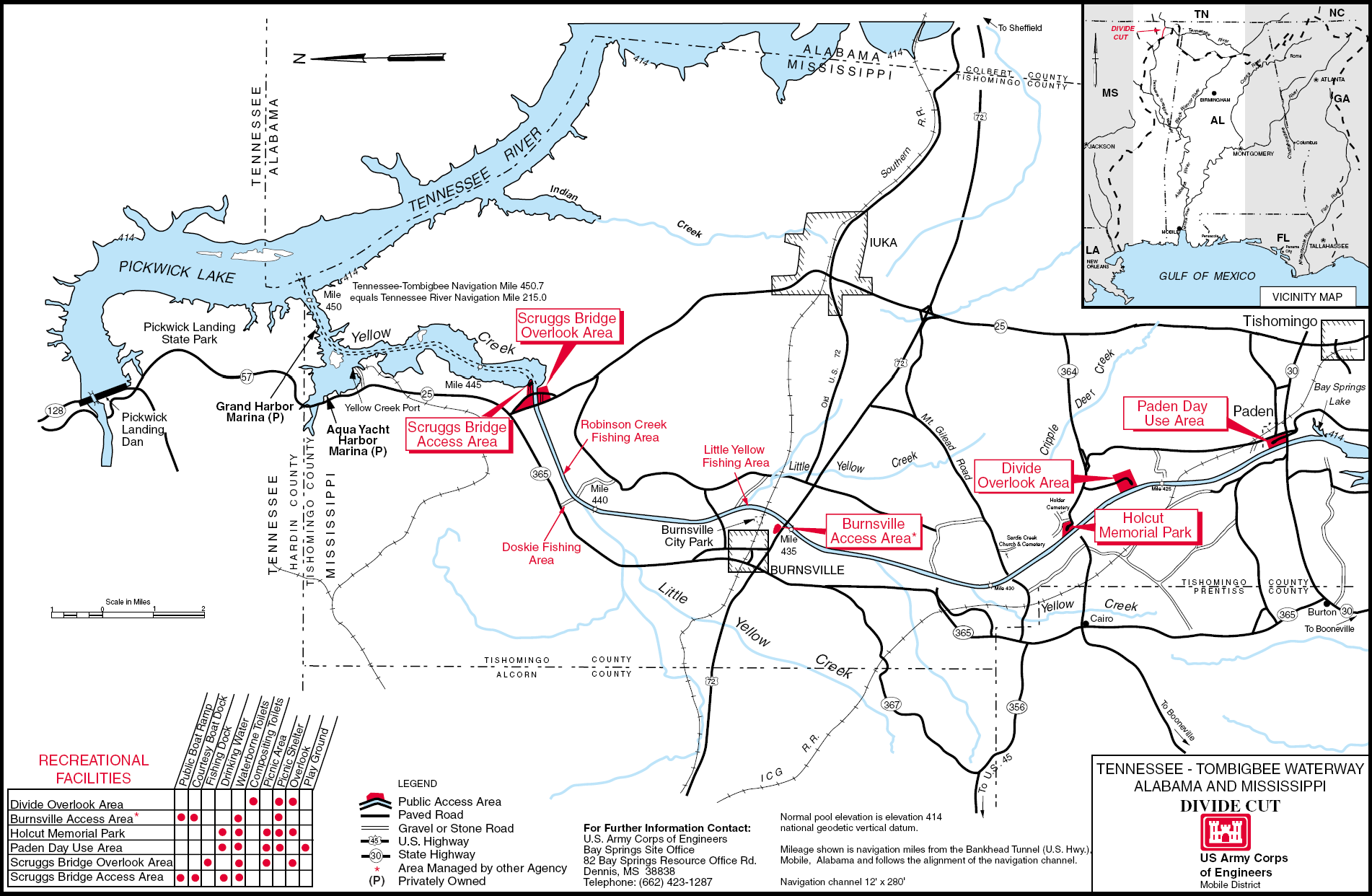
Map of the Divide Cut (part of the Tennessee–Tombigbee Waterway) and MS 365

County	Location	mi	km	Destinations	Notes
Prentiss	Burton	0.0	0.0	MS 30 – Tishomingo, Booneville	Southern terminus
Prentiss		6.3	10.1	MS 364 west – Booneville	Eastern terminus of MS 364's western segment
Prentiss		7.6	12.2	MS 356 west – Jacinto, Rienzi	Eastern terminus of MS 356
Tishomingo	Burnsville	14.5– 14.8	23.3– 23.8	US 72 – Corinth, Burnsville, Iuka	Partial cloverleaf interchange
Tishomingo		23.3	37.5	MS 25 – Pickwick Dam, TN, Iuka	Northern terminus
1.000 mi = 1.609 km; 1.000 km = 0.621 mi

== See also ==
- List of Mississippi state highways
