= Gateway Lanes =

Historic building in Mississippi

- U.S. National Register of Historic Places
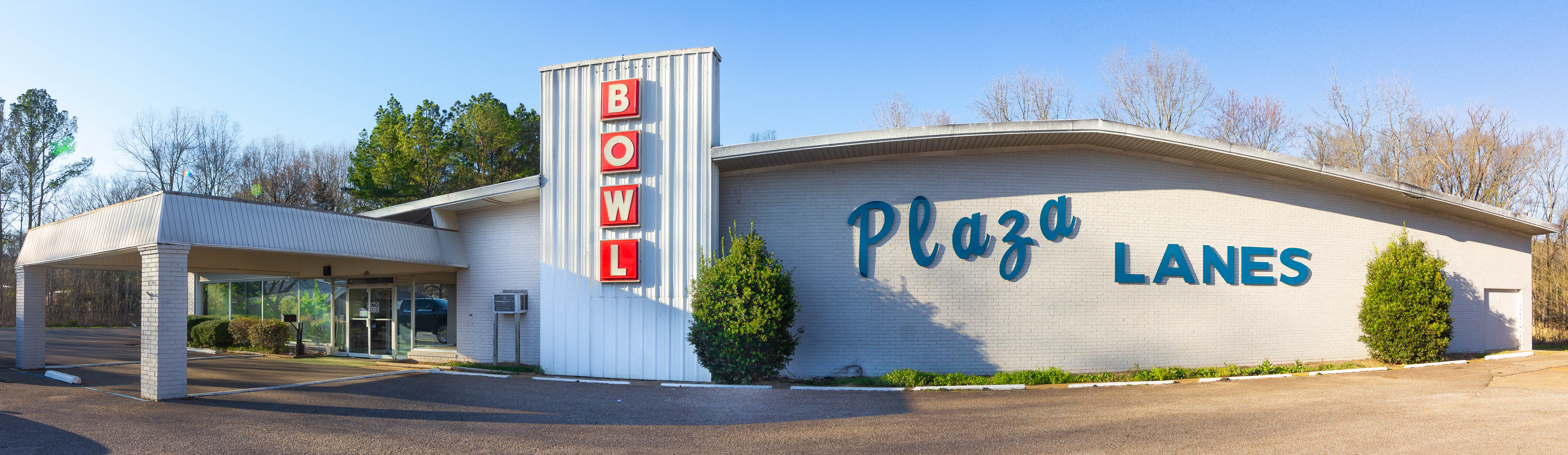
- Gateway Lanes in 2022
- Location: Corinth, Mississippi
- Built: 1960
- NRHP reference No.: 100003949
- Added to NRHP: May 17, 2019

Gateway Lanes, formerly Plaza Lanes, is a historic bowling alley in Corinth, Mississippi, located on 512 Taylor Street. It is listed on the National Register of Historic Places.

The building was built in 1960, and the original 16 Brunswick lanes, front desk, and restaurant are still in use.

== See also ==
- National Register of Historic Places listings in Alcorn County, Mississippi
