= Doskie, Mississippi =

- Unincorporated community
- Location within Mississippi Location within the United States
- Coordinates: 34°54′21″N 88°17′42″W
- Country: United States
- State: Mississippi
- County: Tishomingo
- Elevation: 456 ft (139 m)
- Time zone: UTC-6 (Central (CST))
  - Summer (DST): UTC-5 (CDT)
- ZIP code: 38833
- Area code: 662

Doskie is an unincorporated community located on Mississippi Highway 365 in Tishomingo County, Mississippi, United States. Doskie is just north of the Tennessee–Tombigbee Waterway, approximately 6 miles (9.7 km) north of Burnsville and approximately 13 miles (21 km) northwest of Iuka.
