= Lester Carpenter =

American politician

Lester E. Carpenter
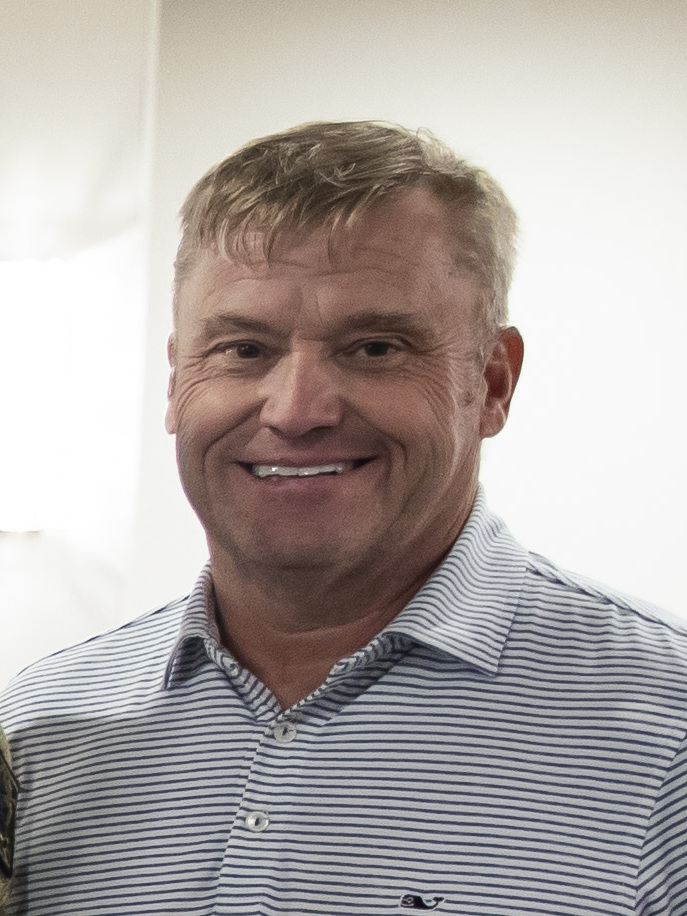
- Carpenter in 2025

Member of the Mississippi House of Representatives from the 1st district
- Incumbent
- Assumed office 2008
- Preceded by: Ricky Cummings

Personal details
- Born: September 1, 1970 (age 55)
- Party: Republican

Lester E. "Bubba" Carpenter (born September 1, 1970) is a Republican member of the Mississippi House of Representatives, representing the First District of Mississippi (Alcorn and Tishomingo Counties) since 2008.

== Tenure ==
In the Legislature, he is active in these committees: Interstate Cooperation, of which he serves as Vice Chairman, Banking and Financial Services, Corrections, County Affairs, Medicaid, Municipalities, and Tourism. District 1 covers portions of Tishomingo and Alcorn counties of Mississippi.

== Career ==
A paramedic by profession, Carpenter also serves as President of the Burnsville Area Chamber of Commerce, and is a member of the National Association of Emergency Medical Technicians and the Tishomingo County Economic Development Board. He graduated from Burnsville High School in Burnsville, Mississippi, attended Northeast Mississippi Community College in Booneville, Mississippi, and completed paramedic school at Wallace State Community College in Hanceville, Alabama. He is a veteran of the 155th Armored Brigade, Mississippi Army National Guard, with service in Operation Desert Storm in 1991.

== Personal life ==
Carpenter is a lifelong resident of Burnsville, Mississippi; he is of the Baptist faith, is married, and has one child.
