= Biggersville, Mississippi =

- Census-designated place
- Location within Mississippi Location within the United States
- Coordinates: 34°50′12″N 88°33′50″W
- Country: United States
- State: Mississippi
- County: Alcorn

Area
  - Total: 2.00 sq mi (5.19 km^{2})
  - Land: 2.00 sq mi (5.19 km^{2})
  - Water: 0 sq mi (0.00 km^{2})
- Elevation: 466 ft (142 m)

Population (2020)
  - Total: 205
  - Density: 102.4/sq mi (39.52/km^{2})
- Time zone: UTC-6 (Central (CST))
  - Summer (DST): UTC-5 (CDT)
- ZIP code: 38834, 38865
- Area code: 662
- FIPS code: 28-06100
- GNIS feature ID: 2812711

Biggersville is a census-designated place and unincorporated community in Alcorn County, Mississippi, United States. It lies along U.S. Route 45 six miles south of Corinth in the northeastern part of the state. Biggersville is home to Biggersville High School and several small businesses. Per the 2020 Census, the population was 205.

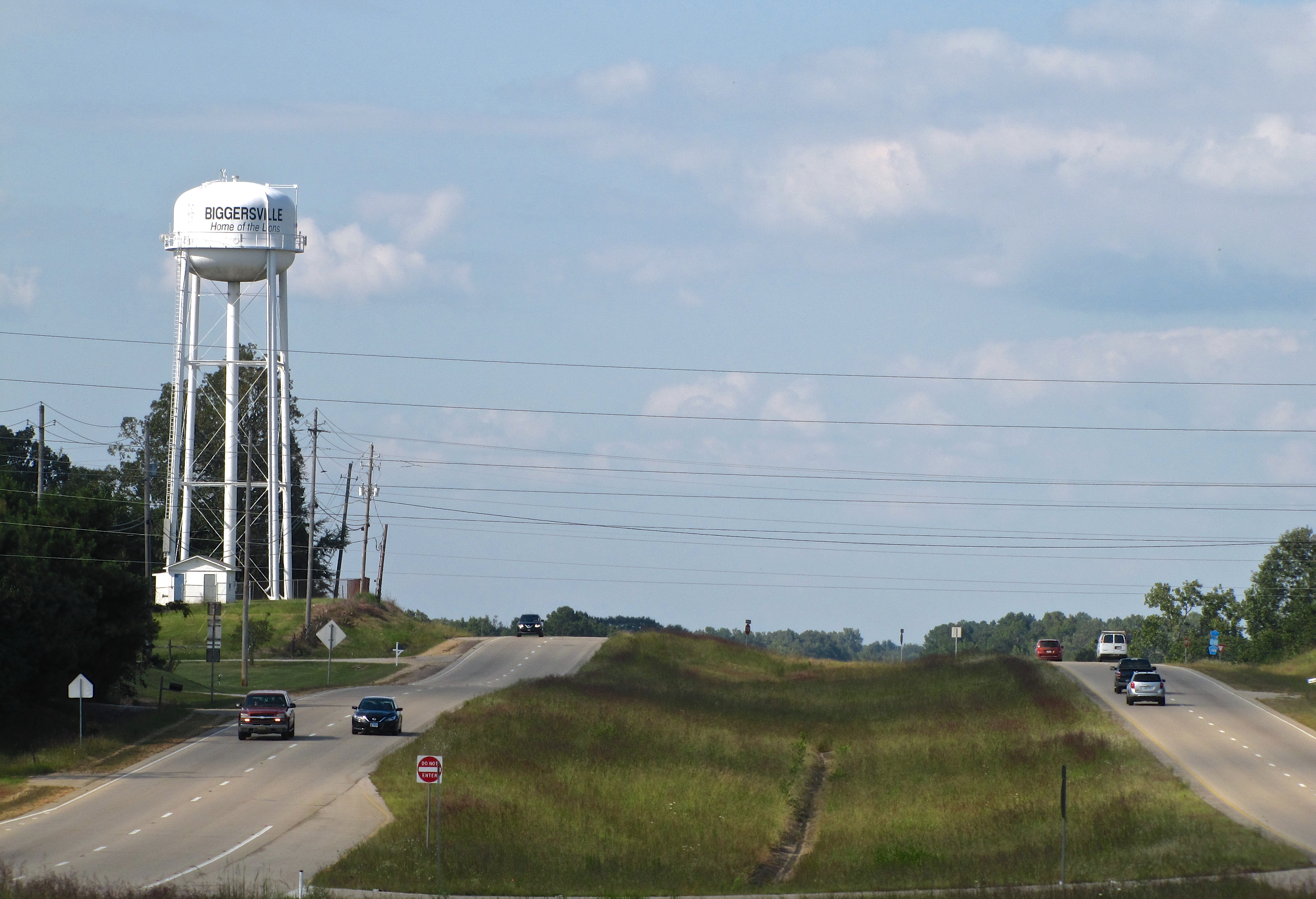
U.S. Route 45 and Biggersville water tower

== Demographics ==
Historical population
Census	Pop.	Note	%±
2020	205		—
U.S. Decennial Census; 2020

Biggersville was first listed as a census designated place in the 2020 U.S. census.

=== 2020 census ===
Biggersville CDP, Mississippi – Racial and ethnic composition Note: the US Census treats Hispanic/Latino as an ethnic category. This table excludes Latinos from the racial categories and assigns them to a separate category. Hispanics/Latinos may be of any race.
Race / Ethnicity (NH = Non-Hispanic)	Pop 2020	% 2020
White alone (NH)	172	83.906%
Black or African American alone (NH)	20	9.76%
Native American or Alaska Native alone (NH)	0	0.00%
Asian alone (NH)	0	0.00%
Native Hawaiian or Pacific Islander alone (NH)	0	0.00%
Other race alone (NH)	0	0.00%
Mixed race or Multiracial (NH)	12	5.85%
Hispanic or Latino (any race)	1	0.49%
Total	205	100.00%
