= Wenasoga, Mississippi =

- Unincorporated community
- Location within Mississippi Location within the United States
- Coordinates: 34°59′13″N 88°35′26″W
- Country: United States
- State: Mississippi
- County: Alcorn
- Elevation: 476 ft (145 m)
- Time zone: UTC-6 (Central (CST))
  - Summer (DST): UTC-5 (CDT)
- Area code: 662
- GNIS feature ID: 679442

Wenasoga, also known as Sogie, is an unincorporated community in northern Alcorn County, Mississippi, United States. It is situated northwest of Corinth near the Tennessee border.

A post office operated under the name Wenasoga from 1875 to 1973.
