= Burnsville, Mississippi =

- Town
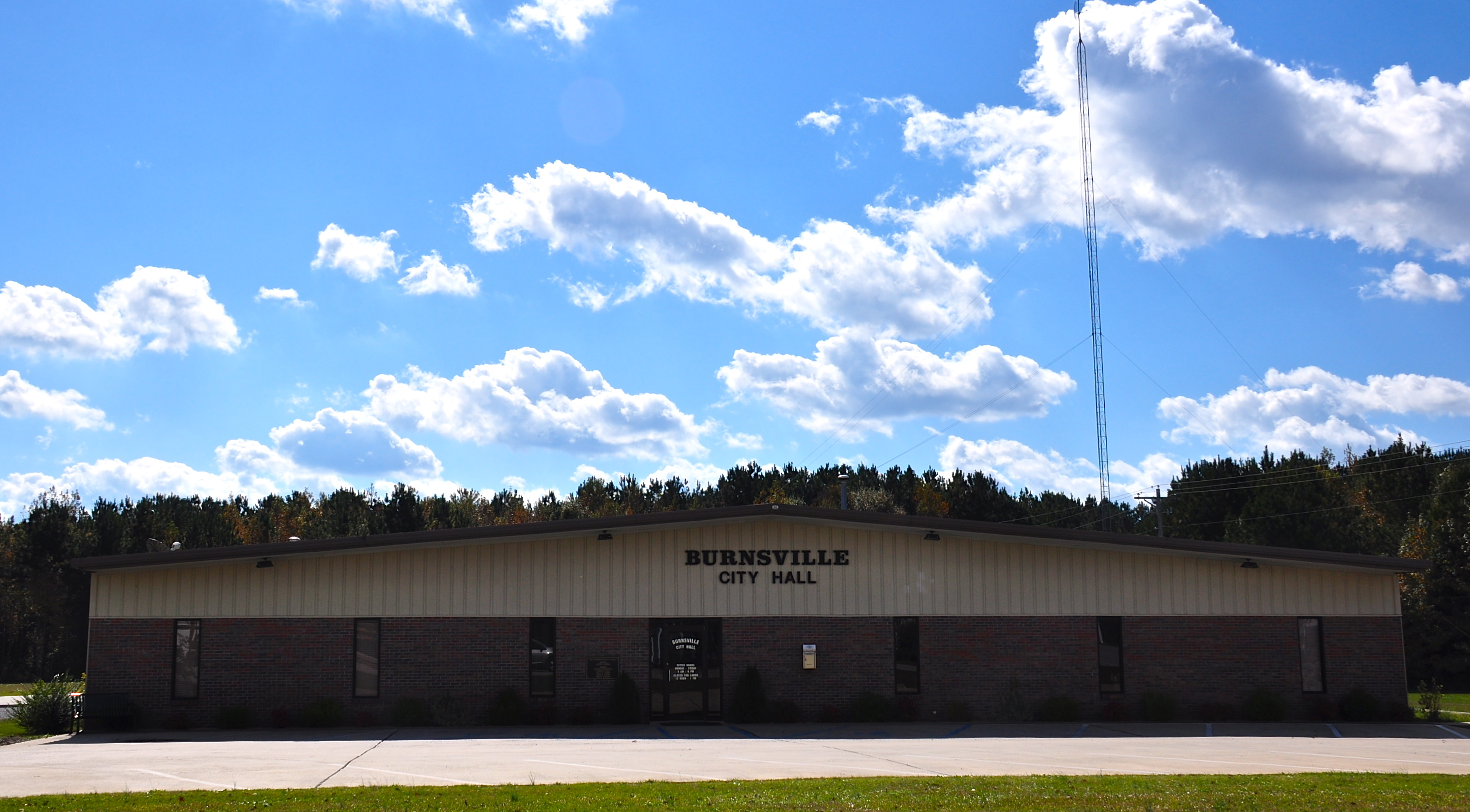
- Burnsville City Hall

- Location of Burnsville, Mississippi

- Location in the United States
- Coordinates: 34°50′05″N 88°19′04″W
- Country: United States
- State: Mississippi
- County: Tishomingo

Area
  - Total: 4.79 sq mi (12.41 km^{2})
  - Land: 4.77 sq mi (12.36 km^{2})
  - Water: 0.019 sq mi (0.05 km^{2})
- Elevation: 466 ft (142 m)

Population (2020)
  - Total: 868
  - Density: 181.9/sq mi (70.25/km^{2})
- Time zone: UTC-6 (Central (CST))
  - Summer (DST): UTC-5 (CDT)
- ZIP code: 38833
- Area code: 662
- FIPS code: 28-09820
- GNIS feature ID: 2405349
- Website: burnsvillems.com

Burnsville is a town in Tishomingo County in northeastern Mississippi, United States. As of the 2020 census, Burnsville had a population of 868.

== Geography ==
Burnsville is located on the west side of the Tennessee–Tombigbee Waterway. The town is at the intersection of US Route 72 and Mississippi Highway 365. U.S. 72 runs from west to east through the southern part of the town, leading southeast 8 mi (13 km) to Iuka, the county seat of Tishomingo County, and northwest 14 mi (23 km) to Corinth. MS Highway 365 runs through the main part of town from north to south, leading north 6 mi (9.7 km) to Doskie and south to Bay Springs Lake.

According to the United States Census Bureau, the town has a total area of 4.8 square miles (12 km^{2}), of which 4.8 square miles (12 km^{2}) is land and 0.04 square miles (0.10 km^{2}) (0.42%) is water.

=== Rivers and streams ===
- Little Yellow Creek
- Yellow Creek
- Tennessee-Tombigbee Waterway

=== Other formations ===
- Turnpike Hill lies just east of the town on the east side of the Tennessee-Tombigbee Waterway.

== Demographics ==
Historical population
| Census | Pop. | Note | %± |
|---|---|---|---|
| 1880 | 240 | | — |
| 1890 | 318 | | 32.5% |
| 1900 | 222 | | −30.2% |
| 1910 | 336 | | 51.4% |
| 1920 | 363 | | 8.0% |
| 1930 | 404 | | 11.3% |
| 1940 | 449 | | 11.1% |
| 1950 | 525 | | 16.9% |
| 1960 | 416 | | −20.8% |
| 1970 | 435 | | 4.6% |
| 1980 | 889 | | 104.4% |
| 1990 | 949 | | 6.7% |
| 2000 | 1,034 | | 9.0% |
| 2010 | 936 | | −9.5% |
| 2020 | 868 | | −7.3% |
U.S. Decennial Census

=== 2020 census ===
Burnsville racial composition
| Race | Num. | Perc. |
|---|---|---|
| White (non-Hispanic) | 803 | 92.51% |
| Black or African American (non-Hispanic) | 4 | 0.46% |
| Native American | 5 | 0.58% |
| Asian | 1 | 0.12% |
| Other/Mixed | 35 | 4.03% |
| Hispanic or Latino | 20 | 2.3% |

As of the 2020 United States census, there were 868 people, 353 households, and 199 families residing in the town.

=== 2000 census ===
As of the census of 2000, there were 1,034 people, 412 households, and 285 families residing in the town. The population density was 217.6 people per square mile (84.0 people/km^{2}). There were 465 housing units at an average density of 97.8 per square mile (37.8/km^{2}). The racial makeup of the town was 98.07% White, 0.39% Native American, and 1.55% from two or more races. Hispanic or Latino of any race were 1.26% of the population.

There were 412 households, out of which 35.7% had children under the age of 18 living with them, 47.1% were married couples living together, 17.2% had a female householder with no husband present, and 30.6% were non-families. 29.1% of all households were made up of individuals, and 10.7% had someone living alone who was 65 years of age or older. The average household size was 2.51 and the average family size was 3.06.

In the town, the population was spread out, with 29.7% under the age of 18, 9.8% from 18 to 24, 27.1% from 25 to 44, 23.9% from 45 to 64, and 9.6% who were 65 years of age or older. The median age was 32 years. For every 100 females there were 87.3 males. For every 100 females age 18 and over, there were 82.7 males.

The median income for a household in the town was $20,083, and the median income for a family was $27,679. Males had a median income of $28,523 versus $18,333 for females. The per capita income for the town was $12,359. About 23.5% of families and 27.4% of the population were below the poverty line, including 34.8% of those under age 18 and 27.9% of those age 65 or over.

== Education ==
=== Public schools ===
- Burnsville Elementary - grades K-8 with an enrollment of 498 students

=== Libraries ===
- Burnsville Public Library - has a collection of ~179,000 books and serial volumes

== Transportation ==
=== Highways ===
- U.S. Route 72 - an east–west corridor that runs from Chattanooga, Tennessee to Memphis
- Mississippi Highway 365 - runs north–south through Tishomingo County

=== Railroads ===
- Southern Railway System

== Media ==
- WOWL 91.9 FM radio, owned by Southern Community Services, Inc.

== Notable people ==
- Lester Carpenter, member of the Mississippi House of Representatives representing the First District of Mississippi
