= Midtown Corinth Historic District =

Historic district in Mississippi, United States

- U.S. National Register of Historic Places
- U.S. Historic district
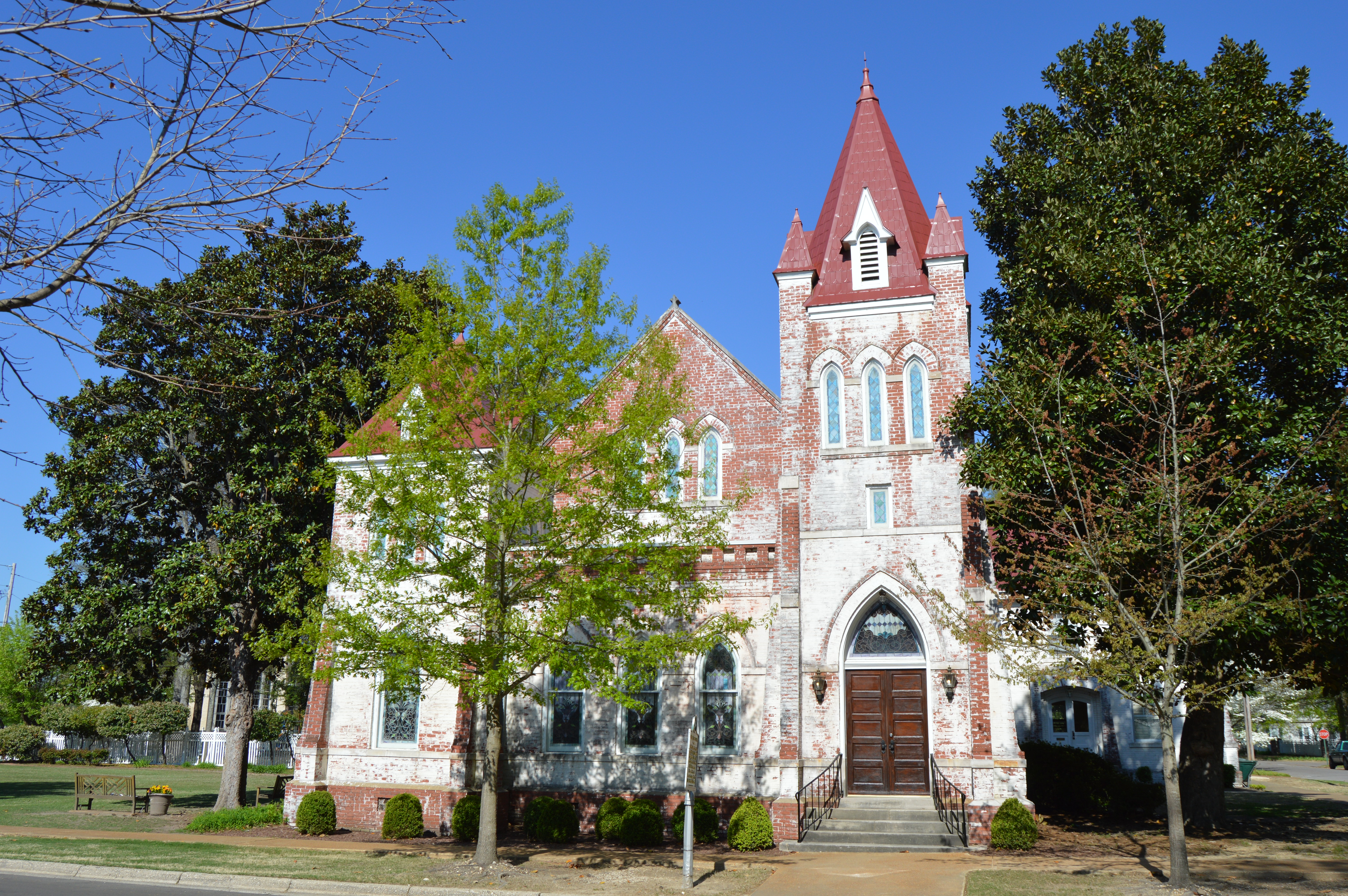
- Methodist chapel at Bunch and Fillmore

- Location within Mississippi Location within the United States
- Location: Roughly bounded by Cass, Bunch, Washington, Main, Filmore, Linden, Douglas and Cruise Sts., Corinth, Mississippi
- Coordinates: 34°56′11″N 88°31′3″W
- Area: 84 acres (34 ha)
- Built: 1855
- Architect: Liddon, Benjamin F.; Unknown
- Architectural style: Colonial Revival, Late Victorian, Bungalow/Craftsman
- NRHP reference No.: 93001433
- Added to NRHP: December 23, 1993

Midtown Corinth Historic District is a historic district in Corinth, Mississippi that was listed on the National Register of Historic Places in 1993. The district then had 229 contributing buildings and one contributing site, as well as 55 non-contributing buildings. The district "is roughly bounded by Cass, Bunch, Washington, Main, Filmore, Linden, Douglas and Cruise Streets". It is a mostly L-shaped district that includes the largest residential area in Corinth that was developed in the Antebellum area before the Civil War. The area developed from c. 1855 through c. 1941.

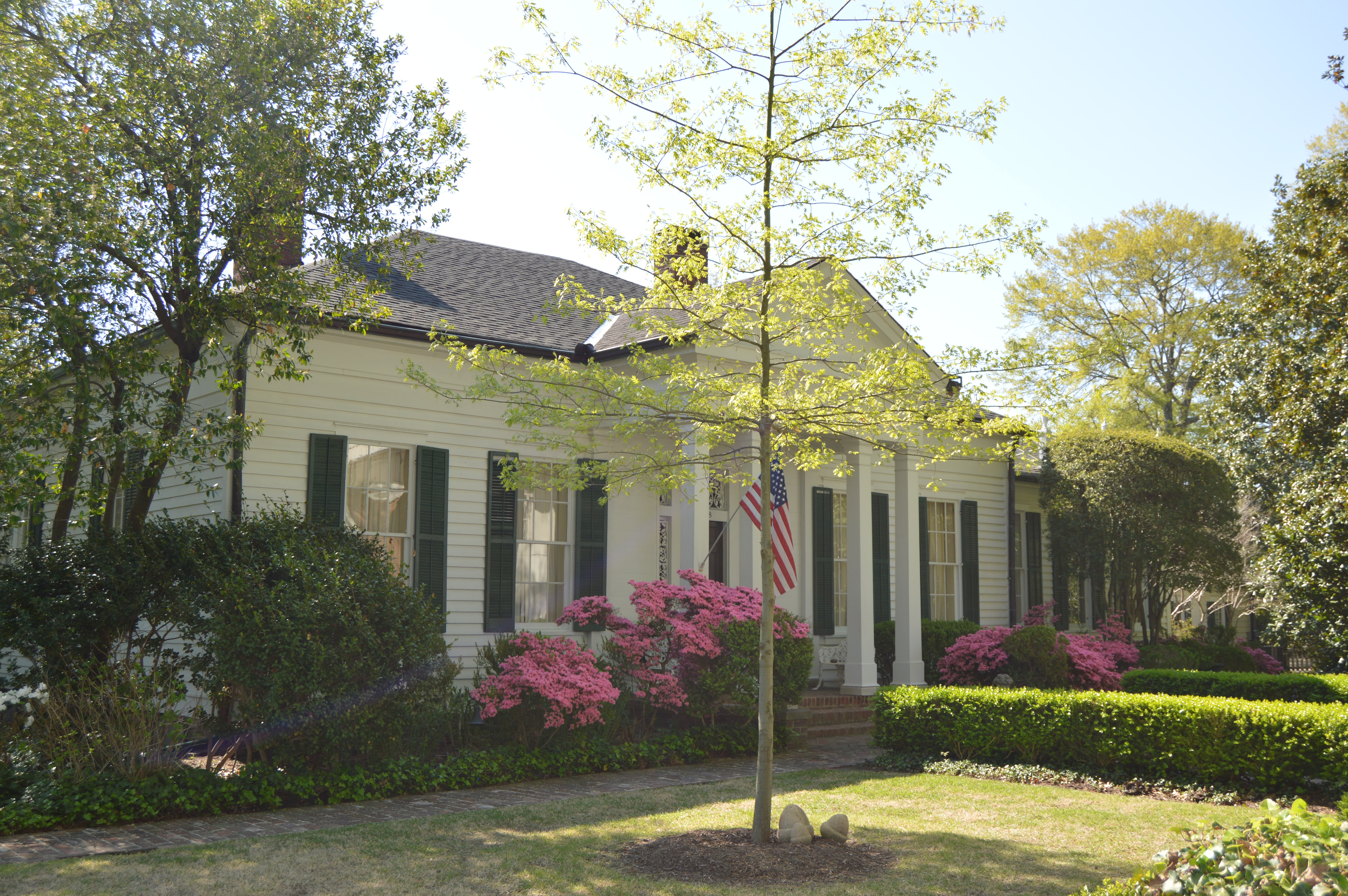
The Oak Home

Four buildings within the district were included within the 1991-designated Siege and Battle of Corinth Sites district, a National Historic Landmark. These are:

- Duncan House, 810 Polk Street,
- Oak Home, 808 North Fillmore Street, (Note: Listed as being at 808 North Fillmore at pages 22 and 63, listed as being at 808 Jackson Street at page 7.) which served as Leonidas Polk's headquarters during the Battle of Corinth. It is a one-story, post and timber center hall plan cottage with Greek Revival style, built c. 1857 and expanded c. 1930–35.
- Fish Pond House, 708 Kilpatrick Street, (#6 in accompanying photos), also a one-story, post and timber center hall plan cottage with Greek Revival style, built c. 1857. It has a bullet-like trim motif added c. 1925-30 to its entablature.
- and Veranda House (a.k.a. "Curlee House"), 705 Jackson Street (#15 in photos).

Other notable buildings in the district include:

- Zachery House, 404 Douglas Street, c. 1905–10, a one-story cottage with elements of Colonial Revival and Queen Anne styles, built ca.

1905–10.

- Taylor House, 1022 North Fillmore Street, (#26 in photos), built c. 1870–75, a center-gable "T-plan cottage with Gothic Revival influence"
