= Veranda House =

Historic house in Mississippi, United States

- U.S. National Register of Historic Places
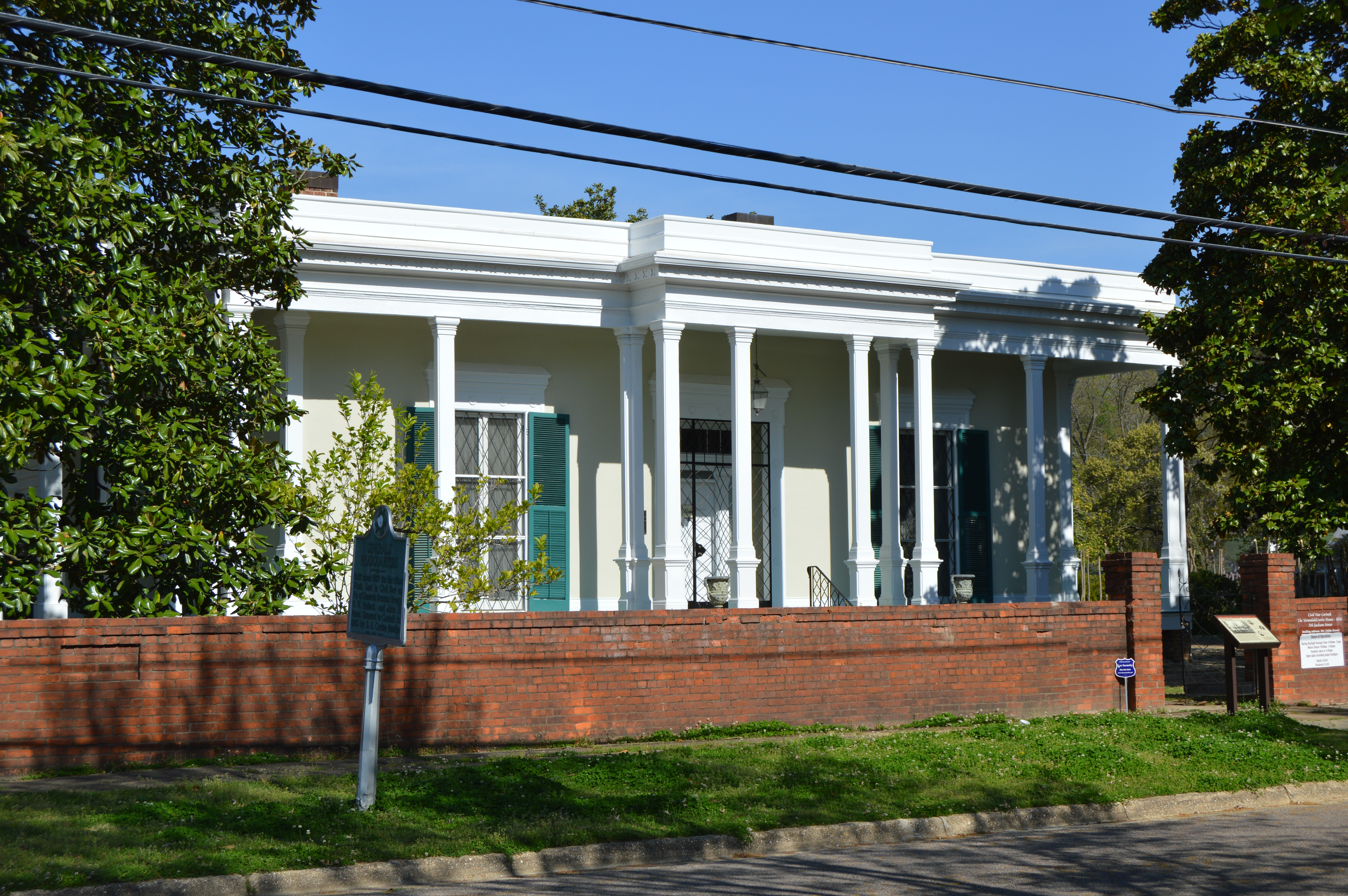
- The Veranda House in 2014

- Location within Mississippi Location within the United States
- Location: 711 Jackson Street, Corinth, Mississippi
- Coordinates: 34°56′13″N 88°31′16″W
- Area: 1 acre (0.40 ha)
- Built: 1857
- Architectural style: Gothic Revival
- NRHP reference No.: 75001038
- Added to NRHP: August 22, 1975

The Veranda House, also known as the Curlee House, is a historic house in Corinth, Mississippi, U.S..

== History ==
The house was built in 1857 for Hamilton Mask, a surveyor who went on to serve as the mayor of Corinth in 1866 and 1872. In 1860, it was sold to Burnett B. Wilkerson, who sold it to William Simonton shortly after. Simonton remained the property owner until 1872.

During the American Civil War of 1861–1865, General Braxton Bragg of the Confederate States Army stayed in the house, as did Confederate General Earl Van Dorn. Later, General Henry Halleck of the Union Army also stayed in the house.

The house was purchased by Judge William E. Curlee in 1875. His widow, Mary Boone Curlee, sold the house outside the family in 1882. By 1921, it was purchased by William Curlee's descendant, Shelby Hammond Curlee. In 1960–1963, the house was deeded to the Corinth Library Commission.

== Architectural significance ==
The house was designed in the Greek Revival architectural style. It has been listed on the National Register of Historic Places since August 22, 1975.
