= 1920 United States presidential election in Mississippi =

- November 2, 1920

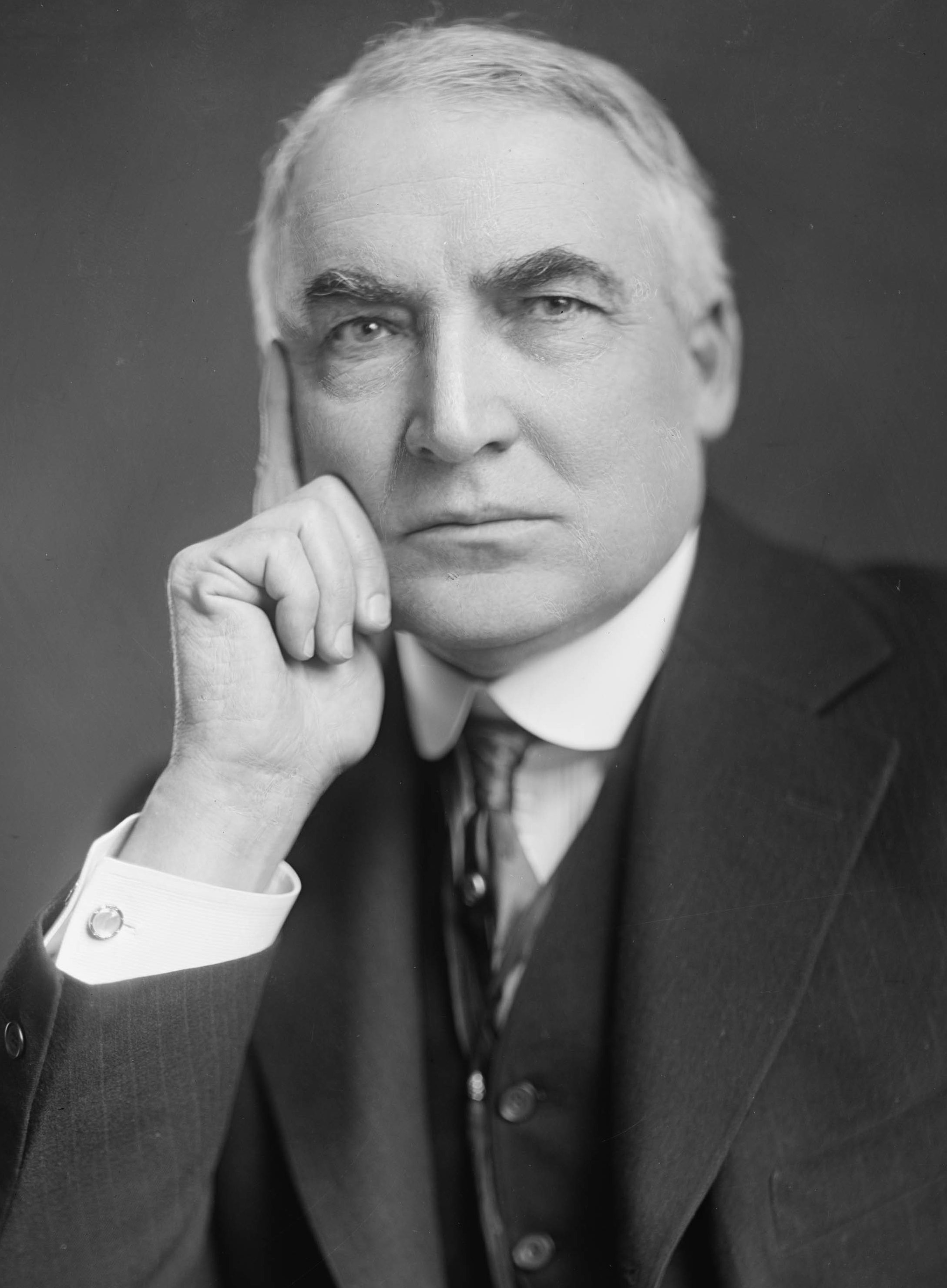
Nominee	James M. Cox	Warren G. Harding
Party	Democratic	Republican
Home state	Ohio	Ohio
Running mate	Franklin D. Roosevelt	Calvin Coolidge
Electoral vote	10	0
Popular vote	69,277	11,576
Percentage	83.98%	14.03%
County results
Cox
60–70%
70–80%
80–90%
90–100%
President before election
Woodrow Wilson
Democratic
Elected President
Warren G. Harding
Republican

The 1920 United States presidential election in Mississippi took place on November 2, 1920, as part of the 1920 United States presidential election which was held throughout all contemporary 48 states. Voters chose 10 representatives, or electors to the Electoral College, who voted for president and vice president. In Mississippi, voters voted for electors individually instead of as a slate, as in the other states.

Mississippi voted for the Democratic nominee, Governor James M. Cox of Ohio, over Republican nominee, Senator Warren G. Harding of Ohio. Cox ran with Assistant Secretary of the Navy Franklin D. Roosevelt of New York, while Harding ran with Governor Calvin Coolidge of Massachusetts.

Cox won Mississippi by a landslide margin of 69.95%.

== Results ==
General election results
Party	Pledged to	Elector	Votes
Democratic Party	James M. Cox	Henry Minor	69,277
Democratic Party	James M. Cox	R. H. Henry	69,252
Democratic Party	James M. Cox	Walker Wood	69,135
Democratic Party	James M. Cox	J. S. Savage	69,118
Democratic Party	James M. Cox	James Lee Byrd	69,107
Democratic Party	James M. Cox	J. E. Davis	69,107
Democratic Party	James M. Cox	Thomas E. Pegram	69,102
Democratic Party	James M. Cox	E. H. Reber	69,071
Democratic Party	James M. Cox	C. N. Harris Sr.	69,058
Democratic Party	James M. Cox	F. D. Mellen	69,025
Republican Party	Warren G. Harding	J. Jay White	11,576
Republican Party	Warren G. Harding	J. A. DeMonbrun	11,546
Republican Party	Warren G. Harding	E. W. DuBoise	11,527
Republican Party	Warren G. Harding	H. A. Moore	11,527
Republican Party	Warren G. Harding	C. H. Thomas	11,522
Republican Party	Warren G. Harding	Percy Matthews	11,513
Republican Party	Warren G. Harding	G. M. Flynn	11,506
Republican Party	Warren G. Harding	H. M. Ward	11,505
Republican Party	Warren G. Harding	S. T. Walls	11,489
Republican Party	Warren G. Harding	T. A. Helgason	11,465
Socialist Party of America	Eugene V. Debs	J. T. Lester	1,639
Socialist Party of America	Eugene V. Debs	G. W. Powell	1,604
Socialist Party of America	Eugene V. Debs	J. W. Moore	1,602
Socialist Party of America	Eugene V. Debs	William Davis	1,594
Socialist Party of America	Eugene V. Debs	W. T. Roberts	1,588
Socialist Party of America	Eugene V. Debs	John G. Adams Jr.	1,582
Socialist Party of America	Eugene V. Debs	C. W. Smith	1,580
Socialist Party of America	Eugene V. Debs	J. M. Speed	1,576
Socialist Party of America	Eugene V. Debs	W. C. Kennedy	1,575
Socialist Party of America	Eugene V. Debs	S. P. Redmond	1,565
Total votes			82,492
