= Hinkle, Mississippi =

- Unincorporated community
- Location within Mississippi Location within the United States
- Coordinates: 34°46′45″N 88°37′15″W
- Country: United States
- State: Mississippi
- County: Alcorn
- Elevation: 486 ft (148 m)

Population
  - Total: 5,314
- Time zone: UTC-6 (Central (CST))
  - Summer (DST): UTC-5 (CDT)
- Area code: 662
- GNIS feature ID: 683148

Hinkle is an unincorporated community in Alcorn County, Mississippi, United States.

== History ==
Hinkle is named after a local family. A post office operated under the name Hinkle from 1881 to 1903.
