= Tuscumbia River =

Coordinates: 35.0014773°N 88.7389424°W

Location
- Country: United States
- States: Mississippi and Tennessee

Physical characteristics
- Source
  - location: Prentiss County, Mississippi
  - elevation: 361 ft (110 m)
- Mouth
  - location: Hatchie River
- Length: 44.4 mi (71.5 km)

The Tuscumbia River is a 44.4-mile-long (71.5 km) tributary of the Hatchie River in northern Mississippi and western Tennessee in the United States. It rises in Prentiss County, Mississippi, near Booneville. It flows through Alcorn County, then into McNairy County, Tennessee, where it is joined by a major tributary, Cypress Creek, and then flows into the Hatchie River, just before it reaches Hardeman County, near Pocahontas, Tennessee.

Tuscumbia is a name derived from the Chickasaw language purported to mean either "warrior killer" or "warrior rainmaker".

== See also ==
- List of rivers of Mississippi
- List of rivers of Tennessee
