= Ramer, Tennessee =

City in McNairy County, Tennessee, United States

- City
- Location of Ramer in McNairy County, Tennessee.
- Coordinates: 35°4′13″N 88°36′57″W
- Country: United States
- State: Tennessee
- County: McNairy

Area
  - Total: 1.79 sq mi (4.64 km^{2})
  - Land: 1.79 sq mi (4.64 km^{2})
  - Water: 0 sq mi (0.00 km^{2})
- Elevation: 410 ft (125 m)

Population (2020)
  - Total: 325
  - Density: 181.5/sq mi (70.07/km^{2})
- Time zone: UTC-6 (Central (CST))
  - Summer (DST): UTC-5 (CDT)
- ZIP code: 38367
- Area code: 731
- FIPS code: 47-61520
- GNIS feature ID: 1298872

Ramer is a city in McNairy County, Tennessee. As of the 2020 census, Ramer had a population of 325.

== History ==
The community was named after the Ramer family of settlers.

Ramer was founded as a stop along the Mobile and Ohio Railroad. The line was extended south through Ramer some time between January 1860 and April 22, 1861. A stop was built at Ramer by 1874.

== Geography ==
Ramer is located at 35°4′13″N 88°36′57″W (35.070243, -88.615851).

According to the United States Census Bureau, the city has a total area of 1.7 square miles (4.4 km^{2}), all land.

== Demographics ==
Historical population
Census	Pop.	Note	%±
1960	358		—
1970	347		−3.1%
1980	429		23.6%
1990	337		−21.4%
2000	354		5.0%
2010	319		−9.9%
2020	325		1.9%

=== 2020 census ===
As of the 2020 census, Ramer had a population of 325. The median age was 44.4 years.

21.5% of residents were under the age of 18 and 28.3% of residents were 65 years of age or older. For every 100 females there were 107.0 males, and for every 100 females age 18 and over there were 100.8 males age 18 and over.

0.0% of residents lived in urban areas, while 100.0% lived in rural areas.

There were 135 households in Ramer, of which 34.1% had children under the age of 18 living in them. Of all households, 55.6% were married-couple households, 18.5% were households with a male householder and no spouse or partner present, and 24.4% were households with a female householder and no spouse or partner present. About 31.9% of all households were made up of individuals and 15.5% had someone living alone who was 65 years of age or older.

There were 158 housing units, of which 14.6% were vacant. The homeowner vacancy rate was 1.7% and the rental vacancy rate was 4.3%.

Racial composition as of the 2020 census
Race	Number	Percent
White	297	91.4%
Black or African American	21	6.5%
American Indian and Alaska Native	4	1.2%
Asian	0	0.0%
Native Hawaiian and Other Pacific Islander	0	0.0%
Some other race	0	0.0%
Two or more races	3	0.9%
Hispanic or Latino (of any race)	2	0.6%

=== 2000 census ===
As of the census of 2000, there was a population of 354, with 142 households and 102 families residing in the city. The population density was 206.8 inhabitants per square mile (79.8/km^{2}). There were 155 housing units at an average density of 90.6 per square mile (35.0/km^{2}). The racial makeup of the city was 87.29% White, 11.86% African American, and 0.85% from two or more races. Hispanic or Latino of any race were 3.39% of the population.

There were 142 households, out of which 28.9% had children under the age of 18 living with them, 58.5% were married couples living together, 10.6% had a female householder with no husband present, and 27.5% were non-families. 25.4% of all households were made up of individuals, and 12.0% had someone living alone who was 65 years of age or older. The average household size was 2.49 and the average family size was 2.94.

In the city, the population was spread out, with 26.0% under the age of 18, 8.5% from 18 to 24, 23.7% from 25 to 44, 28.0% from 45 to 64, and 13.8% who were 65 years of age or older. The median age was 36 years. For every 100 females, there were 97.8 males. For every 100 females age 18 and over, there were 95.5 males.

The median income for a household in the city was $27,292, and the median income for a family was $31,071. Males had a median income of $31,094 versus $18,125 for females. The per capita income for the city was $14,942. About 12.7% of families and 16.8% of the population were below the poverty line, including 28.4% of those under age 18 and 7.1% of those age 65 or over.
