= Pocahontas, Tennessee =

- Census-designated place
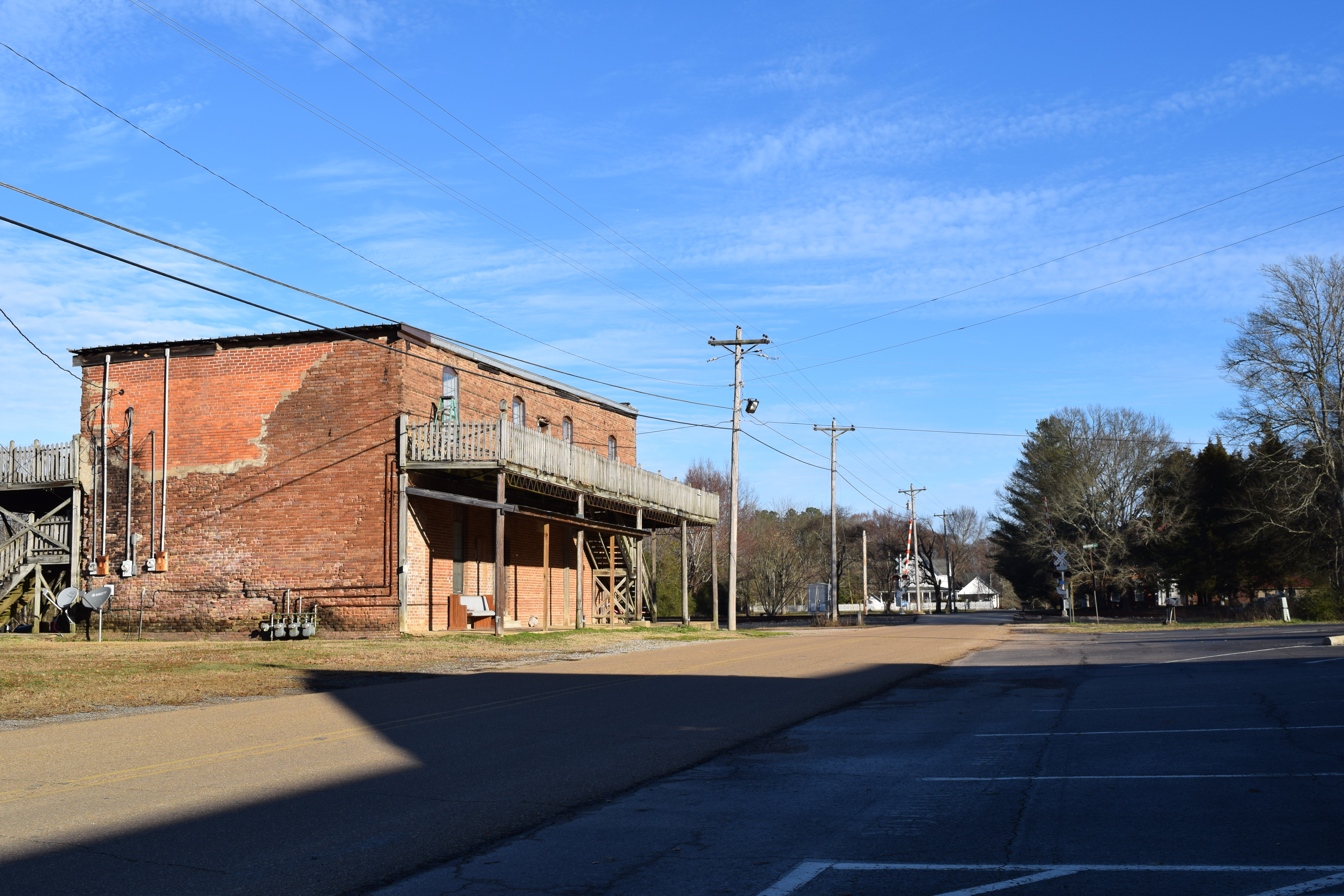

- Location within Tennessee Location within the United States
- Coordinates: 35°03′09″N 88°48′13″W
- Country: United States
- State: Tennessee
- County: Hardeman, McNairy

Area
  - Total: 2.05 sq mi (5.31 km^{2})
  - Land: 2.05 sq mi (5.31 km^{2})
  - Water: 0 sq mi (0.00 km^{2})
- Elevation: 394 ft (120 m)

Population (2020)
  - Total: 176
  - Density: 85.8/sq mi (33.12/km^{2})
- Time zone: UTC-6 (Central (CST))
  - Summer (DST): UTC-5 (CDT)
- ZIP code: 38061
- Area code: 731
- GNIS feature ID: 1297992

Pocahontas is an unincorporated community and census-designated place (CDP) in Hardeman and McNairy counties, Tennessee, United States. It is eighty-three miles southeast of Memphis.

Pocahontas is a postal city with ZIP code 38061. Big Hill Pond State Park is nearby.

== Demographics ==
As of the 2024 American Community Survey 5-Year Estimates, Pocahontas has an estimated population of 391.

Historical population
Census	Pop.	Note	%±
2020	176		—
U.S. Decennial Census

== History ==
The community originated in 1828 as a settlement known as Ray's Bluff, located at the confluence of the Hatchie and Tuscumbia Rivers. After a stagecoach line began service in the region, the settlers moved their village to a site on the stage route, on Matamora Hill. A large hotel and several homes were built in Matamora before 1845. In 1848, the community moved to its present site, to locate along the new Memphis and Charleston Railroad line, which crossed the area about 2 miles (3.2 km) north of Matamora Hill.

Pocahontas was the site of the Civil War Battle of Davis Bridge.
