= Rienzi, Mississippi =

- Town
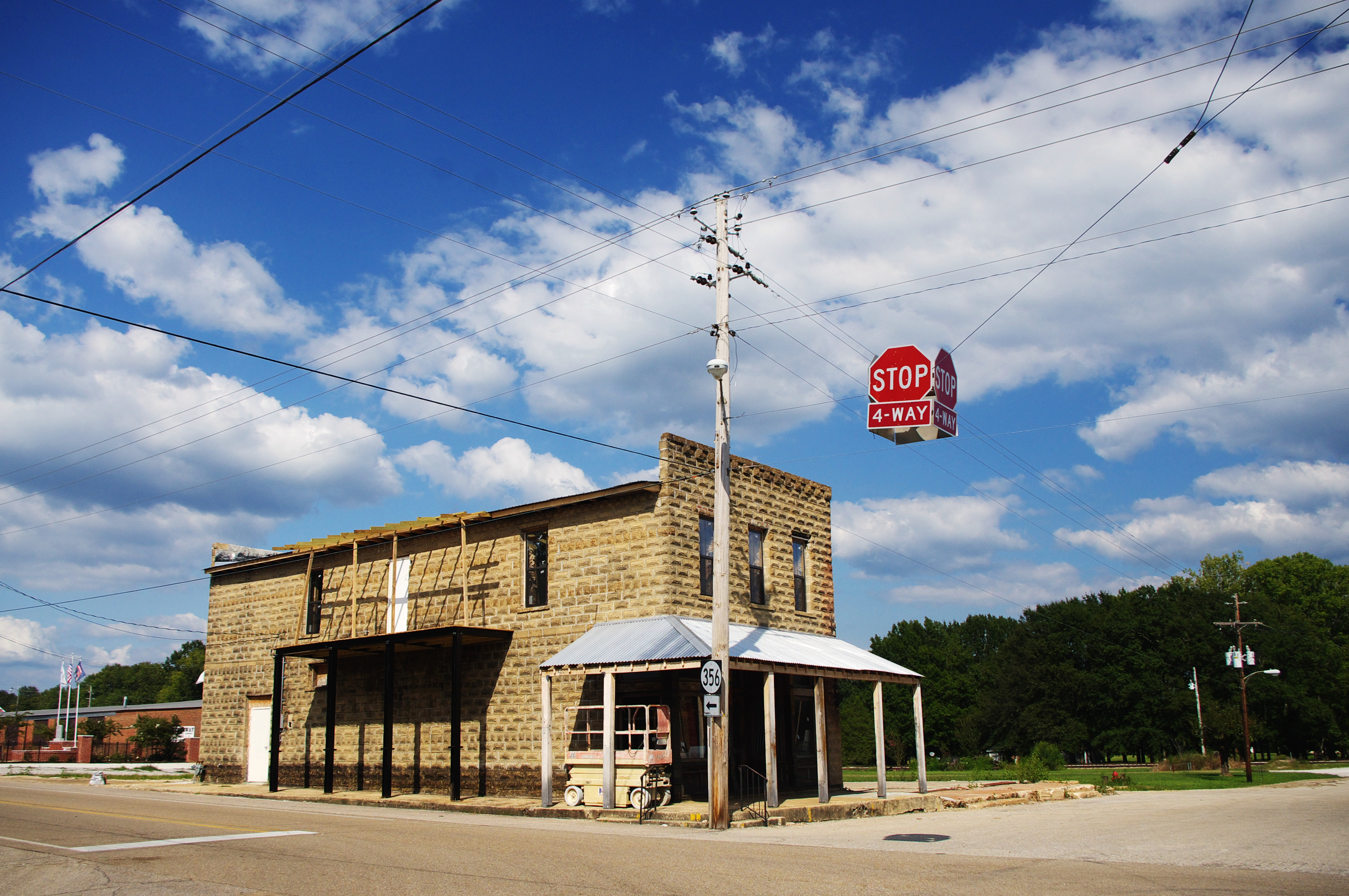
- Building at Main and Front
- Motto(s): "Small Town, Big Heart - Where History and Community Meet"
- Location of Rienzi, Mississippi

- Location in Mississippi Rienzi, Mississippi (the United States)
- Coordinates: 34°45′48″N 88°32′02″W
- Country: United States
- State: Mississippi
- County: Alcorn

Area
  - Total: 0.99 sq mi (2.57 km^{2})
  - Land: 0.99 sq mi (2.57 km^{2})
  - Water: 0 sq mi (0.00 km^{2})
- Elevation: 476 ft (145 m)

Population (2020)
  - Total: 281
  - Density: 283.7/sq mi (109.55/km^{2})
- Time zone: UTC-6 (Central (CST))
  - Summer (DST): UTC-5 (CDT)
- ZIP code: 38865
- Area code: 662
- FIPS code: 28-62560
- GNIS feature ID: 2407219
- Website: townofrienzi.org

Rienzi is a town in Alcorn County, Mississippi, United States. As of the 2020 census, Rienzi had a population of 281.

== History ==
Rienzi was named for Cola di Rienzo, a medieval Italian politician. The original town was settled in 1830 and was located one mile west of its current location, near the Nesly Williams Plantation.

== Geography ==
According to the United States Census Bureau, the town has a total area of 1.0 square mile (2.6 km^{2}), all land. The town is concentrated along Mississippi Highway 356 (signed as Main Street and Front Street), just east of the highway's intersection with U.S. Route 45, in southern Alcorn County. Corinth lies to the north, Booneville lies to the south, and Glen lies to the northeast.

== Demographics ==
Historical population
Census	Pop.	Note	%±
1900	230		—
1910	434		88.7%
1920	493		13.6%
1930	500		1.4%
1940	458		−8.4%
1950	468		2.2%
1960	375		−19.9%
1970	363		−3.2%
1980	423		16.5%
1990	339		−19.9%
2000	330		−2.7%
2010	317		−3.9%
2020	281		−11.4%
U.S. Decennial Census

As of the census of 2000, there were 330 people, 127 households, and 99 families residing in the town. The population density was 332.9 inhabitants per square mile (128.5/km^{2}). There were 147 housing units at an average density of 148.3 per square mile (57.3/km^{2}). The racial makeup of the town was 69.39% White, 28.48% African American, 2.12% from other races. Hispanic or Latino of any race were 3.64% of the population.

There were 127 households, out of which 26.0% had children under the age of 18 living with them, 56.7% were married couples living together, 16.5% had a female householder with no husband present, and 22.0% were non-families. 21.3% of all households were made up of individuals, and 14.2% had someone living alone who was 65 years of age or older. The average household size was 2.60 and the average family size was 3.04.

In the town, the population was distributed as follows: 25.2% were under the age of 18, 10.3% were aged 18 to 24, 24.8% were aged 25 to 44, 26.7% were aged 45 to 64, and 13.0% were 65 years of age or older. The median age was 39 years. There were 94.1 males for every 100 females, and for every 100 females age 18 and over, there were 77.7 males.

The median income for a household in the town was $26,563, and the median income for a family was $31,375. Males had a median income of $31,125 versus $20,625 for females. The per capita income for the town was $10,604. About 22.6% of families and 28.4% of the population were below the poverty line, including 36.7% of those under age 18 and 34.8% of those age 65 or over.

== Education ==
The town of Rienzi is served by the Alcorn School District.

== Notable people ==
- Lee Denson, rockabilly singer and songwriter
- Billy McCoy, politician
- Bill Michael, head football coach of the University of Texas at El Paso from 1977 to 1981.
