= Jacinto, Mississippi =

- Census-designated place
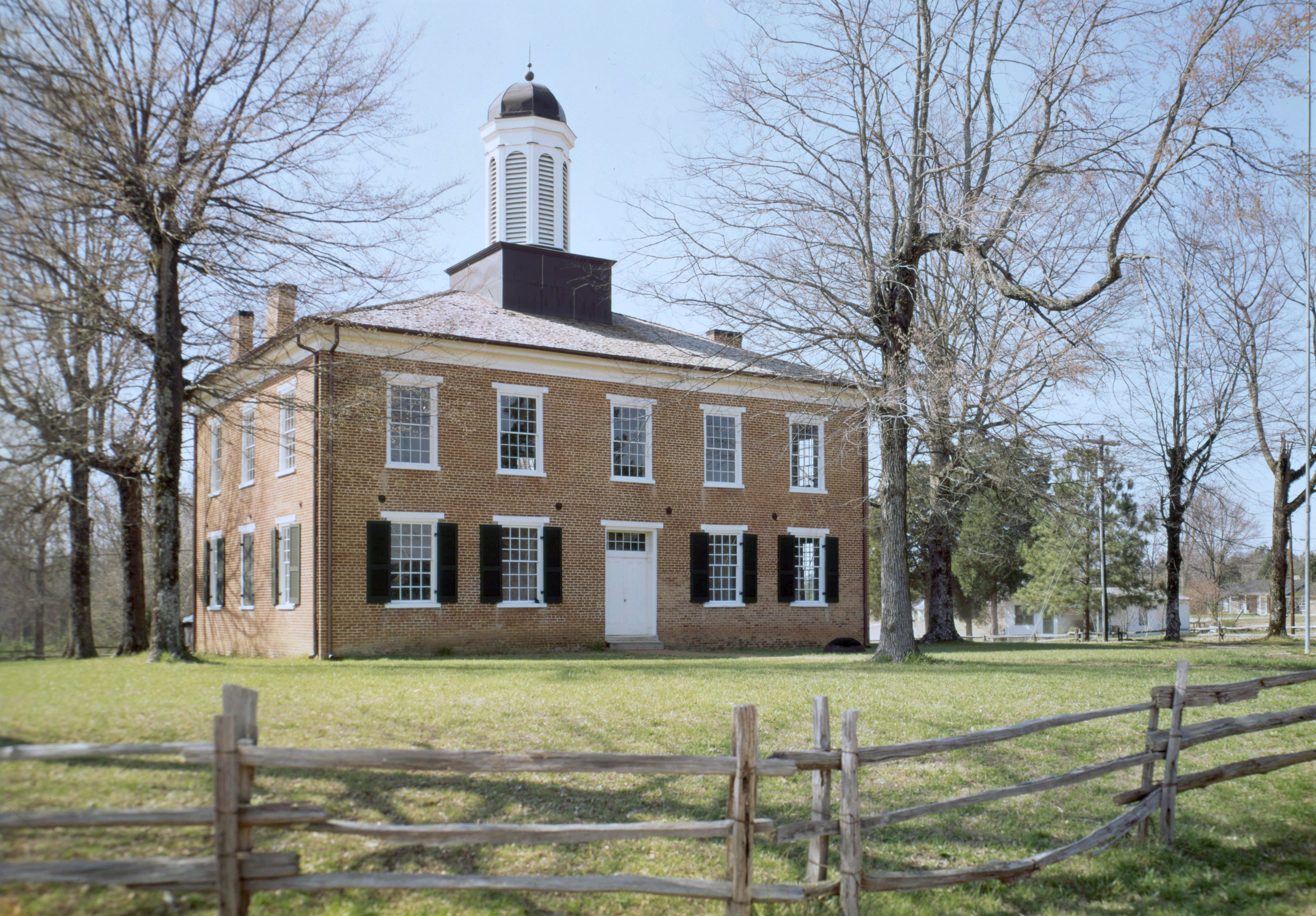
- Jacinto Courthouse. Photo by Jack Boucher, 1975.

- Location within the United States Location within Mississippi
- Coordinates: 34°45′44″N 88°25′39″W
- Country: United States
- State: Mississippi
- County: Alcorn

Area
  - Total: 0.87 sq mi (2.26 km^{2})
  - Land: 0.87 sq mi (2.26 km^{2})
  - Water: 0 sq mi (0.00 km^{2})
- Elevation: 545 ft (166 m)

Population (2020)
  - Total: 52
  - Density: 59.5/sq mi (22.99/km^{2})
- Time zone: UTC-6 (Central (CST))
  - Summer (DST): UTC-5 (CDT)
- FIPS code: 28-35340
- GNIS feature ID: 2812710

Jacinto is an unincorporated community in Alcorn County, Mississippi, in the United States. As of the 2020 census, Jacinto had a population of 52. It was founded in 1836, and was named after the Battle of San Jacinto in the Texas Revolution.

Jacinto was located in the geographic center of the original Tishomingo County, Mississippi. Within ten years of its founding, Jacinto became a flourishing town with stores, hotels, schools, churches and taverns, serving as the center of government and commerce for the county. It is the site of a courthouse built in 1854 in the federal style as the county courthouse for the original Tishomingo County. The courthouse has been refurbished and is listed in the National Register of Historic Places. It is open to visitors.

Per the 2020 Census, the population was 52.

== History ==
A skirmish occurred on September 7, 1863 in the vicinity of Jacinto between Confederate and Union Cavalry during the American Civil War.

In 1869, Tishomingo was divided into three counties: Tishomingo, Alcorn and Prentiss. Corinth became the county seat of newly established Alcorn County, Iuka of the reduced Tishomingo County, and Booneville of the new county of Prentiss. When the county seat was moved from Jacinto in 1870, the town's importance declined, and town residents and businesses began moving away.

A post office operated under the name Jacinto from 1840 to 1909.

== Demographics ==
Historical population
Census	Pop.	Note	%±
2020	52		—
U.S. Decennial Census; 2020

Jacinto was first listed as a census designated place in the 2020 U.S. census.

=== 2020 census ===
Jacinto CDP, Mississippi – Racial and ethnic composition Note: the US Census treats Hispanic/Latino as an ethnic category. This table excludes Latinos from the racial categories and assigns them to a separate category. Hispanics/Latinos may be of any race.
Race / Ethnicity (NH = Non-Hispanic)	Pop 2020	% 2020
White alone (NH)	49	94.23%
Black or African American alone (NH)	0	0.00%
Native American or Alaska Native alone (NH)	1	1.92%
Asian alone (NH)	0	0.00%
Native Hawaiian or Pacific Islander alone (NH)	0	0.00%
Other race alone (NH)	0	0.00%
Mixed race or Multiracial (NH)	1	1.92%
Hispanic or Latino (any race)	1	1.92%
Total	52	100.00%

== Gallery ==
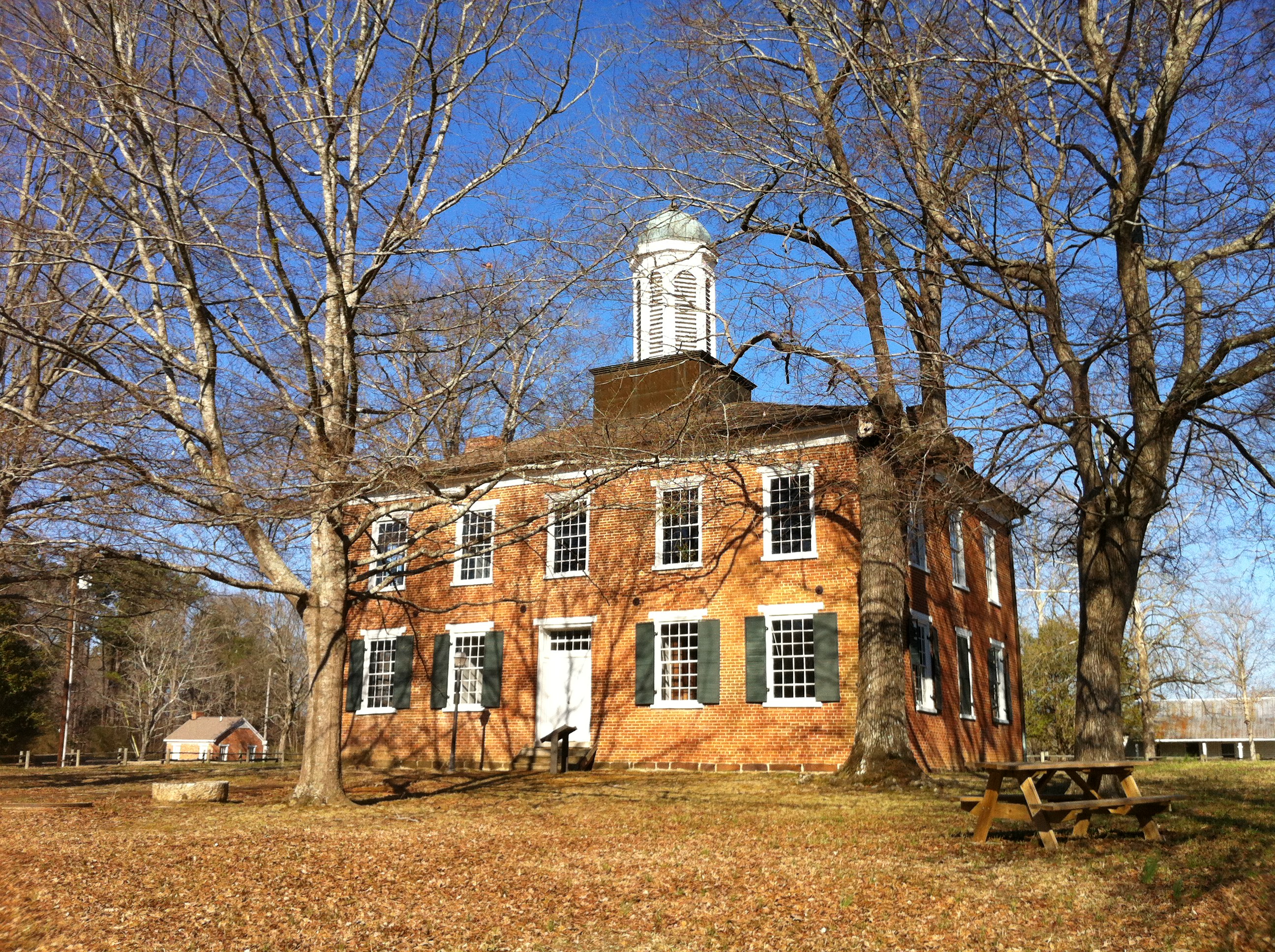
Western façade of the Old Tishomingo County courthouse in Jacinto, 2014

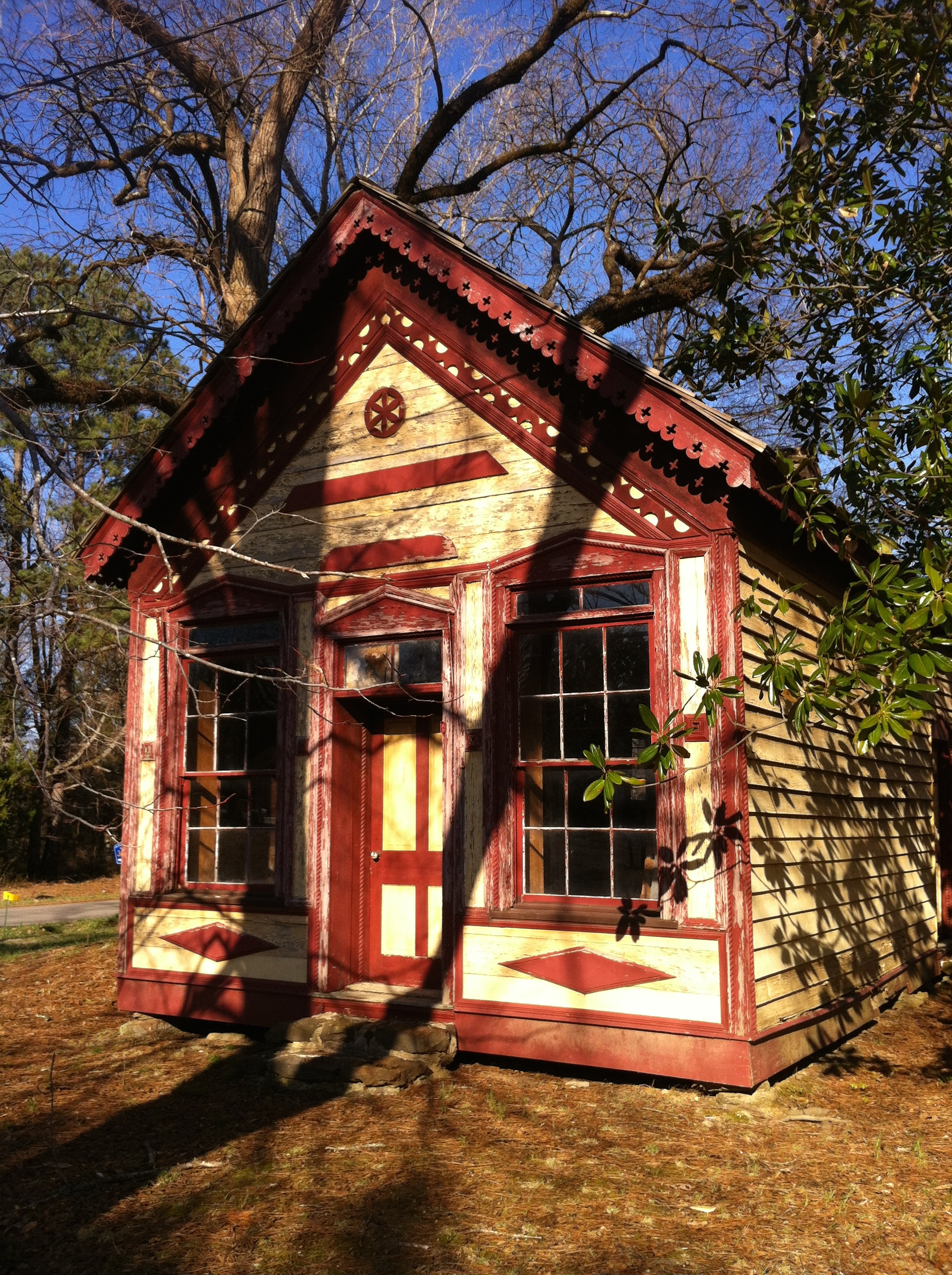
Doctor’s Office on the Old Tishomingo County courthouse square in Jacinto, 2014
