= Alcorn County, Mississippi =

County in Mississippi, United States

- County
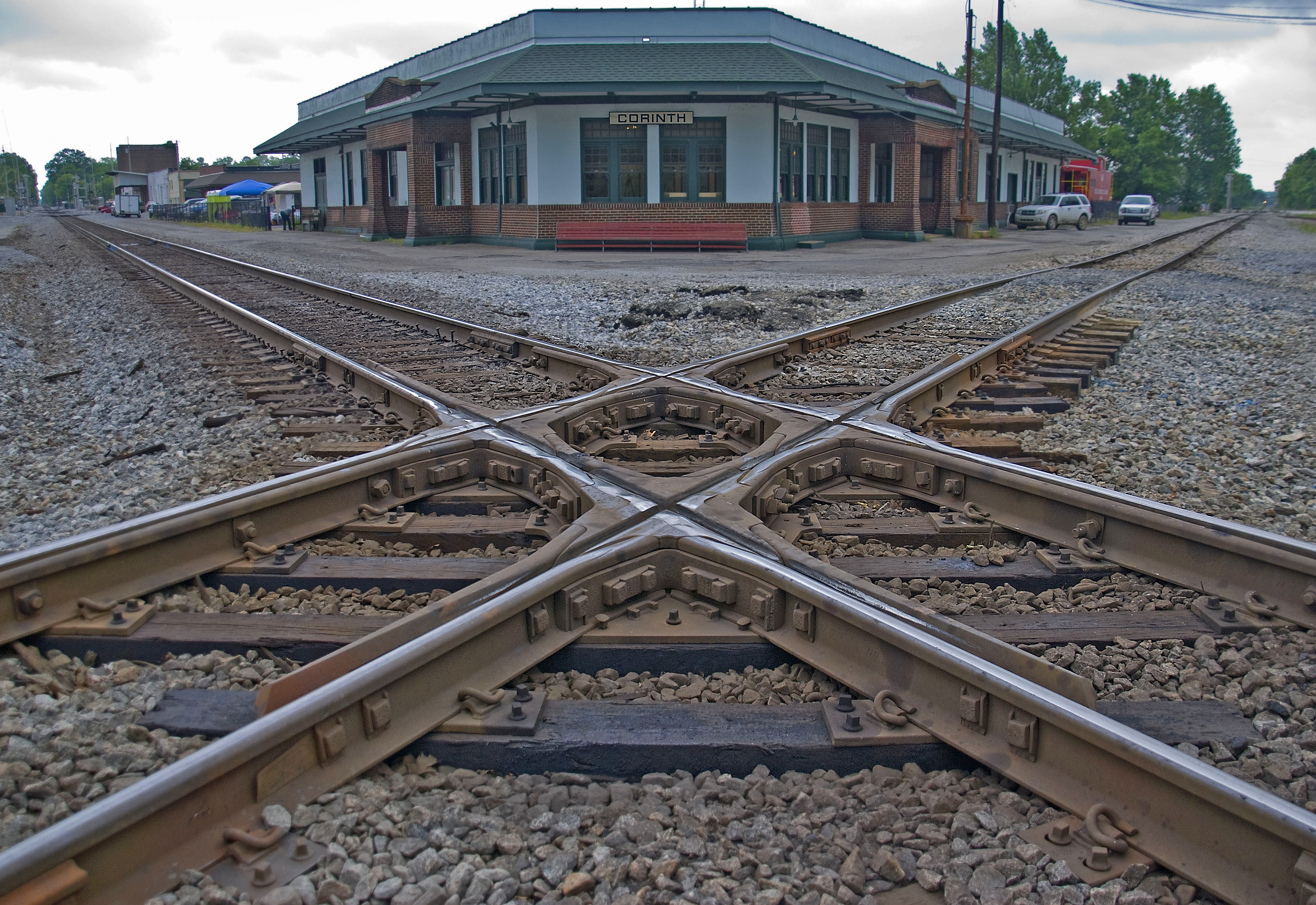
- The Crossroads Museum in Corinth

- Location within the U.S. state of Mississippi
- Country: United States
- State: Mississippi
- Established: April 15, 1870 (156 years ago)
- Named for: James L. Alcorn
- Seat: Corinth
- Largest city: Corinth

Area
  - Total: 401 sq mi (1,040 km^{2})
  - Land: 400 sq mi (1,000 km^{2})
  - Water: 1.3 sq mi (3.4 km^{2}) 0.3%

Population (2020)
  - Total: 34,740
  - Estimate (2025): 34,569 ▼
  - Density: 87/sq mi (34/km^{2})
- Time zone: UTC−6 (Central)
  - Summer (DST): UTC−5 (CDT)
- Congressional district: 1st
- Website: alcorncounty.org

Alcorn County is a county located in the northeastern portion of the U.S. state of Mississippi. As of the 2020 census, the population was 34,740. Its county seat is Corinth. The county is named in honor of Governor James L. Alcorn. The Corinth Micropolitan Statistical Area includes all of Alcorn County.

== History ==
Alcorn County was formed on April 15, 1870, from portions of Tippah and Tishomingo counties. It was the site of the Siege of Corinth, an early campaign in the American Civil War.

== Geography ==
According to the U.S. Census Bureau, the county has a total area of 401 square miles (1,040 km^{2}), of which 400 square miles (1,000 km^{2}) is land and 1.3 square miles (3.4 km^{2}) (0.3%) is water. It is the smallest county by area in Mississippi. The Tuscumbia and Hatchie rivers intersect the county.

=== Major highways ===
- U.S. Route 45
- U.S. Route 72
- Mississippi Highway 2

=== Adjacent counties ===
- McNairy County, Tennessee (north)
- Hardin County, Tennessee (northeast)
- Tishomingo County (east)
- Prentiss County (south)
- Tippah County (west)
- Hardeman County, Tennessee (northwest)

=== National protected area ===
- Shiloh National Military Park (part)

== Demographics ==
Historical population
Census	Pop.	Note	%±
1870	10,431		—
1880	14,272		36.8%
1890	13,115		−8.1%
1900	14,987		14.3%
1910	18,159		21.2%
1920	21,369		17.7%
1930	23,653		10.7%
1940	26,969		14.0%
1950	27,158		0.7%
1960	25,282		−6.9%
1970	27,179		7.5%
1980	33,036		21.5%
1990	31,722		−4.0%
2000	34,558		8.9%
2010	37,057		7.2%
2020	34,740		−6.3%
2025 (est.)	34,569	▼	−0.5%
U.S. Decennial Census; 1790-1960 1900-1990; 1990-2000 2010-2013

=== Racial and ethnic composition ===
Alcorn County, Mississippi – Racial and ethnic composition Note: the US Census treats Hispanic/Latino as an ethnic category. This table excludes Latinos from the racial categories and assigns them to a separate category. Hispanics/Latinos may be of any race.
Race / Ethnicity (NH = Non-Hispanic)	Pop 1980	Pop 1990	Pop 2000	Pop 2010	Pop 2020	% 1980	% 1990	% 2000	% 2010	% 2020
White alone (NH)	29,344	27,988	29,977	31,313	27,738	88.82%	88.23%	86.74%	84.50%	79.84%
Black or African American alone (NH)	3,425	3,529	3,814	4,209	4,316	10.37%	11.12%	11.04%	11.36%	12.42%
Native American or Alaska Native alone (NH)	20	22	33	62	61	0.06%	0.07%	0.10%	0.17%	0.18%
Asian alone (NH)	84	51	72	116	180	0.25%	0.16%	0.21%	0.31%	0.52%
Native Hawaiian or Pacific Islander alone (NH)	x	x	13	5	19	x	x	0.04%	0.01%	0.05%
Other race alone (NH)	0	5	21	28	50	0.00%	0.02%	0.06%	0.08%	0.14%
Mixed race or Multiracial (NH)	x	x	185	314	1,128	x	x	0.54%	0.85%	3.25%
Hispanic or Latino (any race)	163	127	443	1,010	1,248	0.49%	0.40%	1.28%	2.73%	3.59%
Total	33,036	31,722	34,558	37,057	34,740	100.00%	100.00%	100.00%	100.00%	100.00%

=== 2020 census ===
As of the 2020 census, the county had a population of 34,740. The median age was 41.3 years. 22.7% of residents were under the age of 18 and 19.6% of residents were 65 years of age or older. For every 100 females there were 94.3 males, and for every 100 females age 18 and over there were 91.9 males age 18 and over.

The racial makeup of the county was 80.6% White, 12.5% Black or African American, 0.3% American Indian and Alaska Native, 0.5% Asian, 0.1% Native Hawaiian and Pacific Islander, 2.1% from some other race, and 4.0% from two or more races. Hispanic or Latino residents of any race comprised 3.6% of the population.

35.9% of residents lived in urban areas, while 64.1% lived in rural areas.

There were 14,395 households in the county, of which 29.5% had children under the age of 18 living in them. Of all households, 43.9% were married-couple households, 19.0% were households with a male householder and no spouse or partner present, and 31.7% were households with a female householder and no spouse or partner present. About 31.4% of all households were made up of individuals and 14.8% had someone living alone who was 65 years of age or older.

There were 16,159 housing units, of which 10.9% were vacant. Among occupied housing units, 66.8% were owner-occupied and 33.2% were renter-occupied. The homeowner vacancy rate was 1.3% and the rental vacancy rate was 9.0%.

=== 2000 census ===
As of the census of 2000, there were 34,558 people, 14,224 households, and 9,914 families residing in the county. The population density was 86 people per square mile (33 people/km^{2}). There were 15,818 housing units at an average density of 40 units per square mile (15 units/km^{2}). The racial makeup of the county was 87.37% White, 11.07% Black or African American, 0.10% Native American, 0.21% Asian, 0.06% Pacific Islander, 0.59% from other races, and 0.60% from two or more races. 1.28% of the population were Hispanic or Latino of any race.

There were 14,224 households, out of which 30.90% had children under the age of 18 living with them, 54.50% were married couples living together, 11.50% had a female householder with no husband present, and 30.30% were non-families. 27.60% of all households were made up of individuals, and 11.90% had someone living alone who was 65 years of age or older. The average household size was 2.39 and the average family size was 2.91.

In the county, the population was spread out, with 23.90% under the age of 18, 9.10% from 18 to 24, 27.90% from 25 to 44, 24.40% from 45 to 64, and 14.80% who were 65 years of age or older. The median age was 38 years. For every 100 females there were 93.90 males. For every 100 females age 18 and over, there were 89.60 males.

The median income for a household in the county was $29,041, and the median income for a family was $36,899. Males had a median income of $29,752 versus $20,583 for females. The per capita income for the county was $15,418. About 13.10% of families and 16.60% of the population were below the poverty line, including 18.60% of those under age 18 and 22.60% of those age 65 or over.

== Politics ==
United States presidential election results for Alcorn County, Mississippi
Year	Republican		Democratic		Third party(ies)	
Year	No.	%	No.	%	No.	%
1912	40	3.59%	1,010	90.75%	63	5.66%
1916	125	7.87%	1,452	91.38%	12	0.76%
1920	354	20.45%	1,336	77.18%	41	2.37%
1924	223	10.86%	1,828	89.04%	2	0.10%
1928	335	17.95%	1,531	82.05%	0	0.00%
1932	73	2.87%	2,461	96.74%	10	0.39%
1936	53	2.16%	2,396	97.52%	8	0.33%
1940	133	4.34%	2,934	95.63%	1	0.03%
1944	206	7.17%	2,669	92.83%	0	0.00%
1948	91	2.94%	1,013	32.77%	1,987	64.28%
1952	1,155	26.07%	3,275	73.93%	0	0.00%
1956	827	20.31%	3,143	77.19%	102	2.50%
1960	820	18.32%	3,054	68.25%	601	13.43%
1964	3,377	63.79%	1,917	36.21%	0	0.00%
1968	1,760	19.16%	1,122	12.21%	6,304	68.63%
1972	5,732	83.28%	982	14.27%	169	2.46%
1976	3,430	31.85%	6,995	64.95%	345	3.20%
1980	5,196	41.25%	6,242	49.56%	1,157	9.19%
1984	7,203	58.66%	4,862	39.60%	214	1.74%
1988	6,641	54.88%	5,335	44.08%	126	1.04%
1992	6,249	44.21%	6,373	45.08%	1,514	10.71%
1996	4,960	45.25%	4,964	45.28%	1,038	9.47%
2000	7,254	57.40%	5,059	40.03%	325	2.57%
2004	8,634	60.64%	5,454	38.30%	151	1.06%
2008	10,805	71.17%	4,130	27.20%	247	1.63%
2012	11,111	74.92%	3,511	23.67%	208	1.40%
2016	11,819	79.95%	2,684	18.16%	280	1.89%
2020	12,818	81.16%	2,782	17.62%	193	1.22%
2024	12,657	83.75%	2,328	15.40%	127	0.84%

A Democratic stronghold turned swing county for the second half of the 20th Century, Alcorn County has, since the turn of the century, swung heavily into the Republican column. Its Republican tilt has increased in every election after 1996.

Lester Carpenter, member of the Mississippi House of Representatives representing the First District of Mississippi, which includes part of Alcorn and Tishomingo counties. Nick Bain represents the 2nd House District which is exclusively in Alcorn County.

== Communities ==
=== City ===
- Corinth (county seat and largest municipality)

=== Towns ===
- Farmington
- Glen
- Rienzi

=== Village ===
- Kossuth

=== Census-designated places ===
- Biggersville
- Jacinto

=== Unincorporated places ===
- Hinkle
- Kendrick
- Theo
- Wenasoga

=== Ghost towns ===
- Boneyard
- Danville

== Education ==
The vast majority of the county is in the Alcorn School District, but some portions, including all of the city of Corinth, are in the Corinth School District.

Northeast Mississippi Community College is the community college for Alcorn County.

== See also ==
- Dry counties
- National Register of Historic Places listings in Alcorn County, Mississippi
