= Isaac Guion =

American military officer and settler (1755–1823)

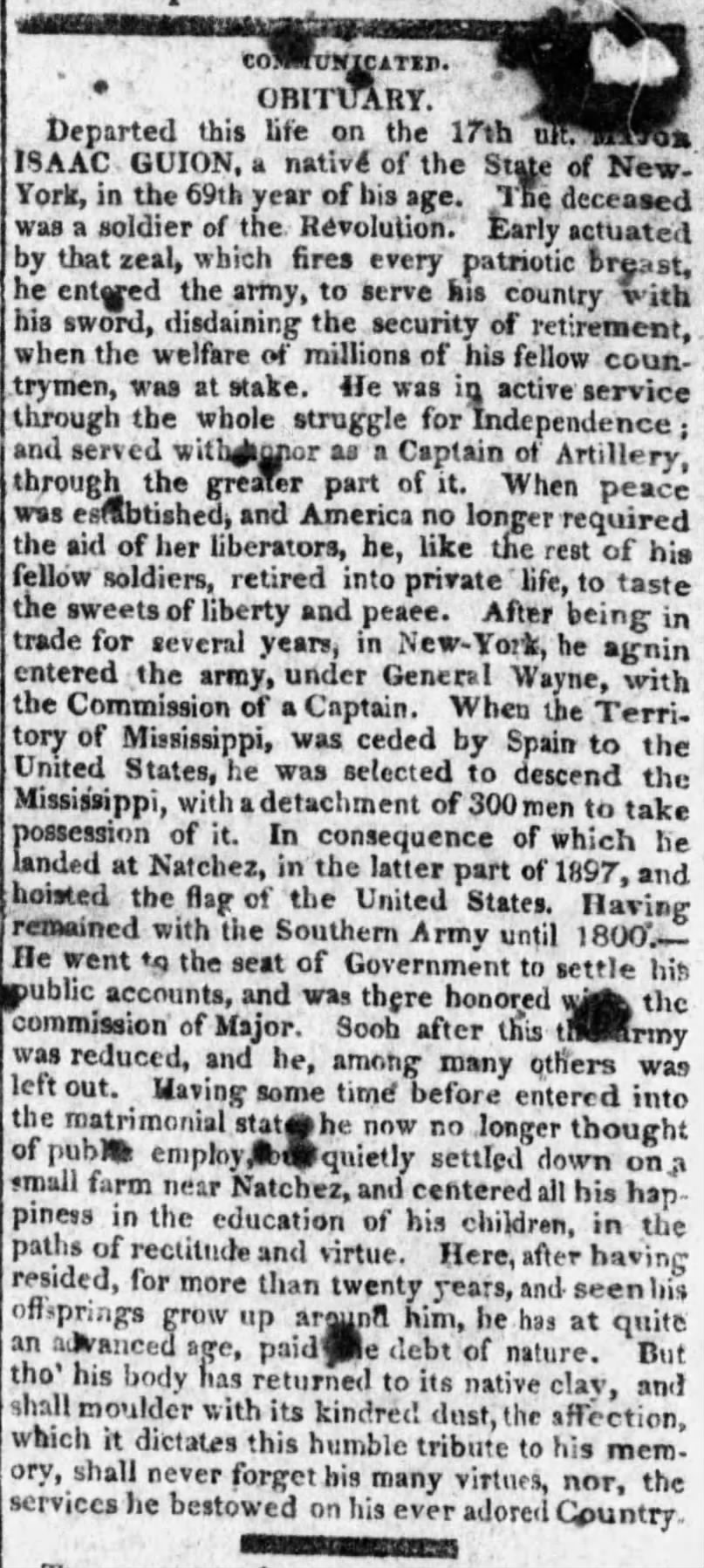
- Born: 1755; New Rochelle, New York
- Died: 1823 (aged 67–68); Natchez District, Mississippi

Isaac Guion (April 6, 1755 – September 7, 1823) was American military officer, settler, and cotton plantation owner. Born in New York, he served as in the American Revolutionary War and then in the regular army. After securing the Natchez District on behalf of the War Department, he settled there and ran a cotton plantation. Two of his sons became notable lawyers and public officials in Louisiana and Mississippi. Two of his sons attended the United States Military Academy at West Point, one of whom was expelled for his participation in the 1826 cadet riot, and one of whom was killed in a duel shortly after graduation.

== Biography ==
Guion was said to be the son of a Huguenot who left France and settled in New York. Guion was a lieutenant in the Continental Army during the American Revolutionary War, when he was on the staff of Alexander Hamilton. Guion was subsequently an officer under Gen. Anthony Wayne in his Indian campaigns. He was commissioned in the regular army after the war and supervised the official transfer of the Natchez District from Spanish military control to the United States in 1797, replacing "Crazy" Piercy Pope. In 1798 an Army officer named Richard Butler (who was both the son of William Butler, one of the five Fighting Butlers of the American Revolutionary War, and an associate of future president Andrew Jackson) traveled the Ohio and Mississippi to deliver dispatches to Guion. He settled in Adams County, Mississippi and lived near Half-Way Hill, so-called because it stood near the midpoint on the road between Natchez and Second Creek. As of 1806 he owned 300 acres in Jefferson County, Mississippi. His farm produced cotton, and supported "horses, black cattle, and hogs."

Guion was represented by Seth Lewis in two legal matters in the 1800s. In the first, Guion charged Simeon Hook with trespass, and in the second, Guion sued Hook for libel. According to a history of libel suits in 19th-century Mississippi:

Hook had accused Guion of larceny in front of other citizens of the territory and Guion claimed injury to his reputation, asking $4,000 in damages. The jury found for Guion and awarded him $50 plus court costs. In the Guion case, the language of the declaration was similar to the previous cases in the territory. The plaintiff was said to be an honorable citizen "since his nativity" and the slanderous spoken words were "scandalous, opprobrious, and malicious English words." The spoken words alleged great injury to his reputation and to have disgraced him among the citizens of the territory. No laws or prior cases were mentioned in support of the lawsuit.

When Aaron Burr was arrested at the house of Peter Bryan Bruin at Bayou Pierre for what was alleged to be the Burr conspiracy, he was held over as a guest of "Col. Benajah Osmun, a wealthy planter residing in the vicinity. He had been an officer in the New Jersey line, and intimate with Burr. In politics he was a high-strung federalist, had been a strong partisan of John Adams, and had no confidence in Mr. Jefferson. Near by Colonel Osmun, another old military friend of similar political opinions, the veteran Maj. Isaac Guion, and with these two, and other influential gentlemen, he had daily consultations. No sterner and truer patriots lived than these two veteran soldiers, and they reposed unshaken faith in the friend whom they had seen so often tested in the time that tried men's souls; Colonel Osmun lived at the place now owned by Dr. Stanton, and Major Guion resided at the foot of the Half-way Hill, and there was a rural path between the two places trellised with vines and shaded by evergreens. This was Burr's daily resort." According to one account there were 65 "adherents" of Burr in the vicinity of Natchez (it is unclear if Guion was so categorized). Later historians report that Guion's reputation "suffered for a time" because of the Burr association, "however, while there were rumors, there was no connection proved...The only proven connection between the two was that they fought together in the Revolutionary War."

In 1823 Guion was a candidate for the Mississippi State Senate from Adams County, along with Adam Bingaman. He died in September 1823, before the election. Despite being dead, he garnered 15 votes in the final tally. Prior to being dead, he may have served for a time as Surveyor and Inspector of Revenue for the port of Natchez.

== Personal life ==
Guion married Sarah Lewis, the sister of Seth Lewis, who served as Chief Justice of Mississippi Territory from 1800 to 1803, who himself married into the expansive Hardeman family. Lewis may have been born in the Floridas. Her father had been granted land in the Natchez District in the 1770s but died shortly after arrival. According to a Mississippian writing in 1883, "Both husband and wife were endowed with remarkable talents, and highly cultivated. Their sons inherited these gifts...John I. Guion, distinguished as lawyer and legislator, was partner of Wm. L. Sharkey and S. S. Prentiss. George W. Guion, parish Judge of Concordia, removed to Lafourche and became very prominent there."

- John Isaac Guion was a Mississippi Senate Senator and Governor of Mississippi
- Frederick Lewis Guion graduated West Point, class of 1823 (Cullum No. 323); killed in 1824 in a duel with W. W. Yerby, "a young lawyer of Woodville" (and the son of William Yerby)
- George S. Guion, Louisiana state senator, became a sugar planter at Thibodeauville, was godfather to Varina Howell Davis, wife of Jefferson Davis
- Walter Burling Guion also attended West Point, class of 1828, but was expelled for his involvement in the Cadet Riot of 1826; he was born at the family's Oak Hill plantation, studied at Jefferson College, and then went to West Point where he became one of Jeff Davis' best friends, later spending time at Brierfield. He became a civil engineer, never married, never held public office, died at Princeton, Mississippi, on October 23, 1845, at age 37.

== See also ==
- Burr conspiracy

== Sources ==
- Abernethy, Thomas Perkins (1949). "Aaron Burr in Mississippi". The Journal of Southern History. 15 (1): 9–21. doi:10.2307/2198070. ISSN 0022-4642. JSTOR 2198070.
- Claiborne, J. F. H.; Lagrone, C. M. (1880). Mississippi, as a Province, Territory and State, with Biographical Notices of Eminent Citizens. Jackson, Mississippi: Power & Barksdale. OCLC 68181845. OL 7795030W.
- Everton, Muriel (May 1, 2010). Libel in Mississippi, 1798–1832 (Ph.D. thesis). 949 – via University of Southern Mississippi.
