= McIntosh, Alabama =

- Town
- Andrews Chapel in McIntosh

- Location of McIntosh in Washington County, Alabama.
- Coordinates: 31°15′54″N 88°01′42″W
- Country: United States
- State: Alabama
- County: Washington

Area
  - Total: 1.00 sq mi (2.58 km^{2})
  - Land: 1.00 sq mi (2.58 km^{2})
  - Water: 0 sq mi (0.00 km^{2})
- Elevation: 49 ft (15 m)

Population (2020)
  - Total: 206
  - Density: 206.8/sq mi (79.85/km^{2})
- Time zone: UTC-6 (Central Time (CT))
  - Summer (DST): UTC-5 (CDT)
- ZIP code: 36553
- Area code: 251
- FIPS code: 01-45472
- GNIS feature ID: 2406131
- Website: mcintoshal.com

McIntosh (originally known as McIntosh Bluff) is a town located in Washington County, Alabama, United States along U.S. Route 43. It is 12 1/2 miles (20.1 km) south of Wagarville and 44 miles (71 km) north of Mobile. As of the 2020 census, McIntosh had a population of 206.

McIntosh is one of the most Native American towns in Alabama, with over half of the town's inhabitants reporting to be of Native descent in the 2020 census.

The town and county have a high proportion of residents who are members of the MOWA Band of Choctaw Indians, a state-recognized tribe. It has one site, Andrews Chapel, listed on the National Register of Historic Places.

== History ==
McIntosh was named for Captain John McIntosh, a British Army officer. McIntosh had a river landing at McIntosh Bluff on the Tombigbee River. The town was incorporated on April 7, 1970. McIntosh is near the site of Aaron Burr's arrest in 1807 while the area was part of the Mississippi Territory. He was captured by U.S. Army Lt. Edmund P. Gaines in the town of Wakefield, a few miles to the north, and then confined to Fort Stoddert. A historic marker has been placed to document this event.

== Geography ==
According to the U.S. Census Bureau, the town has a total area of 1.0 square mile (2.6 km^{2}), all land.

== Demographics ==
Historical population
Census	Pop.	Note	%±
1970	297		—
1980	319		7.4%
1990	250		−21.6%
2000	244		−2.4%
2010	238		−2.5%
2020	206		−13.4%
U.S. Decennial Census; 2013 Estimate

As of the census of 2000, there were 244 people, 94 households and 62 families in the town. The population density was 243.9 inhabitants per square mile (94.2/km^{2}). There were 98 housing units at an average density of 98.0 per square mile (37.8/km^{2}). The racial makeup of the town was 55.23% Native American, 43.03% Black or African American, 1.33% White and 0.41% from two or more races. 0,41% of the population were Hispanic or Latino of any race.

There were 94 households, out of which 36.2% had children under the age of 18 living with them, 47.9% were married couples living together, 18.1% had a female householder with no husband present, and 33.0% were non-families. 30.9% of all households were made up of individuals, and 11.7% had someone living alone who was 65 years of age or older. The average household size was 2.60 and the average family size was 3.27.

In the town, the population was spread out, with 29.5% under the age of 18, 6.6% from 18 to 24, 24.6% from 25 to 44, 25.0% from 45 to 64, and 14.3% who were 65 years of age or older. The median age was 35 years. For every 100 females, there were 83.5 males. For every 100 females age 18 and over, there were 72.0 males.

The median income for a household in the town was $28,214, and the median income for a family was $39,167. Males had a median income of $31,429 versus $22,750 for females. The per capita income for the town was $14,023. 13.5% of the population and 10.0% of families were below the poverty line. Out of the total population, 22.2% of those under the age of 18 and 9.1% of those 65 and older were living below the poverty line.

== Notable people ==
- George Troup, U.S. Senator and governor of Georgia
- Brok Weaver, mixed martial artist
- Greg Wells, former Major League Baseball player
