= Eggnog riot =

1826 cadet riot at the United States Military Academy

The eggnog riot, sometimes known as the grog mutiny or the Christmas 1826 cadet mutiny, was a riot that took place at the United States Military Academy in West Point, New York, on 24–25 December 1826. It was caused by a drunken Christmas party in the North Barracks of the academy. Two days prior to the incident, a large quantity of whiskey was smuggled into the academy to make eggnog for the party, giving the riot its name. As described by Albert E. Church, who was absent on Christmas leave and missed the happenings but later became a math professor at the academy, "A large number of the cadets got on a spree, and became excessively riotous, setting all officers at defiance and even, with a drawn sword, chasing one to his room-throwing missiles through the halls, breaking windows and the railings of the stairs, &c. The scene, as described to me two days afterwards, was fit for Bedlam."

The riot eventually involved more than one-third of the cadets by the time it ceased on Christmas morning. A subsequent investigation by academy officials resulted in the implication of 70 cadets and the court-martialing of 20 of them along with one enlisted soldier. Among the participants in the riot—though he was not court-martialed—was future Confederate States president Jefferson Davis.

== Background ==
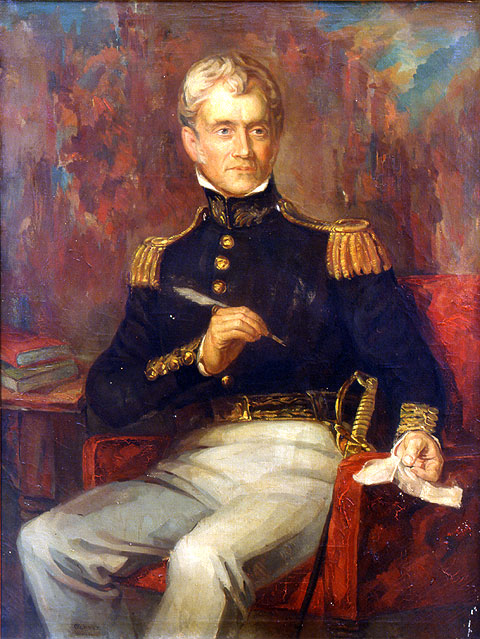
Painting of U.S. Military Academy superintendent Sylvanus Thayer by Robert Walter Weir

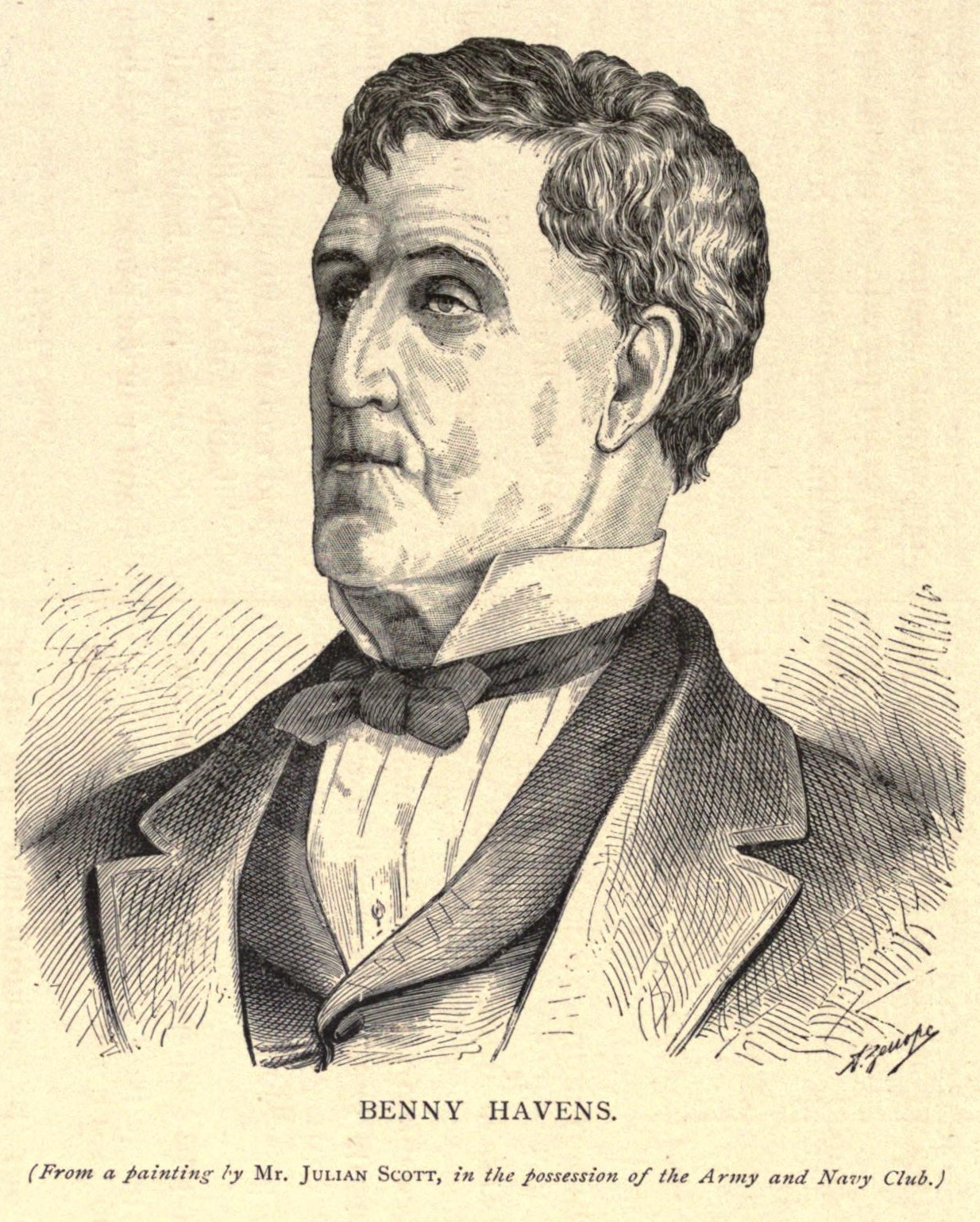
Tavern owner Benny Havens

The large number of small dairy farms in America in the early 19th century made milk, cream, and eggnog more accessible to the American public. George Washington drank eggnog that contained not only rum, but also significant amounts of sherry, brandy, and whiskey.

In 1817, Sylvanus Thayer took command at the United States Military Academy. By 1826, the academy had 36 men serving as faculty and staff with four recognized departments – mathematics, engineering, natural philosophy (now physics, chemistry, and life sciences), and military tactics.

Alcohol possession at the academy was prohibited along with drunkenness and intoxication, both of which could lead to expulsion. Tobacco use and gambling could lead to demerits, minor incarceration, or a loss of privileges. By 1826, concern had been raised that drinking was starting to get out of hand among the 260 cadets at the academy. The cadets were informed that, due to the alcohol prohibition on the site, their Christmas eggnog would be alcohol-free, prompting the decision to smuggle liquor into the academy.

== Timeline of events ==
=== 22 December 1826 ===
==== 20:50–22:15 ====
At Martin's Tavern, cadets William R. Burnley (Alabama), Alexander J. Center (New York), and Samuel Alexander Roberts (Alabama) almost got into a fight with the proprietors of another tavern concerning getting whiskey back to West Point. Private James Dougan, the duty security guard, agreed to let the three cadets take a boat across the Hudson to smuggle the whiskey. The cadets planned to purchase one-half US gallon (1.9 L) of whiskey as an alcohol base for the eggnog party that would take place in the North Barracks two nights later. Phillip St. George (Virginia) was the 24-hour duty cadet guard of the day. Burnley, Center, and Roberts successfully obtained two US gallons (7.6 L) of whiskey, smuggling them into North Barracks room No. 33. Cadet T. M. Lewis (Kentucky) also returned with one US gallon (3.8 L) of rum from Benny's Tavern to North Barracks room No. 5.

=== 23 December 1826 ===
==== 07:00 ====
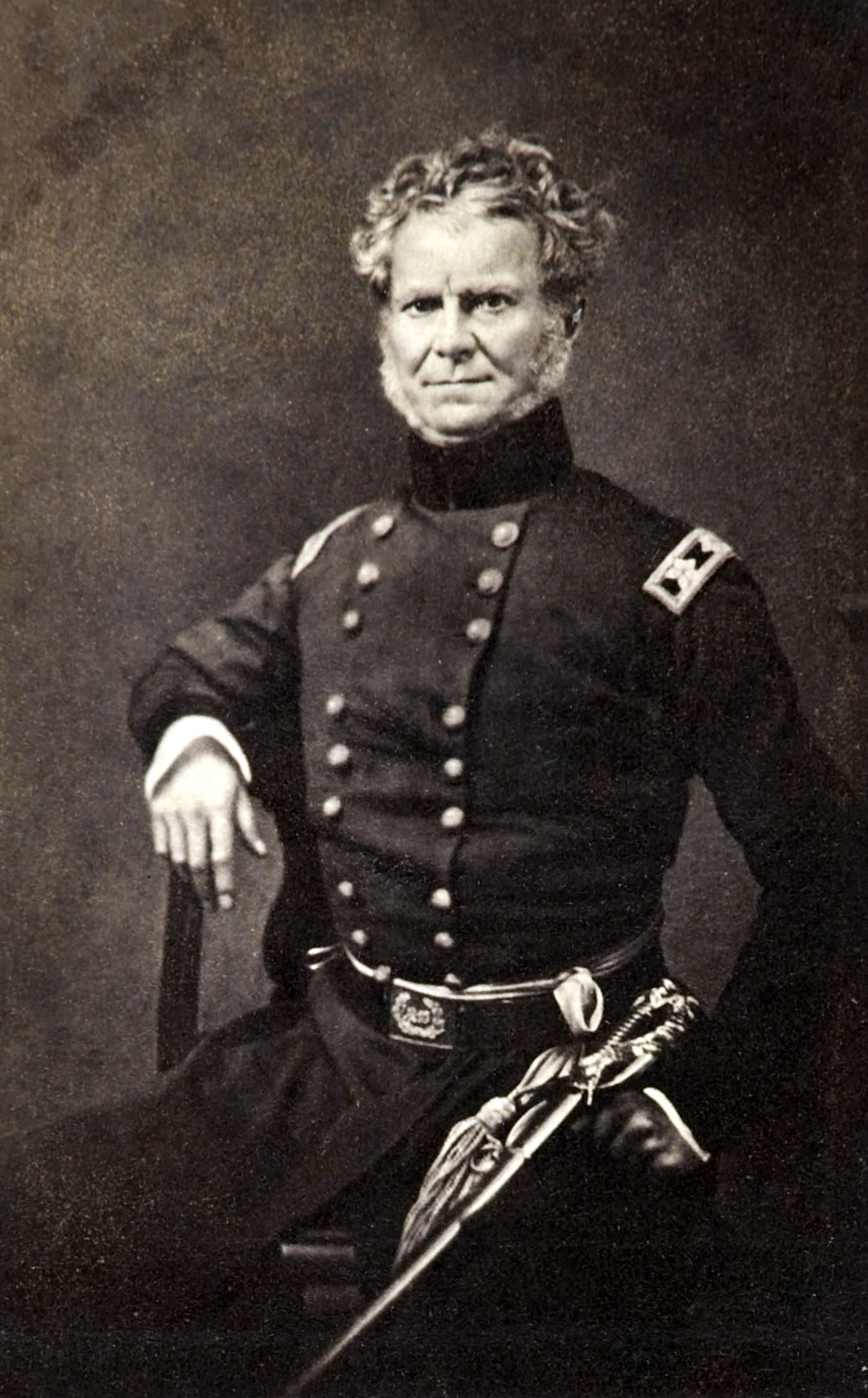
U.S. Military Academy commandant William Worth (1820–28) pictured between 1845 and 1849

Thayer met with George Bomford (New York) and Robert E. Lee (Virginia). Bomford was questioned about his parental correspondence by Thayer while Lee questioned Thayer about trigonometry problems for artillery gunnery. Classes and barracks inspections continued as usual that day.

==== 17:45 ====
A Christmas party took place at Thayer's residence at which wine was served. Reverend Charles McIlvane, the academy chaplain, was among the attendees. During the party, a conversation ensued between Thayer and Major William J. Worth, the Commandant of Cadets, about Jefferson Davis's (Mississippi) disciplinary problems. Entertainment was provided by the West Point band. The party ended at 21:30.

==== 18:00 ====
Four cadets, Walter B. Guion (Mississippi), Davis, John Stocker (Pennsylvania), and David Farrelly (Pennsylvania), met at Benny Havens' tavern. Most of the discussion was about everyday life among the cadets. They left before academy quartermaster Aeneas Mackay arrived.

Meanwhile, at the North Barracks, cadets were planning the party. Preparations included stealing bits and pieces of food during their visits to the mess hall. During this time, cadets residing in the South Barracks found out about the North Barracks' planned Christmas party.

=== 24–25 December 1826 ===
==== 22:00–04:15 ====
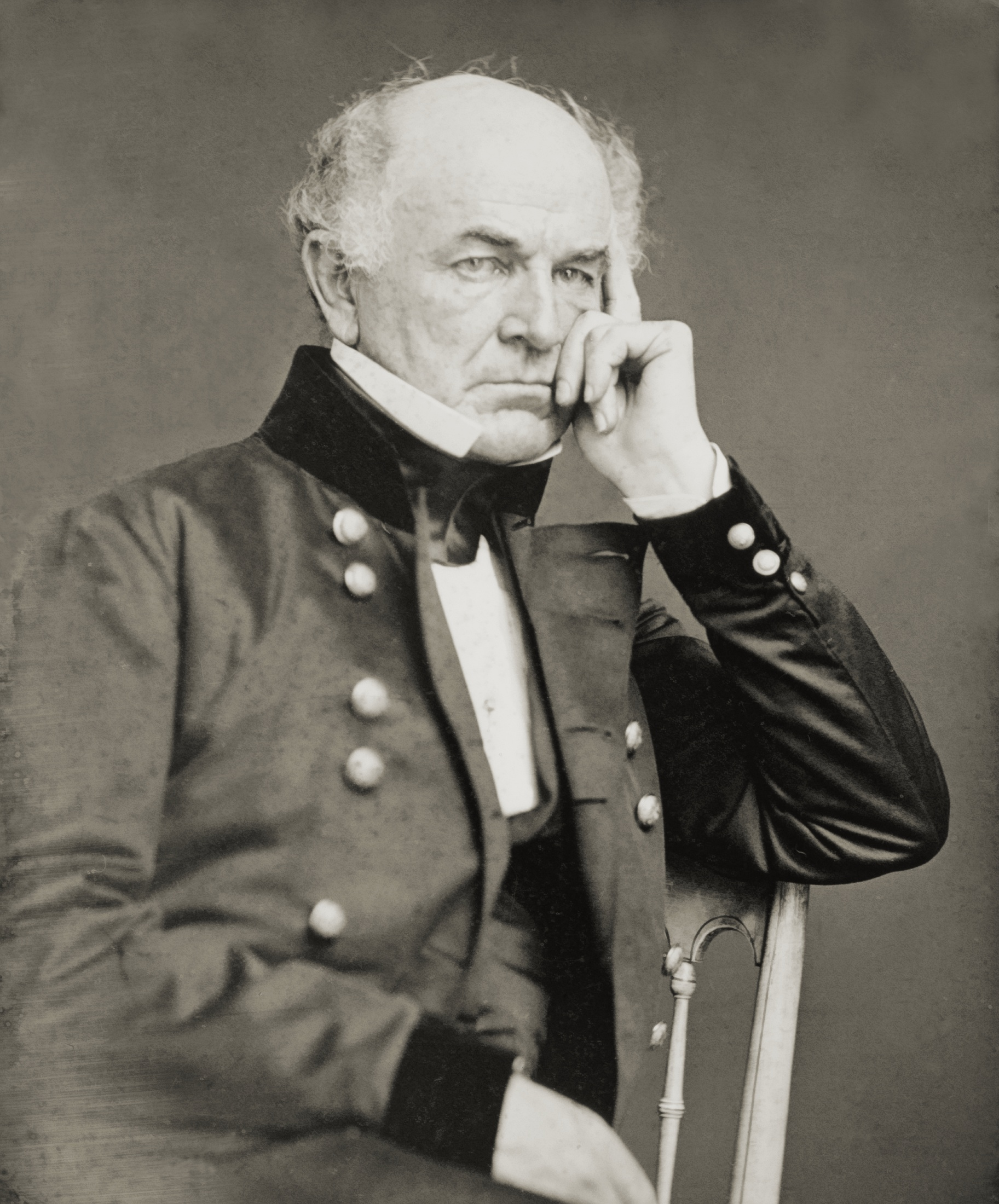
Portrait of Ethan Allen Hitchcock between 1851 and 1860. Hitchcock served as a faculty member at West Point at the time of the Eggnog Riot in 1826.

Nathaniel Eaton (Massachusetts) was the cadet in charge of the external post of the North Barracks. Captain Ethan Allen Hitchcock, a faculty member in military tactics, was also stationed in the North Barracks. Eaton and Hitchcock met and discussed the smuggled liquor in the North Barracks.

The eggnog party started among nine cadets in North Barracks room No. 28. Numerous cadets appeared as the party progressed, while another party began in room No. 5, mentioned by seven cadets including Davis. Farrelly went again to North's or Havens' and returned with another gallon of whiskey early on Christmas morning.

Cadet Charles Whipple (Michigan Territory), the division superintendent during the first part of the incident, went to North Barracks room No. 5 at 02:00 after hearing a commotion, interrupting a round of singing among eight cadets, including Davis. Whipple returned to his room after a verbal exchange with Davis and the other cadets. Hitchcock made another patrol around the barracks at 03:00. Lieutenant William A. Thornton was asleep while the events unfolded.

By 04:00, voices from the floor above Hitchcock were loud enough to cause the faculty member to investigate room No. 28, where Hitchcock knocked on the door and found six cadets drunk from the eggnog, as well as two others sleeping on a bed. Hitchcock ordered two of the cadets back to their rooms. After they left, Hitchcock woke the two sleeping cadets and ordered them to leave as well. Then he confronted cadet James W.M. "Weems" Berrien (Georgia), who responded with equal force. Hitchcock gave a stern lecture to the residents of the room for possessing alcohol on the premises. The captain left the room at 04:15. Berrien began verbalizing his rage toward Hitchcock, which led William D.C. "Billy" Murdock (District of Columbia) to lead an effort to organize a riot against Hitchcock.

=== 25 December 1826 ===
==== 04:30–06:05 ====
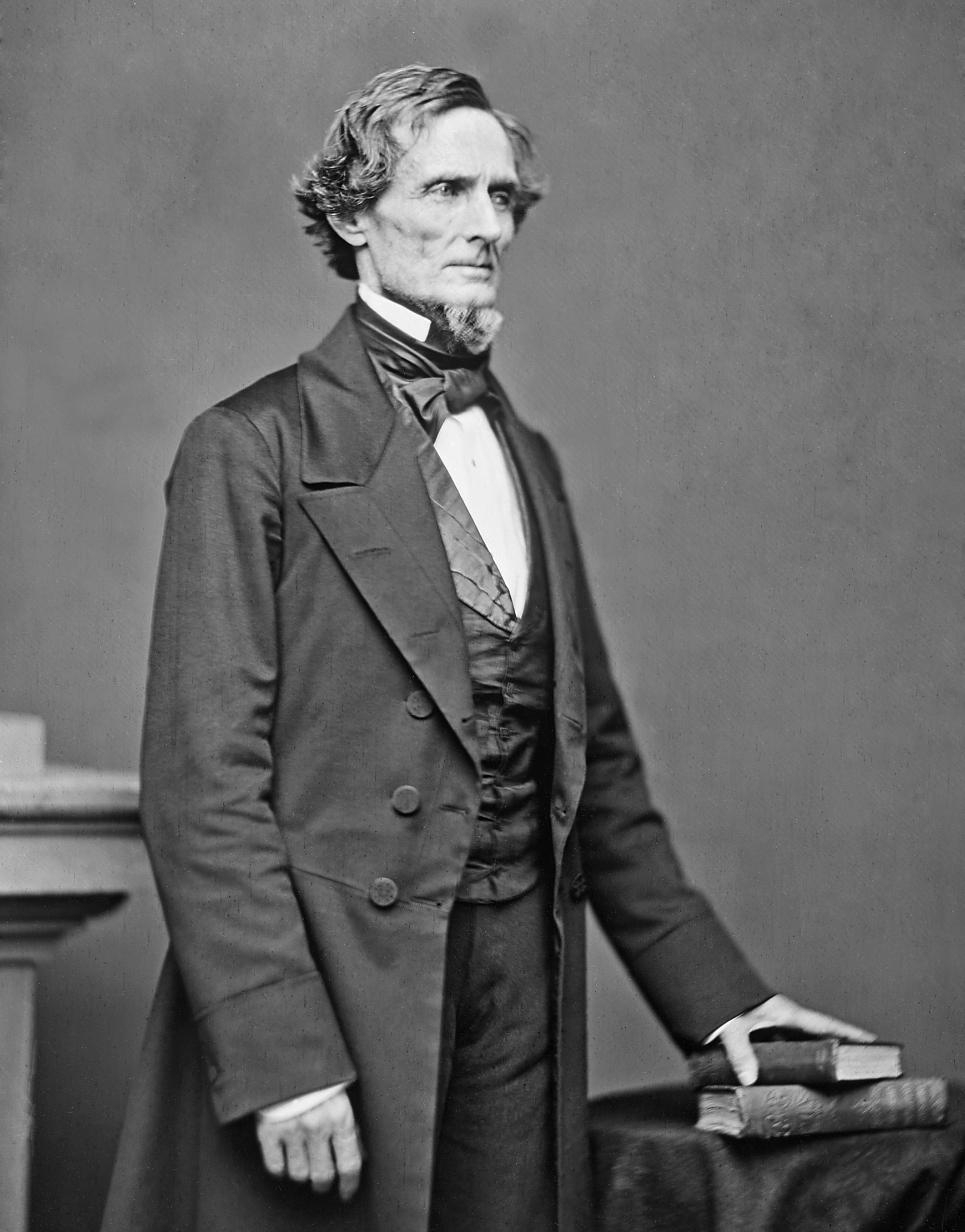
Jefferson Davis as President of the Confederate States of America in 1861. Davis was among the seventy cadets who took part in the Eggnog Riot of 24–25 December 1826.

Hitchcock went down to his room to sleep. Three times he heard knocks on the door only to find no one there. After finding another cadet drunk, Hitchcock saw Davis head over to room No. 5 where thirteen cadets were partying. Davis, seeing Hitchcock's arrival, warned the other cadets. The captain entered the room, ordering one of the cadets to open up another cadet's footlocker, but the cadet refused. Hitchcock ordered no more disorder, left the room, and started looking for Thornton around 04:50.

Meanwhile, Thornton had strolled the North Barracks between 21:00 on the 24th and 02:00 on Christmas Day observing the ongoing partying, before going to sleep at 02:00. He was awakened by loud yells and, once out of his room, was attacked by two cadets. Thornton then put cadet William P.N. Fitzgerald (New York) under arrest for brandishing a weapon. Fitzgerald retreated from Thornton, then told two cadets in room No. 29 about the arrest.

At this point, noises erupted from the South Barracks which distracted Thornton. While going to investigate that commotion, Thornton was knocked out by Roberts, who had been ejected from room No. 28 by Hitchcock earlier that evening.

Davis was asleep, but other cadets went looking for Hitchcock. Three other cadets were discovered by cadet James G. Overton (Tennessee), a relief sentinel and not involved in the parties, and questioned about their actions. They gave a drunken explanation about needing drums and a fife. At around 05:00, Hitchcock found another inebriated cadet wandering the academy. By this point, several window panes had been broken. Hitchcock returned to the room where he was staying, No. 8. Several cadets then attacked his door, Guion drawing his pistol and firing a shot into the room. Hitchcock opened the door and yelled at the cadets to stop. The captain then began arresting cadets.

Hitchcock ordered Eaton to find Worth's headquarters. Overton asked Hitchcock to find Thayer and Hitchcock replied "No, Mr. Overton. Fetch the com [Commandant Worth] here." Several of the drunken cadets thought Hitchcock had stated the bombardiers would be the ones to quell the riot, using heavy weapons, causing several cadets who were not drunk to take up arms in defense of the North Barracks. Thayer had been awoken at 05:00 by the sound of drums. He ordered his aide, Patrick Murphy, to get Major Worth because of what he could hear going on in the North Barracks.

Hitchcock continued restoring order in the North Barracks, getting into a fight with cadet Walter Otey (Virginia). Thornton awoke from the stairway where he had been knocked out and returned to his room. Hitchcock greeted him in his room at 05:45. By 06:00, other cadets who were not drinking were also involved in restoring order. The main rioters were attempting to recruit other cadets, but with no success.

Overton could not find Cadet Eaton, who was checking the South Barracks, but did find Major Worth. Hitchcock met Worth and told him what had transpired. By this time, Thayer's aide had arrived in the North Barracks' guardroom. The Second Artillery had arrived at the North Barracks by the time of reveille at 06:05.

==== 06:05–18:30 ====
Reveille sounded at 06:05, along with gunfire, the sound of glass breaking, profanity by cadets, cries of pain, and threats to academy officials. North Barracks residents who were not drunk from the eggnog were appalled by the damaged property. Cadets in the South Barracks were well rested, while other cadets in the North Barracks were disheveled. Some of the cadets remained in their rooms drinking, although some appeared in parade formation despite being drunk. Worth met with superintendent Thayer after the first formation to discuss what had happened in the North Barracks the previous evening. Thayer instructed Worth to get the officers into the North Barracks and restore order.

Captain Mackay, academy quartermaster, took down details of the damages to the property at North Barracks so repairs could take place in the following days. Many cadets who were drunk made it to company roll call at 06:20, though they were subdued. The mutiny officially ended when Cadet Captain James A.J. Bradford (Kentucky) called the corps to attention and dismissed them from the mess hall after breakfast. Chapel formation took place after breakfast, followed by two hours of service, with most of the drunk cadets still recovering.

Thayer was advised by Worth regarding the events at North Barracks. Captain Hitchcock and Lieutenant Thornton were bruised, while several cadets suffered minor injuries, and Fitzgerald suffered a hand injury. Worth told Thayer that between fifty and ninety cadets had been involved in the mutiny. Later that day, Thayer met with Gouverneur Kemble, an ordnance manufacturer in Cold Spring, New York, to discuss different items, including the events at West Point. Kemble asked Thayer what he would do about the misconduct, to which Thayer replied he did not know.

=== 26 December 1826 ===
==== 07:00–08:00 ====
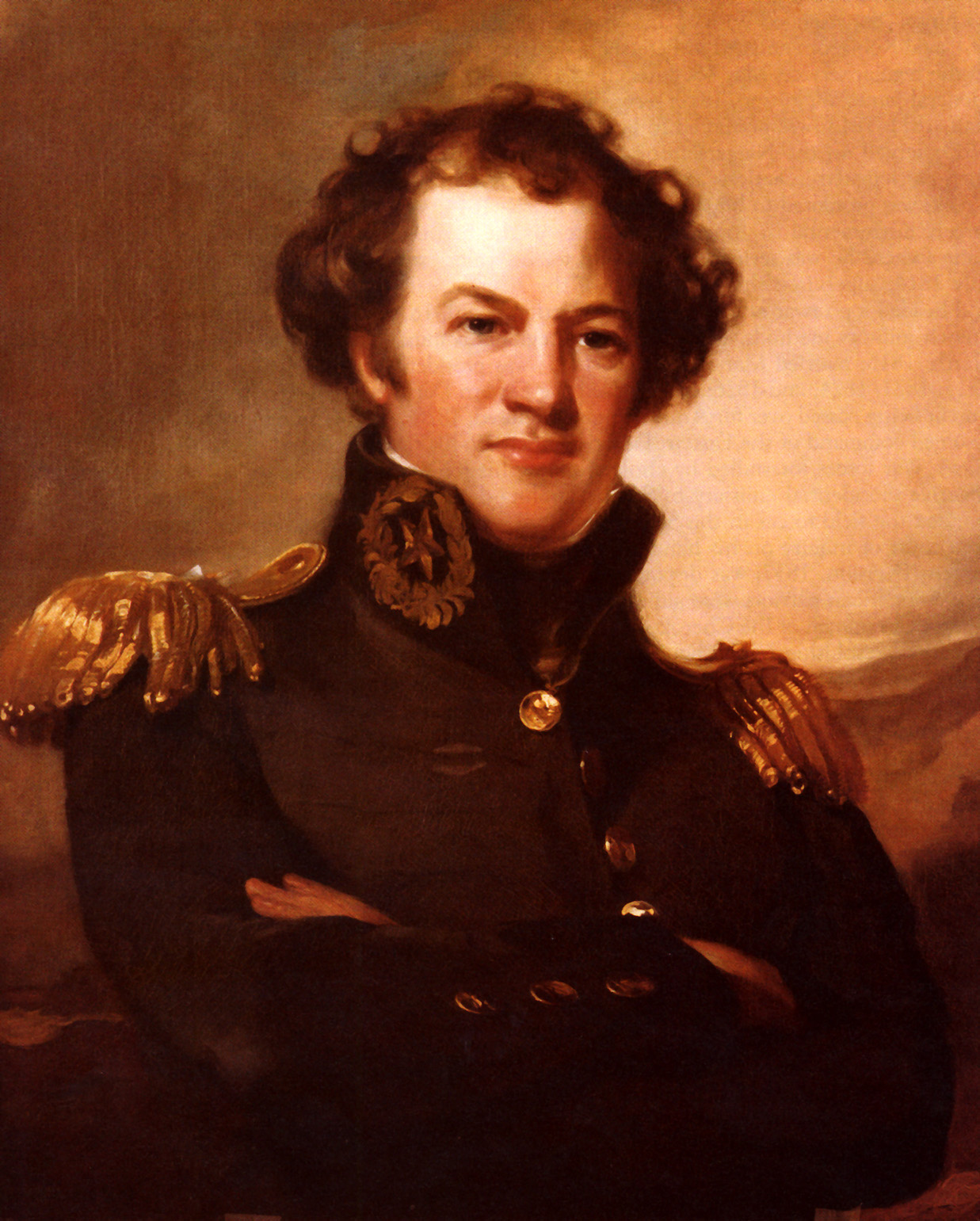
1829 portrait of Alexander Macomb, inspector of the United States Military Academy

A faculty and staff meeting took place, with all but Captain Thomas C. Legate of the 2nd Artillery A Battery and a few assistant professors in attendance. Thayer informed them that Major General Alexander Macomb, Chief of Engineers and inspector general of the academy, had been told of the riot, and that he was awaiting orders from Macomb. The superintendent also informed the attendees that an inquiry would take place during semester finals in January 1827, so some of the cadets would face simultaneous examinations and inquiry.

Cadet Battalion Order 98 was read at formation and posted at several prominent locations at the academy. Twenty-two cadets were placed under house arrest until further notice; among them was Davis, who had been reported as a malefactor by Hitchcock and Thornton.

=== 6 January 1827 ===
Thayer reviewed Order 49, dated 30 December 1826 and signed by Chief of Engineers Macomb, ordering a court of inquiry to be assembled as soon as possible to investigate the Christmas riots. No deadline was given by the War Department in Washington, DC, though the academy was expected to get it done as soon as possible. Major Worth was president of the inquiry, with Lieutenant Henry H. Gird acting as secretary (court reporter), and two other faculty and staff to be selected by Thayer for court duties. If the inquiry determined that further disciplinary action was necessary, Thayer was empowered to court-martial any cadet or other military personnel. Worth elected Hitchcock and Lieutenant William Bryant to the court, despite Hitchcock's involvement in controlling the riots in North Barracks.

=== 7 January 1827 ===
In the midst of the academy exams, Gird informed the cadets of the court of inquiry, which was to begin the next day.

=== 8–22 January 1827 ===
The inquiry included testimony from 167 witnesses. MacKay stated US$168.83 (roughly $5,380.27 in 2024) worth of damages had occurred. Thayer testified that he never ordered the bombardiers, the Second Artillery, to police the barracks. The academic board recommended James W. Hamilton (at-large) be discharged for bad conduct and five others, all fourth classmen (freshman or plebes), were dismissed for lack of aptitude in certain academic disciplines or bad conduct. Several other cadets also were dismissed. A final report was presented to Thayer on 19 January 1827, which Thayer and Worth met to discuss after dinner that evening.

Following testimony, the inquiry determined that seventy cadets had been involved in the riots. Thayer picked the worst offenders (those who smuggled the whiskey, the cadets who incited the riots, and several others) for prosecution at court-martial.

=== 24 January – 8 March 1827 ===
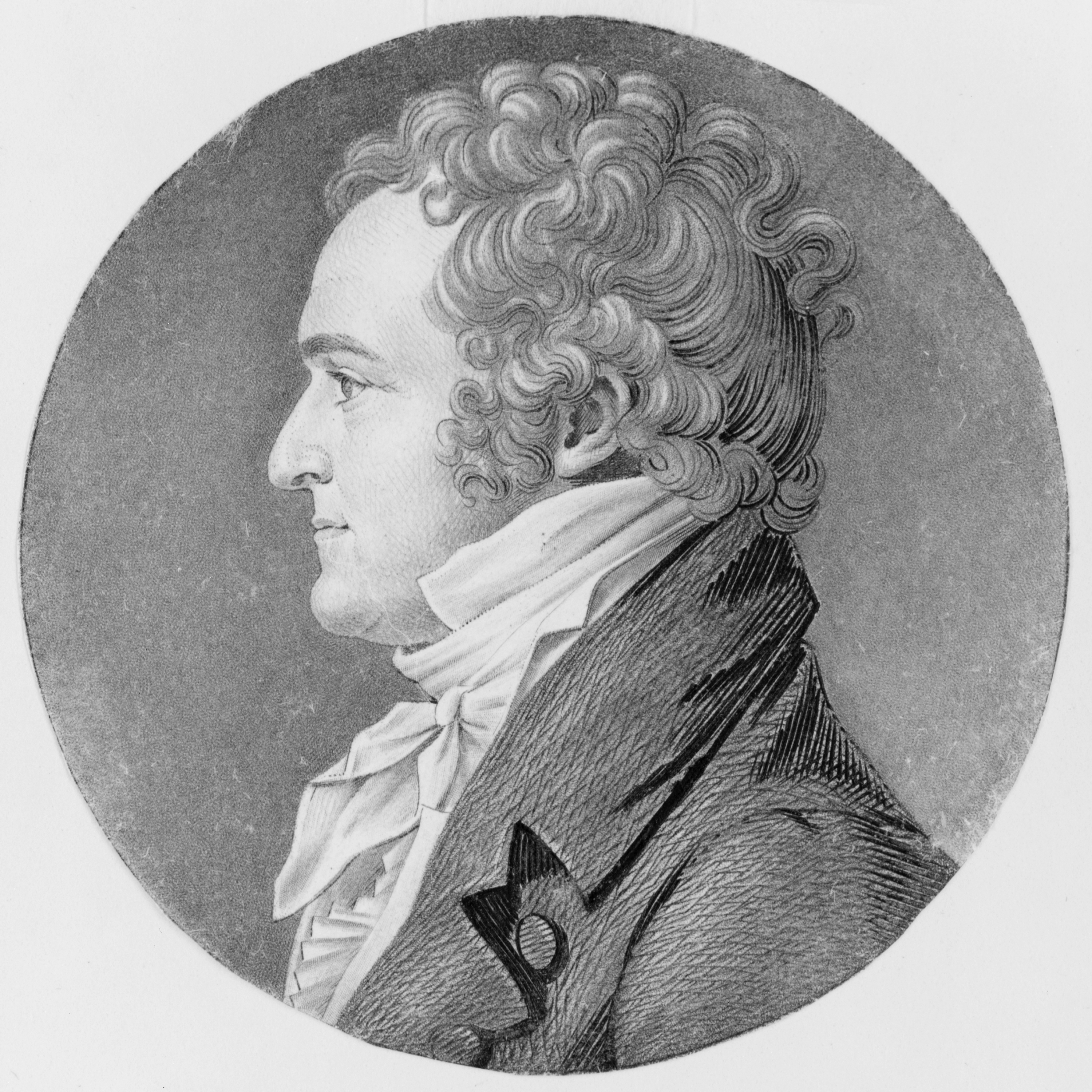
c. 1807 picture of U.S. Attorney General William Wirt, who in 1819 stated that West Point cadets were subject to military law and trials by court-martial

In 1819, Attorney General of the United States William Wirt had opined that "the Corps ... form part of the land forces of the United States..." and its members were thus subject to military law and trials by court-martial. Wirt's opinion was supported by United States Secretary of War John C. Calhoun and President of the United States James Monroe.

Nineteenth-century American military justice was founded in the American Revolution. The sentences were reviewed by the secretary of war, the United States Congress, and the president. A general court consisted of between five and thirteen officers serving as jurors and magistrates. The accused was his own lawyer, prepared his own defense, and could plead guilty to one or more charges against him while contesting other charges.

Trials were held from 08:00 to 15:00 daily or during daylight hours, whichever was later. A standard trial began with the charges being read, the defendant giving his plea, and opening statements by the prosecution and defense attorneys. Witness testimony then began, followed by closing statements given by the prosecution and defense attorneys, and the jury's decision. If the verdict was guilty, the defendant was then sentenced.

The twenty cases were divided into three parts by the war department for administrative convenience. The court-martial trials were held in succession without break from 26 January, with Lieutenant Gird serving as trial judge advocate.

During the progression of the trials, Davis was released from house arrest along with two other cadets. Cadet Humphreys was arrested on 27 January. Gird stayed as trial judge advocate until 8 March, when he asked to be released; he was replaced by Lieutenant William H. C. Bartlett.

=== 9 March – 3 May 1827 ===
Bartlett started his duties on 9 March at 10:00, and the trials concluded on 16 March. Thayer forwarded the records to General Maccomb and Secretary of War James Barbour in late March; Barbour then sent the information to President John Quincy Adams. Adams read the findings, and adjusted some of the verdicts for the cadets. The case was closed on 3 May.

== Personnel involved in the riot ==
=== Cadets ===
Name	Court-martial date(s)	Verdict in court-martial	Adams's review	Comments	Reference
Jefferson Davis	Not listed	No charges filed	Not applicable	Graduated in 1828, U.S. Secretary of War, President of the Confederate States of America	
William E. Aisquith	29 January	Guilty – suspended six months. Rank reduced from cadet lieutenant to private.	Remitted	Graduated in 1827	
John C. Stocker	30 January – 11 February	Guilty – expelled on six charges	Approved		
Benjamin G. Humphreys	Not listed	Guilty – expelled	Approved	Confederate Army general; Governor of Mississippi, 1865–1868	
Walter Burling Guion	9 February	Guilty – expelled	Approved	Roommate of Jefferson Davis, "leader of the Helvetians," son of Society of the Cincinnati member Isaac Guion; became a military engineer	
David M. Farrelly	10 February	Guilty – expelled	Approved		
Thomas M. "T.M." Lewis	12–13 February	Guilty – expelled on four charges	Approved		
William P.N. Fitzgerald	13–16, 19 February	Guilty – expelled	Approved	Pleaded guilty to the first charge, but not to the rest. Lee testified in the case.	
James W. M. "Weems" Berrien	Not listed	Guilty – expelled	Approved his expulsion, but his remittance forbade Berrien from ever serving in the U.S. military again.	Lee testified in the case. Berrien went to the secretary of war on 2 February for assistance, despite making poor comments about Hitchcock. Son of Society of the Cincinnati member Maj. John Berrien; younger half-brother of U.S. Senator and Andrew Jackson cabinet member John M. Berrien.	
John Archibald Campbell	Not listed	Call for expulsion with Berrien, but rejected	Not applicable	Justice of the United States Supreme Court, 1853–1861	
William R. Burnley	23–27 February	Guilty – expelled	Approved	Had two more arrests between the Eggnog Riot and the court-martial (19, 22 January 17 February).	
Samuel Alexander Roberts	26–28 February, 2 March	Guilty – expelled	Approved	Secretary of State of the Republic of Texas, 1841	
George E. Bomford	2 March	Guilty – expelled on four charges, but resigned	Approved, but allowed the cadet's resignation		
Anthony B. Johnson	6 March	Guilty – expelled on four charges	Approved		
James L. Thompson	6 March	Guilty – expelled, but recommended sentence be remitted	Not applicable	Graduated in 1828	
Hugh W. Mercer	9, 10, 12 March	Guilty – expelled on two of the four charges	Remitted	Graduated in 1828; Confederate Army general	
Benjamin F. Gard	13 March	Guilty – rank reduced from sergeant to private. Reprimanded.	Permitted to keep cadet sergeant chevrons		
Thomas Swords Jr.	12 March	Guilty – expelled, but court remitted sentence after being found guilty	Granted clemency	Graduated in 1829	
William D.C. Murdock	13 March	Guilty – expelled, but sentence remitted	Granted clemency		
Richard B. Screven	13 March	Guilty – expelled, but sentence remitted	Granted clemency	Graduated in 1829	
Fayette H. Novelle	14–15 March	Guilty – expelled, but suspended until January 1828	Granted clemency		

=== Soldier ===
Private John Dougan was sentenced to one month of hard labor, and forfeited his whiskey ration for the same period.

== Sources ==
- Agnew, James B. (1979). Eggnog Riot: The Christmas Mutiny at West Point. Presidio Press. ISBN 978-0-89141-036-2.
  - Review: Marszalek, John F. (1980). "Review of Eggnog Riot: The Christmas Mutiny at West Point". The Journal of Southern History. 46 (3): 431–432. doi:10.2307/2207261. JSTOR 2207261.
