= Thomas Jones Hardeman =

American businessman and pioneer (1788–1854)

- Born: January 31, 1788; Davidson County, Tennessee
- Died: January 11, 1854 (aged 65); Bastrop County, Texas

Thomas Jones Hardeman (January 31, 1788–January 11, 1854) was an American businessman who is the namesake of two counties of the United States. He served as a Tennessee militiaman under Andrew Jackson and John Coffee during the War of 1812. One of several notable sons of pioneer of Middle Tennessee Thomas Hardeman, Thomas Jones Hardeman is the namesake of Hardeman County, Tennessee in the western part of the state. Thomas J. Hardeman was later an influential early American settler of Texas. He served in the Congress of the Republic of Texas from Matagorda and as a Texas state representative from Bastrop. With his brother Bailey Hardeman, he is a namesake of Hardeman County, Texas.

== Early life and career ==
Hardeman was born in Davidson County, Tennessee, where his father Thomas Hardeman had established Hardeman's Station. Thomas Hart Benton, future U.S. Senator from Missouri, was a customer of the Hardeman family store and mentions their support of his early legal career in his writings. Hardeman was also licensed to practice law. According to a nephew:

My grandfather Hardeman was twice married, his two wives being sisters, but all his children were the issue of his first marriage. He brought up his sons to his own business, except John and Bailey, to whom he gave fine educations. They were intended for the bar, but never practiced...The Hardemans were generally men of the world, first fond of fashionable pleasures, dress and show, and afterwards seekers of fortune. But, though wild when young men, I have yet to hear of the first instance in which they were ever accused of any criminal offense, great or small. They sometimes had fisticuff fights (though very rarely), but I never knew one of them to fight a duel. With very rare exceptions, they all paid their debts. They were generally good business men, and good traders in such property as lands and stock and were punctilious in keeping their promises and firm in telling the truth....They were candid and resolute men and you always knew how you stood with them. If they disliked you, they would tell you so.

According to Nicholas Perkins Hardeman, a distant relative and Cal State Long Beach history professor who wrote a family history based on a collection of letters and documents, "The Hardeman sons, like their father, accomplished their labors with much more help than their use of the pronoun I indicated. All of them owned slaves. By 1820, Thomas Jones Hardeman had ten and his brother Eleazar eight. Judging from the frequent mention of slave transactions it must be assumed that there was heavy dependence on slave labor and much concern with the financial investment in the Negro work force."

== War of 1812 ==
Hardeman participated in the southwestern theater of the War of 1812. He was a quartermaster of Andrew Jackson's troops on the Natchez expedition. Hardeman initially served in the 39th Infantry of the Tennessee militia under Thomas Hart Benton. Later he was moved into John Coffee's First Regiment of Volunteer Mounted Gunmen. He participated in the Creek War.

He was ranked as a captain. He was reported killed in the fight near New Orleans on December 23, 1814 but was actually a British prisoner of war.

He is often called Colonel Hardeman.

== Tennessee lands ==
On April 15, 1815, Hardeman bought "200 acres of land on Hurricane Fork of Carter's Creek" in Maury County, Tennessee, which adjoined lands of his father-in-law Ezekiel Polk, and William Polk and Sam Polk, and "probably made his home there for several years."

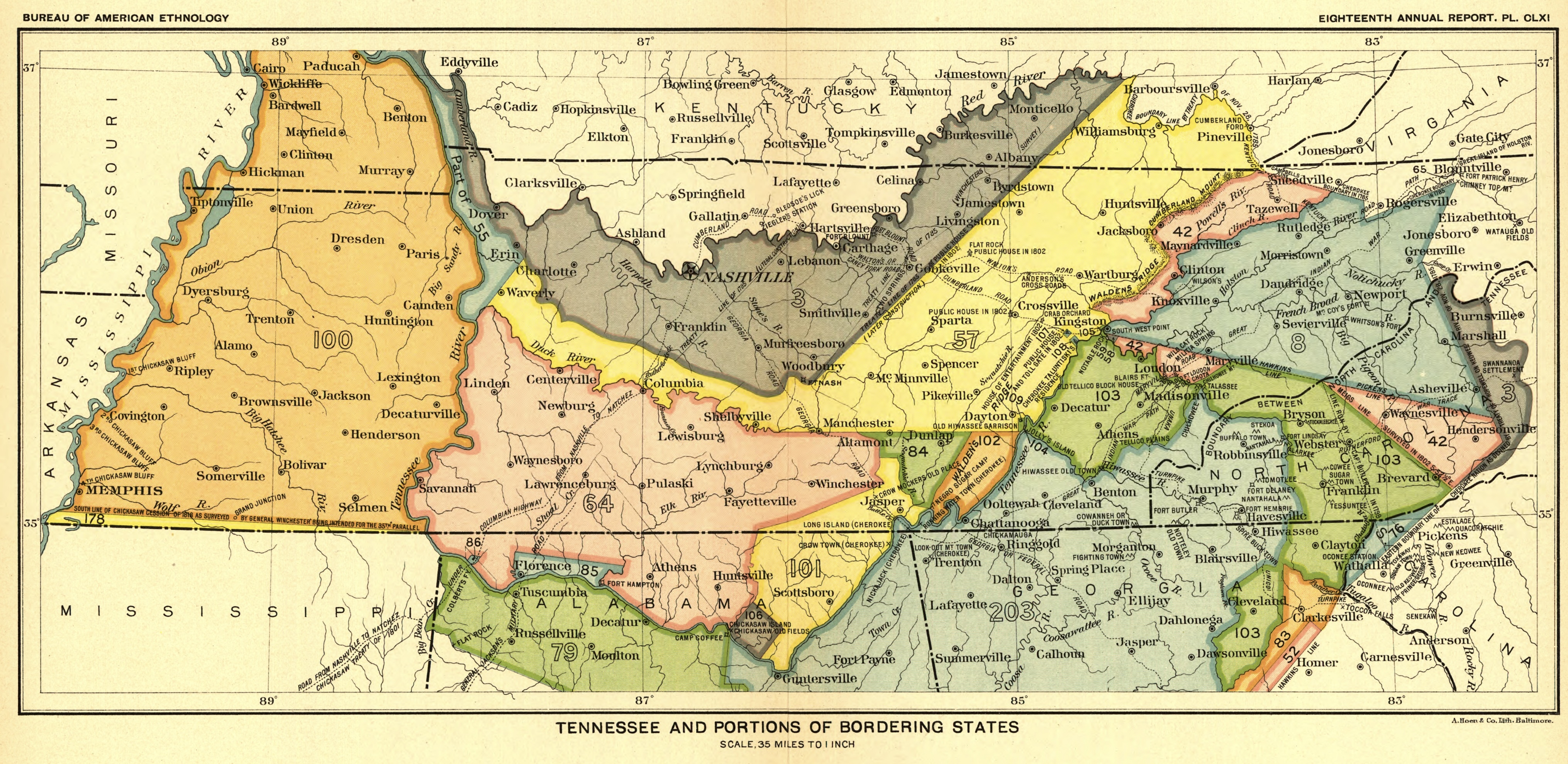
Map from Indian land cessions in the United States showing Bolivar and the Hatchie River

West Tennessee was opened to settlement following the 1818 Treaty of Tuscaloosa with the Chickasaw, negotiated by Andrew Jackson and Isaac Shelby. Hardeman relocated to Hardin County, Tennessee in 1818. In 1823 Hardeman County was created by the legislature in the same vicinity where Hardeman had settled. In 1823, he built a mill on Pleasant Run Creek. The current county seat, Bolivar, was located a mile south of Hatchee Town, which had earlier been a Hatchie River crossing known to the Chickasaw. The log-built courthouse, constructed in 1824, is now the Little Courthouse Museum, which collection includes Thomas Jones Hardeman's desk. He was Hardeman County court clerk from 1823 to 1833.

Hardeman was probably engaged in land speculation ("not the least part of his influence on the area was his attracting of other settlers"). He owned property in Hardeman county, Fayette county, and Henderson county. He also served as Bolivar town commissioner and Hardeman county road overseer.

== Texas ==
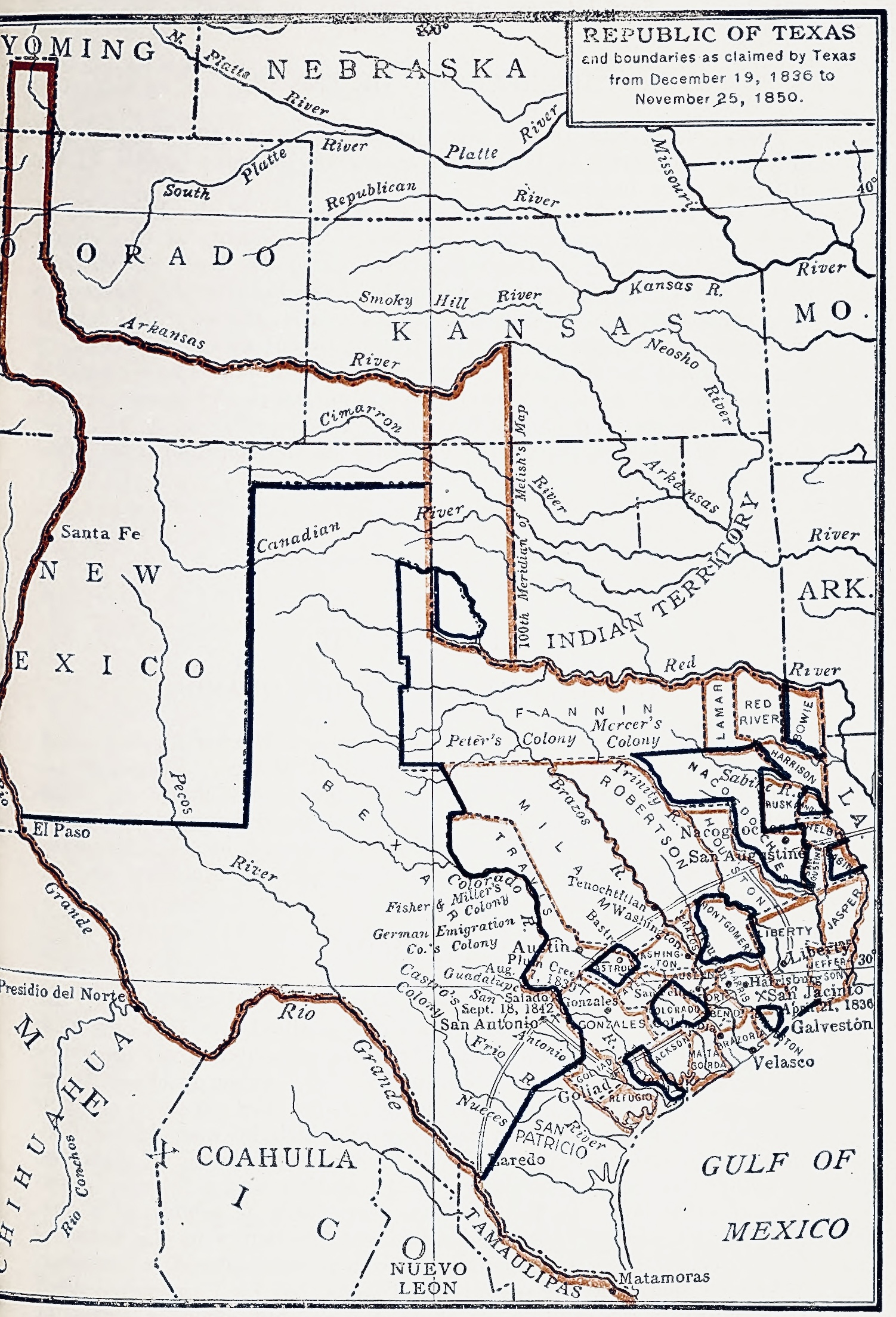
Republic of Texas showing boundaries claimed by Texas, 1836–1850 (Z. T. Fulmore, 1926)

Hardeman and his brother Bailey Hardeman moved to Texas in October 1835. They settled on Caney Creek in the Matagorda district.

He served in the Congress of the Texas Republic. Hardeman served in the Texas Republic House of Representatives from Matagorda County in the 2nd Congress of the Republic of Texas (1837–1838).

He later moved to Bastrop County, which he represented in the legislature of the U.S. state of Texas 1847–1849. He died in 1854 and was buried in Bastrop County. In 1937, his remains were reinterred at the Texas State Cemetery in Austin, Texas.

== Personal life ==
Hardeman was married in 1814 to Mary Polk, a daughter of Ezekiel Polk and an aunt of U.S. president James K. Polk. She was from Maury County. His second wife was Eliza DeWitt Hamilton, a daughter of Green DeWitt. The Confederate General William Polk Hardeman was one of Thomas Jones Hardeman's four sons.

== Legacy ==
Hardeman County, Tennessee was organized in 1823 and named for Hardeman, who lived there in his father-in-law's colony. Hardeman County, Texas, organized in 1885 in northwest Texas, is one of 28 Texas counties named for Tennesseans.

== See also ==
- Seth Lewis (judge), brother-in-law
- Hatchie River Ferry
- Title and rank in the antebellum U.S. South

== Sources ==
- Hardeman, Nicholas Perkins (1977). Wilderness Calling: The Hardeman Family in the American Westward Movement, 1750–1900. Knoxville, Tennessee: University of Tennessee Press. ISBN 978-0-87049-194-8. LCCN 76000980. OCLC 2005980 – via Internet Archive.
- Hall, Wm. Kearney (1958). Descendants of Nicholas Perkins of Virginia. Ann Arbor, Mich.?: s.n.
- Lindley, Ernest R. (October 1, 1941). Biographical Directory of the Texan Conventions and Congresses: 1832–1845. Austin, Texas: Texas House of Representatives. LCCN 42024990. OCLC 4727885 – via Portal to Texas History, University of North Texas Libraries (UNT Libraries Government Documents Department).
- Turner, William Bruce (1955). History of Maury county, Tennessee. Nashville, Tennessee: The Parthenon Press. OCLC 7894297.
