= Andrews Chapel =

Andrews Chapel may refer to:

- Andrews Chapel (McIntosh, Alabama)
- Andrews Memorial Chapel, Dunedin, Florida, NRHP-listed
- Andrews Chapel United Methodist Church, Durham, North Carolina
