= Montpier =

Historic house in Tennessee, United States

- U.S. National Register of Historic Places
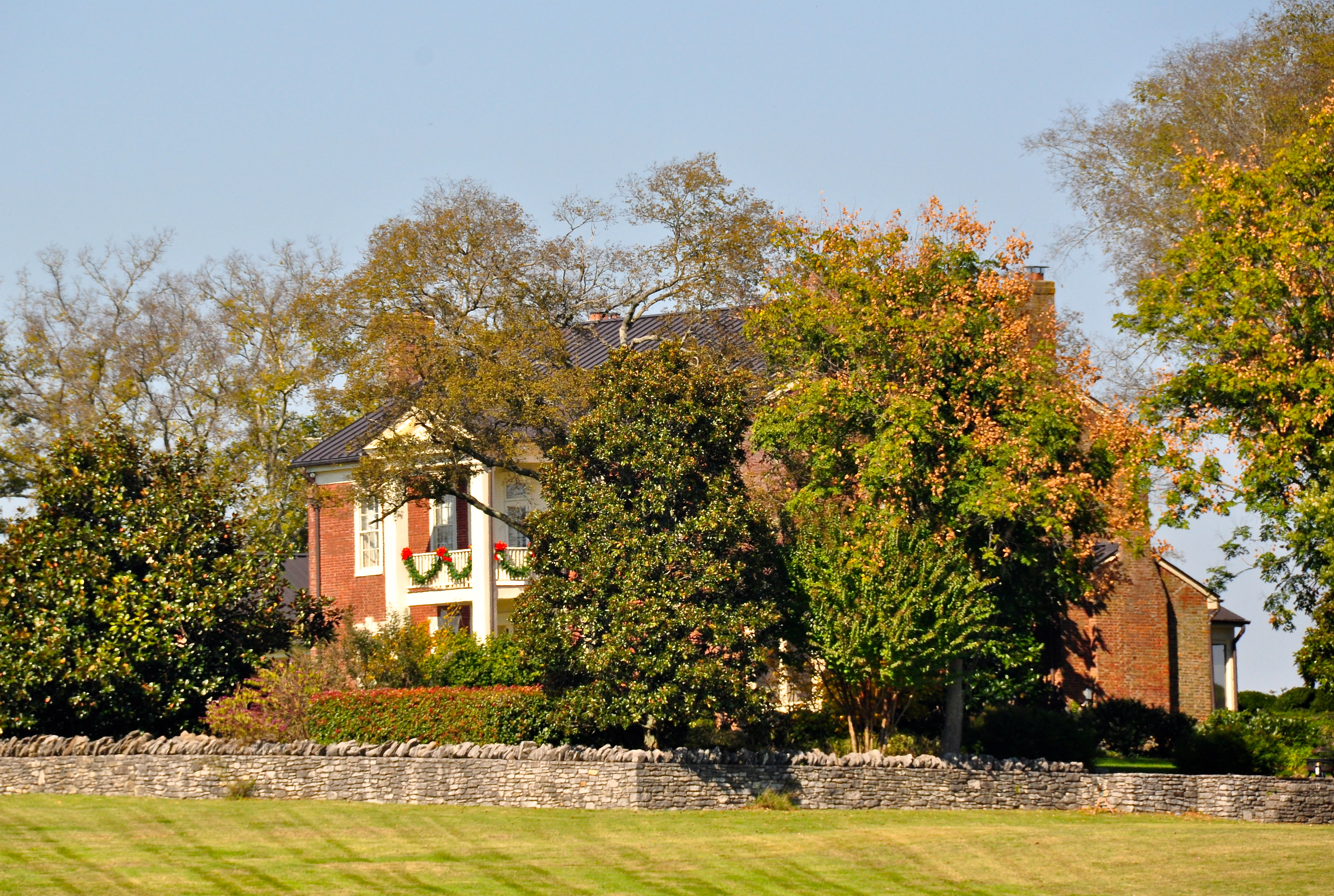
- Montpier, October 2014.

- Location within Tennessee Location within the United States
- Location: Off Hillsboro Pike, northwest of Franklin, Tennessee
- Coordinates: 35°58′59″N 86°56′1″W
- Area: 2 acres (0.81 ha)
- Built: 1821
- Architect: Perkins, Nicholas
- Architectural style: Federal, Greek Revival
- NRHP reference No.: 82004073
- Added to NRHP: August 26, 1982

Montpier, also known as Nicholas Perkins House, is a two-and-a-half-story brick house built on a stone foundation during 1821–22. It has a gable roof with twin brick chimneys at each gable end. It was built with slave labor. Its original style was Federal, but its facade was modified in the 1859s by addition of a Greek Revival two-tiered portico and a doorway with side lights, corner lights and transom.

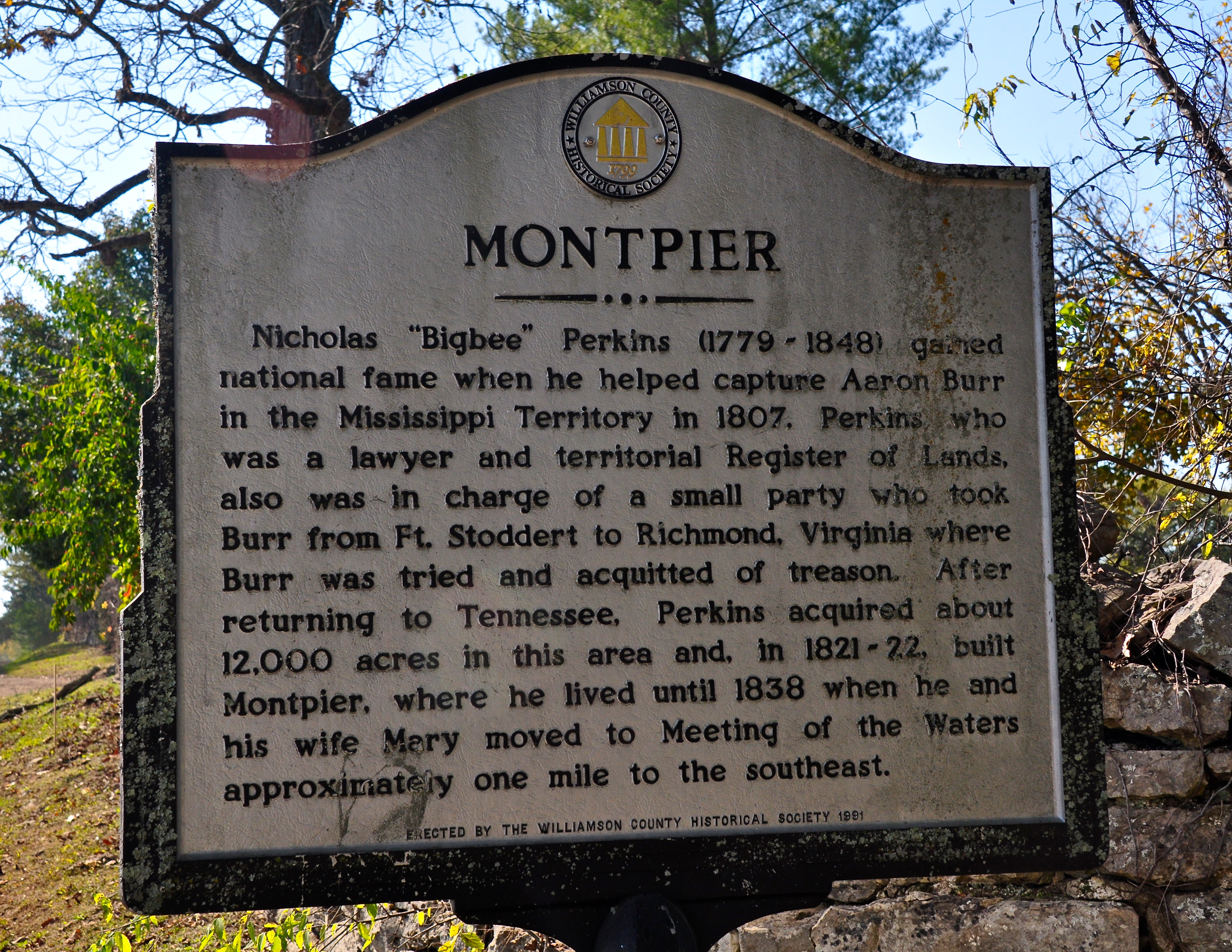
The Williamson County Historical Marker for Montpier.

It was built for Nicholas "Bigbee" Perkins III (1779-1848), of a plantation family. Perkins is notable as the man who recognized Aaron Burr and assisted in Burr's arrest for treason on February 18, 1807.

The house was listed on the National Register of Historic Places in 1982.
