= Bailey Hardeman =

American lawyer

- Born: c. 1795
- Died: September 24, 1836 (aged 40–41); Caney Creek, Matagorda County, Texas
- Citizenship: U.S. and Republic of Texas
- Occupation: Politician
- Years active: 1812-1836
- Known for: Texas Declaration of Independence; Constitution of the Republic of Texas
- Spouse: Rebecca Amanda Wilson
- Children: Amelia Hardeman; Samuel Wilson Hardeman; John Hardeman; Emeline Hardeman; Catherine Hardeman; Thomas Hardeman
- Parent(s): Thomas Hardeman; Mary Perkins

Bailey Hardeman (c. 1795–1836) was the first secretary of the treasury for the Republic of Texas.

== Family ==
Bailey was a younger son of Thomas Hardeman and his first wife Mary Perkins. Both families were early settlers in Tidewater Virginia. Thomas Hardeman was a Revolutionary War soldier and served for years as a representative from Davidson County when it was the Territory South of the River Ohio, North Carolina, and Tennessee. Bailey served as a First Lieutenant in the War of 1812.

Hardeman County, Texas, was named for the brothers, Bailey and Thomas Hardeman. Both were part of the first Republic of Texas government. Hardeman County, Tennessee, was named for his brother, Colonel Thomas Jones Hardeman.

== Texas politics ==
Bailey, like several of his brothers and brothers-in-law, had various financial interests included trade into Mexico. The interest in trade with Mexico may have prompted his move to the Tejas area in 1835. Bailey and his small family settled in Matagorda County. It was almost natural for him to fall into a leadership role in the local politics given his experience in Tennessee. On 28 Nov 1835 General Council of the Provisional Government of Texas elected him one of the commissioners to organize the militia for Matagorda Municipality.

Upon his arrival at Washington-on-the-Brazos on March 1, 1836, he was appointed to a twenty-one-member committee to draw up a constitution for the Republic of Texas. The resulting Constitution was approved in mid-March. The delegates elected him Secretary of the Treasury.

On 27 Mar 1836 he and Lorenzo de Zavala were appointed commissioners to accompany Santa Anna to Vera Cruz to negotiate a peace treaty.

Bailey Hardeman was one of the committee of five elected to draft a Declaration of Independence from Mexico on 2 May 1836. He was also one of the fifty-nine signers of the Texas Declaration of Independence.

Bailey died of fever at Caney Creek, Matagorda County, Texas on 24 September 24, 1836. His obituary was printed in the Telegraph and Texas Register and also the Nashville Republican.

== See also ==
- Hardeman County, Tennessee
- Hardeman County, Texas
