= William Polk Hardeman =

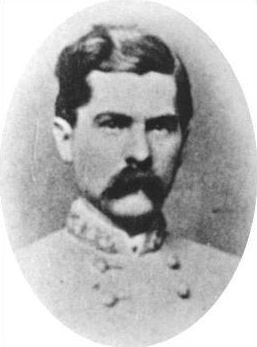
- Hardeman in 1865
- Born: November 4, 1816; Williamson County, Tennessee
- Died: April 8, 1898 (aged 81); Austin, Texas
- Burial place: Austin, Texas
- Military career
- Allegiance: Republic of Texas; United States of America; Confederate States of America
- Branch: Texas Army National Guard; United States Army; Confederate States Army
- Service years: 1846–1848 (USA); 1861–1865 (CSA)
- Rank: First Lieutenant (USA); Brigadier General, CSA
- Nickname: "Gotch"
- Commands: 4th Texas Cavalry Regiment; Hardeman's Cavalry Brigade
- Conflicts: Texas Revolution; Mexican–American War; American Civil War

William Polk Hardeman (November 4, 1816 – April 8, 1898) was a Confederate States Army brigadier general during the American Civil War. He had fought in the Texas War of Independence in 1836. He was a member of the Texas Rangers and fought in the Mexican-American War in 1846–1847. During the Civil War, he participated in Brigadier General Henry Hopkins Sibley's New Mexico Campaign and in the Red River Campaign. He had a variety of occupations after the war, including superintendent of public buildings and grounds at Austin, Texas.

== Early life ==
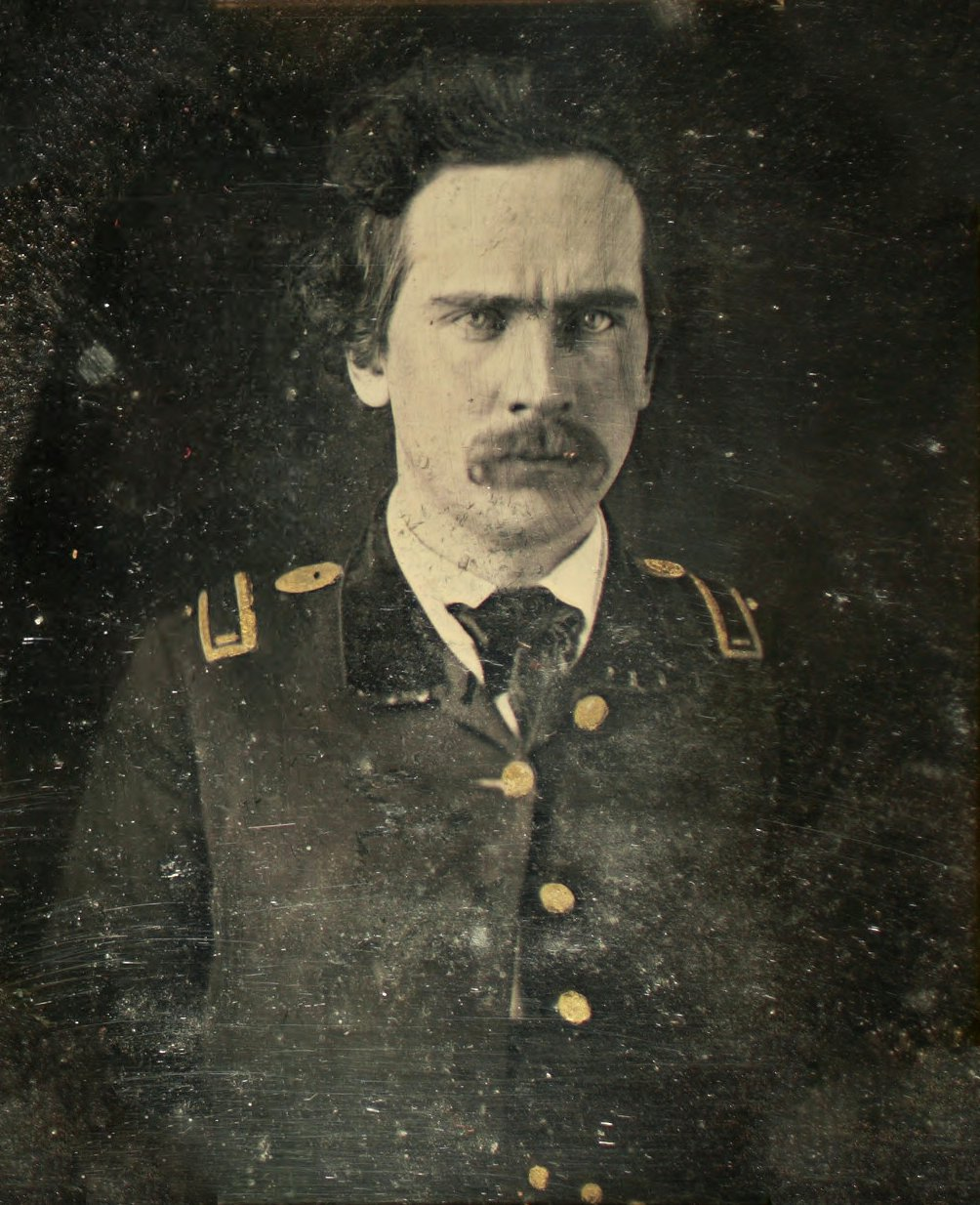
Hardeman as lieutenant in 1846.

William Polk "Gotch" Hardeman was born on November 4, 1816, in Williamson County, Tennessee. He moved with his father Thomas Jones Hardeman to Texas in 1835 and fought in the Texas War of Independence. He joined the Texas Rangers and fought in the Mexican–American War in 1846–1847 under Ben McCulloch, who was later a Confederate Army general as well.

== American Civil War ==
Hardeman began his Confederate service in May 1861 as a captain of the 4th Texas Cavalry Regiment (sometimes referred to as the 4th Texas Mounted Rifles). In that capacity, he served in Sibley's New Mexico Campaign, including the Confederate victory at the Battle of Valverde and defeat and retreat after the Battle of Glorieta Pass. Lieutenant Colonel William Read Scurry, in command at Valverde, praised Hardeman for leading the last, successful charge of the battle.

Hardeman was promoted to lieutenant colonel of the regiment on March 28, 1862, the date of the Battle of Glorieta Pass, and to colonel in January 1863. In December 1863, he briefly took command of a brigade in the Confederate Trans-Mississippi Department and again commanded a brigade beginning in September 1864. Hardeman led his regiment during the Red River Campaign, including the Battle of Mansfield and the Battle of Pleasant Hill on April 8 and 9, 1864, and during the subsequent pursuit of the retreating Union Army under Major General Nathaniel P. Banks after those battles. Upon the recommendation of Trans-Mississippi Department commander General E. Kirby Smith on October 28, 1864, Hardeman was appointed a brigadier general to rank from March 17, 1865. He commanded a mounted brigade in Texas and Louisiana during the final eight months of the war, until May 1865. No record of his parole has been found.

== Aftermath ==
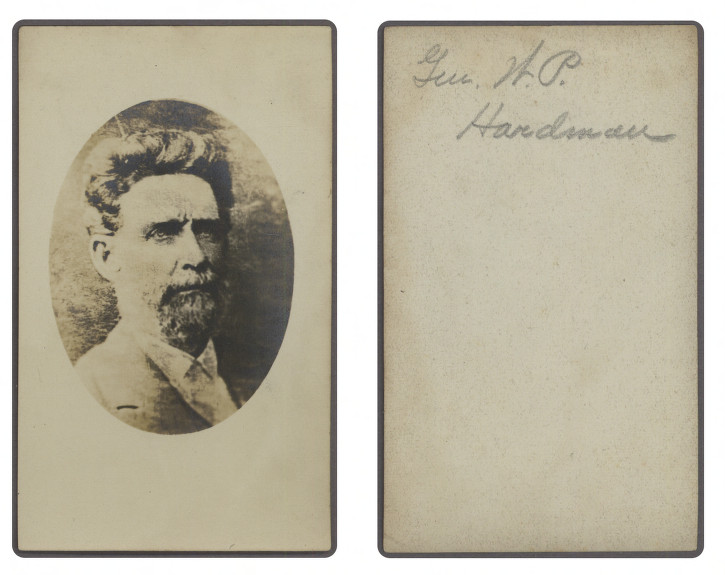
Hardeman 1870–1875.

Hardeman fled to Mexico at the end of the war but soon returned to become a planter in Texas. In 1874 he began to serve as sergeant-at-arms of the Texas House of Representatives and then as inspector of railroads. In the later years of his life, Hardeman was superintendent of public buildings and grounds at Austin, Texas. This job included supervision of the Texas Confederate Soldiers' Home.

William Polk Hardeman died April 8, 1898, at Austin, Texas and is buried in the Texas State Cemetery at Austin.

== See also ==
- List of American Civil War generals (Confederate)
