= Nicholas Perkins III =

American attorney (1779–1848)

Nicholas "Bigbee" Perkins III
- Born: 1779
- Died: 1848 (aged 68–69)
- Burial place: Williamson County, Tennessee
- Military career
- Allegiance: United States
- Branch: Mississippi Territory Militia
- Rank: Major

Nicholas "Bigbee" Perkins III (1779–1848) was an attorney, federal land agent, and territorial militia officer who played a leading role in the 1807 arrest of Aaron Burr in the Mississippi Territory, now Wakefield, Alabama. Perkins is known for identifying Burr and, along with Edmund P. Gaines, arresting the former Vice-President. Perkins subsequently escorted Burr to Washington, D.C., and testified at his trial.

Perkins was later the owner of Montpier, built during 1821 and 1822. At the time of the 1820 census, there were three men named Nicholas Perkins in Williamson County, Tennessee, all slave owners, possessed of title to 44 people, 49 people, and 61 people.

== See also ==
- Thomas Hardeman (1750–1833), maternal uncle
