= Benny Havens =

American tavern keeper (1787–1877)

Benjamin J. Havens
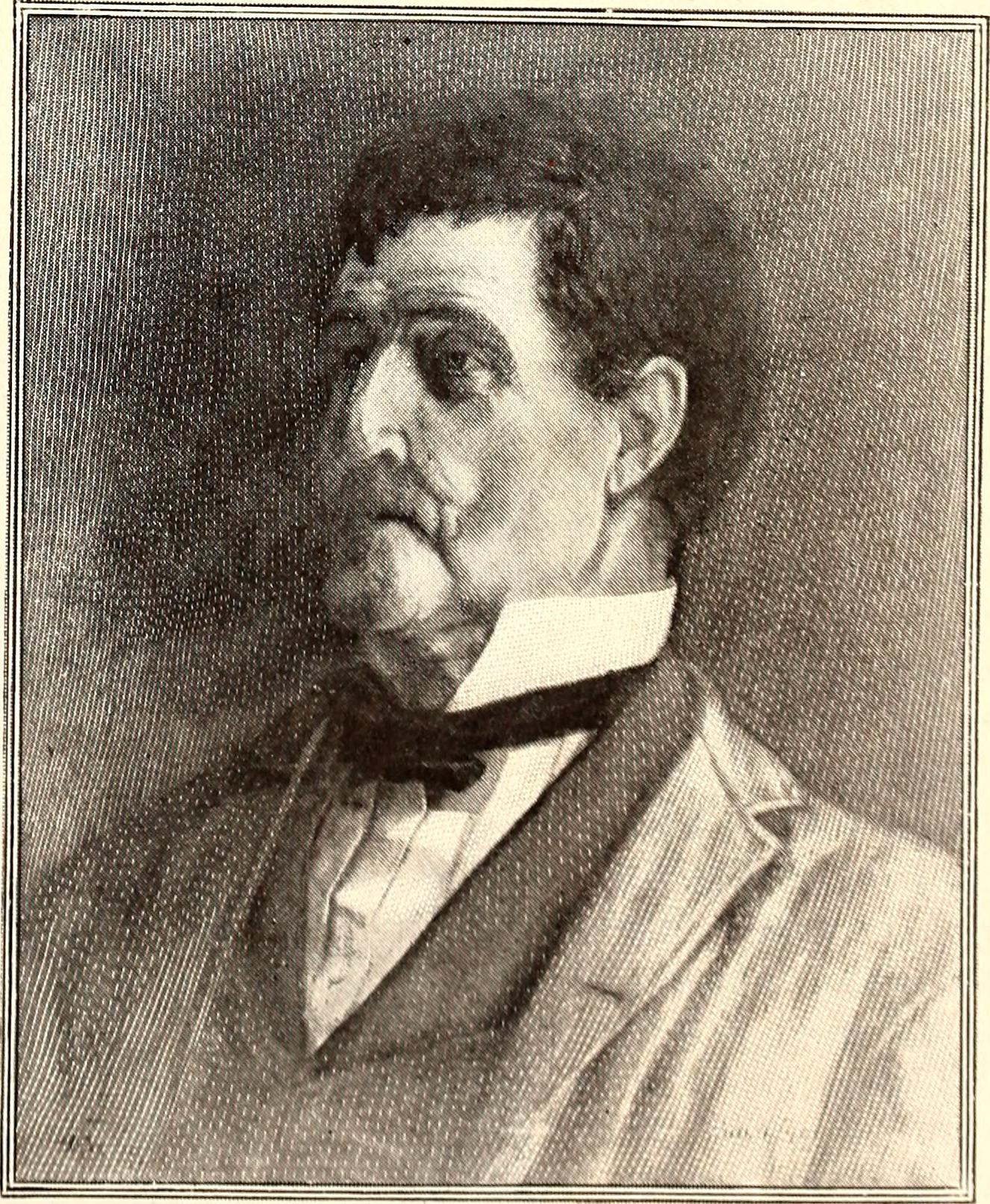
- From a painting by Julian Scott
- Born: January 6, 1787; New Windsor, New York
- Died: May 29, 1877 (aged 90); Highland Falls, New York
- Occupation: Tavernkeeper
- Spouse: Letitia Stuyvesant

Benjamin J. "Benny" Havens (January 6, 1787 – May 29, 1877) was a 19th-century American tavernkeeper active at the United States Military Academy at West Point.

Havens was a soldier and fought in the War of 1812.

Havens ran multiple taverns that were frequented by West Point cadets, providing food, alcohol (including flip), and genial atmosphere. Many of these cadets went on to become notable figures including Civil War generals. Havens operated out of a cottage on campus grounds.

In August 1825, Jefferson Davis became one of the first West Point cadets to be court-martialed for drinking at Benny Havens' tavern. In August 1826, Davis nearly died after falling off a cliff exiting Havens' tavern, and spent months in the hospital.

Havens is known to have supplied some of the whiskey involved in the 1826 Eggnog Riot of West Point cadets. In 1832, he was expelled from the campus of the Academy, compelling his move down the Hudson River from West Point to Buttermilk Falls.

During Edgar Allan Poe's time as a West Point cadet in 1830–31, he referred to Benny Havens as "the only congenial soul in this God-forsaken place".

== Legacy ==
Lieutenant Lucius O'Brien and Ripley A. Arnold wrote a song in Winter of 1839–40, Benny Havens, Oh!, to the air of The Wearing of the Green. Additional verses were added to the song over time to reflect events including O'Brien's 1841 death in the Second Seminole War, the Mexican–American War, the American Civil War, the 1866 death of General Winfield Scott, and Custer's Last Stand.

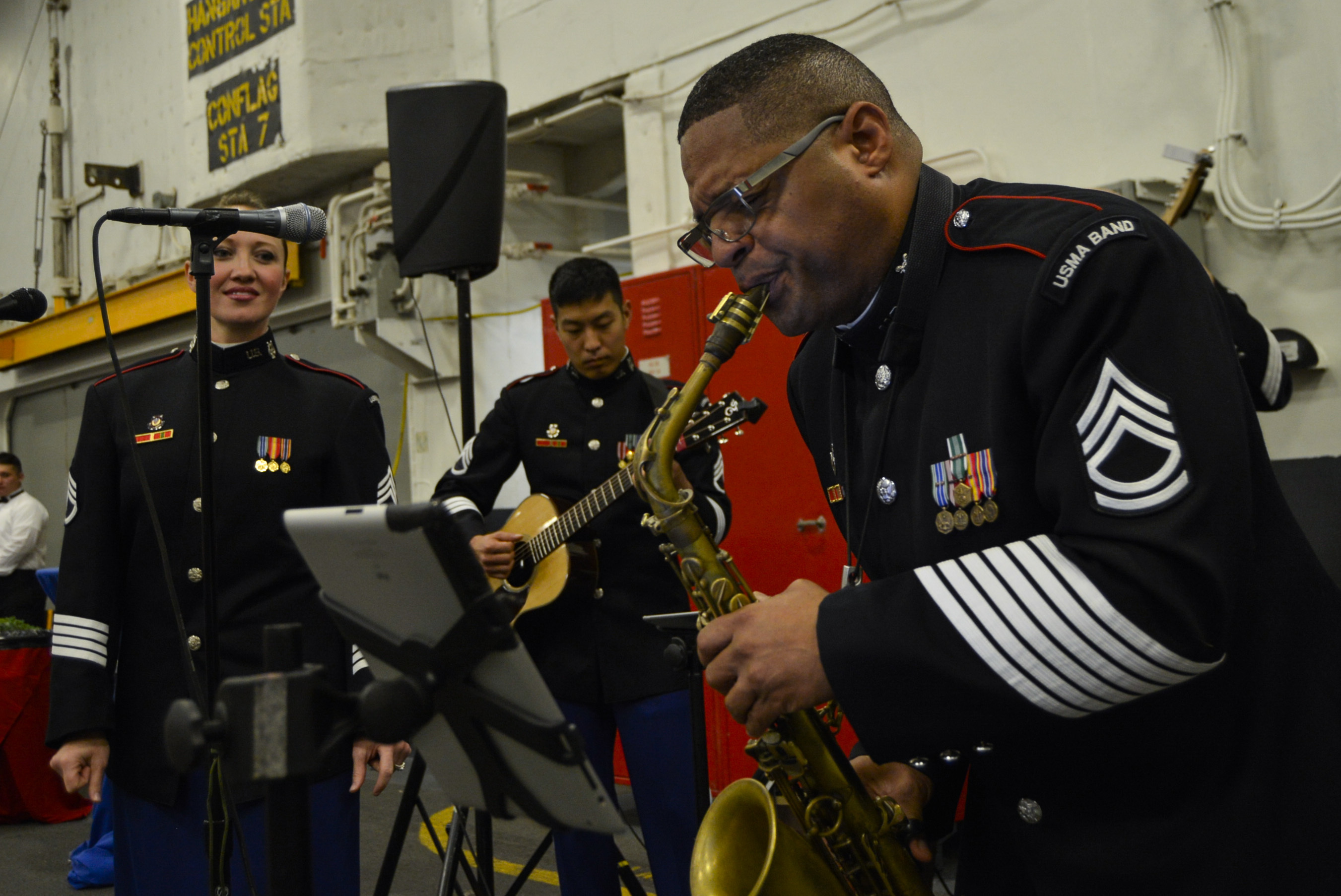
Benny Havens Band in 2016

An ensemble of the West Point Band, the "Benny Havens Band", is named after him.

The Benny Havens Pub & Restaurant in Highland Falls is named after him.

Havens was portrayed by Joe Brown Jr. in the 1942 film Ten Gentlemen from West Point and Scott Anderson in the 2022 film The Pale Blue Eye.
