= Ten Gentlemen from West Point =

1942 film by Henry Hathaway

- Directed by: Henry Hathaway
- Written by: George Seaton (additional dialogue by)
- Screenplay by: Richard Maibaum
- Story by: Malvin Wald
- Produced by: William Perlberg
- Starring: George Montgomery; Maureen O'Hara; John Sutton
- Cinematography: Leon Shamroy
- Edited by: James B. Clark
- Music by: Alfred Newman
- Color process: Black and white
- Production company: 20th Century Fox
- Distributed by: 20th Century Fox
- Release date: June 26, 1942
- Running time: 103 minutes
- Country: United States
- Language: English
- Budget: $1,174,500
- Box office: $1 million (US rentals) $1,684,800 (worldwide)

Ten Gentlemen from West Point is a 1942 American Western film directed by Henry Hathaway and starring George Montgomery, Maureen O'Hara and John Sutton. Its cinematography was nominated for an Academy Award in 1943. George Montgomery replaced John Payne who was suffering an emotional upset at the time. The story tell a fictional story of the first class of the United States Military Academy in the early 1800s.

== Plot ==
In the early 19th century, after a heated congressional debate, the United States Military Academy at West Point opens despite some doubting its worth - including the officer in charge, Major Sam Carter.

A number of men enlist in the first class, including rich Howard Shelton who arrived with his valet, Kentucky backwoodsman Joe Dawson and also a cadet who is trying to regain his family's honour because he happens to be a nephew of the American traitor Benedict Arnold. The men are initially antagonistic towards each other, especially when Joe falls for Howard's fiancé, Carolyn Brainbridge.

The men take part in the war against Tecumseh with William Henry Harrison.

Towards the end of the film, Major Sam Carter, mentions the names (which include images) of some of the real historical cadets who passed through the academy, including "cadets" Ulysses S. Grant, George Armstrong Custer and Douglas MacArthur.

== Cast ==
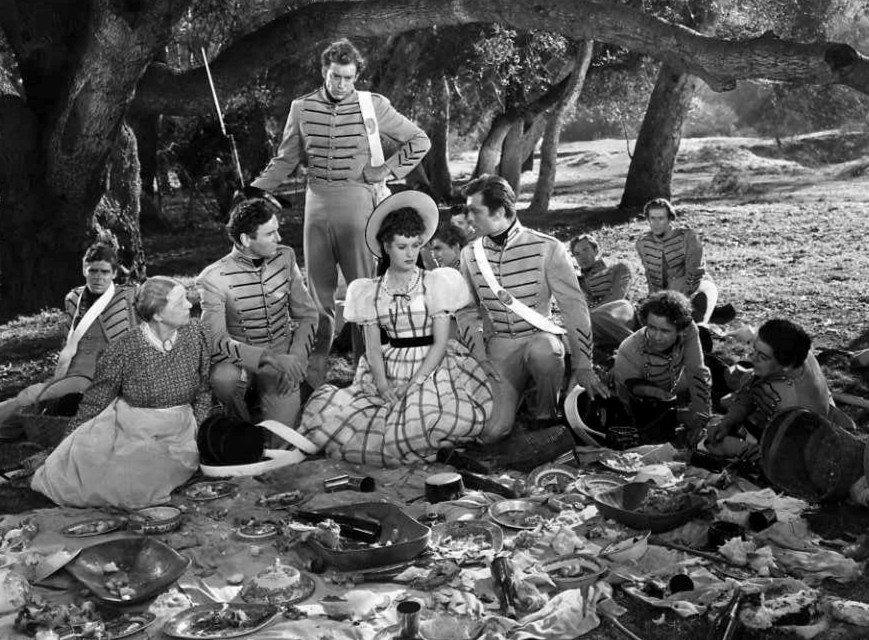
Scene from Ten Gentlemen from West Point

- George Montgomery as Joe Dawson
- Maureen O'Hara as Carolyn Brainbridge
- John Sutton as Howard Shelton
- Laird Cregar as Maj. Sam Carter
- Shepperd Strudwick as Henry Clay (as John Shepperd)
- Victor Francen as Florimond Massey
- Harry Davenport as Bane
- Ward Bond as Sgt. Scully
- Douglass Dumbrille as Gen. William Henry Harrison
- Ralph Byrd as Maloney
- Joe Brown Jr. as Benny Havens
- David Bacon as Shippen
- Esther Dale as Mrs. Thompson
- Richard Derr as Chester
- Louis Jean Heydt as Jared Danforth
- Stanley Andrews as Captain Sloane
- James Flavin as Captain Luddy
- Edna Mae Jones as Letty
- Charles Trowbridge as Senate president
- Tully Marshall as Grandpa
- Edwin Maxwell as Sen. John Randolph
- Uno as Old Put (dog)
- Edward Fielding as William Eustis
- Morris Ankrum as Wood
- Selmer Jackson as Sersen
- Noble Johnson as Tecumseh
- Eddie Dunn as O'Toole
- Frank Ferguson as Alden Brown

== Production ==
The film was originally called School for Soldiers. It was meant to star Tyrone Power, then was given to Henry Fonda and John Payne. Henry Hathaway signed to direct and Ben Hecht was bought on to rewrite the script. Eventually Fonda and Payne withdrew and were replaced by George Montgomery and Randolph Scott. Maureen O'Hara and Victor Mature were meant to play other roles. Eventually John Payne replaced Randolph Scott - but then John Sutton replaced Payne.

The costumes were designed by Dolly Tree.

== Reception ==
The film recorded a loss of $89,000.
