= Wakefield, Alabama =

Ghost town in southern Alabama, United States

- Ghost town
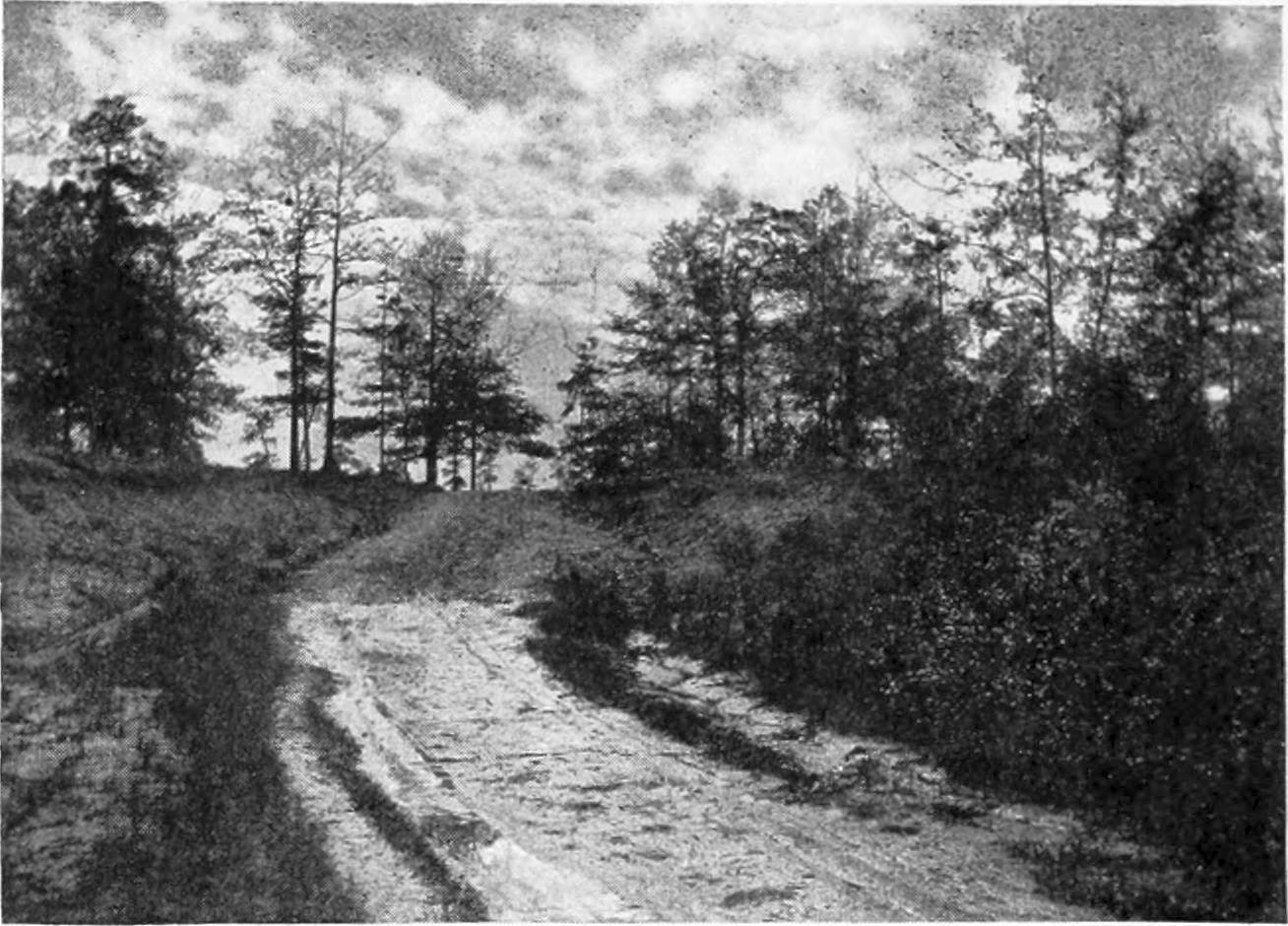
- A 1904 photo of the place Burr was captured

- Location of Wakefield in Alabama
- Coordinates: 31°22′57″N 88°00′30″W
- Country: United States
- State: Alabama
- County: Washington
- Time zone: UTC-6 (Central (CST))
  - Summer (DST): UTC-5 (CDT)

Wakefield is a ghost town in Washington County, Alabama, United States, most famous as the place where former vice president Aaron Burr was arrested in 1807.

== History ==
Wakefield was in a bend of the Tombigbee River near present-day McIntosh Bluff. The settlement was named by territorial judge Harry Toulmin after Oliver Goldsmith's novel The Vicar of Wakefield. Wakefield was the county seat of Washington County from 1805 to 1809.

The arrest of Aaron Burr took place in February 1807. Fleeing from an arrest order issued by President Thomas Jefferson after being found innocent four times, on his way to Spanish West Florida, Burr was spotted by federal land agent Major Nicholas Perkins III who reported the sighting to U.S. Army Lieutenant Edmund P. Gaines. Gaines arrested Burr on February 19 near Wakefield, two miles below Colonel Henson's, and detained him at Fort Stoddert. Gaines and Perkins later testified at Burr's trial, which ended in acquittal.

A marker placed by the Alabama Historical Association commemorates the Burr capture.
