= Thomas Hardeman (Tennessee politician) =

Tennessee businessman (1750–1833)

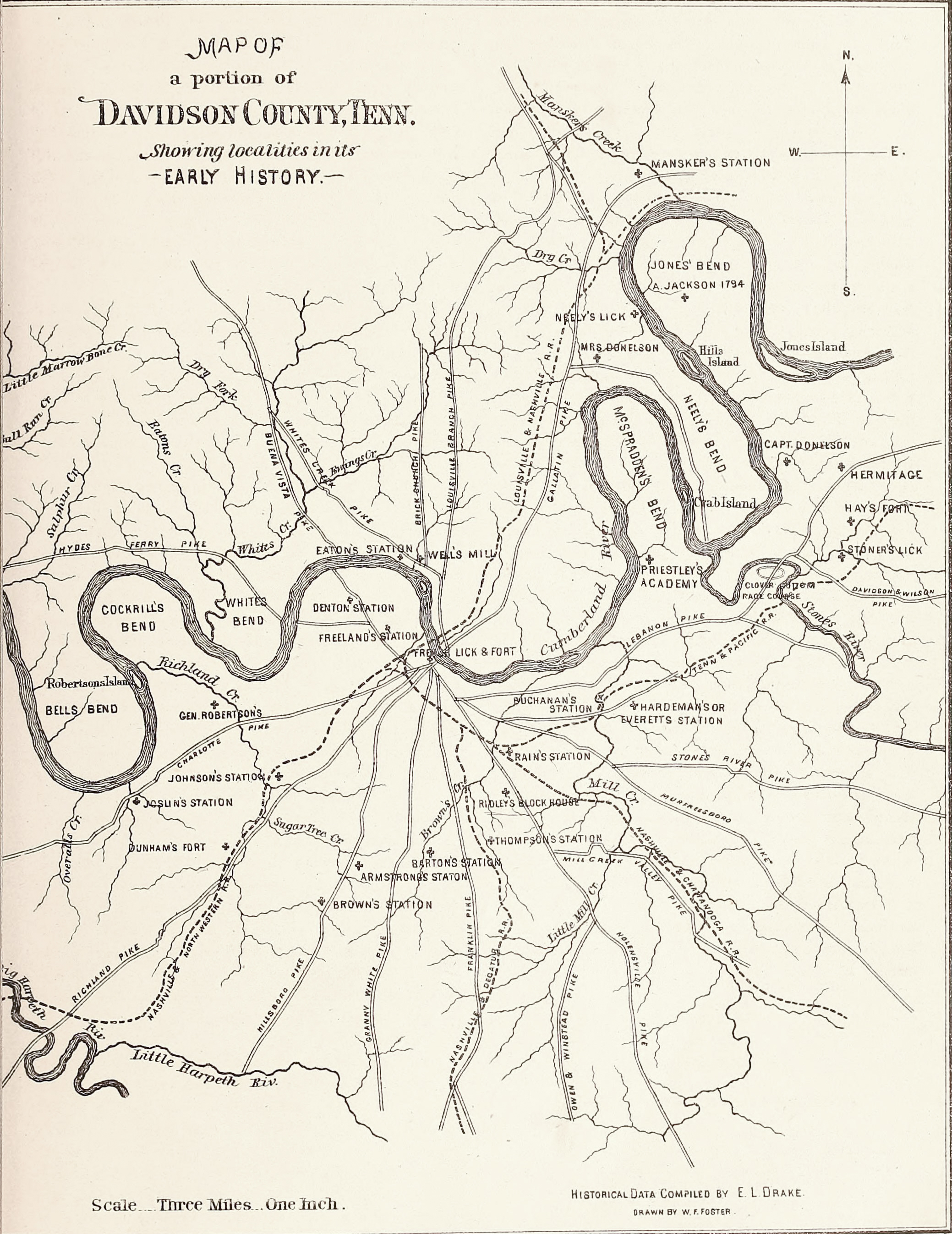
- Hardeman's Station near Stones River Pike in 18th-century Nashville
- Born: January 8, 1750; Albemarle County, Virginia
- Died: June 14, 1833 (aged 83); Williamson County, Tennessee

Thomas Hardeman (January 8, 1750–June 14, 1833), often deemed Capt. Hardeman in documents, was a businessman and pioneer settler of Tennessee. He was a participant in North Carolina political conventions in the early republic period of the United States and served in the Tennessee legislature. He seems to have been involved in land speculation in Tennessee and Louisiana. He had a large number of children, and several of his sons were also pioneers of the American frontier.

== Life and career ==
Hardeman was originally from Virginia, born in Albemarle County, the second of nine children of Dorothy Edwards and John Hardeman. In 1768 he joined a group of long hunters exploring past the Proclamation Line into the Holston River and Powell River valleys, "as far west as the Cumberland Basin and the site of the present Nashville, shooting buffalo and quite possibly eyeing this fertile land with a view to future claims." Later Hardeman came to Tennessee permanently with his father John Hardeman. In the 1770s he farmed in the vicinity of the Dan River. In the same decade the Holston River valley offered "the promise of fertile land and freedom from oppression" attracted "increasing numbers of ex-tenants, ex-Regulators, and other homeseekers to the Watauga, Nolichucky, and nearby regions," including the Hardemans, who came and went a couple of times under threat of attack by the resident Cherokee. He was involved in fighting both the British and the Indians; per California historian and descendant Thomas Perkins Hardeman, "Thomas Hardeman was probably in William Bean's militia company which served with Colonel Evan Shelby in the campaign against the Chickamaugas in 1779. A few months later, Hardeman commanded an assemblage of Watauga woodsmen against a group of Cherokees in the Nickajack area. After this campaign, Thomas was known as 'Captain,' although his militia rank was apparently lieutenant at the time of the battle of King's Mountain."

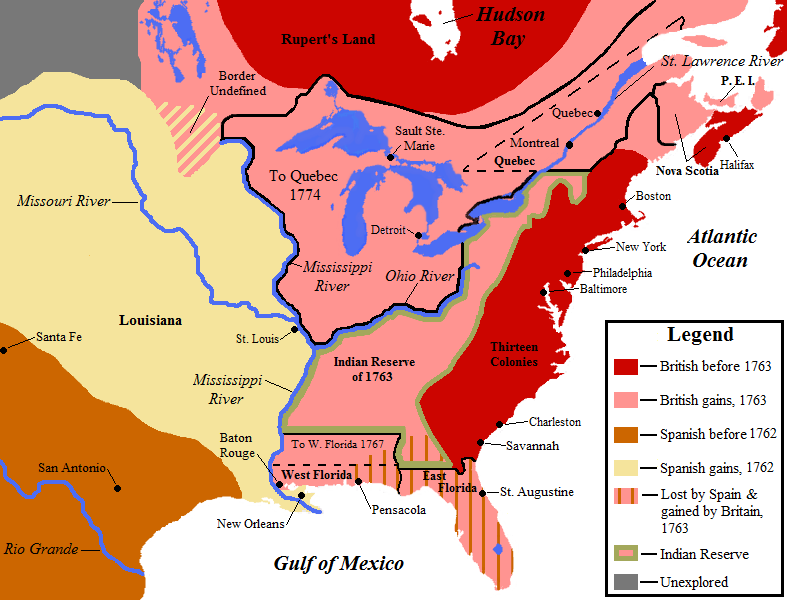
North America, 1762–1783

By 1783 he owned 325 acres in the Wautagua-Holston watershed, which is now west North Carolina and east Tennessee. In 1784, he sold his Wautagua land and "as part payment for his military service to North Carolina, Hardeman secured title to a 640-acre section on the Little Harpeth River. Lands near French Lick were so cheap that on the trip he was able to pick up, for a small consideration, another 640 acres, and on this tract near the Cumberland River he selected a cabin site." In addition to these parcels, deed papers and entries in deed books "he acquired at least 5,360 acres between 1784 and 1803." He was eventually settled near French Lick and brought his wife their several children to the west, and in addition to pioneering and farming, "Captain Thomas Hardeman mentioned taking part in many Indian campaigns. He served as a spy or ranger, scouting positions and movements of the enemy and carrying messages to and from the outposts."

After the Louisiana Purchase he bought tracts in the Opelousas and Attakapas districts of Orleans Territory.

He later bought land in Missouri and moved across the river.

Hardeman died in Williamson County, Tennessee.

== Public service ==
Thomas Hardeman was a grand juror and tax assessor in Washington County, North Carolina.

He was a delegate from Davidson County for the 1788 North Carolina Convention debating the ratification of the U.S. Constitution, along with Thomas Evans, William Dobbins, William Donaldson, and Robert Weakley. He was elected to the 1788 session of the North Carolina House of Commons at Fayetteville. He was elected as a delegate to represent Davidson County in the House of Representatives of the Territory Southwest of the River Ohio. He later served on the territorial legislative council.

He was a delegate to the 1796 Tennessee constitutional convention, along with Andrew Jackson, Joel Lewis, John McNairy, and James Robertson. In August 1797 he was elected to represent Davidson County in the Tennessee state senate. He resigned in November 1798 due to his wife's death.

== Personal life ==
In 1770 Hardeman married Mary Perkins, the daughter of Bethenia Hardin and Nicholas Perkins I. Mary was a sister of Peter Perkins, and the aunt of Nicholas Perkins III. The year after she died in 1798, he remarried, to Mary's widowed sister Susan. Susan died in 1815, after a long illness.

- Nicholas Perkins Hardeman (1772–1818) m. Ann Neely
- Anna Hardeman (1774–1833) m. Seth Lewis
- John Hardeman (1776–1829) m1. Lucretia Nash, m2. Nancy Knox
- Constantine "Constant" Hardeman (1778–1850) m1. Sally J. Marr, m2. Mary Little
- Eleazer Hardeman (b. 1779) m. Elizabeth Foster
- Julia Ann Hardeman (1782–1860) m1. Davis, m2. Thomas Bacon
- Peter Hardeman (1784–1820) m. Susan Stone
- Dorothy Hardeman (1786–1843) m. George Burnett
- Thomas Jones Hardeman (1788–1854) m1. Mary Polk, m2. Mrs. Eliza (DeWitt) Hamilton
- Blackstone Hardeman (b. 1790) m. Anna Bunch
- Elizabeth Hardeman (1791–1870) m1. Glen Owen, m2. Dr. Reese Corsine
- Bailey Hardeman (1795–1836) m. Rebecca Amanda F. Wilson
- Franklin Hardeman (b. 1796) died in infancy
- Pitt Hardeman (b. 1798), died in infancy

== See also ==
- Seth Lewis, son-in-law
- Nicholas Perkins III, cousin-in-law

== Sources ==
- Cheathem, Mark R. (2014). Andrew Jackson, Southerner. Baton Rouge, Louisiana: Louisiana State University Press. ISBN 978-0-8071-5099-3. LCCN 2012049695. OCLC 858995561. Project MUSE book 26506.
- Hardeman, Nicholas Perkins (1977). Wilderness Calling: The Hardeman Family in the American Westward Movement, 1750–1900. Knoxville, Tennessee: University of Tennessee Press. ISBN 978-0-87049-194-8. LCCN 76000980. OCLC 2005980 – via Internet Archive.
