= Andrews Chapel (McIntosh, Alabama) =

Historic church in Alabama, United States

- McIntosh Log Church
- U.S. National Register of Historic Places
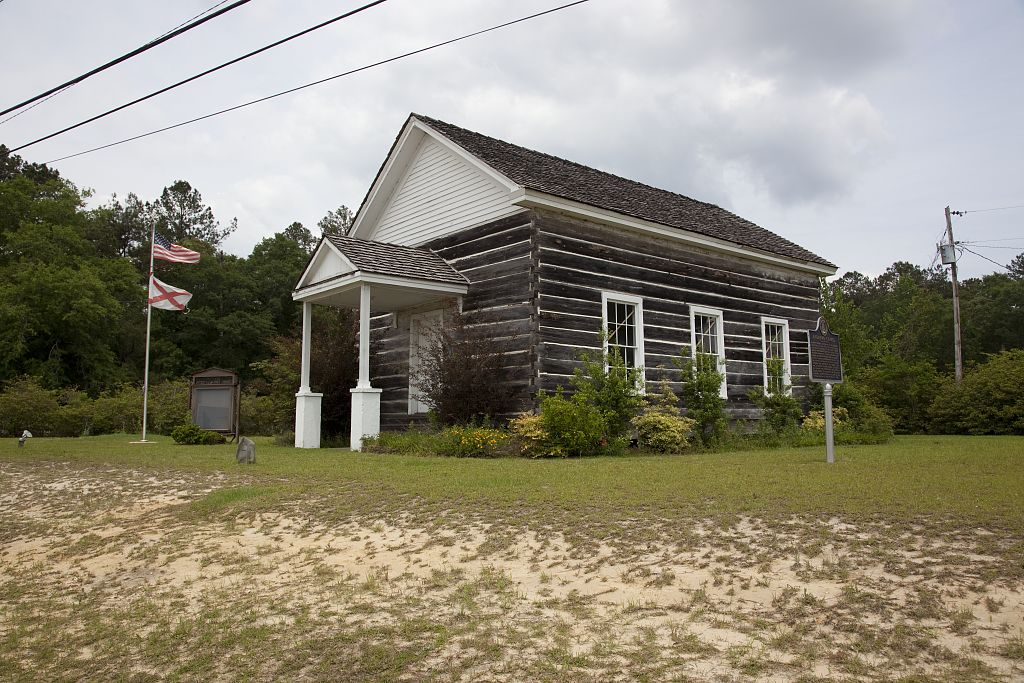
- The chapel in 2010

- Location within Alabama Location within the United States
- Nearest city: McIntosh, Alabama
- Coordinates: 31°15′44″N 88°1′49″W
- Area: less than one acre
- Built: 1860
- NRHP reference No.: 74000439
- Added to NRHP: November 20, 1974

Andrews Chapel, also known as the McIntosh Log Church, is a historic Methodist church building in McIntosh, Alabama. It is one of only a few remaining log churches in the state. It had its beginning in 1860 when John C. Rush and his wife donated land for the church to the Methodist McIntosh community. The church was built before the year ended. It was named for James Osgood Andrew, a bishop in the Methodist Episcopal Church, South.

The squared-log building features square notched corners, and a wood shingle roof. A new church building was built in 1952 adjacent to the chapel. The chapel was listed on the National Register of Historic Places on November 20, 1974.
