= Seth Lewis (judge) =

Mississippi Territory and Louisiana judge (1764–1848)

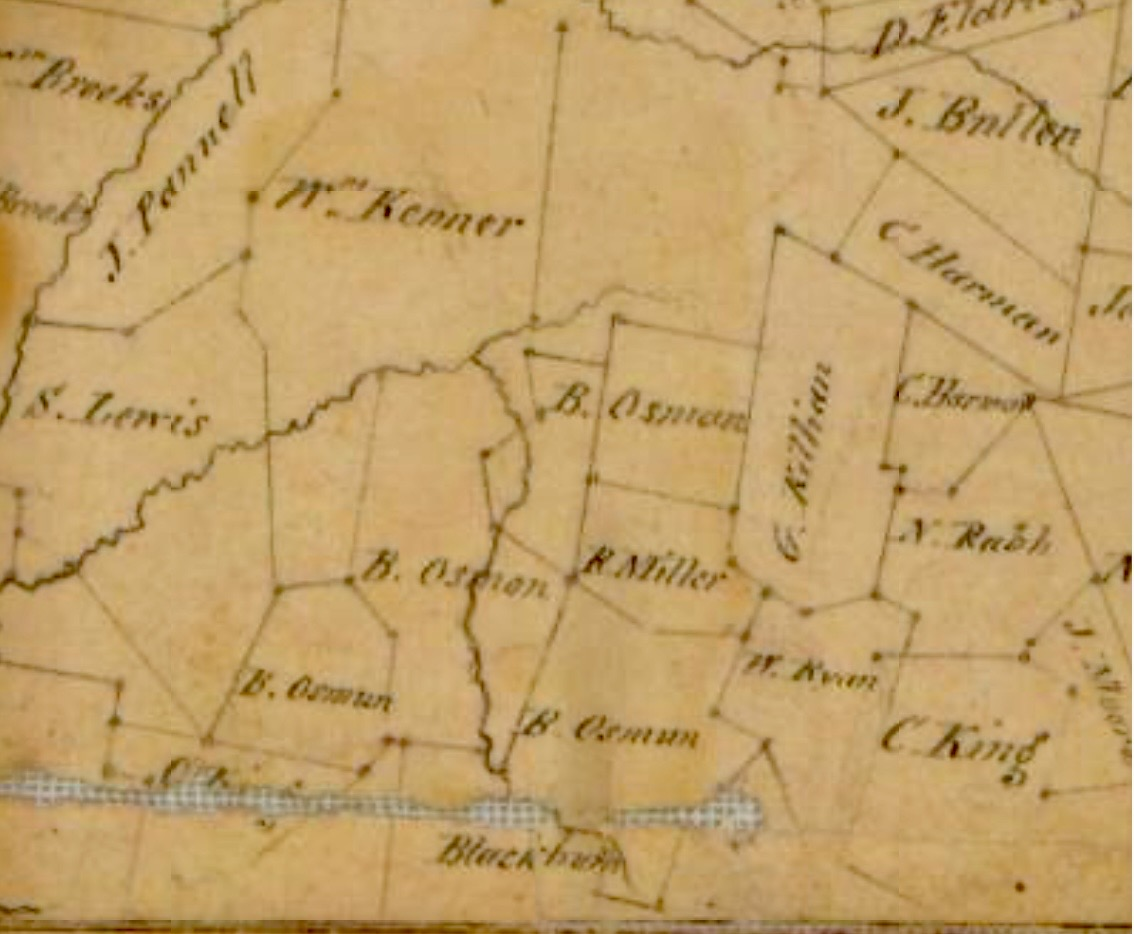
- S. Lewis property, Adams County, Mississippi Territory, 1810
- Born: October 14, 1764; Massachusetts
- Died: November 15, 1848 (aged 84); Pineville, Louisiana
- Occupations: Lawyer, judge, state legislator, plantation owner

Seth Lewis (October 14, 1764–November 15, 1848) was an American lawyer and judge. He served as a state legislator in Tennessee, and as a judge in Mississippi Territory and Louisiana.

== Early life and family ==
Lewis was the son of Ethan Lewis and Sybil Parmelee, and was said to have been born in Massachusetts. He was brought to the lower Mississippi River valley by his parents in about 1774. The family was originally from Connecticut and settled along the Big Black River. Descendants represented that they had come to Mississippi as part of the Lyman colony. The parents died of illness shortly after arrival, and the surviving children relocated to Iberville on Bayou Manchac, or to Plaquemines, under the guardianship of their oldest brother Daniel Lewis, who then drowned in the Mississippi River while traveling to New Orleans on business.

The surviving orphaned children were then apparently on their own, with Seth Lewis doing whatever work he could find to survive, including a stint as a tanner and shoemaker, "until the year 1790, when being in Nashville, he contracted a friendship with Andrew Jackson and Col. Josiah Love, who persuaded him to study law." One of his brothers, Archibald Lewis, became "presiding judge of the Court of Common Pleas of Adams County, Mississippi." Another sister, Lavinia, married late in life to Natchez planter Robert Ford.

== Career ==
From 1790 to 1793 Lewis read law with Josiah Love in Nashville. Love had the largest law practice in Nashville and frequently partnered with Andrew Jackson and Howell Tatum, and following his death in 1793, Jackson "apparently assumed much of Love's practice." Lewis was admitted to practice in various Tennessee courts beginning in 1795. Seth Lewis appears frequently in the accounts of Andrew Jackson's store in Nashville in 1795.

In 1793 Lewis married 19-year-old Nancy Hardeman, one of the 15 children of Mary Perkins and Thomas Hardeman of Williamson County. One of his sisters, Sarah Lewis, married U.S. Army officer Isaac Guion. In 1794 he was commissioned a justice of the Davidson County Court of Pleas and Quarter Sessions.

In 1796, along with Robert Weakley, Lewis represented Davidson County in the first session of the Tennessee House of Representatives. In 1798 he was admitted to the federal bar of Tennessee.

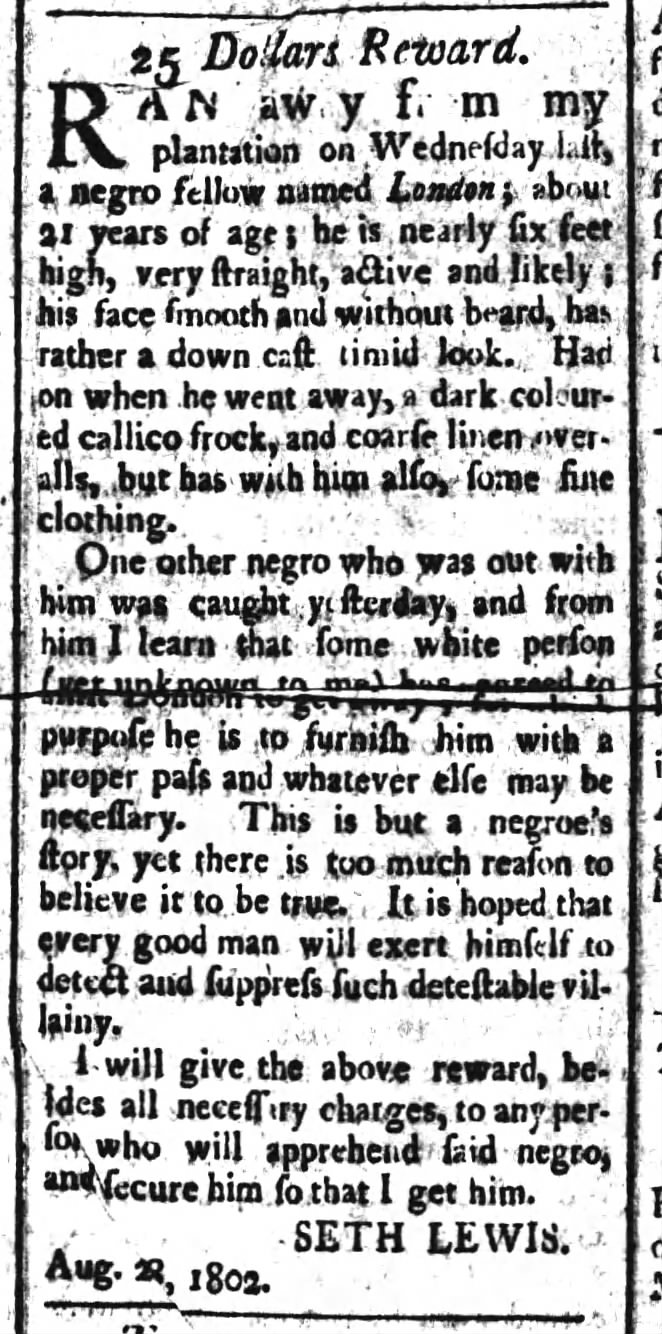
Seth Lewis (judge) seeking 21-year-old London, an escaped man whom he sought to re-enslave ("25 Dollars Reward" Mississippi Herald and Natchez Gazette, September 28, 1802)

In 1800 John Adams appointed Lewis to be Chief Justice of Mississippi Territory. Lewis came to Mississippi with his wife and several children and was licensed to practice and admitted to the Mississippi bar in July 1801. However, according to a history of the bench and bar of Mississippi, "The governor reported, in February, 1802; 'A violent dispute has arisen between the two houses of assembly and Mr. Lewis, the chief justice of this territory, who has many friends. Upon the petition of some citizens, the assembly authorized the taking of depositions as to the official conduct of the judge, with a view, I suppose, of exhibiting to Congress charges against the judge.' Among the old documents of the Department of Archives and History is a resolution, of both houses, providing that John Ellis, William Vousdan, and George Fitzgerald, attend at the government house, 'to take the depositions of sundry persons respecting the different complaints of Col. Thomas Green, Nathaniel Tomlinson and others against Governor Sargent and certain judges, by them complained of by petition respecting undue administration.'" Lewis was caught up in larger power struggles, between the Federalists and the Democrat-Republicans, and under attack from Cato West and allies. According to one history of lawfare in territorial Mississippi, Lewis was an early "casualty of the political war. Some of the lawyers who were unhappy with Claiborne had complained about Lewis. The legislators joined the lawyers and threatened to impeach Lewis." As such, Lewis resigned as chief Justice in April 1803.

In April 1807 Lewis was commissioned to be attorney general for Adams, Jefferson, Wilkinson, and Claiborne counties, in Mississippi Territory, because "an act of 1807 required two attorneys-general, east and west of Pearl river. Poindexter resigned early in 1807 to go to Congress, and was succeeded west of Pearl, by Seth Lewis, ex-judge. Upon the resignation of the latter, William B. Shields was appointed in September, 1808." As part of a larger political purge, Governor Robert Williams ordered Lewis "to bring libel suits against George Poindexter, Col. Joshua Baker who was president of the legislative council, and printer John Shaw."

In 1810, Lewis "removed to Attakapas, La., (having received the appointment of Parish Judge,) where he purchased a large tract of land, and engaged in planting." His ownership of lands in Louisiana was not solitary enterprise but conducted in some company with his Hardeman brothers-in-law, John Hardeman, who "acquired property below Pointe Coupee near Baton Rouge," Thomas Hardeman, Peter Hardeman, and Blackstone Hardeman, "with much financial aid from old Thomas Hardeman, operated a kind of annex to their Tennessee enterprises in Attakapas and Opelousas, Louisiana." Lewis initially ran a cotton plantation but when that failed he transitioned into sugar.

Lewis was appointed the judge of St. Martin Parish and served until 1812. The following year, Lewis was appointed the Judge of the Fifth Judicial District of Louisiana which seat he held for 27 years until 1840, and then "after acting as Presidential elector for Louisiana, he retired to private life." According to the Dictionary of Louisiana Biography, "during the codification mania in 1820–1825, he attacked the penal code proposed by Edward Livingston and caused its rejection."

== Death and descendants ==
Lewis' wife, Nancy Hardeman Lewis, died during the cholera epidemic of 1833. He married second Tabitha Wells Cuney, widow of Richmond Cuney. Lewis died at his house at Pineville, in Rapides Parish, in 1848. Lewis and his first wife are buried together at Myrtle Grove Cemetery in Opelousas, St. Landry Parish, Louisiana.

Lewis was first master of a Masonic Lodge in Mississippi. He was buried with Masonic honors.

Among his children with Nancy Hardeman were Seth Lewis Jr., Thomas Hardeman Lewis, and William Brent Lewis. Lewis' grandson James Jackson Lewis cofounded Eunice State Bank and the town of Basile, Louisiana. His grandson Edward Brent Lewis was a "leader of white forces in Opelousas riot of 1868. Helped organize the Opelousas chapter of the White League, and local branch of Knights of the White Camelia."

== See also ==
- Nellie Nugent Somerville
- List of Mississippi Territory judges

== Sources ==
- Ely, James W. Jr.; Brown, Theodore Jr., eds. (1987). Legal Papers of Andrew Jackson. Supplement to the Papers of Andrew Jackson. Knoxville, Tennessee: University of Tennessee Press. ISBN 978-0-87049-355-3. LCCN 82002635. OCLC 17590211.
- Everton, Muriel (May 1, 2010). Libel in Mississippi, 1798–1832. Dissertations (Ph.D. thesis). 949 – via University of Southern Mississippi.
- Hardeman, Nicholas Perkins (1977). Wilderness Calling: The Hardeman Family in the American Westward Movement, 1750–1900. Knoxville, Tennessee: University of Tennessee Press. ISBN 978-0-87049-194-8. LCCN 76000980. OCLC 2005980 – via Internet Archive.
- Jackson, Andrew (1980). Smith, Sam; Owsley, Harriet (eds.). The Papers of Andrew Jackson: Volume I, 1770–1803. University of Tennessee Press. doi:10.7290/utp7943. ISBN 978-0-87049-219-8.
