= William H. C. Bartlett =

American military scholar and professor (1802–1871)

William H. C. Barlett
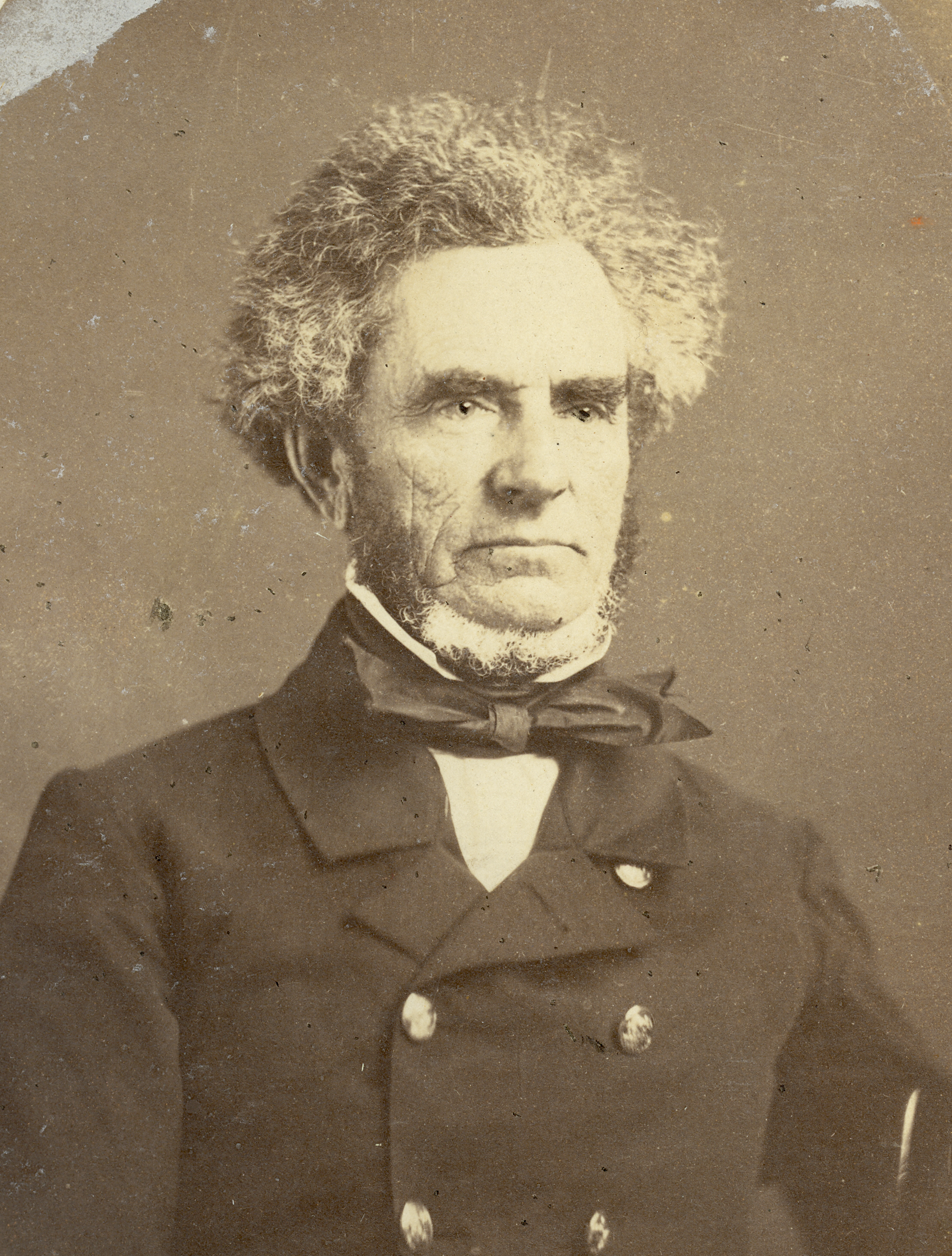
- Born: September 10, 1804; Lancaster County, Pennsylvania, Pennsylvania
- Died: February 11, 1893 (aged 88); Yonkers, New York, New York
- Resting place: West Point Cemetery, West Point, New York
- Education: United States Military Academy
- Occupations: Army engineer and Civil educator Professor
- Spouse: Harriet Whitehorne Bartlett (m. 1830-1893, his death)
- Children: 7
- Military career
- Allegiance: United States
- Branch: United States Army
- Service years: 1826–1836
- Rank: Second Lieutenant
- Unit: United States Army Corps of Engineers

William Holms Chambers Bartlett (September 10, 1804 – February 11, 1893) was an American military engineer and educator, notable as a founding member of the National Academy of Sciences.

== Biography ==
Bartlett was born in Pennsylvania, but moved as an infant to Missouri. He had little formal education prior to his appointment to West Point by Senator Thomas H. Benton in 1822. He graduated at the head of his class as a second lieutenant in the Corps of Engineers in 1826, and remained at West Point for two years afterwards to serve as an Assistant Professor of Engineering.

Bartlett was an expert in the construction of fortifications and was a principal in the construction of Fort Monroe, Virginia, in 1828; and of Fort Adams, Newport, Rhode Island, 1829–1832. In 1836, he became professor of natural and experimental philosophy at West Point, where he continued to teach until retiring from active service in 1871. His oil portrait from that year by Robert Walter Weir is reproduced in West Point's digital art collection.

Bartlett received the degree of A. M. from Princeton in 1837; and of LL. D. from Hobart College (Geneva, N. Y.) in 1847. He was a member of the American Academy of Arts and Sciences (Boston) and of the American Philosophical Society (Philadelphia), and one of the corporators and original members of the National Academy of Sciences in 1863.

After retiring from the Army as a colonel, Bartlett was an actuary for the Mutual Life Insurance Company of New York.
