= McIntosh Bluff =

Bluff in Washington County, Alabama

Coordinates: 31.25717°N 87.98882°W

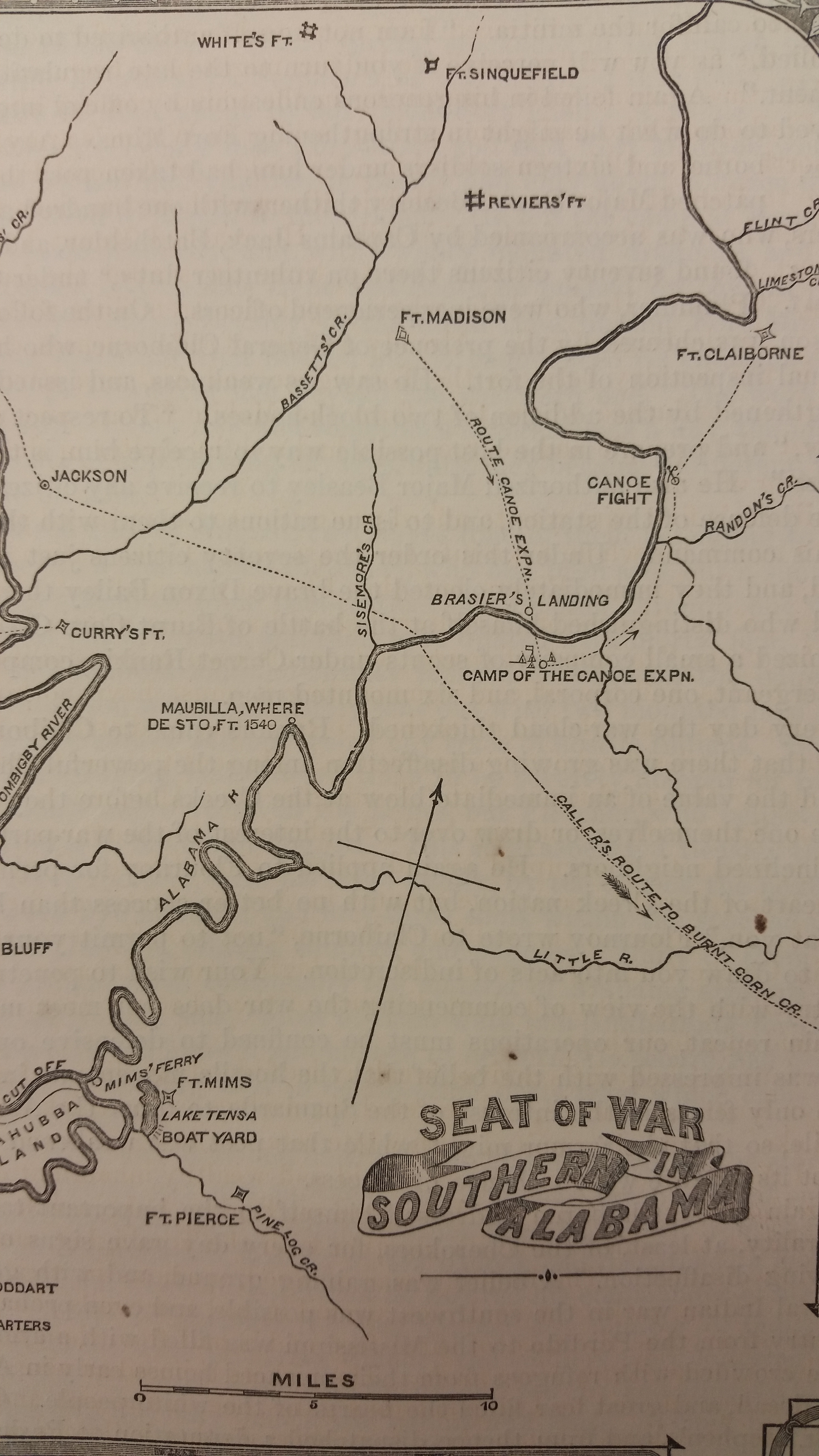
Map of Alabama during the War of 1812. McIntosh Bluff is on the left, north of Ft. Mims.

McIntosh Bluff is a bluff on the Tombigbee River in Washington County, Alabama. The bluff is the original site of the community of McIntosh, which originally went by McIntosh Bluff. McIntosh Bluff was the site of a sawmill, gristmill, and blacksmith shop that were used in the construction of gunboats during the American Civil War.
