= National Register of Historic Places listings in Hardeman County, Tennessee =

Location of Hardeman County in Tennessee

This is a list of the National Register of Historic Places listings in Hardeman County, Tennessee.

This is intended to be a complete list of the properties and districts on the National Register of Historic Places in Hardeman County, Tennessee, United States. Latitude and longitude coordinates are provided for many National Register properties and districts; these locations may be seen together in a map.

There are 12 properties and districts listed on the National Register in the county, including 1 National Historic Landmark. Another property was once listed but has been removed.

Contents: Counties in Tennessee
Anderson – Bedford – Benton – Bledsoe – Blount – Bradley – Campbell – Cannon – Carroll – Carter – Cheatham – Chester – Claiborne – Clay – Cocke – Coffee – Crockett – Cumberland – Davidson – Decatur – DeKalb – Dickson – Dyer – Fayette – Fentress – Franklin – Gibson – Giles – Grainger – Greene – Grundy – Hamblen – Hamilton – Hancock – Hardeman – Hardin – Hawkins – Haywood – Henderson – Henry – Hickman – Houston – Humphreys – Jackson – Jefferson – Johnson – Knox – Lake – Lauderdale – Lawrence – Lewis – Lincoln – Loudon – Macon – Madison – Marion – Marshall – Maury – McMinn – McNairy – Meigs – Monroe – Montgomery – Moore – Morgan – Obion – Overton – Perry – Pickett – Polk – Putnam – Rhea – Roane – Robertson – Rutherford – Scott – Sequatchie – Sevier – Shelby – Smith – Stewart – Sullivan – Sumner – Tipton – Trousdale – Unicoi – Union – Van Buren – Warren – Washington – Wayne – Weakley – White – Williamson – Wilson

This National Park Service list is complete through NPS recent listings posted March 14, 2025.

== Current listings ==
	Name on the Register	Image	Date listed	Location	City or town	Description
1	Allen-White School	Allen-White School	November 9, 2005 (#05001214)	100 Allen Extension St. 35°20′01″N 89°08′51″W	Whiteville	
2	James Monroe Avent House		April 25, 2001 (#01000436)	220 Railroad Ave. 35°09′11″N 89°07′36″W	Hickory Valley	
3	Bills-McNeal Historic District		February 12, 1980 (#80003829)	Irregular pattern along Lafayette, McNeal, Bills, Union, Lauderdale, and Washington Sts. 35°15′11″N 88°59′29″W	Bolivar	
4	Bolivar Court Square Historic District	Bolivar Court Square Historic District	January 10, 1980 (#80003830)	U.S. Route 64 and State Route 125; 35°15′22″N 88°59′13″W	Bolivar	
5	Bolivar-Somerville Stage Road		August 7, 2005 (#05000802)	Herron Dr., Stewart Rd., 4.0 miles southwest of Whiteville; 35°15′02″N 89°11′13″W	Whiteville	Extends into Fayette County
6	Davis Bridge Battlefield	Davis Bridge Battlefield	July 13, 1998 (#97001549)	Roughly along Ripley-Pocahontas and Essary Spring Rds; 35°01′51″N 88°47′44″W	Pocahontas	Extends into Alcorn County, Mississippi
7	Hatchie River Ferry		August 7, 2005 (#05000800)	End of Big Bend Ln, 1.0 mile south of State Route 15; 35°13′27″N 88°55′00″W	Bolivar	
8	North Main Street Historic District		March 20, 1980 (#80003831)	N. Main, Sycamore, Jefferson, Washing, and Water Sts. 35°15′36″N 88°59′18″W	Bolivar	
9	Pocahontas School	Pocahontas School	July 19, 2007 (#07000706)	22555 State Route 57; 35°02′52″N 88°48′17″W	Pocahontas	
10	Robertson Family Farm		November 8, 2007 (#07001164)	2715 Newsom Rd. 35°20′42″N 89°07′30″W	Whiteville	
11	United Sons and Daughters of Charity Lodge Hall		November 9, 2005 (#05001222)	322 W. McNeal St. 35°15′22″N 88°59′04″W	Bolivar	
12	Western State Hospital Historic District		June 25, 1987 (#87001057)	U.S. Route 64; 35°16′35″N 88°59′37″W	Bolivar	

== Former listing ==
	Name on the Register	Image	Date listed	Date removed	Location	City or town	Description
1	Campbell House		August 6, 1975 (#75001758)	May 21, 1986	607 W. Market St.	Bolivar	

== See also ==
- List of National Historic Landmarks in Tennessee
- National Register of Historic Places listings in Tennessee
