= Tennessee House of Representatives 94th district =

State legislative district in Tennessee

Tennessee's 94th State House of Representatives district
- Map of Tennessee House districts with the 94th District shaded in red
Representative
| Ron Gant; R–Piperton |
since 2017
- Demographics: 74.4% White; 17.5% Black; 3.1% Hispanic; 0.6% Asian; 4% Multiracial
- Population (2024): 73,083

The Tennessee House of Representatives 94th district is one of the 99 legislative districts in the lower house of the Tennessee General Assembly. The district is located in West Tennessee and covers all of Fayette, McNairy, and part of Hardeman counties. The district includes Oakland, Somerville, Piperton, Middleton, Selmer and Adamsville. Ron Gant has represented the district since 2017.

== Demographics ==
The Tennessee Comptroller estimates the population as of 2024 at 73,083.

- 74.4% of the district is White
- 17.5% of the district is Black
- 3.1% of the district is Hispanic
- 0.6% of the district is Asian
- 0.3% of the district is some other race alone
- 4% of the district is Two or more races

Detailed demographic information is also available through Census Reporter.

== History ==
The 88th Tennessee General Assembly was the first in which all districts were numbered. At this time, the 94th district was in Shelby County. From the 103rd to the 107th GAs, it was made up of Fayette and parts of Hardeman and Tipton counties. Since the 108th GA, it has been made up of Fayette, McNairy, and part of Hardeman counties.

== List of Representatives ==
| Representative | Party | Years of Service | General Assembly | Hometown |
|---|---|---|---|---|
| Ron Gant | Republican | 2017-present | 110th-114th | Piperton |
| Jamie H. Jenkins | Republican | 2016 | 109th | Somerville |
| Leigh Wilburn | Republican | 2015 | 109th | Somerville |
| Barrett Rich | Republican | 2009-2014 | 106th-108th | Somerville |
| Dolores Gresham | Republican | 2003-2008 | 103rd-105th | Somerville |
| Larry Scroggs | Republican | 1997-2002 | 100th-102nd | Germantown |
| David A. Shirley | Republican | 1993-1996 | 98th-99th | Germantown |
| Richard H. Nuber | Republican | 1989-1992 | 96th-97th | Germantown |
| W. A. Nance | Republican | 1983-1988 | 93rd-95th | Germantown |
| Brad Martin | Republican | 1975-1982 | 89th-92nd | Memphis |
| W. K. Weldon | Republican | 1973-1974 | 88th | Memphis |
