= Johnny Shaw =

American politician (born 1942)

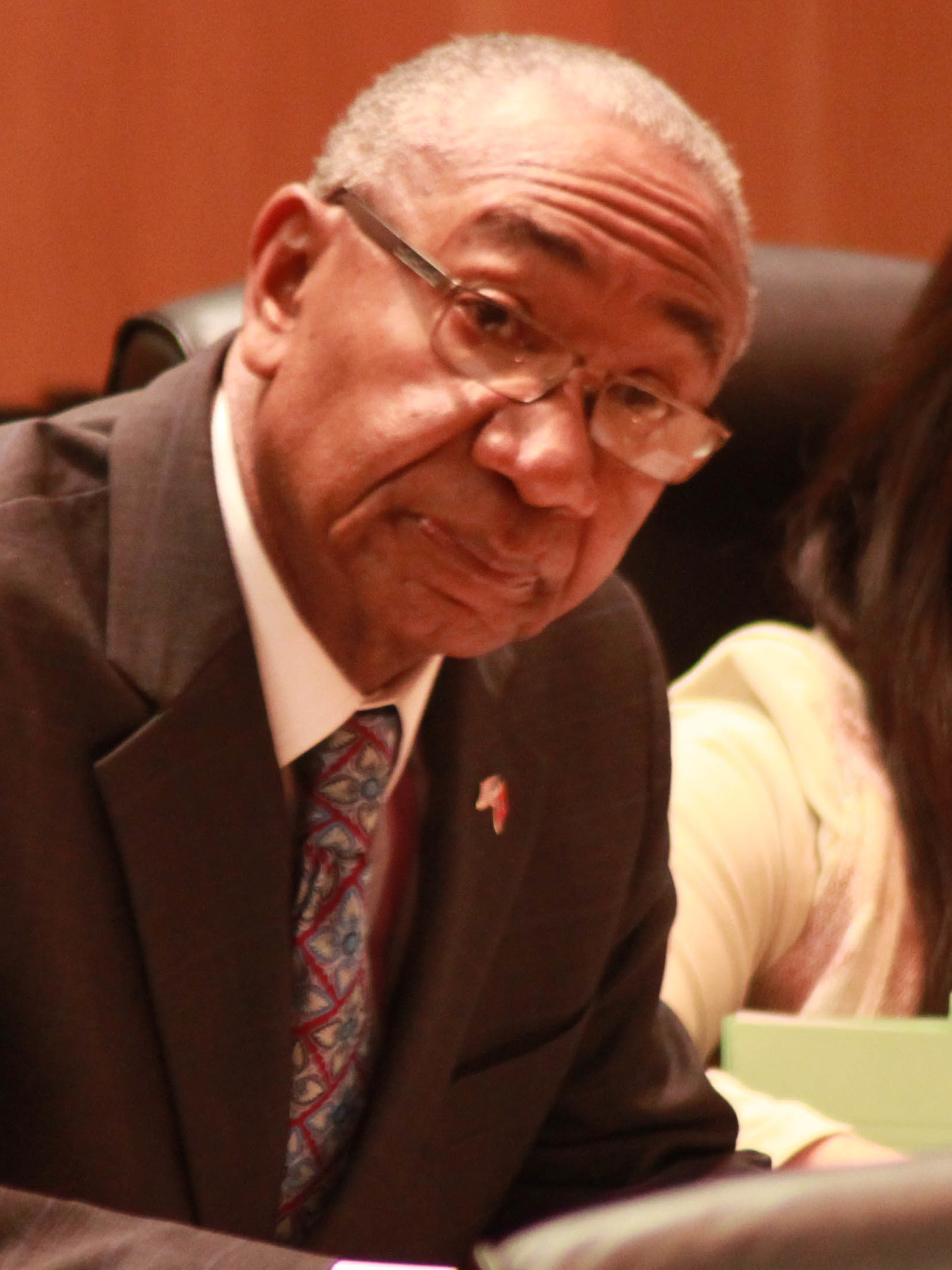
- Shaw in 2014

Member of the Tennessee House of Representatives from the 80th district
- Incumbent
- Assumed office January 9, 2001
- Preceded by: Page Walley

Personal details
- Born: January 5, 1942 (age 84) Laconia, Tennessee, U.S.
- Party: Democratic
- Spouse: Opal Shaw
- Children: 6
- Education: American Baptist College (AS)
- Website: House website

Johnny W. Shaw (born January 5, 1942) is an American politician, minister, and radio station owner who serves in the Tennessee House of Representatives. He is a member of the Democratic Party and has represented the 80th district, encompassing parts of Hardeman, Haywood, and Madison counties, since January 2001.

== Early life and education ==
Johnny W. Shaw was born on January 5, 1942, in Laconia, Tennessee. He was raised in Fayette County and Hardeman County by parents who were sharecroppers. At one point when he was young, his family faced eviction after Shaw's father registered to vote. Shaw has an AS in theology from American Baptist College in Jackson.

== Career ==
Shaw began exploring radio in the 1960s, broadcasting a Sunday morning gospel program on WBOL. He became the station's first Black announcer and rose through several positions, eventually working as a general manager.

In 1987, Shaw and his wife Opal established the Shaw Broadcasting Company and purchased WBOL. They later founded WOJG. In 1997, Shaw became a co-commissioner of Hardeman County.

== Tennessee House of Representatives ==
In 2000, Shaw ran to represent the 80th district of the Tennessee House of Representatives, which was being vacated by Republican incumbent Page Walley. Shaw was one of three Democrats running in the election. Though he lost in Madison County, the most populated part of the district, his wide margin of victory in more rural areas secured him a plurality of votes and the Democratic nomination. In the general election, Shaw defeated independent Sheila Godwin with nearly 85 percent of the vote, becoming the first Black state legislator from rural West Tennessee since Reconstruction.

Shaw is a moderate Democrat. As of 2023, he held a 38 percent lifetime rating from the American Conservative Union.

== Personal life ==
Shaw is a pastor at Saint John Missionary Baptist Church in Stanton. He is married to his wife, Opal. Both were members of the Shaw Singers, a gospel musical group. They have six children. He lives in Bolivar, Tennessee.

== Electoral history ==
Electoral history of Johnny Shaw
| Year | Office | District | Party | Primary | | | General | | | Result | Ref. |
| Year | Office | District | Party | Total | % | P. | Total | % | P. | Result | Ref. |
|---|---|---|---|---|---|---|---|---|---|---|---|
| 2000 | Tennessee House of Representatives | 80 | Democratic | 2,216 | 47.1% | 1st | 10,588 | 84.4% | 1st | Won | |
| 2002 | Tennessee House of Representatives | 80 | Democratic | 4,474 | 78.7% | 1st | 9,583 | 100.00% | 1st | Won | |
| 2004 | Tennessee House of Representatives | 80 | Democratic | 3,368 | 87.1% | 1st | 14,275 | 100.00% | 1st | Won | |
| 2006 | Tennessee House of Representatives | 80 | Democratic | 5,109 | 100.00% | 1st | 9,615 | 68.0% | 1st | Won | |
| 2008 | Tennessee House of Representatives | 80 | Democratic | 1,469 | 100.00% | 1st | 17,917 | 100.00% | 1st | Won | |
| 2010 | Tennessee House of Representatives | 80 | Democratic | 4,793 | 100.00% | 1st | 7,638 | 56.6% | 1st | Won | |
| 2012 | Tennessee House of Representatives | 80 | Democratic | 4,416 | 100.00% | 1st | 17,697 | 100.00% | 1st | Won | |
| 2014 | Tennessee House of Representatives | 80 | Democratic | 4,912 | 100.00% | 1st | 7,862 | 100.00% | 1st | Won | |
| 2016 | Tennessee House of Representatives | 80 | Democratic | 2,845 | 71.64% | 1st | 14,847 | 100.00% | 1st | Won | |
| 2018 | Tennessee House of Representatives | 80 | Democratic | 5,046 | 100.00% | 1st | 12,227 | 100.00% | 1st | Won | |
| 2020 | Tennessee House of Representatives | 80 | Democratic | 3,757 | 100.00% | 1st | 15,395 | 100.00% | 1st | Won | |
| 2022 | Tennessee House of Representatives | 80 | Democratic | 4,428 | 100.00% | 1st | 8,724 | 100.00% | 1st | Won | |
| 2024 | Tennessee House of Representatives | 80 | Democratic | 2,494 | 72.9% | 1st | 12,140 | 60.8% | 1st | Won | |
