= Colonel McNeal House =

Historic house in Tennessee, United States

- U.S. Historic district – Contributing property
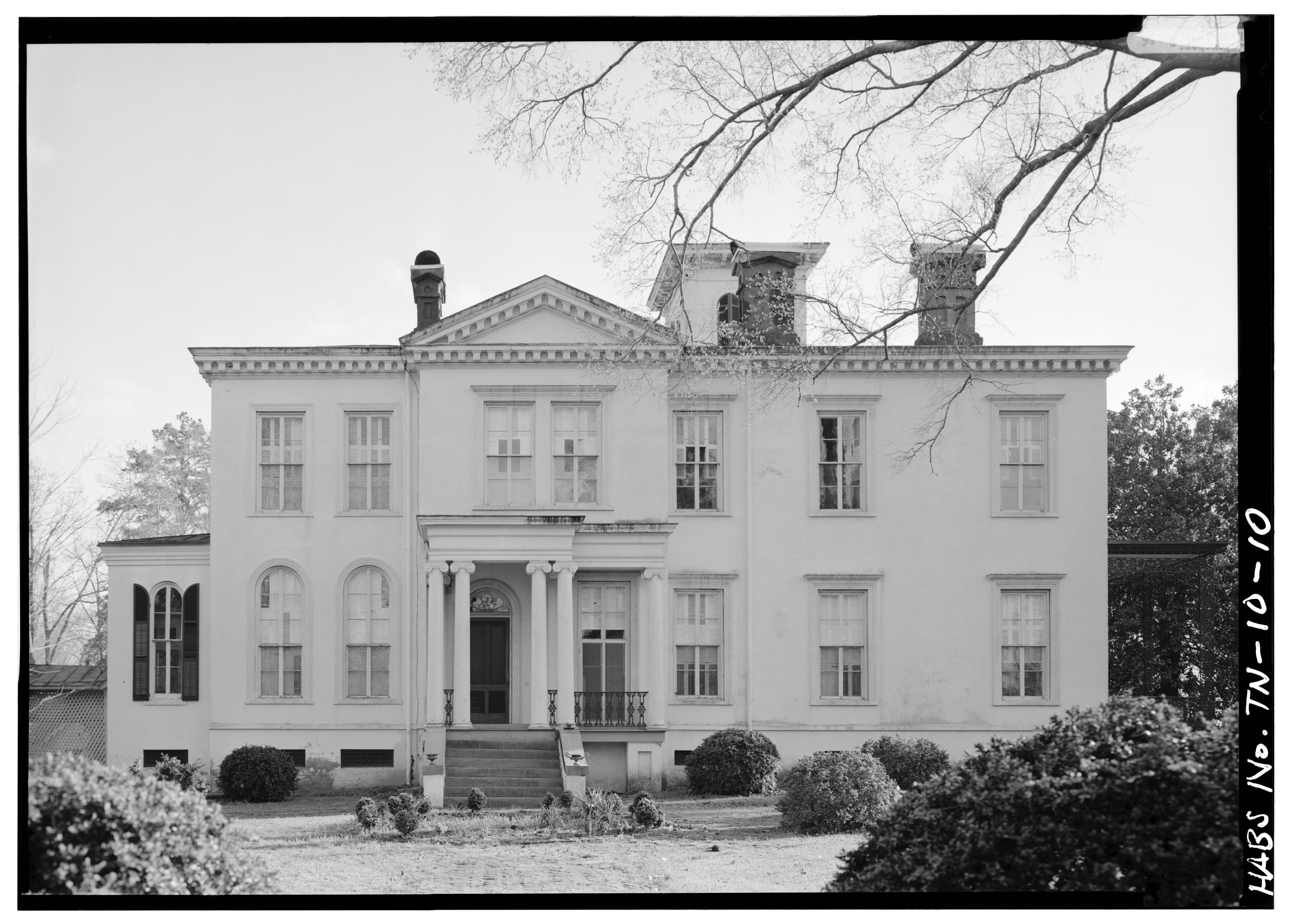
- Location: Bolivar, Tennessee
- Architectural style: Italianate
- Part of: Bills-McNeal Historic District (ID80003829)
- Added to NRHP: February 12, 1980

Colonel McNeal House, also referred to as McNeal Place or the Ezekiel Polk McNeal House, is an Italianate mansion in Bolivar, Tennessee, part of Hardeman County, Tennessee. The home was built for Major Ezekiel Polk McNeal's (born 1804) and his wife after their only child, a teenage daughter named Priscilla, died in 1854. Initial construction began circa 1858 and the mansion was completed during the American Civil War circa 1861–62. It was designed by architect Samuel Sloan. In National Register of Historic Places filings it is described as "the finest Italianate house in West Tennessee and among the most outstanding in the state." The residence is a two-story brick building with square cupola. The home is located on Bills Street and Union Street. It is part of the Bills-McNeal Historic District.

Ezekiel McNeal born September 6, 1804 was a cousin of U.S. President James K. Polk. His grandfather Ezekiel Polk died August 31, 1824, and is buried at the Polk Cemetery in Bolivar. McNeal was the son of Thomas McNeal and Clarissa (Polk) McNeal, daughter of Ezekiel Polk.

Numerous photos and plans of the house were made as part of a Historic American Buildings Survey (HABS) project. The house was identified as Italianate.

A "service section" was connected to the house by a path. The property includes an octagonal wash house with a brick chimney and a frame smokehouse with a pyramidal roof.

In 2015 and 2016 the home was part of a history, legends, and ghosts tour of the area.

The home features a rose garden and trees planted by McNeal.

== Gallery ==
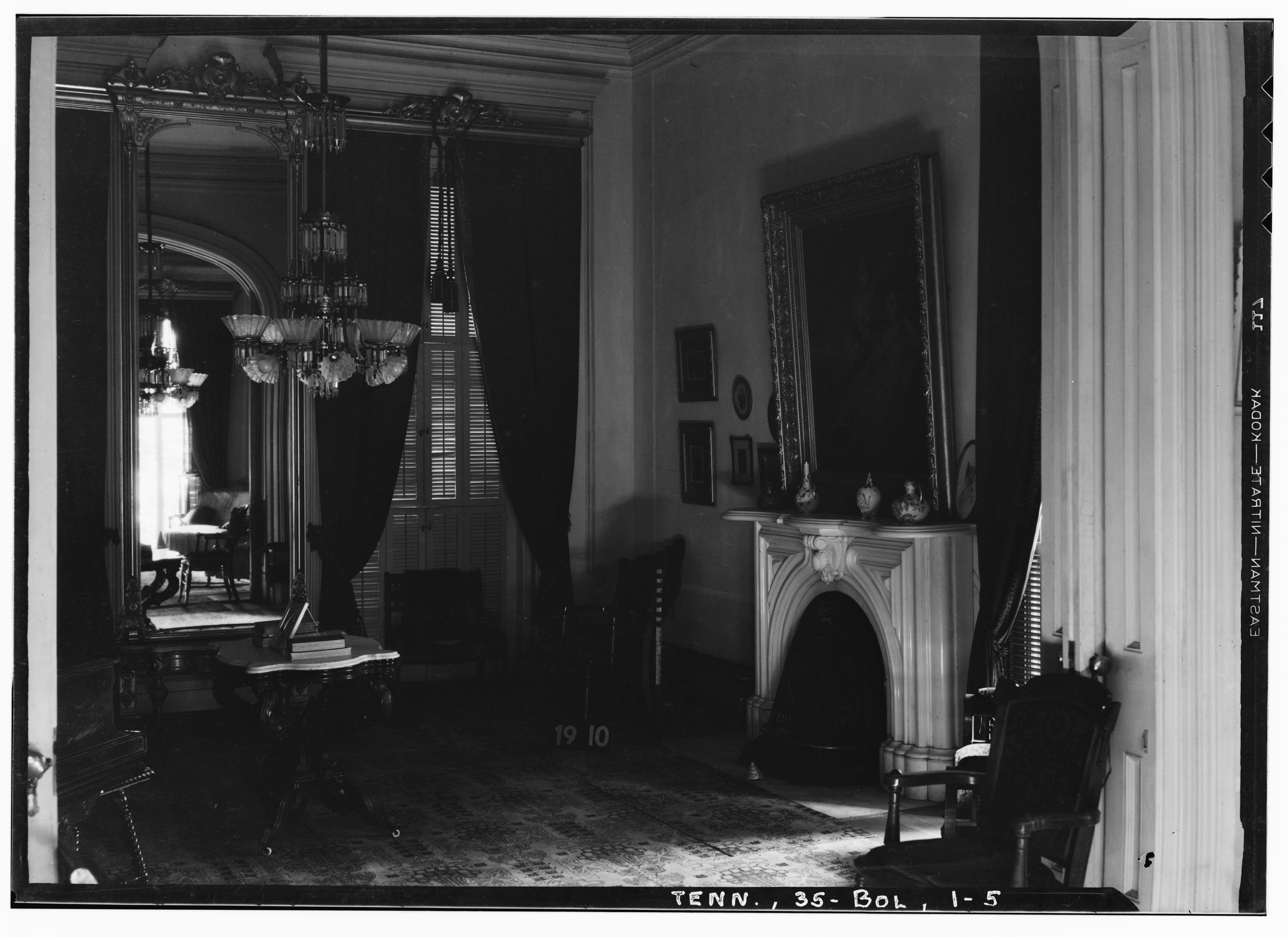
Interior parlor

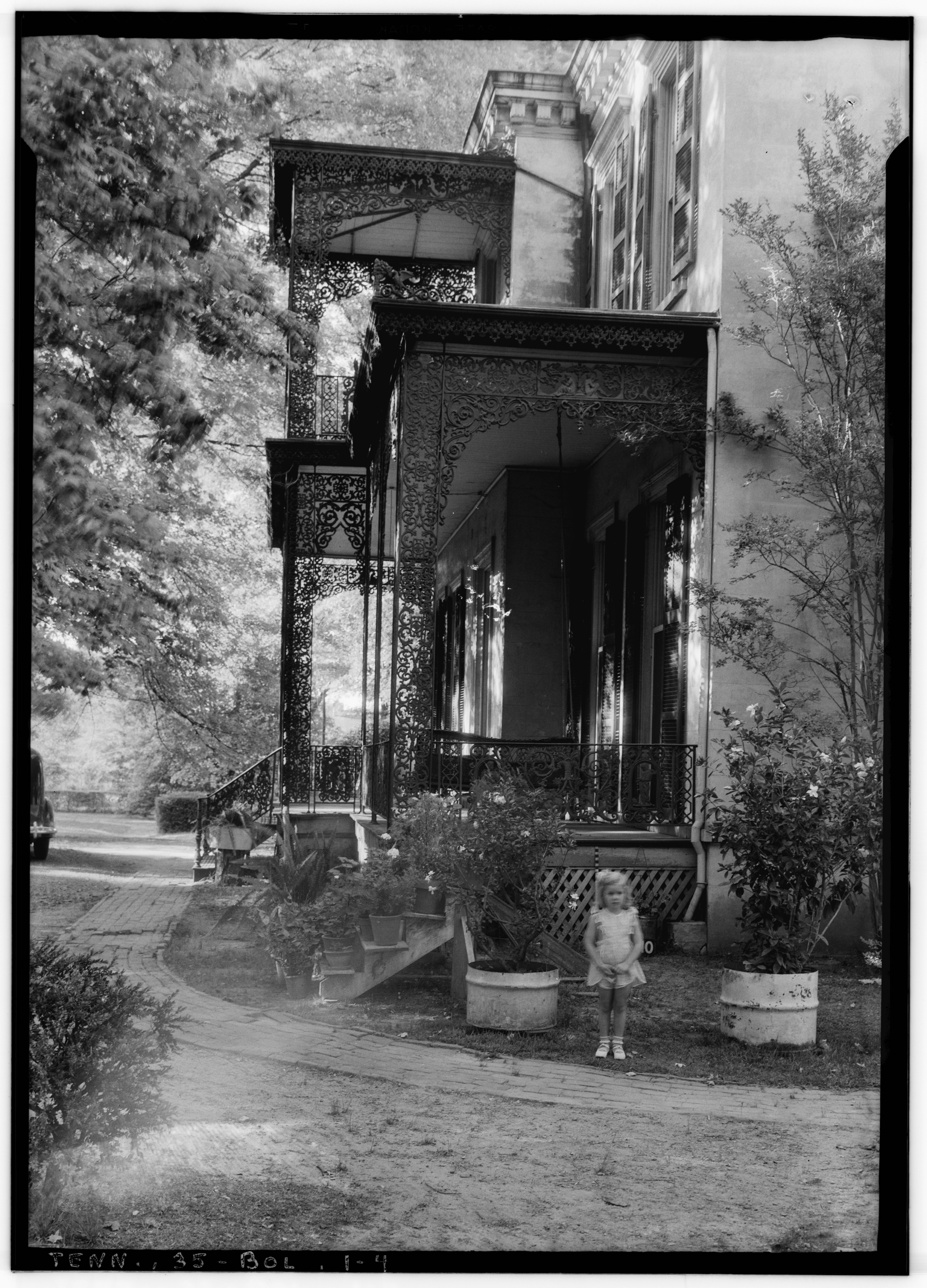
Iron porch

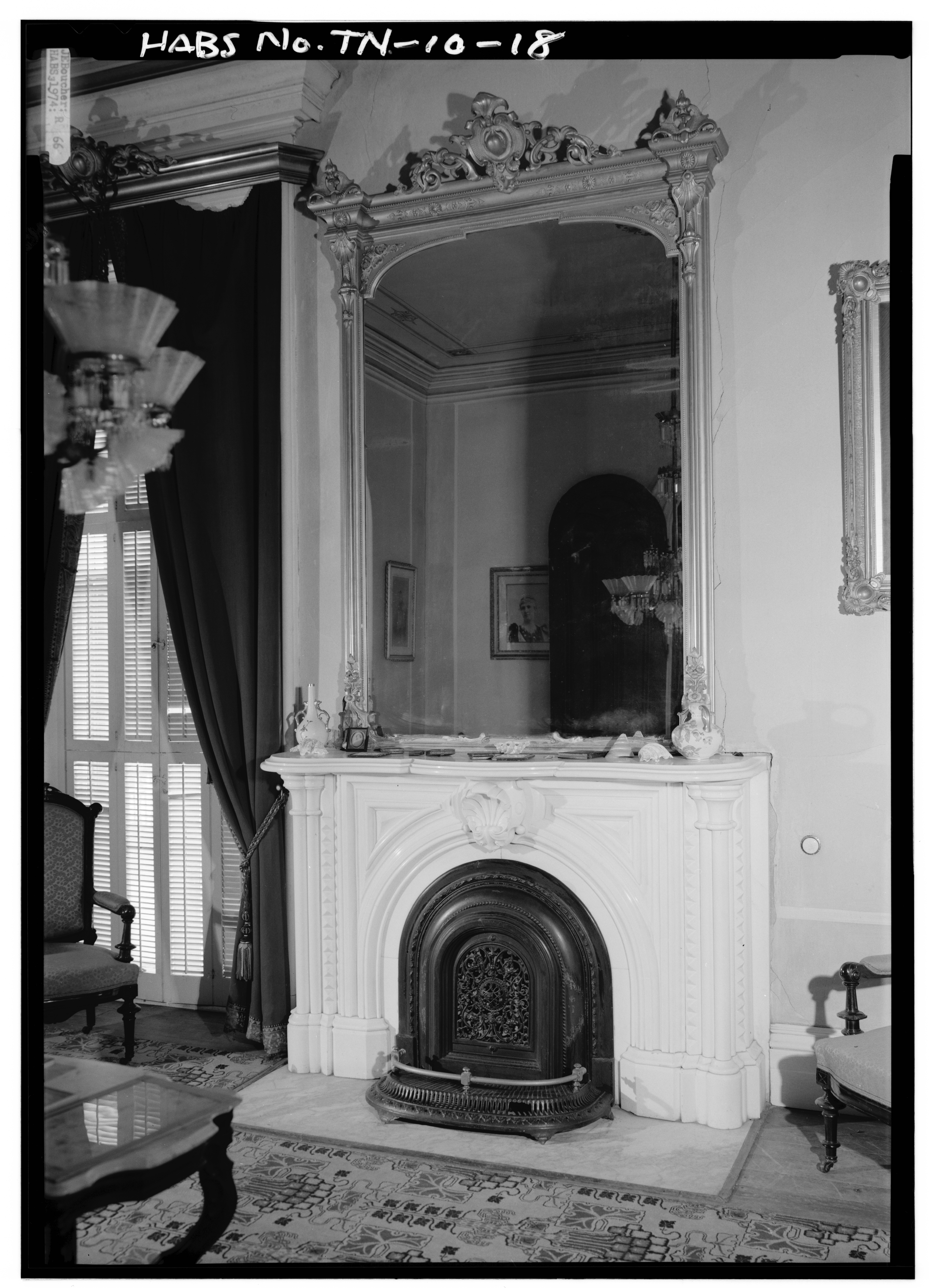
Fireplace with firebox and mirror above

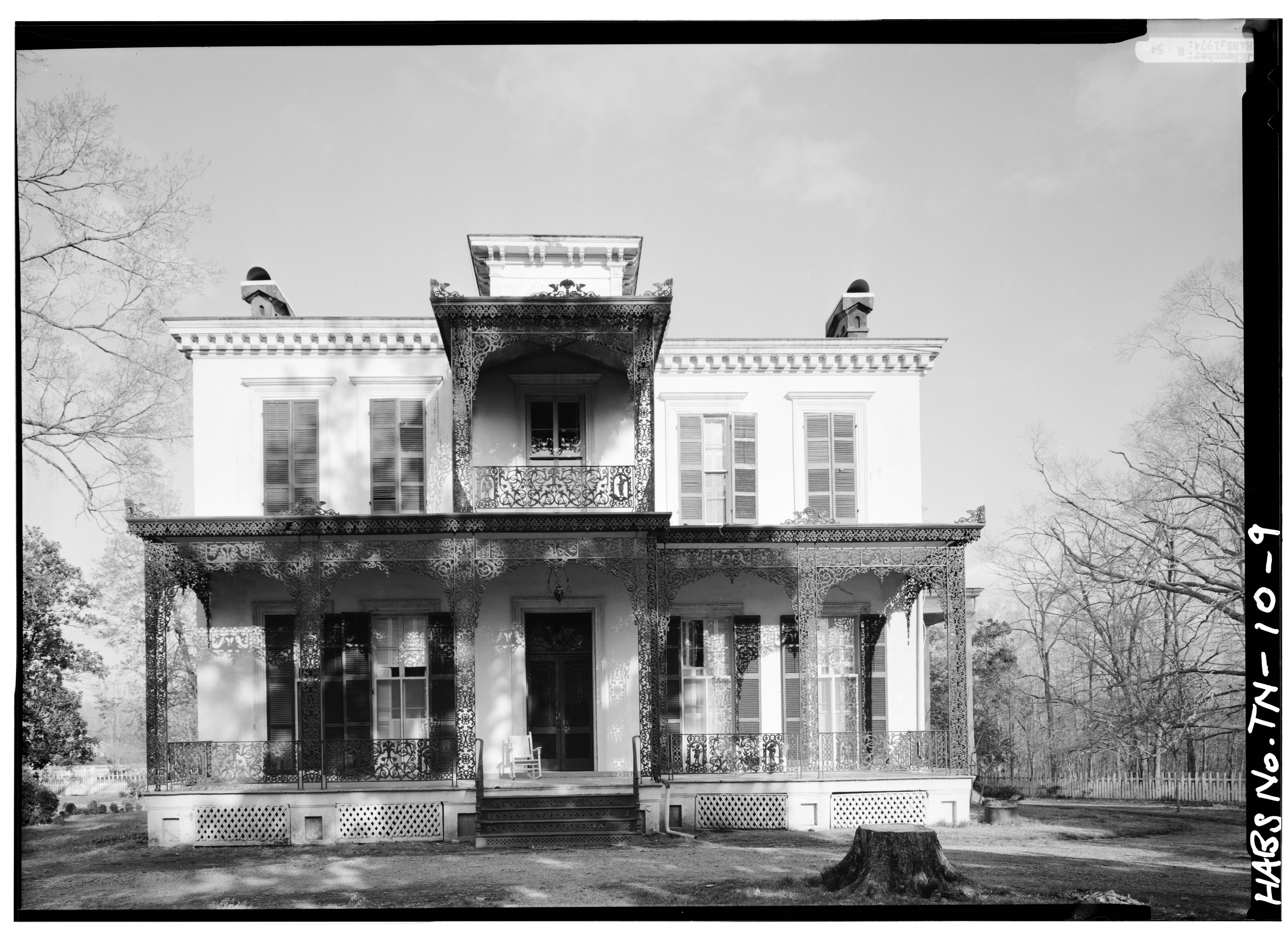
West elevation

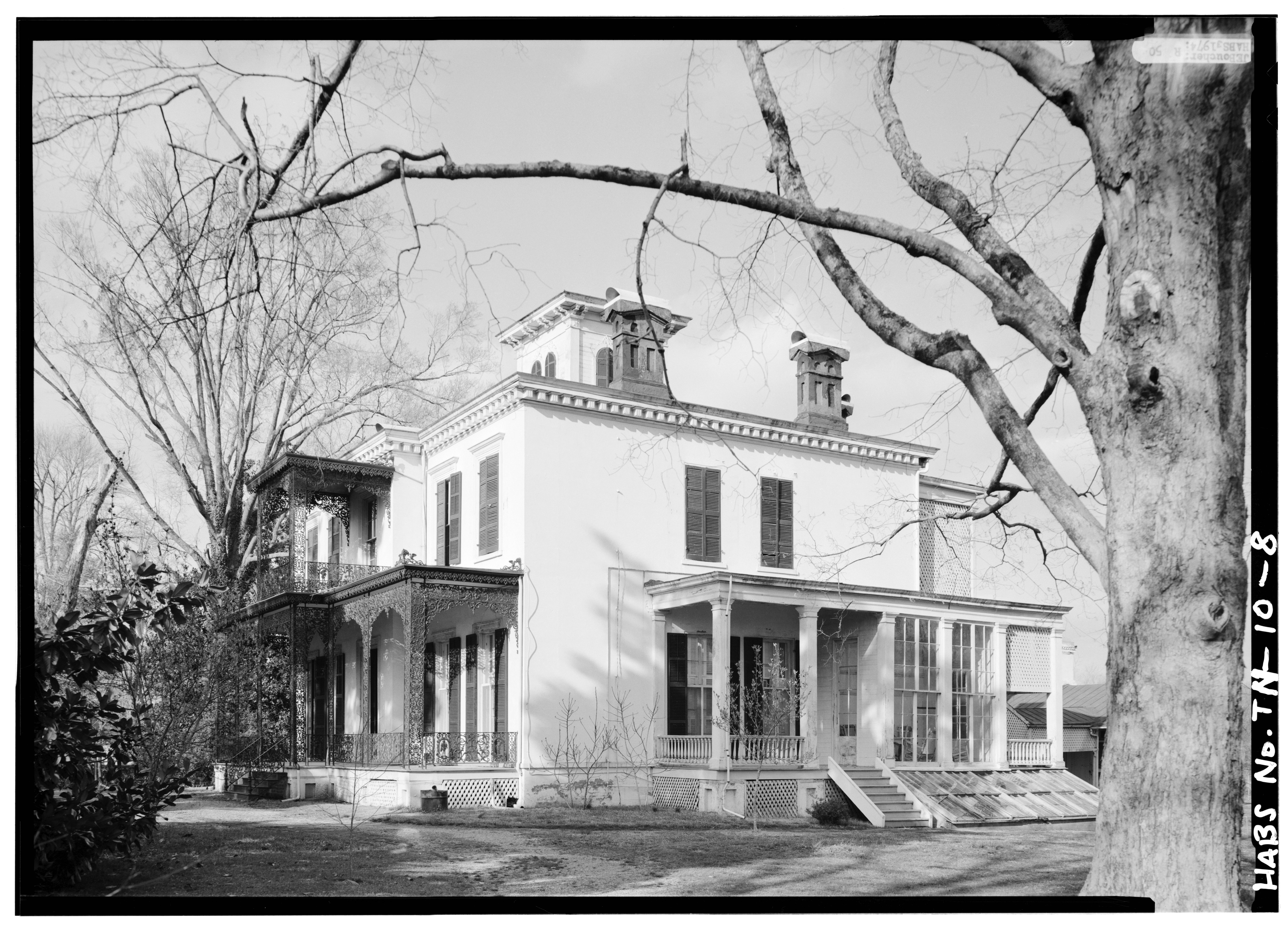
West and South elevations

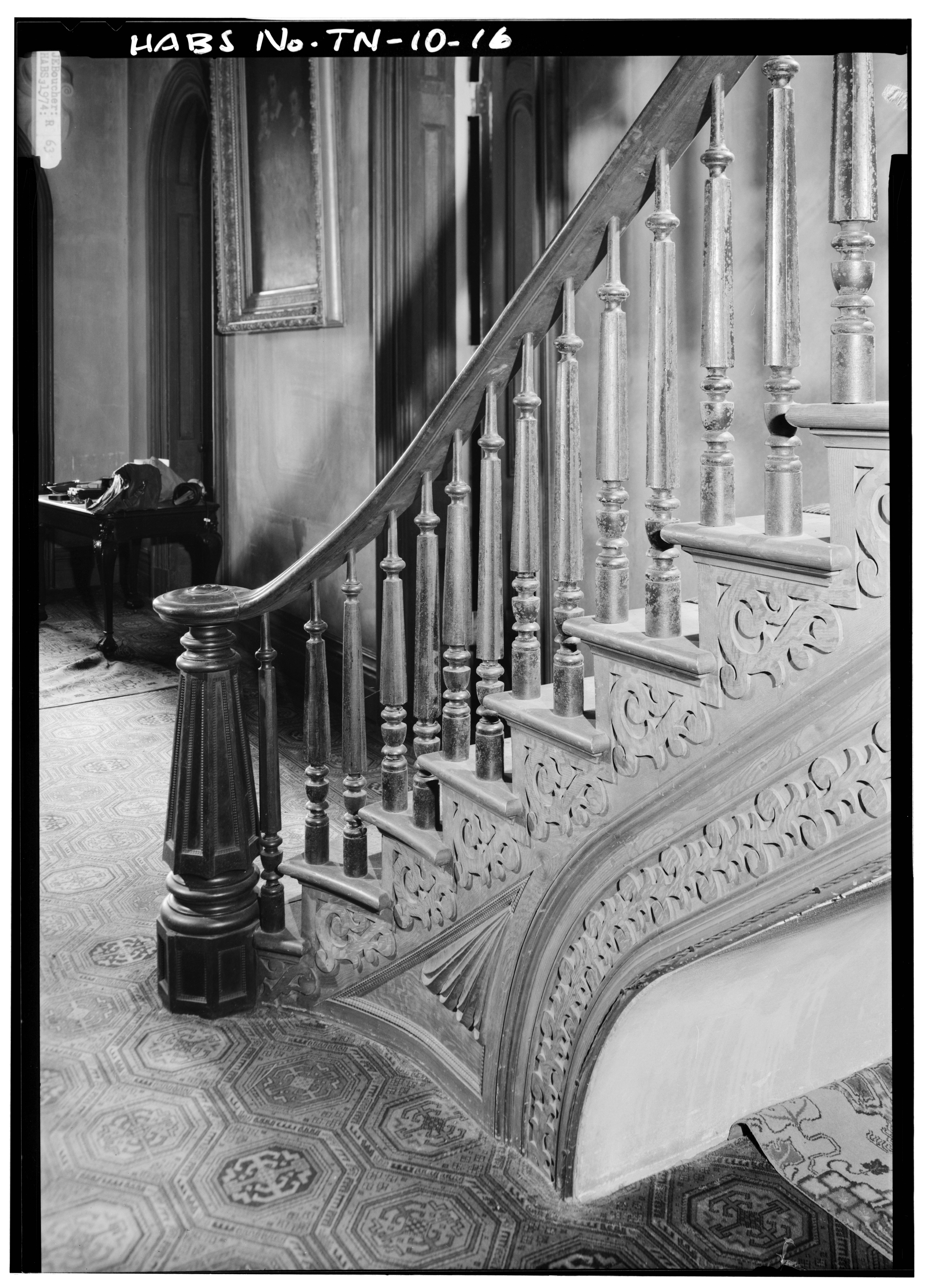
Main stairway

HABS schematic

== See also ==
- National Register of Historic Places listings in Hardeman County, Tennessee
