= Tennessee's 26th Senate district =

American legislative district

Tennessee's 26th State Senate district
Senator
Page Walley; R–Somerville
- Demographics: 77% White; 17% Black; 3% Hispanic; 2% Multiracial
- Population (2022): 216,366

Tennessee's 26th Senate district is one of 33 districts in the Tennessee Senate. It has been represented by Republican Page Walley since 2020, succeeding retiring fellow Republican Dolores Gresham.

== Geography ==
District 26 covers rural West Tennessee to the east of Memphis, including all of Chester, Fayette, Hardeman, Hardin, Haywood, Lawrence, McNairy, and Wayne Counties. Communities in the district include Brownsville, Savannah, Oakland, Henderson, Bolivar, Selmer, Whiteville, and Somerville.

The district is located largely within Tennessee's 8th congressional district, also extending into the 7th district. It borders the states of Alabama and Mississippi. At over 4,000 square miles, it is the largest legislative district in the state.

== Recent election results ==
Tennessee Senators are elected to staggered four-year terms, with odd-numbered districts holding elections in midterm years and even-numbered districts holding elections in presidential years.

=== 2020 ===
2020 Tennessee Senate election, District 26
Primary election
Party	Candidate	Votes	%
Republican	Page Walley	13,076	53.1
Republican	Jai Templeton	11,543	46.9
Total votes		24,619	100
General election
Republican	Page Walley	62,701	75.9
Democratic	Civil Miller-Watkins	19,918	24.1
Total votes		82,619	100
Republican hold			

=== 2016 ===
2016 Tennessee Senate election, District 26
Primary election
Party	Candidate	Votes	%
Republican	Dolores Gresham (incumbent)	9,936	52.8
Republican	Bob Shutt	8,889	47.2
Total votes		18,825	100
General election
Republican	Dolores Gresham (incumbent)	54,210	100
Total votes		54,210	100
Republican hold			

=== 2012 ===
2012 Tennessee Senate election, District 26
Party	Candidate	Votes	%
Republican	Dolores Gresham (incumbent)	42,990	60.4
Democratic	Meryl Rice	28,131	39.6
Total votes		71,121	100
Republican hold			

=== Federal and statewide results ===
Year	Office	Results
2020	President	Trump 71.9 – 26.4%
2016	President	Trump 70.0 – 27.6%
2012	President	Romney 64.1 – 34.7%
2012	Senate	Corker 68.1 – 28.4%
