= Robert S. Stallings =

American politician

Member of the Tennessee House of Representatives from the 80th district
- In office January 7, 1975 – January 8, 1991
- Preceded by: Curtis Ross
- Succeeded by: Page Walley

Personal details
- Born: Robert Samuel Stallings; August 15, 1927 Bolivar, Tennessee, U.S.
- Died: June 6, 2012 (aged 84) Bolivar, Tennessee, U.S.
- Party: Democratic
- Spouse: Judy Carole Willoughby (m. 1990; died 2011)
- Children: 5
- Occupation: agricultural product merchant

Robert Samuel Stallings (August 15, 1927 – June 6, 2012) was an American politician in the state of Tennessee. Stallings served in the Tennessee House of Representatives as a Democrat from the 80th District from 1975 to 1991 (89th, 90th, 91st, 92nd, 93rd, 94th, 95th and 96th General Assemblies). A native of Bolivar, Tennessee, he was an agricultural product dealer. He was succeeded by Republican Page Walley.
