= Hickory Valley, Tennessee =

- Town
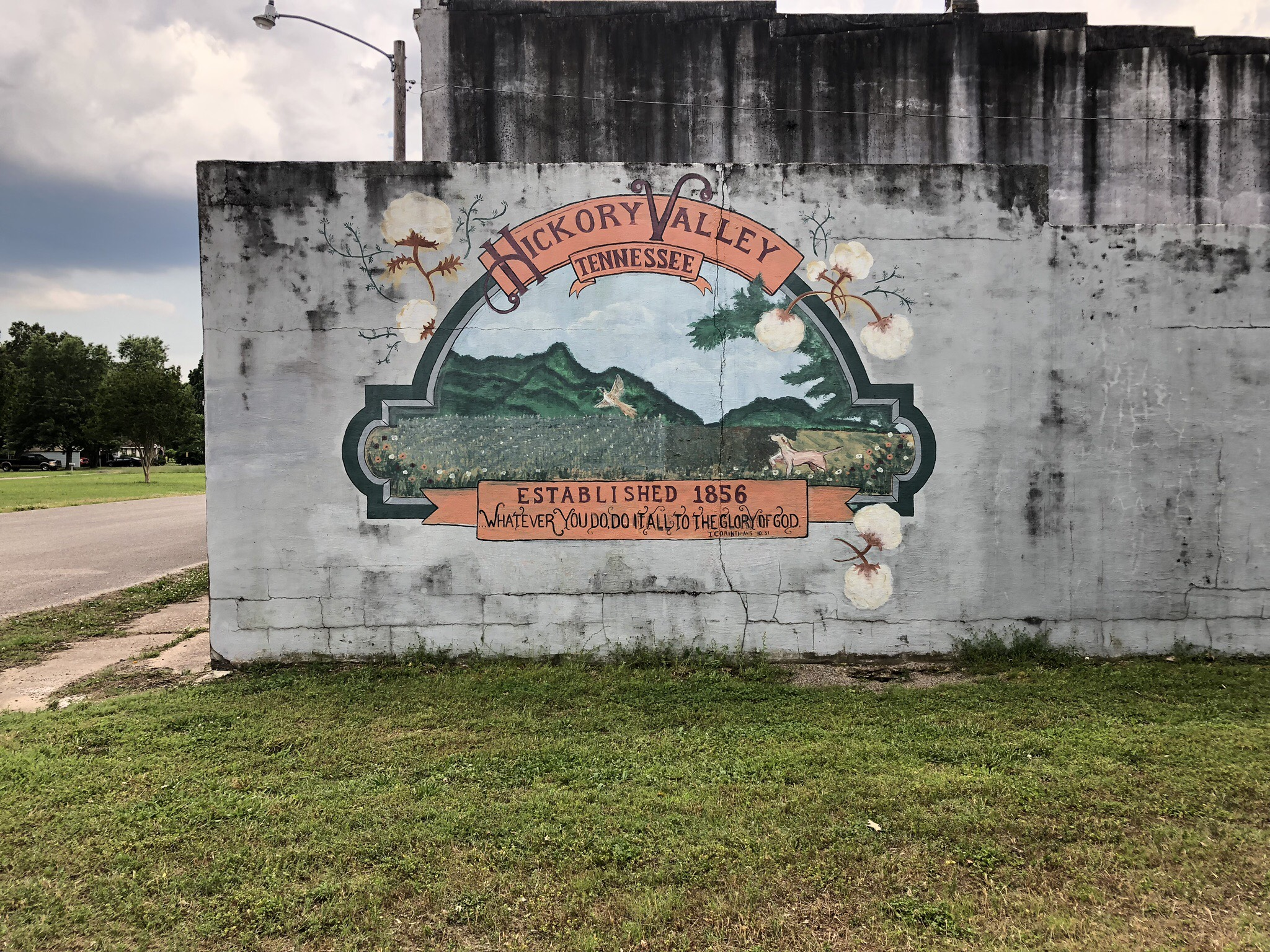
- The mural in central Hickory Valley, 2019

- Location of Hickory Valley in Hardeman County, Tennessee.
- Coordinates: 35°9′18″N 89°7′36″W
- Country: United States
- State: Tennessee
- County: Hardeman
- Incorporated: 1820

Area
  - Total: 0.32 sq mi (0.82 km^{2})
  - Land: 0.32 sq mi (0.82 km^{2})
  - Water: 0 sq mi (0.00 km^{2})
- Elevation: 564 ft (172 m)

Population (2020)
  - Total: 78
  - Density: 246.2/sq mi (95.06/km^{2})
- Time zone: UTC-6 (Central (CST))
  - Summer (DST): UTC-5 (CDT)
- ZIP code: 38042
- Area code: 731
- FIPS code: 47-33920
- GNIS feature ID: 1287628

Hickory Valley is a town in Hardeman County, Tennessee, United States. As of the 2020 census, Hickory Valley had a population of 78. Hickory Valley's origin dates back to the blending of three independent pioneer settlements in the area that were founded by three men: William Shinault in 1820, Drury Wood in 1826 and William Barnett in 1827.

== History ==
Hickory Valley's origin dates back to the blending of three independent pioneer settlements in the area that were founded by three men: William Shinault in 1820, Drury Wood in 1826 and William Barnett in 1827. The Shinault Settlement formed before Hardeman County was organized and featured the first school in Hardeman County, which operated as early as 1823. The main buildings of the settlement were located one mile southwest of the present town and a former Indian trail and the historical Boliver-LaGrange Road are still visible in some places south of Hickory Valley. In 1826 Drury Wood migrated to the area and founded the Hickory Valley settlement; a cemetery for the Wood family is still located in the area and marks the original site of the settlement. William Barnett would move into the area in 1827 and would establish Mt. Comfort Church and a campground about two miles west of the present town. The Chickasaw also resided in the area.

The construction of the railroad into the area in the 1850s brought a growth in population. A railroad levee that runs through the town is still visible, and is believed to have been built by slaves from a plantation owned by Darius Robinson. Railroad engineer Casey Jones was a frequenter of the town during his travels.

Hickory Valley was deeply affected by the Civil War. The railroad fell under the control of the Union Army after being abandoned by the Confederate Army. Skirmishes were fought in the area as well. In 1873 the city was laid out again and the city began to revive until the yellow fever epidemic of 1878. The town's population was described by the Bolivar Bulletin as "fleeing from the scourge". The town was also quarantined in 1882 due to a smallpox outbreak.

== Geography ==
Hickory Valley is located at 35°9′18″N 89°7′36″W (35.154873, -89.126577).

According to the United States Census Bureau, the town has a total area of 0.3 square miles (0.78 km^{2}), all land.

== Demographics ==
Historical population
Census	Pop.	Note	%±
1880	78		—
1890	157		101.3%
1960	179		—
1970	180		0.6%
1980	252		40.0%
1990	159		−36.9%
2000	136		−14.5%
2010	99		−27.2%
2020	78		−21.2%

As of the census of 2000, there were 136 people, 59 households and 35 families residing in the town. The population density was 418.7 inhabitants per square mile (161.7/km^{2}). There were 65 housing units at an average density of 200.1 per square mile (77.3/km^{2}). The racial makeup of the town was 83.09% White and 16.91% African American.

Of the 59 households, 23.7% had children under the age of 18 living in them, 47.5% were married couples living together, 11.9% had a female householder, and 39% were non-families. 35.6% of all households were made up of individuals, and 22% had someone living alone who was 65 years of age or older. The average household size was 2.31 and the average family size was 3.03.

In the town, the population was spread out, with 23.5% under the age of 18, 7.4% from 18 to 24, 22.1% from 25 to 44, 30.9% from 45 to 64, and 16.2% who were 65 years of age or older. The median age was 44 years. For every 100 females, there were 100 males. For every 100 females aged 18 and over, there were 89.1 males.

The median income for a household in the town was $15,313, and the median income for a family was $22,500. Males had a median income of $21,875 versus $14,688 for females. The per capita income for the town was $8,935. There were 18.4% of families and 16.2% of the population living below the poverty line, including 16.3% of under eighteens and 16.7% of those over 64.

Two churches are located in Hickory Valley with over 30-year histories: Hickory Valley Methodist Church and Hickory Valley Baptist Church.

== Arts and culture ==
Hickory Valley's architecture dates back to the Antebellum period. The town maintains a historic working cotton gin and a small business district, which is a memory of the former railroad town. Hickory Valley has the only remaining sassafras mill in the United States, which sits in front of City Hall. The mill was built and owned by locals in the 1920s and the oil it produced was distributed throughout the country. Hickory Valley is home to the James Monroe Avent House which was listed on the National Register of Historic Places in 2001.

== Transportation ==
Transport to, from, and within Hickory Valley is generally sparse, though infrastructure does exist. Tennessee State Route 18 is the primary way in and out, which runs in a north-northeast to south-southwest pattern throughout the city.

The closest airport to Hickory Valley is William L. Whitehurst Field, located off State Route 18 halfway between the town and Bolivar, Tennessee. The airport, however, does not have any regularly scheduled commercial service; the closest airports with commercial service are McKellar–Sipes Regional Airport (served exclusively by Southern Airways Express) and Memphis International Airport.
