= Page Walley =

American politician (born 1957)

Member of the Tennessee Senate from the 26th district
- Incumbent
- Assumed office January 12, 2021
- Preceded by: Dolores Gresham

Member of the Tennessee House of Representatives from the 80th district
- In office January 8, 1991 – January 9, 2001
- Preceded by: Robert S. Stallings
- Succeeded by: Johnny Shaw

Personal details
- Born: Page Blakeslee Walley; March 2, 1957 (age 69) Chattanooga, Tennessee, U.S.
- Party: Republican
- Spouse: Terry McVay (m. 1985)
- Children: 3
- Education: Davidson College (AB); University of Georgia (MS, PhD)
- Website: Senate website

Page Blakeslee Walley (born March 2, 1957) is an American politician, clinical psychologist, and former child-welfare administrator serving as a Republican member of the Tennessee Senate for the 26th district since January 2021. He previously served in the Tennessee House of Representatives from 1991 to 2001 and held senior administrative positions in Tennessee and Alabama's human-services agencies.

== Early life and education ==
Walley was born March 2, 1957, in Chattanooga and grew up in La Grange. He received a bachelor's degree in psychology from Davidson College and his master's and doctorate degrees in clinical psychology from the University of Georgia. He married the former Teresa Anne McVay in Miami on June 21, 1985.

== Career ==
=== Early career ===
Walley began his professional career in clinical psychology and mental-health services. From 1985 to 1987, he served as director of Christian Counseling Ministry at University Baptist Church in Coral Gables, Florida. He later became clinical director of Potomac Highlands Mental Health Center in Petersburg, West Virginia, serving from 1987 to 1988.

After returning to Tennessee, Walley served as clinical director of Quinco Community Mental Health Center in Bolivar from 1988 to 1993. He later worked as a psychologist at Genesis Christian Counseling Center in Jackson from 1993 to 1994 and as a clinical psychologist at Superior Life Care Services from 1994 to 1999. He also worked as a clinical consultant at Quinco and as a behavioral-health consultant and manager of Walley Consulting.

Walley is a licensed clinical psychologist and has been affiliated with American Psychological Association.

=== Tennessee House of Representatives ===
Walley was elected to the Tennessee House of Representatives in 1990, representing the 80th district. He served from January 1991 to January 2001 as a Republican member of the state's lower legislative chamber. During his tenure, he worked on legislative matters involving government administration, health and human services, and child welfare.

=== Tennessee Department of Children's Services ===
In April 1999, Walley became commissioner of the Tennessee Department of Children's Services while continuing his involvement in public affairs. Following his departure from the department, Walley continued working in public-sector human services and child-welfare administration.

=== Alabama human-services administration ===
Walley subsequently served as commissioner of the Alabama Department of Human Resources. His work included overseeing programs intended to support vulnerable children, adults, and families.

=== Other works ===
Walley later worked with Casey Family Programs, a national foundation focused on improving child-welfare systems and reducing the need for foster care. He served as managing director of strategic consulting.

He has also served as an adjunct faculty member in psychology at the University of Alabama at Birmingham, where his teaching has included child clinical psychology.

=== Tennessee Senate ===
Walley was elected to the Tennessee Senate in November 2020 and took office in January 2021, representing the 26th district. He was reelected in November 2024 for a second term in the Senate. The district includes Chester, Fayette, Hardeman, Hardin, Haywood, Lawrence, McNairy, and Wayne county.

In the 114th Tennessee General Assembly, which convened in 2025, Walley served as vice-chair of the Senate State and Local Government Committee. He also served on the Senate Finance, Ways and Means Committee, the Senate Energy, Agriculture and Natural Resources Committee, and the Council on Pensions.

=== Legislative activity ===
In 2021, Walley supported legislation establishing Tennessee's participation in the Psychology Interjurisdictional Compact, which allows eligible psychologists to practise across participating jurisdictions under specified conditions. The measure became Public Chapter 352 in May 2021.

In 2026, Walley sponsored Senate Bill 2055, enacted as Public Chapter 1112, concerning services for students with autism spectrum disorder and developmental delays. The law allows qualifying private-pay providers retained by parents or guardians to deliver services to eligible students during the school day, subject to statutory requirements.

He also sponsored Senate Bill 1469, enacted as Public Chapter 687 in April 2026, which established requirements governing online content involving minors. Another measure he sponsored, Senate Bill 2153, became Public Chapter 800 in May 2026. It authorizes the Tennessee Department of Mental Health and Substance Abuse Services to establish a voluntary, evidence-based home-visiting program addressing early childhood mental health, child development and family stability.
