= WOJG =

- Bolivar, Tennessee; United States
- Frequency: 94.7 MHz
- Branding: The Word and The Music

Programming
- Format: Gospel

Ownership
- Owner: Shaw's Broadcasting Company; (Johnny W. Shaw & Opal J. Shaw)
- Sister stations: WBOL

History
- Former call signs: WYDB (1991–1993)

Technical information
- Licensing authority: FCC
- Facility ID: 31865
- Class: A
- ERP: 6,000 watts
- HAAT: 100.0 meters (328.1 ft)
- Transmitter coordinates: 35°16′39.00″N 88°55′41.00″W

Links
- Public license information: Public file; LMS
- Webcast: Listen live
- Website: wojg.com

WOJG (94.7 FM, "The Word and The Music") is a radio station broadcasting a gospel music format. Licensed to Bolivar, Tennessee, United States, the station is currently owned by Shaw's Broadcasting Company through licensees Johnny Shaw and Opal J. Shaw.
