= WBOL =

- Bolivar, Tennessee; United States
- Broadcast area
- Frequency: 1560 kHz

Programming
- Format: Oldies

Ownership
- Owner: Shaw's Broadcasting Co.
- Sister stations: WOJG

History
- First air date: 1962
- Former call signs: WJDS (1984–1985); WQKZ (1985–1986)
- Call sign meaning: BOLivar, Tennessee (city of license)

Technical information
- Licensing authority: FCC
- Facility ID: 60029
- Class: D
- Power: 250 watts day
- Transmitter coordinates: 35°15′30″N 88°58′50″W

Links
- Public license information: Public file; LMS

WBOL (1560 AM) is a radio station licensed to Bolivar, Tennessee, United States. The station is owned by Shaw's Broadcasting Co.

== History ==
The station was assigned the call letters February 13, 1984. On April 29, 1985, the station changed its call sign to WQKZ and on March 1, 1986 to the current WBOL.
