= Ron Gant (politician) =

American politician (born 1971)

Member of the Tennessee House of Representatives from the 94th district
- Incumbent
- Assumed office January 9, 2017
- Preceded by: Leigh Wilburn; Jamie Jenkins (interim)

Personal details
- Born: December 10, 1971 (age 54)
- Party: Republican
- Education: University of Tennessee at Martin; Liberty University
- Website: House website Campaign website

Ron M. Gant (born December 10, 1971) is an American insurance agent and politician from the state of Tennessee. A Republican, Gant has represented the 94th district of the Tennessee House of Representatives, based in Fayette and McNairy Counties, since 2017.

== Career ==
Gant was first elected to the Tennessee House of Representatives in 2016, after 94th district incumbent Leigh Wilburn resigned and interim appointee Jamie Jenkins declined to seek re-election. Gant easily won a three-way primary to fill the seat, and faced no significant general election opposition in the heavily Republican district. He has since been elected as Assistant Majority Leader in the chamber.

In 2019, Gant proposed renaming the Cordell Hull State Office Building after former Governor of Tennessee Winfield Dunn. While the move was supported by some fellow Republicans who disagreed with Cordell Hull's politics, Gant faced opposition from legislative Democrats as well as from Dunn himself; the building was not ultimately renamed.

In 2023, Gant supported a resolution to expel three Democratic lawmakers from the legislature for violating decorum rules. The expulsion was widely characterized as unprecedented.

== Personal life ==
Gant lives in Piperton
