= Bills-McNeal Historic District =

Historic district in Tennessee, United States

- U.S. National Register of Historic Places
- U.S. Historic district
- Location within Tennessee Location within the United States
- Location: Irregular pattern along Lafayette, McNeal, Bills, Union, Lauderdale and Washington Sts., Bolivar, Tennessee
- Coordinates: 35°15′11″N 88°59′29″W
- Area: 30 acres (12 ha)
- Architect: Willis & Sloan
- Architectural style: Greek Revival, Gothic, Federal
- NRHP reference No.: 80003829
- Added to NRHP: February 12, 1980

The Bills-McNeal Historic District is a 30 acres (12 ha) historic district in Bolivar, Tennessee which was listed on the National Register of Historic Places in 1980. It then included nine contributing buildings and one contributing site, on portions of Lafayette, McNeal, Bills, Union, Lauderdale and Washington Streets.

It includes:

- McNeal House (1856) designed by architect Samuel Sloan at Bills and Union Street, asserted to be "the finest Italianate house in West Tennessee and among the most outstanding in the state." Two-story brick building with square cupola.
- Hudson-Wood-Fish House (1835), 322 South Washington Street. Federal with Greek Revival-style portico
- St. James Episcopal Church (1869), West Lafayette Street.
- St. James Episcopal Chapel (1870), West McNeal Street.
- Ingram House, "The Columns" (1860), 303 West McNeal Street. Greek Revival, remodeled in 1909 to add Colonial Revival portico and other
- Wright-Smith House (1867), West McNeal Street.
- Bills House, "The Pillars" (c.1831), 322 South Washington Street
- Mark House "Wrens Nest" (c.1860), 308 Bills Street.

== See also ==
- National Register of Historic Places listings in Hardeman County, Tennessee
