= Bolivar Female Academy =

Women's school in Bolivar, Tennessee, US

- Type: Private
- Active: 1832–c. 1900
- Location: Bolivar, Tennessee, United States

Bolivar Female Academy was a former women's school in Bolivar, Hardeman County, Tennessee.

== History ==
The Bolivar Male Academy opened in 1826 in Bolivar, Tennessee. This first school in town was started by Dr. John Rogers; however, he left Boliver soon after. Its counterpart, he Bolivar Female Academy, opened on the other side of town in 1832. Both schools were supported by tution fees. In December 1840, Levi Joy was president of the Bolivar Female Academy; Mrs. R. C. Berry was hired as its principal, with Mrs. Frances Attwood as her assistant. Rev. L. Jansen was the principal of the Bolivar Female Academy in 1852.

During the Civil War, the town of Bolivar was under military law from 1862 to May 1864. In 1862, the Boliver Female Academy was used as a hospital established by General Stephen A. Hurlbut’s army.

After the war, Rev. W. C. Gray of the local Episcopal church served as the academy's principal. He was replaced by Mary A. Galloway by January 1867. Professor J. W. Graham of Nashville was the principal of the academy in 1872, followed by Mrs. L. W. Cralli in February 1874, E. W. Prince in 1975, and Mrs. M. J. Thompson in February 1876.

In the late 1880s, Bolivar had six private schools, as well as a public school. By 1892, there was community support for a tax for secondary public schools. A new public school was constructed that included four classrooms and a chapel. In the fall of 1896, Professor J. T. Hill was the Bolivar Female Academy's principal. He began a marketing campaign to seek more students, including distributing pamphlets and catalogs.

However, this effort failed and the school closed. Its building was used as a public school. In March and April 1901, a bill was introduced and passed in the Tennessee General Assembly to allow the sale of the school. In August 1901, the Bolivar Board of Education announced the sale of the former Bolivar School for Females. After it was sold, the building was used as a residence.

== Campus ==
Bolivar Female Academy was located at the south end of Main Street in Bolivar, Tennessee. Its building was constructed for the school. Initially, Bolivar Female Academy lacked dormitories; T. B. Adams operated a boarding house in Bolivar for the out-of-town students who attended the school.

== Academics ==
Bolivar Female Academy was non-sectarian and was not affiliated with a specific church. The school was divided into classes for beginning and intermediate students. Its curriculum included arithmetic, English, French geography, grammar, history, Latin, reading, and spelling. Other classes included drawing, embroidery, painting, and music, including guitar and piano.

== Student activities ==
The students presented musical entertainment for the community. In June 1866, the students held a strawberry festival that raised $90 for the Monumental Association, an organization formed to erect a Confederate memorial in Bolivar.

The academy was home to a Delta Gamma sorority chapter from 1878 to 1881. The students also had field trips, such as a picnic to Dunlap Springs.
