= Hatchie River Ferry =

- U.S. National Register of Historic Places
- Location within Tennessee Location within the United States
- Location: End of Big Bend Ln, 1.0 mile south of State Route 15, near Bolivar, Tennessee
- Coordinates: 35°13′27″N 88°55′0″W
- Area: 3.6 acres (1.5 ha)
- NRHP reference No.: 05000800
- Added to NRHP: August 7, 2005

Hatchie River Ferry, also known as Miller's Ferry and as Statler's Ferry, on the Hatchie River near Bolivar, Tennessee, was listed on the National Register of Historic Places in 2005.

The ferry crossing was used by a party of Cherokee Nation persons emigrating to Oklahoma, led by John Adair Bell, who was one of the signers of the Treaty of New Echota. The group crossed the Hatchie River here on November 16–17, 1838.

In 1923 a map shows that there was a sawmill and Statler's Bridge at the crossing.

The listed property is 3.6 acres (1.5 ha) in area and includes parts of three real estate parcels. It includes 1,400 feet (430 m) of the original roadbed of the historic Savannah-Bolivar Road approaching the Hatchie River on the east side, plus ferry landing area on both east and west banks of the road, and concrete bridge abutments in the river which date from the early 1900s.

The site is deemed significant for its association with the Trail of Tears.
