= United Sons and Daughters of Charity Lodge Hall =

- U.S. National Register of Historic Places
- Location within Tennessee Location within the United States
- Location: 322 W. McNeal St., Bolivar, Tennessee
- Coordinates: 35°15′22″N 88°59′4″W
- Area: less than one acre
- Built: c. 1928
- Built by: United Sons & Daughters of Charity
- Architectural style: Pyramidal
- MPS: Rural African-American Churches in Tennessee MPS
- NRHP reference No.: 05001222
- Added to NRHP: November 9, 2005

The United Sons and Daughters of Charity Lodge Hall in Bolivar, Tennessee was built in c. 1928 and was listed on the National Register of Historic Places in 2005.

It is an "unassuming" wood-frame building on brick piers, with a hipped roof. The building was primarily used for religious worship services and for other community purposes.

It is a surviving artifact of the United Sons and Daughters of Charity, a local self-help organization, formed in 1873 by a group of African-American men.
