= Pocahontas School =

- U.S. National Register of Historic Places
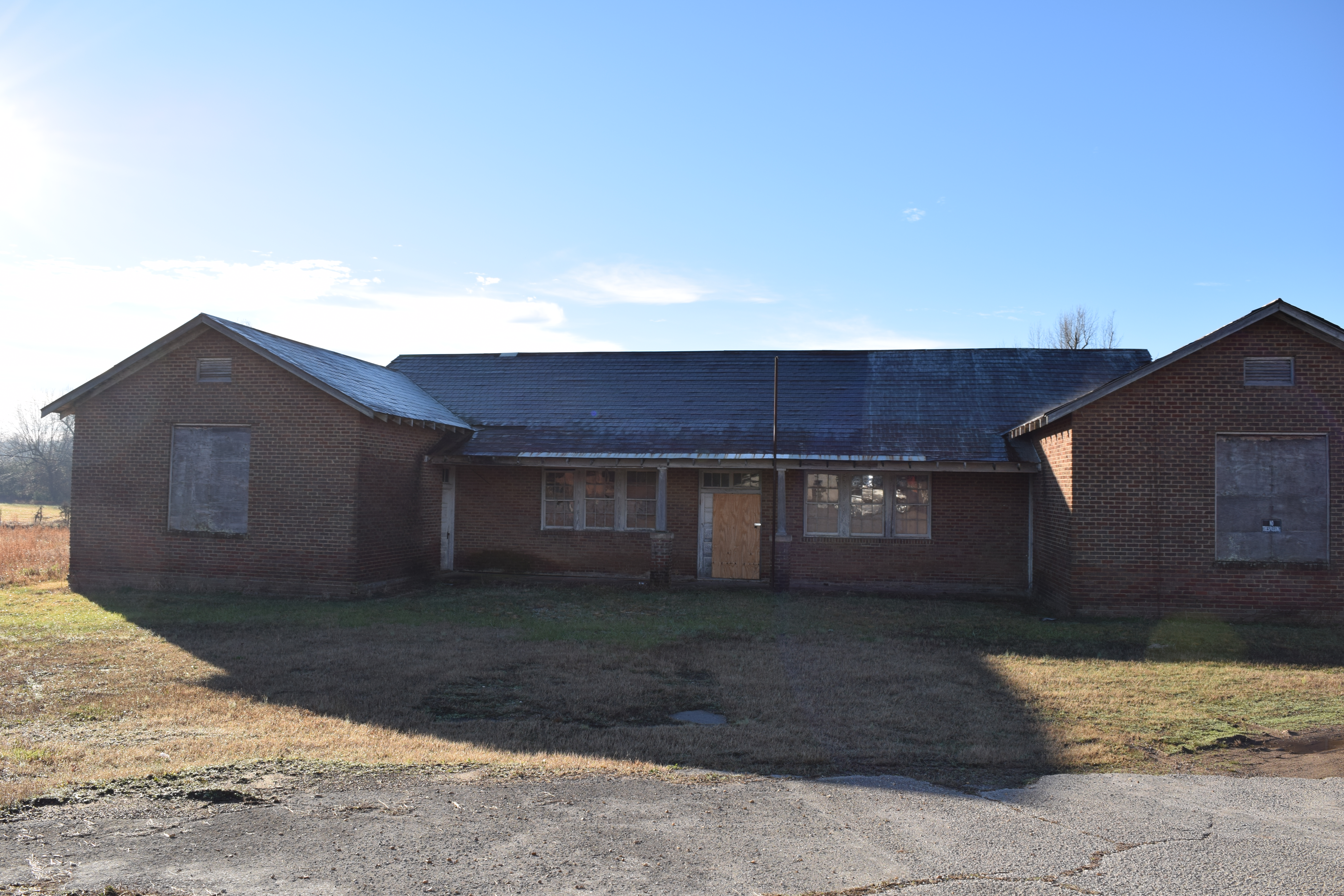

- Location within Tennessee Location within the United States
- Location: 22555 TN 57, Pocahontas, Tennessee
- Coordinates: 35°2′52″N 88°48′17″W
- Area: 3 acres (1.2 ha)
- Built: 1924
- Architectural style: Bungalow/craftsman
- NRHP reference No.: 07000706
- Added to NRHP: July 19, 2007

Pocahontas School is a historic school building in Pocahontas, Tennessee, that is listed on the National Register of Historic Places.

== History ==
The school was built in 1924 and operated for the next four decades as the community's main elementary school for white students. A new wing was added in 1957. In 1967 Pocahontas School closed as part of a Hardeman County school consolidation. After the closure the students were transported to the nearby Middleton School and the building was sold to private owners. As of 2007, when it was added to the National Register of Historic Places, it was owned by nearby residents who used the building for storage.

== Description ==
The school is a single-story frame building with a brick veneer. Architecturally, it is an example of a Craftsman-influenced design. The original portion of the school building has an H-shaped layout. Its design was based on a standardized plan for a four-teacher school that was in widespread use in Tennessee and other parts of the southern United States in the 1920s. It is similar to both the Rosenwald school four-teacher school design of that period and Plan No. 4 in the Tennessee Department of Education's 1928 Rural School Building Plans. This design provided for four classrooms, an auditorium, and a room designed to serve as both a library and a principal’s office. Pocahontas School was one of several similar four-teacher schools built in Hardeman County in the 1920s; it is believed to the only one that is still standing.

The building was heated by coal stoves until 1957, when a coal-fired central furnace and boiler room were installed. In warm weather, the windows and transoms were opened to allow fresh air to circulate. The building has a north-south orientation, which was a prescribed element of the standard design, intended to provide appropriate interior lighting. This expansion in the school and its facilities was not matched by the town of Pocahontas. During the depression and throughout the second world war the management arranged for one of the classrooms to be converted into a kitchen so that students could be fed. The town's prosperity, which was based on cotton production, declined after 1940.

Facilities in the school yard included privies, a playground with swings and a slide, two basketball courts and a baseball field. The 1957 expansion of the building included installation of indoor plumbing, including indoor bathrooms, thus eliminating the need for the privies. A cafeteria also was added in 1957.

In 2007, the building was described as "a rare example of an early 20th century rural school building" with its original floor plan and architectural details largely intact. The playground and sports facilities had been removed from the school grounds, but an original metal flagpole still stood at the front of the building.
