= William L. Whitehurst Field =

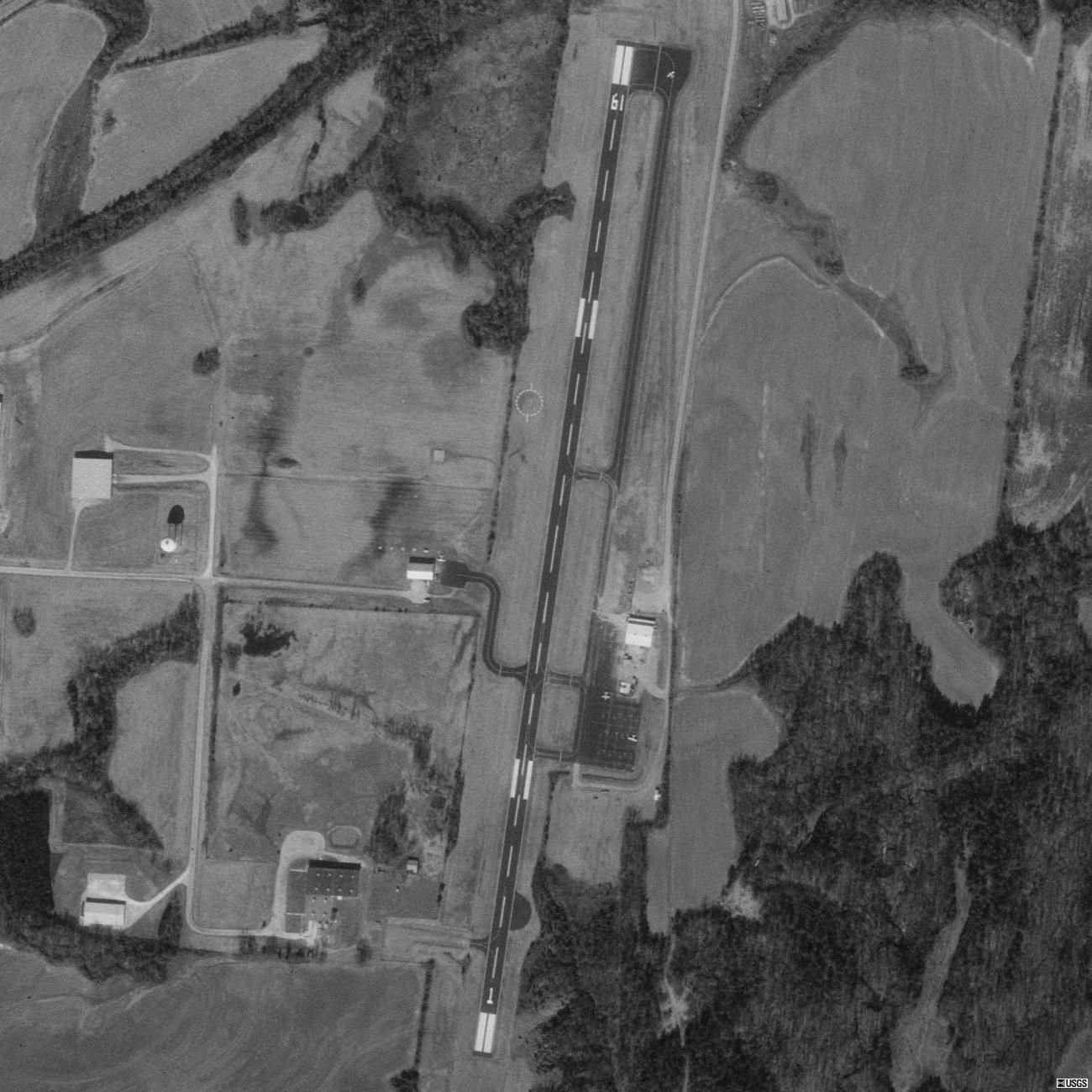
- IATA: none; ICAO: none; FAA LID: M08

Summary
- Airport type: Public
- Owner: Hardeman County
- Serves: Bolivar, Tennessee
- Elevation AMSL: 499 ft / 152 m
- Coordinates: 35°12′52″N 089°02′36″W

Map
- Location of airport in Tennessee M08 (the United States)

Runways
| Direction | Length | | Surface |
| Direction | ft | m | Surface |
|---|---|---|---|
| 1/19 | 5,007 | 1,526 | Asphalt |

Statistics (2019)
- Aircraft operations (year ending 6/30/2019): 2,540
- Source: Federal Aviation Administration

William L. Whitehurst Field (FAA LID: M08) is a county-owned, public-use airport located four nautical miles (7 km) southwest of the central business district of Bolivar, a city in Hardeman County, Tennessee, United States.

== Facilities and aircraft ==
William L. Whitehurst Field covers an area of 194 acres (79 ha) at an elevation of 499 feet (152 m) above mean sea level. It has one runway designated 1/19 with a 5,007 by 75 ft (1,526 by 23 m) asphalt surface. For the 12-month period ending June 30, 2019, the airport had 2,540 aircraft operations, an average of 49 per week: 87% transient general aviation; 9% local general aviation; 4% military

The airport is attended from 0830 to 1700 local time and has 100LL aviation fuel and Jet-A available, plus 93 mogas (for approved aircraft). It is included under the McKellar-Sipes Regional Airport FSS. It has medium intensity runway lighting and PAPI on both runways. NOTAMs are filed with McKellar-Sipes Regional Airport.

== See also ==
- List of airports in Tennessee
