= Bolivar Court Square Historic District =

Historic district in Tennessee, United States

- U.S. National Register of Historic Places
- U.S. Historic district
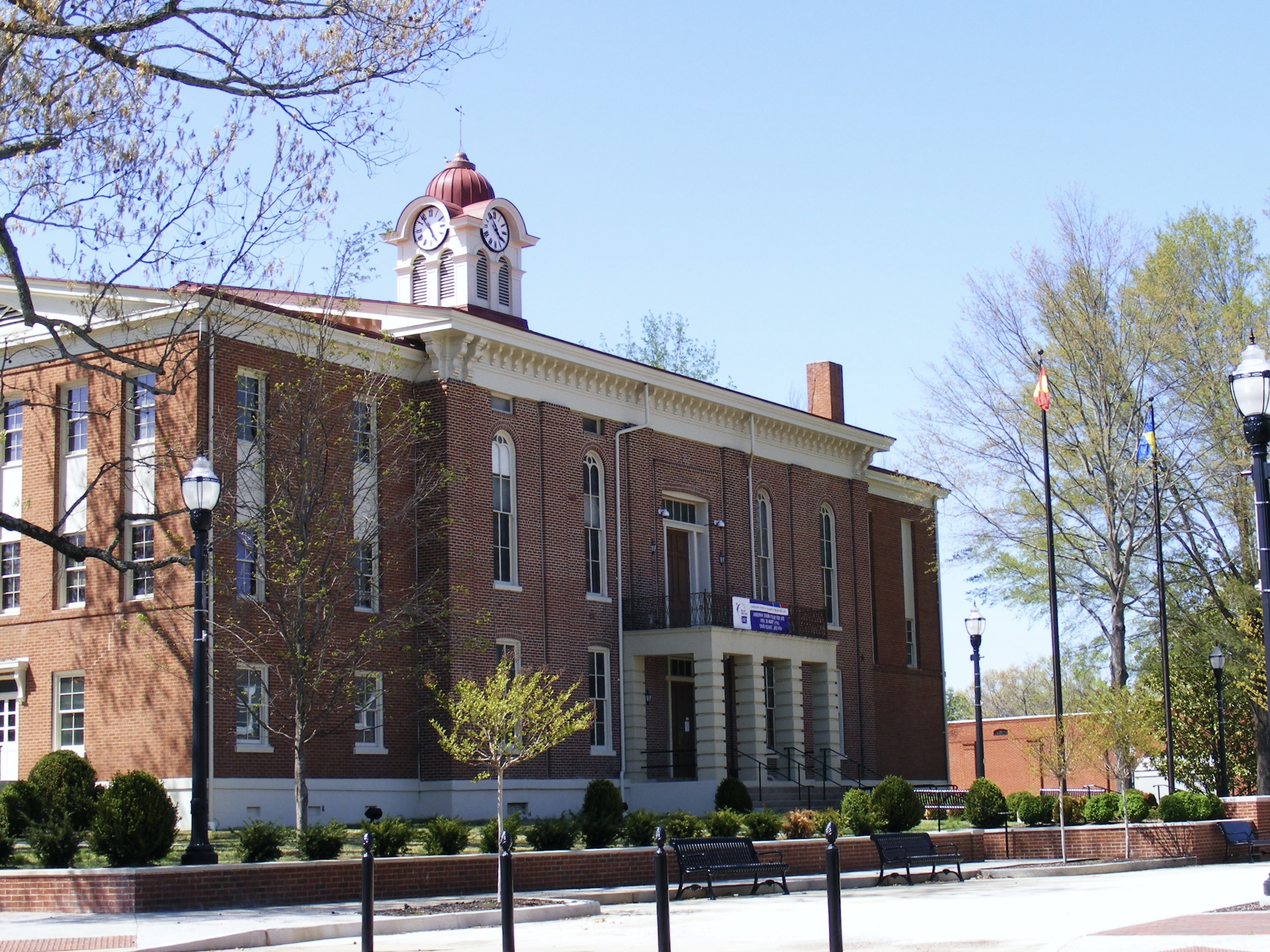

- Location within Tennessee Location within the United States
- Location: TN 125 and U.S. 64, Bolivar, Tennessee
- Coordinates: 35.256111°N 88.986944°W
- Area: 14 acres (5.7 ha)
- Architect: Willis, Sloan & Trigg
- Architectural style: Classical Revival, Greek Revival, Italianate
- NRHP reference No.: 80003830
- Added to NRHP: January 10, 1980

The Bolivar Court Square Historic District in Bolivar, Tennessee is a 14 acres (5.7 ha) historic district which was listed on the National Register of Historic Places in 1980. It then included 28 contributing buildings and a contributing object (a monument). It also includes 12 non-contributing buildings.

It is at U.S. Route 64 and State Route 125

Architectural firm Willis, Sloan & Trigg contracted for the courthouse and Spires Boling is credited with the design.

Architecture includes Classical Revival, Greek Revival, and Italianate.
