= Robertson Family Farm =

- U.S. National Register of Historic Places
- U.S. Historic district
- Location within Tennessee Location within the United States
- Location: 2715 Newsom Rd., in or near Whiteville, Tennessee
- Coordinates: 35°20′42″N 89°07′30″W
- Area: 152.9 acres (61.9 ha)
- Built: 1906
- Built by: Robertson, Crawford
- Architectural style: Gabled-Ell Plan
- NRHP reference No.: 07001164
- Added to NRHP: November 8, 2007

The Robertson Family Farm, in or near Whiteville, Tennessee, was listed on the National Register of Historic Places in 2007. It then included four contributing buildings and a contributing site.

It was deemed significant as a rare surviving example of a farm operated by the same African-American family for over 100 years. It was started by Crawford Robertson who was born a slave in Arkansas; it was operated in 2007 by grandson Evelyn Robertson with help of a cousin and a lessee.
