= James Monroe Avent House =

- U.S. National Register of Historic Places
- Location within Tennessee Location within the United States
- Location: 220 Railroad Ave., Hickory Valley, Tennessee
- Coordinates: 35°9′11″N 89°7′36″W
- Area: 1 acre (0.40 ha)
- Architectural style: Queen Anne
- NRHP reference No.: 01000436
- Added to NRHP: April 25, 2001

The James Monroe Avent House in Hickory Valley, Tennessee was listed on the National Register of Historic Places in 2001.

It is a two-and-a-half-story wood-frame Queen Anne-style house on a brick foundation. It was deemed significant as a Queen Anne house and for its association with James Monroe Avent (1860-1936), the "Fox of Hickory Valley," a dog trainer who developed the National Bird Dog Championship during the years he lived in this house.

At the time of NRHP listing in 2001, the house was operated as a bed and breakfast.
