= Laconia, Tennessee =

- Unincorporated community
- Location within Tennessee Location within the United States
- Coordinates: 35°16′56″N 89°15′07″W
- Country: United States
- State: Tennessee
- County: Fayette
- Elevation: 433 ft (132 m)
- Time zone: UTC-6 (Central (CST))
  - Summer (DST): UTC-5 (CDT)
- ZIP code: 38045
- Area code: 901
- GNIS feature ID: 1290442

Laconia is an unincorporated community in Fayette County, Tennessee, United States. Its ZIP code is 38045.
