= Leigh Wilburn =

American lawyer and politician

Member of the Tennessee House of Representatives from the 94th district
- In office January 13, 2015 – December 31, 2015
- Preceded by: Barrett Rich
- Succeeded by: Jamie Jenkins (interim); Ron Gant

Personal details
- Born: May 24, 1983 (age 43)
- Party: Republican
- Spouse: Married
- Website: House website

Leigh Wilburn is an American lawyer and politician from Tennessee. A Republican, she served in the Tennessee House of Representatives.

Wilburn is from Somerville, Tennessee. She was elected to the Tennessee House in 2014, succeeding Barrett Rich, who retired. She resigned on December 31, 2015, midway through her term, due to what she described as "unforeseen circumstances involving my immediate and extended family and my business." Jamie Jenkins was appointed as her replacement.
