= Barrett Rich =

American politician (born 1977)

Member of the Tennessee House of Representatives from the 94th district
- In office January 13, 2009 – January 13, 2015
- Preceded by: Dolores Gresham
- Succeeded by: Leigh Wilburn

Personal details
- Born: June 14, 1977 (age 49)
- Party: Republican
- Spouse: Married
- Education: Bethel College (BS)
- Website: House website

Barrett Rich (born June 14, 1977) is a Republican former member of the Tennessee House of Representatives for the 94th District, encompassing Fayette, Hardeman and Tipton.

== Biography ==
Barrett Rich was born in Somerville, Tennessee on June 14, 1977. He received a B.S. in Management from Bethel College, and graduated from the Tennessee Law Enforcement Training Academy and the Tennessee Highway Patrol Trooper School. He started his career as a Tennessee State Trooper. He now works as an insurance agent.

He is a member of the Somerville Rotary, the Tennessee Right to Life, the Fraternal Order of Police, and the Farm Bureau. He is also involved with the Chambers of Commerce in Fayette, Oakland and South Tipton.

He is a Methodist and a Freemason. He supports the death penalty
