= North Main Street Historic District (Bolivar, Tennessee) =

Historic district in Tennessee, United States

- U.S. National Register of Historic Places
- U.S. Historic district
- Location within Tennessee Location within the United States
- Location: N. Main, Sycamore, Jefferson, Washing and Water Sts., Bolivar, Tennessee
- Coordinates: 35°15′36″N 88°59′18″W
- Area: 35 acres (14 ha)
- Architect: Fletcher & Sloan
- Architectural style: Bungalow/craftsman, Greek Revival, Late Victorian
- NRHP reference No.: 80003831
- Added to NRHP: March 20, 1980

The North Main Street Historic District in Bolivar, Tennessee is a 35 acres (14 ha) historic district which was listed on the National Register of Historic Places in 1980. It then included 25 contributing buildings and 11 non-contributing ones.

It includes portions of N. Main, Sycamore, Jefferson, Washing, and Water Streets.

Notable buildings include:

- Baker House (c.1849), also known as "Mansion House", at 517 North Main Street, is a Greek Revival house with a two-story portico having paired columns with volutes (see photo #1 in accompanying photos).
