= Dolores Gresham =

American politician (born 1942)

Member of the Tennessee Senate from the 26th district
- In office January 13, 2009 – January 12, 2021
- Preceded by: John S. Wilder
- Succeeded by: Page Walley

Member of the Tennessee House of Representatives from the 94th district
- In office January 14, 2003 – January 13, 2009
- Preceded by: Larry Scroggs
- Succeeded by: Barrett Rich

Personal details
- Born: July 16, 1942 (age 84)
- Party: Republican
- Spouse: Will Gresham
- Education: Incarnate Word College (BA); George Washington University (MS); Loyola University (MA)
- Website: House website
- Military career
- Allegiance: United States of America
- Branch: Marine Corps
- Rank: Lieutenant colonel

Dolores Gresham (born July 16, 1942) is a Republican politician from Tennessee. She is a former state senator. Gresham was elected to the Tennessee Senate in the 2008 elections after having served three terms in the Tennessee House of Representatives. Senate District 26 encompassed the counties of Chester, Crockett, Fayette, Hardeman, Hardin, Haywood, McNairy and Wayne in the western part of the state.

== Education ==
Gresham holds a Bachelor of Arts from University of the Incarnate Word, Master of Arts from Loyola University New Orleans and a Master of Science in administration from The George Washington University. She served in the United States Marine Corps, retiring with the rank of lieutenant colonel.

== Political career ==
In 2002, Gresham was elected to the Tennessee House of Representatives from District 94, which includes all of her home county of Fayette as well as parts of Tipton and Hardeman. She was re-elected in 2004 and 2006. During her time in the House, Gresham served on the Agriculture and Education Committees.

In 2008, she vacated her House seat to run for the Senate seat of John S. Wilder, the former lieutenant governor, who was retiring after 42 years in the Senate. She faced the Democrat Randy Camp, a former aide to Governor Phil Bredesen. The seat was considered one of the most competitive as both parties sought to end a 16–16–1 stalemate in the Senate. Gresham defeated Camp 54%–46%, as the Republicans took control of both houses of the Tennessee General Assembly for the first time since Reconstruction.

== Personal life ==
Gresham lives with her husband Will in Somerville. They attend St. Philip the Apostle Catholic Church.

Preceded by John S. Wilder	Member of the Tennessee Senate from District 26; 2008–2021	Succeeded by Page Walley
