= Bolivar, Tennessee =

City in Tennessee, United States

- City
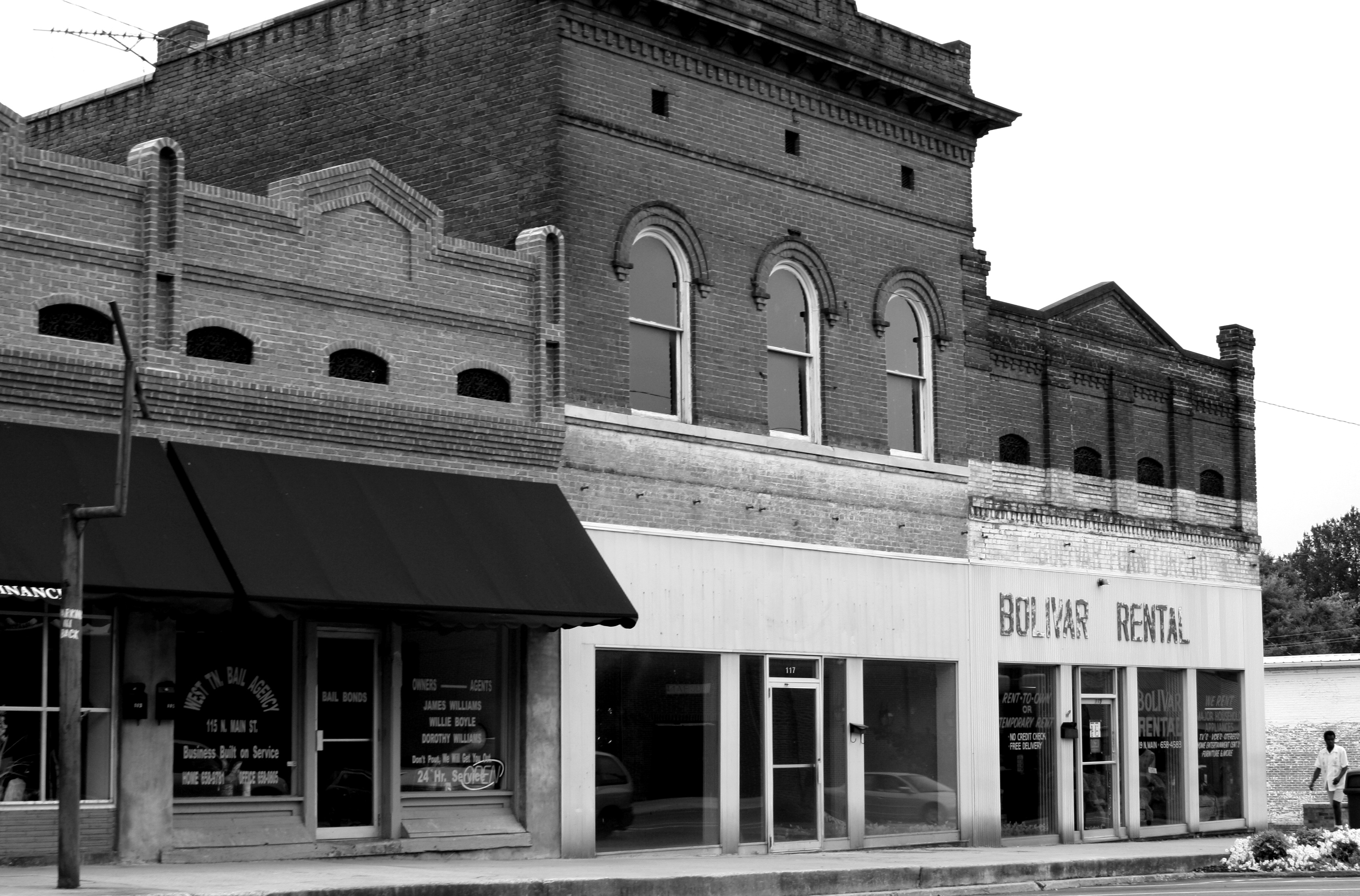
- Downtown Bolivar

- Location of Bolivar in Hardeman County, Tennessee.

- Location in the United States
- Coordinates: 35°16′N 89°0′W
- Country: United States
- State: Tennessee
- County: Hardeman
- Chartered: October 18, 1825

Government
  - Mayor: Julian A. McTizic Sr.

Area
  - Total: 8.12 sq mi (21.04 km^{2})
  - Land: 8.11 sq mi (21.01 km^{2})
  - Water: 0.012 sq mi (0.03 km^{2})
- Elevation: 446 ft (136 m)

Population (2020)
  - Total: 5,205
  - Density: 641.5/sq mi (247.69/km^{2})
- Time zone: UTC-6 (Central (CST))
  - Summer (DST): UTC-5 (CDT)
- ZIP codes: 38008, 38074
- Area code: 731
- FIPS code: 47-07180
- GNIS feature ID: 1269372
- Website: www.cityofbolivar.com

Bolivar is a city in and the county seat of Hardeman County, Tennessee, United States. As of the 2020 census, Bolivar had a population of 5,205.

== History ==
Bolivar was named for South American revolutionary leader Simón Bolívar. The area is home to several historic properties and historic districts among the National Register of Historic Places listings in Hardeman County, Tennessee including Bolivar Court Square Historic District, Western State Hospital Historic District, North Main Street Historic District, and the Bills-McNeal Historic District.

== Geography ==
According to the United States Census Bureau, the city has a total area of 8.5 square miles (22 km^{2}), of which 8.5 square miles (22 km^{2}) is land and 0.12% is water.

== Demographics ==
Historical population
Census	Pop.	Note	%±
1850	626		—
1860	1,213		93.8%
1870	889		−26.7%
1880	1,043		17.3%
1890	1,100		5.5%
1900	1,035		−5.9%
1910	1,076		4.0%
1920	1,031		−4.2%
1930	1,217		18.0%
1940	1,314		8.0%
1950	2,429		84.9%
1960	3,338		37.4%
1970	6,674		99.9%
1980	6,597		−1.2%
1990	5,969		−9.5%
2000	5,802		−2.8%
2010	5,417		−6.6%
2020	5,205		−3.9%

As of the 2020 census, Bolivar had a population of 5,205, with 2,133 households and 1,183 families residing in the city.

=== Racial and ethnic composition ===
Bolivar city, Tennessee – Racial and ethnic composition Note: the US Census treats Hispanic/Latino as an ethnic category. This table excludes Latinos from the racial categories and assigns them to a separate category. Hispanics/Latinos may be of any race.
Race / Ethnicity (NH = Non-Hispanic)	Pop 2000	Pop 2010	Pop 2020	% 2000	% 2010	% 2020
White alone (NH)	2,439	1,907	1,606	42.04%	35.20%	30.85%
Black or African American alone (NH)	3,264	3,315	3,303	56.26%	61.20%	63.46%
Native American or Alaska Native alone (NH)	4	10	5	0.07%	0.18%	0.10%
Asian alone (NH)	25	55	40	0.43%	1.02%	0.77%
Pacific Islander alone (NH)	1	0	3	0.02%	0.00%	0.06%
Some Other Race alone (NH)	1	9	15	0.02%	0.17%	0.29%
Mixed Race or Multi-Racial (NH)	33	48	138	0.57%	0.89%	2.65%
Hispanic or Latino (any race)	35	73	95	0.60%	1.35%	1.83%
Total	5,802	5,417	5,205	100.00%	100.00%	100.00%

=== 2020 census ===
As of the 2020 census, the median age was 41.5 years. 22.6% of residents were under the age of 18 and 20.4% of residents were 65 years of age or older. For every 100 females there were 82.8 males, and for every 100 females age 18 and over there were 79.8 males age 18 and over.

The 2020 census counted 2,133 households in Bolivar, of which 29.0% had children under the age of 18 living in them. Of all households, 28.3% were married-couple households, 19.0% were households with a male householder and no spouse or partner present, and 47.0% were households with a female householder and no spouse or partner present. About 36.5% of all households were made up of individuals and 15.1% had someone living alone who was 65 years of age or older.

The 2020 census recorded 2,395 housing units, of which 10.9% were vacant. The homeowner vacancy rate was 1.4% and the rental vacancy rate was 7.2%.

According to the 2020 census, 92.9% of residents lived in urban areas, while 7.1% lived in rural areas.

Racial composition as of the 2020 census
Race	Number	Percent
White	1,627	31.3%
Black or African American	3,315	63.7%
American Indian and Alaska Native	5	0.1%
Asian	40	0.8%
Native Hawaiian and Other Pacific Islander	3	0.1%
Some other race	52	1.0%
Two or more races	163	3.1%
Hispanic or Latino (of any race)	95	1.8%

=== 2000 census ===
As of the census of 2000, there was a population of 5,802, with 2,161 households and 1,462 families residing in the city. The population density was 684.4 inhabitants per square mile (264.2/km^{2}). There were 2,352 housing units at an average density of 277.4 per square mile (107.1/km^{2}). The racial makeup of the city was 56.39% African American, 42.33% White, 0.50% Asian, 0.07% Native American, 0.02% Pacific Islander, 0.62% from two or more races, and 0.07% from other races. Hispanic or Latino of any race were 0.60% of the population.

There were 2,161 households, out of which 31.4% had children under the age of 18 living with them, 39.0% were married couples living together, 24.9% had a female householder with no husband present, and 32.3% were non-families. 30.0% of all households were made up of individuals, and 14.5% had someone living alone who was 65 years of age or older. The average household size was 2.45 and the average family size was 3.03.

In the city, the population was spread out, with 26.7% under the age of 18, 9.0% from 18 to 24, 25.6% from 25 to 44, 21.5% from 45 to 64, and 17.3% who were 65 years of age or older. The median age was 37 years. For every 100 females, there were 83.0 males. For every 100 females age 18 and over, there were 75.1 males.

The median income for a household in the city was $28,651, and the median income for a family was $35,298. Males had a median income of $30,442 versus $21,544 for females. The per capita income for the city was $14,973. About 19.5% of families and 23.2% of the population were below the poverty line, including 28.7% of those under age 18 and 28.6% of those age 65 or over.

== Climate ==
The climate in this area is characterized by relatively high temperatures and evenly distributed precipitation throughout the year. According to the Köppen Climate Classification system, Bolivar has a Humid subtropical climate, abbreviated "Cfa" on climate maps.

Climate data for Bolivar Water Works, Tennessee (1991–2020 normals, extremes 1894–present)
Month	Jan	Feb	Mar	Apr	May	Jun	Jul	Aug	Sep	Oct	Nov	Dec	Year
Record high °F (°C)	80 (27)	85 (29)	91 (33)	92 (33)	99 (37)	106 (41)	109 (43)	109 (43)	103 (39)	97 (36)	87 (31)	81 (27)	109 (43)
Mean maximum °F (°C)	69.7 (20.9)	72.9 (22.7)	80.2 (26.8)	85.3 (29.6)	88.7 (31.5)	93.6 (34.2)	96.1 (35.6)	96.4 (35.8)	92.9 (33.8)	86.5 (30.3)	78.3 (25.7)	70.2 (21.2)	97.6 (36.4)
Mean daily maximum °F (°C)	49.0 (9.4)	53.5 (11.9)	62.3 (16.8)	71.9 (22.2)	79.1 (26.2)	86.4 (30.2)	89.5 (31.9)	89.1 (31.7)	83.6 (28.7)	73.3 (22.9)	61.3 (16.3)	51.7 (10.9)	70.9 (21.6)
Daily mean °F (°C)	38.5 (3.6)	42.3 (5.7)	50.5 (10.3)	59.7 (15.4)	68.1 (20.1)	75.8 (24.3)	79.3 (26.3)	78.2 (25.7)	71.6 (22.0)	60.4 (15.8)	49.1 (9.5)	41.4 (5.2)	59.6 (15.3)
Mean daily minimum °F (°C)	28.1 (−2.2)	31.1 (−0.5)	38.7 (3.7)	47.6 (8.7)	57.1 (13.9)	65.3 (18.5)	69.0 (20.6)	67.2 (19.6)	59.6 (15.3)	47.5 (8.6)	37.0 (2.8)	31.1 (−0.5)	48.3 (9.1)
Mean minimum °F (°C)	11.7 (−11.3)	16.5 (−8.6)	22.8 (−5.1)	32.1 (0.1)	42.6 (5.9)	54.2 (12.3)	60.3 (15.7)	58.0 (14.4)	45.3 (7.4)	32.6 (0.3)	22.5 (−5.3)	17.1 (−8.3)	9.6 (−12.4)
Record low °F (°C)	−14 (−26)	−18 (−28)	6 (−14)	24 (−4)	29 (−2)	40 (4)	49 (9)	42 (6)	28 (−2)	20 (−7)	2 (−17)	−7 (−22)	−18 (−28)
Average precipitation inches (mm)	4.26 (108)	4.95 (126)	5.86 (149)	5.61 (142)	5.33 (135)	4.71 (120)	4.39 (112)	3.46 (88)	3.90 (99)	3.95 (100)	4.25 (108)	5.47 (139)	56.14 (1,426)
Average snowfall inches (cm)	0.5 (1.3)	0.6 (1.5)	0.4 (1.0)	0.1 (0.25)	0.0 (0.0)	0.0 (0.0)	0.0 (0.0)	0.0 (0.0)	0.0 (0.0)	0.0 (0.0)	0.0 (0.0)	0.1 (0.25)	1.7 (4.3)
Average precipitation days (≥ 0.01 in)	10.8	9.9	11.6	10.1	11.2	8.9	9.7	8.5	7.0	7.7	9.0	11.3	115.7
Average snowy days (≥ 0.1 in)	0.5	0.6	0.1	0.0	0.0	0.0	0.0	0.0	0.0	0.0	0.0	0.1	1.3
Source: NOAA

== Transportation ==
Bolivar is served by the county-owned William L. Whitehurst Field airport.

== Notable people ==
- Wayne Chism, former basketball player for the University of Tennessee Volunteers, lived in Bolivar and played high school basketball at Bolivar Central High School.
- Wayne Farris, known as Pro Wrestler The Honky Tonk Man, lived in Bolivar.
- Campbell Gray, Episcopal Bishop of Northern Indiana
- Odell Horton, United States district judge for the district of Western Tennessee
- Wayne Haddix, former National Football League defensive back, born in Bolivar and played high school football at nearby Middleton High School.
- Willie Kemp, former basketball player for the University of Memphis, lived in Bolivar and played high school basketball at Bolivar Central High School.
- Elizabeth Avery Meriwether, suffragist and writer
- Lynn Norment, journalist, editor and writer for Ebony magazine
- Joe Reaves, former basketball player for the Phoenix Suns, lived in Bolivar and played high school basketball at Bolivar Central High School.
- William E. Troutt, 19th president of Rhodes College

== See also ==
- Bolivar Female Academy
