= Tennessee House of Representatives 81st district =

State legislative district in Tennessee

Tennessee's 81st State House of Representatives district
- Map of Tennessee House districts with the 81st District shaded in red
Representative
Debra Moody; R–Covington
since 2013
- Demographics: 73.4% White; 18.5% Black; 3.4% Hispanic; 0.4% Asian; 3.7% Multiracial
- Population (2024): 66,974

The Tennessee House of Representatives 81st district is one of the 99 legislative districts in the lower house of the Tennessee General Assembly. The district is located in West Tennessee and covers Tipton County and the north of Haywood County. The district includes Covington, Munford, and Atoka. It also includes Brighton, Mason, Gilt Edge, Burlison, and Garland. The rest of the district is unincorporated and largely rural. Debra Moody has represented the district since 2013.

== Demographics ==
The Tennessee Comptroller estimates the population as of 2024 at 66,974.

- 73.4% of the district is White
- 18.5% of the district is Black
- 3.4% of the district is Hispanic
- 0.5% of the district is Asian
- 0.4% of the district is some other race alone
- 3.7% of the district is Two or more races

Detailed demographic information is also available through Census Reporter.

== History ==
The 88th Tennessee General Assembly was the first in which all districts were numbered. At this time, the 81st district was in Fayette, Haywood, and Tipton counties. From the 89th-92nd, it was made up of Fayette, Shelby, and Tipton counties. From the 93rd-101st GAs it was in Tipton and part of Fayette counties. From the 103rd-107th GAs, it was in Haywood and part of Tipton counties. From the 108th-112th, it was only Tipton County. Since the 113th General Assembly, it has been composed of Tipton and the north of Haywood counties.

== List of Representatives ==
Representative	Party	Years of Service	General Assembly	Hometown
Brett Giannini	Republican	2026-present		
Debra Moody	Republican	2013-2026	108th-114th	Covington
Jimmy Naifeh	Democratic	1975-2013	89th-107th	Covington
Albert A. Kelly	Republican	1973-1975	88th	Covington
