= National Register of Historic Places listings in Tipton County, Tennessee =

Location of Tipton County in Tennessee

This is a list of the National Register of Historic Places listings in Tipton County, Tennessee.

This is intended to be a complete list of the properties and districts on the National Register of Historic Places in Tipton County, Tennessee, United States. Latitude and longitude coordinates are provided for many National Register properties and districts; these locations may be seen together in a map.

There are 14 properties and districts listed on the National Register in the county.

Contents: Counties in Tennessee
Anderson – Bedford – Benton – Bledsoe – Blount – Bradley – Campbell – Cannon – Carroll – Carter – Cheatham – Chester – Claiborne – Clay – Cocke – Coffee – Crockett – Cumberland – Davidson – Decatur – DeKalb – Dickson – Dyer – Fayette – Fentress – Franklin – Gibson – Giles – Grainger – Greene – Grundy – Hamblen – Hamilton – Hancock – Hardeman – Hardin – Hawkins – Haywood – Henderson – Henry – Hickman – Houston – Humphreys – Jackson – Jefferson – Johnson – Knox – Lake – Lauderdale – Lawrence – Lewis – Lincoln – Loudon – Macon – Madison – Marion – Marshall – Maury – McMinn – McNairy – Meigs – Monroe – Montgomery – Moore – Morgan – Obion – Overton – Perry – Pickett – Polk – Putnam – Rhea – Roane – Robertson – Rutherford – Scott – Sequatchie – Sevier – Shelby – Smith – Stewart – Sullivan – Sumner – Tipton – Trousdale – Unicoi – Union – Van Buren – Warren – Washington – Wayne – Weakley – White – Williamson – Wilson

This National Park Service list is complete through NPS recent listings posted May 29, 2026.

== Current listings ==
	Name on the Register	Image	Date listed	Location	City or town	Description
1	Bozo's Hot Pit Bar-B-Q	Bozo's Hot Pit Bar-B-Q	March 27, 2018 (#100002264)	342 US 70; 35°24′37″N 89°32′23″W	Mason	
2	Canaan Baptist Church		November 30, 1999 (#99001457)	211 N. Main St. 35°33′34″N 89°38′20″W	Covington	
3	Charleston United Methodist Church and Cemetery	Charleston United Methodist Church and Cemetery	July 17, 2002 (#02000811)	Covington-Stanton Rd. 35°29′43″N 89°30′34″W	Charleston vicinity	
4	Coca-Cola Bottling Plant	Coca-Cola Bottling Plant	February 7, 1997 (#97000038)	126 U.S. Route 51, S. 35°33′51″N 89°38′58″W	Covington	
5	Hotel Lindo	Hotel Lindo	December 27, 1982 (#82001733)	116 W. Liberty St. 35°33′52″N 89°38′48″W	Covington	
6	Mt. Carmel Presbyterian Church	Mt. Carmel Presbyterian Church	July 12, 1984 (#84003716)	Mt. Carmel Rd. 35°29′49″N 89°38′53″W	Covington vicinity	
7	Oak Hill Farm	Oak Hill Farm	March 27, 2013 (#13000125)	1280 Keeling Rd. 35°27′21″N 89°31′06″W	Stanton vicinity	
8	Old Trinity Episcopal Church	Old Trinity Episcopal Church	May 21, 1997 (#97000039)	Charleston Rd., 4 miles (6.4 km) northeast of Mason; 35°27′21″N 89°31′06″W	Mason vicinity	
9	Rhodes House		April 30, 1980 (#80003875)	Southeast of Brighton on Clopton-Gainesville Rd. 35°26′51″N 89°38′28″W	Brighton vicinity	
10	Ruffin Theater	Ruffin Theater	March 26, 1992 (#92000248)	113 W. Pleasant Ave. 35°33′43″N 89°38′50″W	Covington	
11	St. Matthew's Episcopal Church	St. Matthew's Episcopal Church	August 16, 1977 (#77001297)	Munford St. 35°33′46″N 89°38′54″W	Covington	
12	South College Street Historic District	South College Street Historic District	February 7, 1997 (#97000037)	600, 700, and 800 blocks of S. College St. 35°33′45″N 89°38′55″W	Covington	
13	South Main Street Historic District		May 29, 1992 (#92000427)	Roughly bounded by S. Main St., Sherrod Ave., S. Maple St., and Sanford and Lauderdale Aves. 35°33′35″N 89°38′44″W	Covington	
14	Trinity Church		March 15, 1984 (#84003719)	Main St. 35°24′45″N 89°32′04″W	Mason	

== Former listings ==
	Name on the Register	Image	Date listed	Date removed	Location	City or town	Description
1	Dr. Thomas H. Price House	Dr. Thomas H. Price House	June 13, 2016 (#15000118)	October 28, 2021	620 N. Main St. 35°34′15″N 89°38′46″W	Covington	Demolished in 2019

== See also ==
- List of National Historic Landmarks in Tennessee
- National Register of Historic Places listings in Tennessee
