= Kent Williams (politician) =

American politician

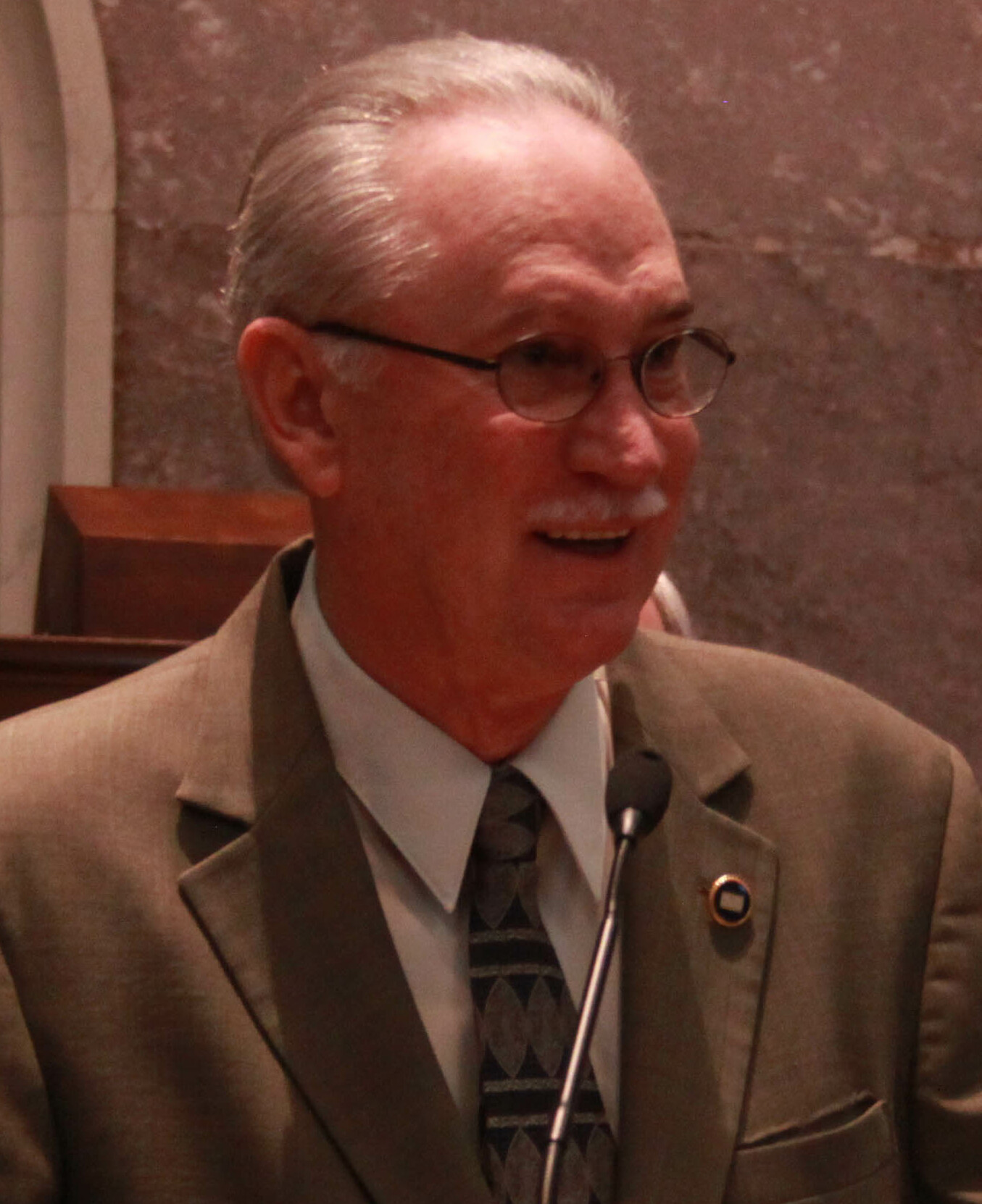
- Williams in 2014

80th Speaker of the Tennessee House of Representatives
- In office January 13, 2009 – January 11, 2011
- Preceded by: Jimmy Naifeh
- Succeeded by: Beth Harwell

Member of the Tennessee House of Representatives from the 4th district
- In office January 9, 2007 – January 13, 2015
- Preceded by: Jerome Cochran
- Succeeded by: John Holsclaw Jr.

Personal details
- Born: June 23, 1949 (age 77) Carter County, Tennessee
- Party: Independent (self-proclaimed Carter County Republican) (2009—present); Republican (until 2009)
- Spouse: Gayle Williams
- Education: Unaka High School
- Occupation: Restaurateur, Farmer

Kent Williams (born June 23, 1949) was a member of the Tennessee House of Representatives, first elected in 2006 to the Tennessee House of Representative as a Republican from House District 4 (then entirely Carter County in 2006 and reelected to the House in 2008.

Williams was the Speaker of the Tennessee House of Representatives during the 106th Tennessee General Assembly (2009—2010). During January 2009, Williams, together with all 49 House Democrats (including former Elizabethton resident Rep. Gary Odom), cast the last tie-breaking vote from the floor of the Tennessee House of Representatives to become the first elected Republican Speaker of the Tennessee House of Representatives since 1969.

The Tennessee Republican Party State Executive Committee, still stinging over the unanticipated election defeat of Rep. Jason Mumpower as the next Speaker of the House, voted to eject Williams as a bona fide member of the Tennessee Republican Party. In response, Speaker Williams then chose "Carter County Republican" as his new party designation and was later reelected to a third term in the Tennessee House of Representatives by Carter County voters over the Republican Party primary winner.

Williams was re-elected to the House as an independent in 2010 and 2012. He did not stand for re-election to the Speakership. On August 29, 2013, Williams announced he would not run for re-election in 2014.

== Early life, education, and business career ==
Williams was born in Carter County, Tennessee in 1949. His father worked as a laborer in one of the Elizabethton rayon mills. His family lived in Dale Hollow in the Sadie section of Stoney Creek, at the foot of Holston Mountain. Williams graduated from Unaka High School.

He left Carter County to find work in Michigan, where he worked in the kitchen of a large hospital and where he met his future wife, Gayle. Williams later returned to Elizabethton, where the couple raised their four sons. Williams is a farmer and owns a restaurant in Elizabethton. He was previously a vice president of Steak Houses of Homestead Inc. and Family Steak Houses of Miami Inc.

== Early political career ==
Early in his career he worked for the Tennessee Department of Transportation, but because he had been hired during a Republican administration, he lost that job in 1975 after Democrat Ray Blanton became governor.

== Tennessee House of Representatives ==
=== Elections ===
Williams first ran for the Tennessee House of Representatives in 2006. He challenged incumbent Republican Jerome Cochran of Tennessee's 4th house district. He chastised Cochran for a lack of progress in state-funded projects in Carter County. He defeated him in the August primary 54%-46%. In November, he won the general election unopposed.

In 2008, Cochran challenged Williams to a rematch. Williams defeated him again, this time by a larger margin, 65%-35%. In November, he won re-election to a second term, defeating Independent candidate Priscilla Steele 83%-17%.

After being ousted by the Republican Party of Tennessee, Williams ran for re-election as an Independent, or, as he called it, a Carter County Republican. In November, he defeated Republican nominee Jerome Cochran, in the second rematch, 57%-43% (no Democrat filed to run here). In the sweeping victory of the Republican Party statewide, he would not seek re-election as Speaker and would continue to caucus with Republicans. He was succeeded as Speaker by Republican Beth Harwell.

In 2012, he won re-election to a third term, defeating Republican nominee Thomas Gray 54%-46%.

=== Tenure ===
==== Speaker ====
Williams was elected as speaker of the Tennessee House on January 13, 2009, in a surprising divergence from the Republican party's accepted plan for succession. Democrats, who had lost the majority in the House for the first time since 1969, threw their support behind Williams as a means of keeping House Majority Leader Jason Mumpower out of the office. Williams, one of 50 Republicans in the 99-seat House, voted for himself alongside the assembly's 49 Democrats to clinch the position, defeating Mumpower by a vote of 50 to 49. Outgoing speaker Jimmy Naifeh instructed the House clerk to depart from the normal practice of conducting a roll call of the members in alphabetical order, instead calling first on the Democrats, then on the Republicans. This allowed Williams to vote last, so that before he voted he knew that his vote for himself would be the deciding vote. After the vote he was booed and called a "traitor." Subsequently, Williams voted with the Democrats to elect Democrat Lois DeBerry as speaker pro-tem over Republican Beth Harwell.

==== Voting record ====
Williams is considered a moderate by Tennessee Republican standards. He was one of seven Republicans who in 2007 had voted for Democrat Naifeh as speaker of the 105th General Assembly. He explained to a friend that if he "wanted to get anything done in Carter County [he] had to vote for Jimmy Naifeh."

After the November 2008 election in which Republicans won a one-seat majority in the House, Williams had joined the other 49 Republicans in the House in publicly pledging to vote for a Republican for speaker. He also had privately promised to vote for Mumpower. After voting with the Democrats, Williams acknowledged that he had broken a promise, but said that his votes were made in the best interest of the state. After his election as speaker, the House Republicans expelled Williams from their caucus. The party's state executive committee discussed removing him from the party. On February 9, 2009, the Tennessee Republican Party ousted Williams from the party. Williams said he had no intention of joining the Democratic Party of Tennessee, but continues to personally consider himself a Republican.

=== Committee assignments ===
- Business and Utilities
- State Government

== See also ==
- List of American politicians who switched parties in office

Political offices
Preceded by Jimmy Naifeh	Speaker of the Tennessee House of Representatives; 2009–2011	Succeeded by Beth Harwell
