= South College Street Historic District =

South College Street Historic District may refer to:

- South College Street Historic District (Brandon, Mississippi), listed on the National Register of Historic Places in Rankin County, Mississippi
- South College Street Historic District (Covington, Tennessee), listed on the National Register of Historic Places in Tipton County, Tennessee
