= Solomon Davis =

American gridiron football player (born 2000)

No. 13 – Toronto Argonauts
- Position: Wide receiver
- Roster status: Active
- CFL status: American

Personal information
- Born: October 11, 2000 (age 26); Brighton, Tennessee, U.S.
- Listed height: 6 ft 1 in (1.85 m)
- Listed weight: 180 lb (82 kg)

Career information
- High school: Brighton
- College: Valparaiso (2019–2023); Central Michigan (2024)
- NFL draft: 2025: undrafted

Career history
- Toronto Argonauts (2026–present)

Awards and highlights
- 2× First-team All-PFL (2022, 2023)
- Stats at CFL.ca

Solomon Davis (born October 11, 2000) is an American professional football wide receiver for the Toronto Argonauts of the Canadian Football League (CFL). He played college football for the Valparaiso Beacons and Central Michigan Chippewas.

== Early life ==
Davis was born on October 11, 2000, in Brighton, Tennessee. He attended Brighton High School where he only played in one year of varsity football. Davis committed to play college football at Valparaiso University.

== College career ==
Davis played college football for the Valparaiso Beacons from 2019 to 2023 and Central Michigan Chippewas in 2024. In 34 games at Valpo, he had 94 receptions for 1,415 yards and ten touchdowns with 82 rushing yards and a touchdown. Davis was a two-time first-team All-PFL recipient in 2022 and 2023.

Davis transferred to Central Michigan University for the 2024 season and played in 12 games. He had 19 receptions for 2350 yards and two touchdowns with 24 rushing yards.

== Professional career ==
Pre-draft measurables
Height	Weight	Arm length	Hand span	Wingspan	40-yard dash	10-yard split	20-yard split	20-yard shuttle	Three-cone drill	Vertical jump	Broad jump	Bench press
5 ft 10 in (1.78 m)	179 lb (81 kg)	31 in (0.79 m)	8 5/8 in (0.22 m)	6 ft 3 1/4 in (1.91 m)	4.45 s	1.53 s	2.55 s	4.47 s	7.22 s	33 1/2 in (0.85 m)	10 ft 1 in (3.07 m)	2 reps
All values from Pro day

After not being selected in the 2025 NFL draft, Davis signed with the Toronto Argonauts of the Canadian Football League (CFL) as an undrafted free agent. On May 31, 2026, he was signed to the practice roster. On September 11, he was elevated to the active roster and made his CFL debut the following day.
