= Jimmy Naifeh =

American politician (born 1939)

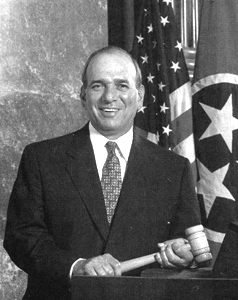

79th Speaker of the Tennessee House of Representatives
- In office January 8, 1991 – January 13, 2009
- Governor: Ned McWherter; Don Sundquist; Phil Bredesen
- Preceded by: Ed Murray
- Succeeded by: Kent Williams

Member of the Tennessee House of Representatives from the 81st District
- In office January 14, 1975 – January 8, 2013
- Preceded by: Albert A. Kelley
- Succeeded by: Debra Moody

Personal details
- Born: June 16, 1939 (age 87) Tipton County, Tennessee, U.S.
- Party: Democratic
- Education: University of Tennessee

James O. Naifeh (born June 16, 1939) is an American politician and member of the Democratic Party from the State of Tennessee. He served as the Speaker of the Tennessee House of Representatives from 1991 to 2009, serving longer in that position than anyone else in Tennessee history.

== Early life ==
Naifeh is a second-generation Lebanese-American from Covington, a town north of Memphis. His family was in the grocery business. After graduating from the University of Tennessee, Naifeh served in the United States Army as an infantry officer.

== Political career ==
=== Election to the House ===
He was first elected to the Tennessee House of Representatives in 1974, and was Speaker from 1991 to 2009. He represented House District 81, which at the time included most of Tipton County and all of Haywood County. Prior to his election as Speaker served in other positions in the Democratic Caucus such as chairman of the Rules Committee, Majority Floor Leader, and chairman of the Rural West Tennessee Democratic Caucus.

=== Marriage ===
From 1995 to 2008, Naifeh was married to Betty Anderson, considered by many Tennessee political observers to be the most influential lobbyist in the state.

=== Contested 2004 election ===
In December 2002, African American physician Jesse Cannon, a Republican and Naifeh's personal doctor, announced that he would oppose Naifeh in 2004. On November 2, 2004, Naifeh defeated Cannon by a margin of approximately 58% to 42%.

=== Republican majority in 2008 ===
In the 2008 November elections Republicans won the majority of the state House, winning 50 of the 99 seats, with the Democrats holding 49. This is the first time the GOP has had a majority in the Tennessee House since 1971, and the first time both House and Senate have had Republican majorities since Reconstruction. This ended Naifeh's long term as Speaker, but the Republicans' narrow majority in the House did not allow them to elect their preferred Speaker. While 49 Republicans voted for Jason Mumpower, the 49 Democrats and Republican Representative Kent Williams voted for Williams to succeed Naifeh as Speaker.

Naifeh, who was chairing the House for the last time, helped to engineer Williams' election by instructing the House clerk to depart from the normal practice of conducting a roll call of the members in alphabetical order, instead calling first on the Democrats, then on the Republicans. This allowed Williams to vote last, so that before he voted he knew that his vote for himself would be the deciding vote.

In 2009, the Tennessee General Assembly established the Jimmy Naifeh Center for Effective Leadership within the University of Tennessee Institute for Public Service as a tribute to Naifeh’s service to Tennessee and his contributions to public leadership. The center provides leadership and professional development programs for elected and appointed government officials and other public-sector leaders.

=== Retirement ===
On March 8, 2012; Naifeh announced he would not run for a 20th term in November.

Political offices
Preceded by Ed Murray	Speaker of the Tennessee House of Representatives; 1991-January 13, 2009	Succeeded by Kent Williams
