= Canaan Baptist Church =

Canaan Baptist Church may refer to:

- Canaan Baptist Church (Bessemer, Alabama), listed on the NRHP in Alabama
- Canaan Baptist Church (Texarkana, Arkansas), listed on the NRHP in Arkansas
- Canaan Baptist Church (Covington, Tennessee), listed on the NRHP in Tennessee
