= Shane Elam =

American football player (born 1977)

No. 59
- Position: Linebacker

Personal information
- Born: November 6, 1977 (age 49); Covington, Tennessee, U.S.
- Listed height: 6 ft 1 in (1.85 m)
- Listed weight: 240 lb (109 kg)

Career information
- High school: Covington
- College: Tennessee (1996); Ole Miss (1997–2000)
- NFL draft: 2001: undrafted

Career history
- San Francisco 49ers (2001); Atlanta Falcons (2001)*; Houston Texans (2002)*; San Francisco 49ers (2002)*
- * Offseason or practice squad member only

Career NFL statistics
- Games played: 4
- Tackles: 1
- Stats at Pro Football Reference

Shane Farrar Elam (born November 6, 1977) is an American former professional football linebacker who played in the National Football League (NFL) for the San Francisco 49ers, Atlanta Falcons and Houston Texans. He played college football for the Tennessee Volunteers and Ole Miss Rebels.

== Early life ==
Elam was born on November 6, 1977, in Covington, Tennessee. He attended Covington High School in Covington.

== College career ==
Elam played college football for the Tennessee Volunteers in 1996 and Ole Miss Rebels in 1997 to 2000. He walked-on to the team at Tennessee before he transferred to Ole Miss, sitting out the 1997 season. In 1998, Elam had an 87-yard pick-six against Vanderbilt. He was named a team captain for the 2000 season.

== Professional career ==
=== San Francisco 49ers (first stint) ===
After going undrafted in the 2001 NFL draft, Elam signed with the San Francisco 49ers as an undrafted free agent. He played in four games, where he made one special teams tackle against the Carolina Panthers. On October 30, Elam was released by the team.

=== Atlanta Falcons ===
On November 27, 2001, Elam was signed by the Atlanta Falcons. He spent the season on the practice squad.

=== Houston Texans ===
On April 26, 2002, Elam was signed to the Houston Texans. On May 21, he was released by the team.

=== San Francisco 49ers (second stint) ===
On May 31, 2002, Elam was claimed off waivers by the 49ers. He was released on August 27.
