= Carmel Presbyterian Church =

Carmel Presbyterian Church may refer to:

- Carmel Presbyterian Church (Natchez, Mississippi), listed on the NRHP in Mississippi
- Mt. Carmel Presbyterian Church (Covington, Tennessee), listed on the NRHP in Tennessee
