= Rhodes House (Brighton, Tennessee) =

- U.S. National Register of Historic Places
- Location within Tennessee Location within the United States
- Nearest city: Brighton, Tennessee
- Area: 21 acres (8.5 ha)
- Built: 1860
- Architectural style: Greek Revival
- NRHP reference No.: 80003875
- Added to NRHP: April 30, 1980

The Rhodes House is a historic house near Brighton, Tennessee, U.S. It was built in 1860 for Soloman A. Rhodes, a planter who inherited the land from his parents. Rhodes was married twice, and he had ten children.

The house is two stories, with a one-story ell, and is basically Greek Revival in style. It has been listed on the National Register of Historic Places since April 30, 1980.
