= Dalton Rushing =

American baseball player (born 2001)

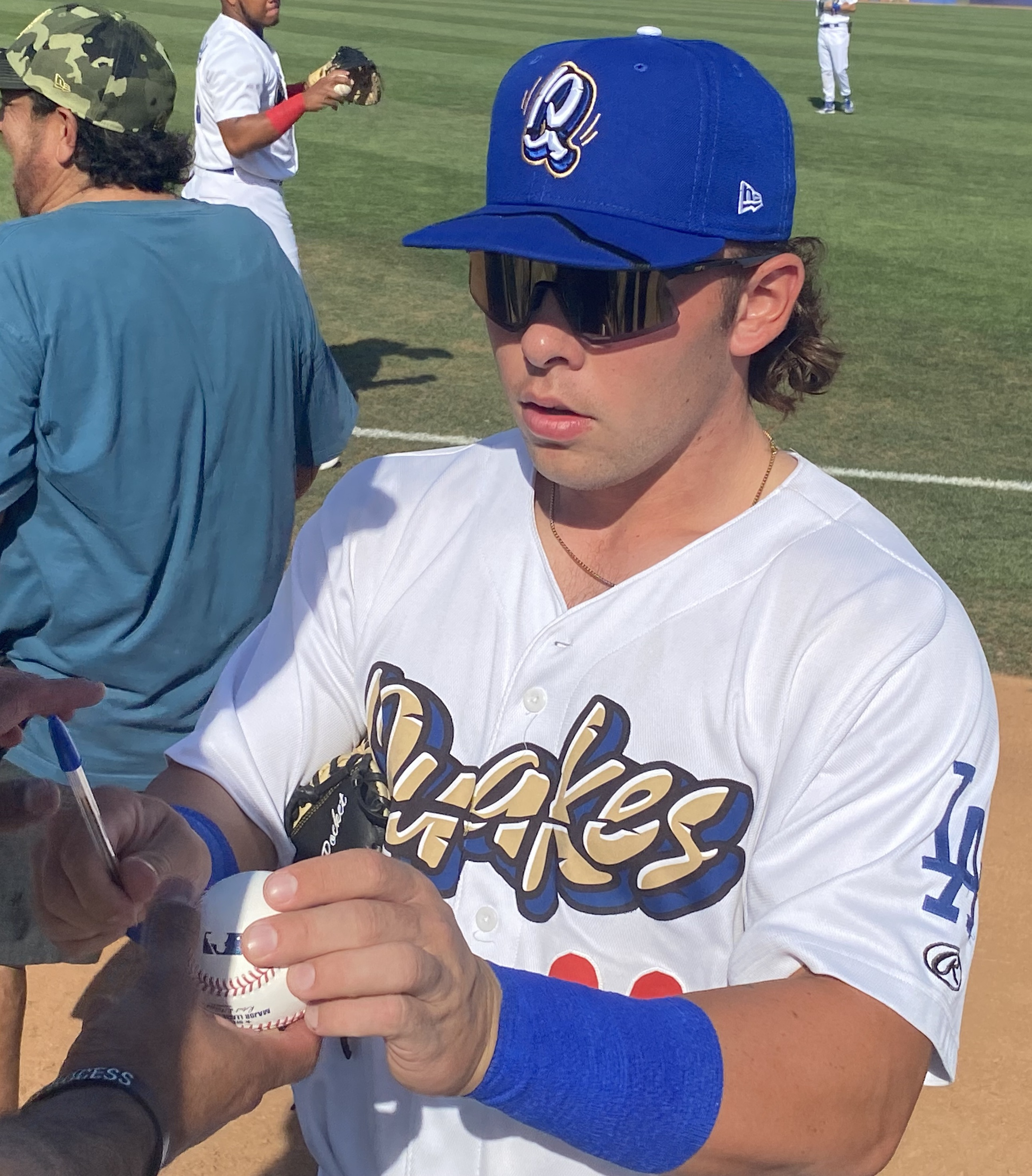
- Rushing with the Rancho Cucamonga Quakes in 2022

Los Angeles Dodgers – No. 68
- Catcher
- Born: February 21, 2001 (age 25); Memphis, Tennessee, U.S.
- Bats: Left Throws: Right

MLB debut
- May 15, 2025, for the Los Angeles Dodgers

MLB statistics (through 2026 season)
- Batting average: .230
- Home runs: 16
- Runs batted in: 60
- Stats at Baseball Reference

Teams
- Los Angeles Dodgers (2025–present)

Career highlights and awards
- World Series champion (2025)

Dalton Wayne Rushing (born February 21, 2001) is an American professional baseball catcher for the Los Angeles Dodgers of Major League Baseball (MLB). He played college baseball for the Louisville Cardinals and was selected by the Dodgers in the second round of the 2022 MLB draft. He made his MLB debut in 2025.

== Early life and amateur career ==
Rushing attended Brighton High School in Brighton, Tennessee, where he played baseball. As a senior in 2019, he batted .491 with 11 home runs and 46 RBI and earned All-State honors. He went undrafted in the 2019 Major League Baseball draft and enrolled at the University of Louisville to play college baseball.

Due to Henry Davis being named Louisville's starting catcher in 2020, Rushing began playing first base and started six games for the season before it was cancelled due to the COVID-19 pandemic. He appeared in 28 games in 2021, batting .254 with four home runs and 14 RBI. After the season, he played in the Cape Cod Baseball League with the Bourne Braves with whom he batted .314 with six home runs over 118 at-bats and was named a league all-star. After Davis was selected first overall in the 2021 Major League Baseball draft, Rushing was named Louisville's starting catcher for the 2022 season. He finished the season having appeared in 64 games, slashing .310/.470/.686 with 23 home runs, 62 RBI, and 16 doubles. He was named an All-American, and ended the season as a top prospect for the upcoming MLB draft.

== Professional career ==
Rushing was selected by the Los Angeles Dodgers in the second round with the 40th pick of the 2022 Major League Baseball draft. He signed with the Dodgers for a $1,959,390 signing bonus on July 30, 2022.

Rushing made his professional debut with the Arizona Complex League Dodgers and was promoted to the Rancho Cucamonga Quakes after two games. He played in 28 games for the Quakes, hitting .424 with eight home runs and 30 RBI. At the end of the regular season, he was promoted to the Great Lakes Loons so he could play in the Midwest League playoffs. He drove in three runs in three games in the playoffs and had two hits in nine at-bats with two walks and two hit by pitches. Rushing remained with the Loons for the 2023 season, where he hit .228 in 89 games with 15 homers and 53 RBI. He was also selected to represent the Dodgers at the 2023 All-Star Futures Game.

Rushing was selected to participate in the inaugural "Spring Breakout" minor league showcase during spring training 2024. He began the season with the Double–A Tulsa Drillers and was promoted to the Triple–A Oklahoma City Baseball Club in August 2024, where it was announced that Rushing would play primarily as a left fielder. Between the two levels, he played in 114 games, with a .271 batting average, 26 home runs and 85 RBI. Rushing was selected as the Dodgers Branch Rickey Minor League Player of the Year for 2024.

Rushing began the 2025 season with Oklahoma City, where he hit .308 with five home runs and 17 RBI in 31 games. On May 14, he was selected to the 40-man roster and promoted to the major leagues for the first time, making his MLB debut the following day as the starting catcher against the Athletics. Rushing recorded his first MLB hit in his second plate appearance, off Jason Alexander. On May 31, Rushing hit his first career major league home run off of Pablo Reyes of the New York Yankees. In 53 games, he batted .204 with four home runs and 24 RBI. Rushing made one postseason appearance for the Dodgers, striking out as a pinch hitter in the ninth inning of Game 3 of the National League Division Series, before being removed from the roster the following series.

On April 6, 2026, Rushing had four hits (including two home runs) in a game against the Toronto Blue Jays. On April 15, he hit his first career grand slam, against the New York Mets. On July 6, Rushing hit a walk-off single against the Colorado Rockies. It was the Dodgers' 60th win of the season. Rushing missed time during the 2026 season due to a partial UCL tear in his right elbow. He appeared in 80 games and batted .246 with 12 home runs and 36 RBI. Rushing underwent elbow surgery in the offseason that would keep him out of action at the start of the following season.

== Personal life ==
Rushing's brother, Logan, plays college baseball at the University of Memphis.

== See also ==
- All-Star Futures Game all-time roster
