= Michael Murphy (Tennessee politician) =

American politician

Michael D. Murphy (born 9-14-43) is a businessman from Nashville, Tennessee who served as a Democratic member of the Tennessee House of Representatives from 1971 to 1986 (the 87th, 88th, 89th, 90th, 91st, 92nd, 93rd & 94th General Assemblies. He was succeeded by fellow Democrat Gary Odom.
