= Brett Giannini =

American politician

Member-elect of the Tennessee House of Representatives from the 81st district
- Assuming office January 12, 2027
- Succeeding: Debra Moody

Personal details
- Party: Republican
- Website: Campaign website

Brett Giannini is an American politician. A member of the Republican Party, he is the member-elect for the Tennessee House of Representatives for the 81st district. He was elected at the 2026 election.
