= Tipton, Tennessee =

Neighborhood of Atoka, United States

- Neighborhood
- Location within Tennessee Location within the United States
- Coordinates: 35°24′49″N 89°49′11″W
- Country: United States
- State: Tennessee
- County: Tipton
- Elevation: 358 ft (109 m)
- Time zone: UTC-6 (Central (CST))
  - Summer (DST): UTC-5 (CDT)
- ZIP code: 38071
- Area code: 901
- GNIS feature ID: 1272678

Tipton is a neighborhood in the town of Atoka in Tipton County, Tennessee, United States, which was previously a distinct, unincorporated community. Tipton has its own post office with ZIP code 38071.
