= Ed Murray (Tennessee politician) =

American politician

78th Speaker of the Tennessee House of Representatives
- In office January 13, 1987 – January 8, 1991
- Preceded by: Ned McWherter
- Succeeded by: Jimmy Naifeh

Member of the Tennessee House of Representatives from the 39th district
- In office 1971–1991
- Preceded by: Pat Lynch
- Succeeded by: Bill Rigsby

Personal details
- Born: August 16, 1928 Decherd, Tennessee, U.S.
- Died: May 29, 2009 (aged 80) The Villages, Florida, U.S.
- Party: Democratic

Charles Edward Murray (August 16, 1928 – May 29, 2009) was speaker of the Tennessee House of Representatives for two terms, from 1987 to 1991.

A Democrat and a native of Decherd, Tennessee, he was widely regarded as a protégé of Ned Ray McWherter, the previous speaker, who became Tennessee governor in 1987.

A native of Decherd, Tennessee, Murray attended Franklin County public schools, the University of the South, Middle Tennessee State University, and Nashville School of Law. He worked as a lawyer.

He was first elected to the state House in 1970, representing the 39th District, and served from 1971 to 1991. After Ned McWherter won the 1986 gubernatorial election, Murray was voted on January 13, 1987, to serve as Speaker of the House. He did not seek re-election in 1990, and was subsequently appointed claims commissioner for Middle Tennessee by McWherter. He retired from that office in 1995.

Murray died on May 29, 2009, in The Villages, Florida, where he had made his home since 2004.

Political offices
Preceded by Ned McWherter	Speaker of the Tennessee House of Representatives; 1987-1991	Succeeded by Jimmy Naifeh
