= Debra Moody =

American politician (born 1956)

Member of the Tennessee House of Representatives from the 81st district
- In office January 8, 2013 – November 3, 2026
- Preceded by: Jimmy Naifeh
- Succeeded by: Brett Giannini

Personal details
- Born: May 28, 1956 (age 70)
- Party: Republican
- Children: 4
- Education: Arkansas State University; University of Memphis
- Website: House website

Debra Moody (born May 28, 1956) is an American politician who served as a Republican member of the Tennessee House of Representatives representing the 81st district, from 2013 to 2026.

== Education ==
Moody attended Arkansas State University and the University of Memphis.

== Elections ==
- 2012 When District 81 incumbent Democratic Representative Jimmy Naifeh retired and left the seat open, Moody ran in the four-way August 2, 2012 Republican Primary, winning with 2,578 votes (44.5%) and won the three-way November 6, 2012 General election with 12,690 votes (55.8%) against Democratic nominee Conneye Albright and Independent candidate Tommy Hill.

== Political career ==
In 2023, Moody supported a resolution to expel three Democratic lawmakers from the legislature for violating decorum rules. The expulsion was widely characterized as unprecedented.
