= Peckerwood Point, Tennessee =

- Unincorporated community
- Location within Tennessee Location within the United States
- Coordinates: 35°27′6″N 89°52′55″W
- Country: United States
- State: Tennessee
- County: Tipton
- Elevation: 443 ft (135 m)
- Time zone: UTC-6 (Central (CST))
  - Summer (DST): UTC-5 (CDT)
- GNIS feature ID: 1315689

Peckerwood Point is an unincorporated community in Tipton County, Tennessee, United States.
