= Jerome Cochran =

American politician (born 1971)

Member of the Tennessee House of Representatives from the 4th district
- In office January 14, 2003 – January 9, 2007
- Preceded by: Ralph Cole
- Succeeded by: Kent Williams

Personal details
- Born: November 17, 1971 (age 55)
- Party: Republican
- Spouse: Married
- Children: 3
- Education: University of Tennessee (BA); Regent University School of Law (JD)
- Website: House website

Jerome Cochran (born November 17, 1971) is a Tennessee lawyer and Republican politician who served for two terms in the Tennessee House of Representatives. He was elected as a member of the Tennessee House of Representatives to the 103rd and 104th General Assembly for the 4th District, which at the time encompassed the entirety of Carter County.

== Background ==
Jerome Cochran was born in Saigon on November 17, 1971. He received a B.A. at the University of Tennessee in Knoxville and later earned a J.D. after attending the Regent University School of Law that was founded by The 700 Club founder Pat Robertson.

Cochran was admitted to the Tennessee Bar Association and works in Elizabethton as an attorney with the law offices of David Crockett Attorney-At-Law. Since 2015, he has been an administrative law judge in Nashville.

== Legislative service ==
Cochran was first elected to the House in 2002. He was the first American of Vietnamese descent ever elected to the Tennessee legislature. He was a member of the Children and Family Committee, the Judiciary Committee, the Domestic Relations Committee, the Constitutional Protections Subcommittee, and the Civil Practice & Procedure Subcommittee.

In the 2004 Carter County Republican Primary, he ran against John B. Holsclaw, Sr., a former tax assessor for Carter County, and was re-nominated with 3,942 votes over Holsclaw's 2,089. He ran unopposed in the subsequent 2004 general election.

Among the 2006 legislation sponsored by Cochran in the Tennessee General Assembly was HB2921 authorizing (upon passage) "...the display, in county and municipal public buildings..., of replicas of historical documents and writings" including the Ten Commandments religious displays found contrary to the 2005 U.S. Supreme Court affirmation of McCreary County v. American Civil Liberties Union of Kentucky.

Cochran introduced HB2921 in the Tennessee House Constitutional Protections subcommittee --- of which he was a standing member --- and his HB2921 legislation died peacefully within subcommittee.

Cochran lost the August 2006 Republican primary election to challenger Kent Williams of Elizabethton, who went on to win the general election.

Cochran also unsuccessfully challenged Williams in a rematch in the August 2008 Republican primary. Williams cited the former representative's failure in bringing state tax dollars back into Carter County, including a stalled major state highway project (Northern Connector), a state park camp ground project, and a TWRA cold-water trout hatchery within both Elizabethton and Carter County, and Cochran's legislative assistance heavily favoring special interest groups as reasons for Carter County voters not to return him to the Tennessee General Assembly.

Cochran won the August 2010 Republican primary against Priscilla G. Steele for the right to run against Williams, who ran as an independent {"Carter County Republican") candidate) in the general election after Williams was stripped of his Republican credentials following his joining with the Democrats to elect himself Speaker of the House in January 2009. Cochran lost to Williams, garnering only 42% of the vote (there was no Democrat in the race).

== Sources ==
- Jerome Cochran's profile at the Tennessee General Assembly website
- "Cochran -- Ready for Nashville" Elizabethton Star. Kathy Helms-Hughes. July 5, 2005.
- Tennessee Court of Criminal Appeals case of State of Tennessee v. Raymond K. McCrary referencing Cochran working with David Crockett
- 2004 Republican primary results
- 2004 Tennessee House election results
- An Elizabethton Star article on the 2004 elections
- Victor in 4th vows action on stalled projects
