= Hotel Lindo =

Historic hotel building in Covington, Tennessee

- U.S. National Register of Historic Places
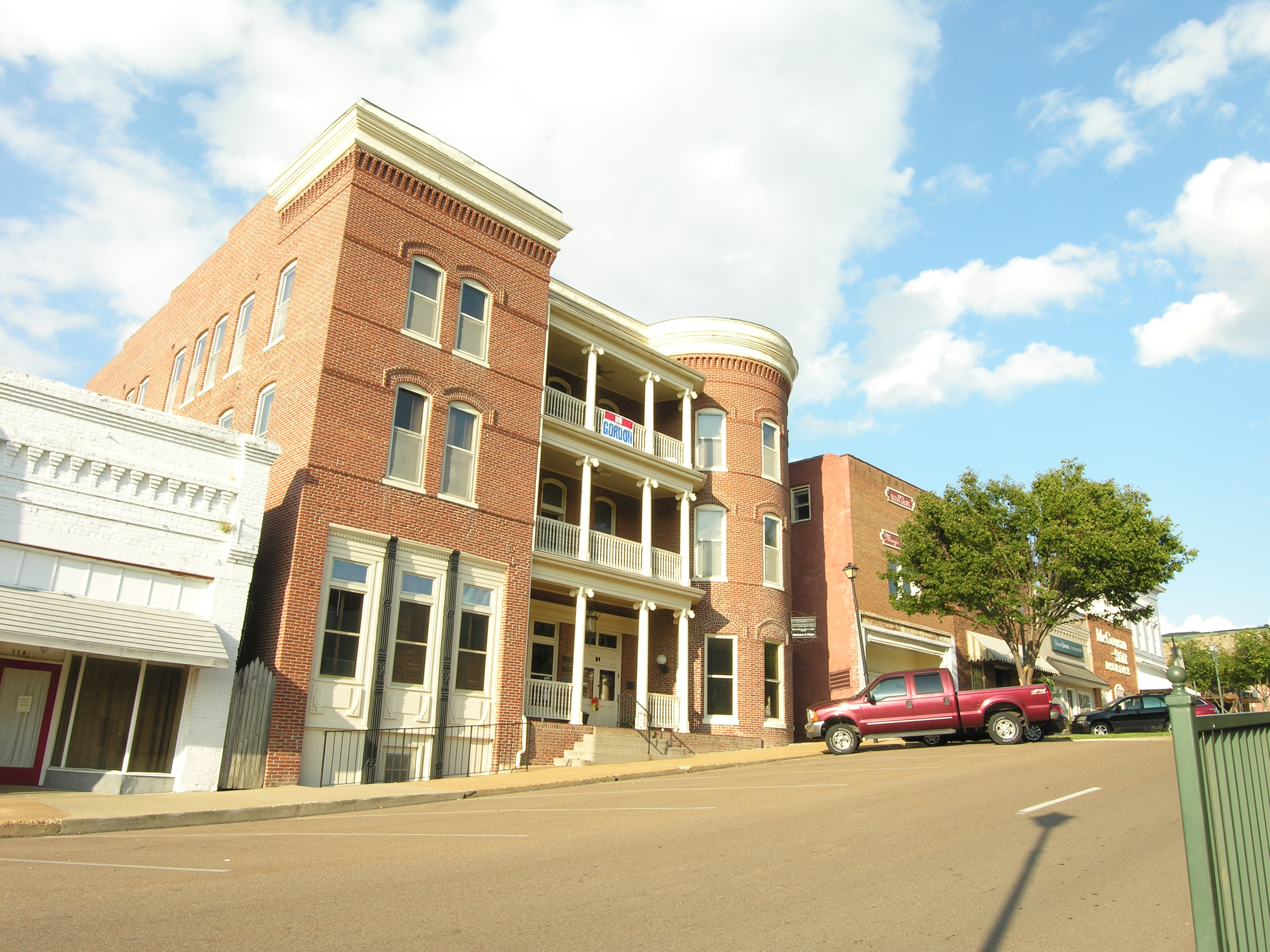

- Location within Tennessee
- Location: 116 W. Liberty St., Covington, Tennessee
- Coordinates: 35.56482°N 89.64694°W
- Area: Less than one acre
- Built: 1901
- Built by: Richard B. Shelton
- Architect: Richard B. Shelton
- Architectural style: Italianate, Romanesque Revival
- NRHP reference No.: 82001733
- Added to NRHP: December 27, 1982

The Hotel Lindo is a historic former hotel building at 116 W. Liberty Street in Covington, Tennessee. It was built in 1901 and was designed and constructed by Richard B. Shelton. The building was listed on the National Register of Historic Places on December 27, 1982.

== Description ==
The building occupies a footprint of approximately 60 by 98 feet (18 by 30 m). The nomination describes it as unusual for having two projecting corner towers on its primary facade: one circular, with Romanesque Revival styling, and one rectangular. The circular tower was formerly topped with a domed roof and the rectangular tower with a hipped roof; both roof elements were removed in 1970.

The hotel stands near the Tipton County Courthouse, on the courthouse-square block.

== See also ==
- National Register of Historic Places listings in Tipton County, Tennessee
- Tipton County Courthouse (Covington, Tennessee)
