= Mt. Carmel Presbyterian Church (Covington, Tennessee) =

Historic church in Tennessee, United States

- U.S. National Register of Historic Places
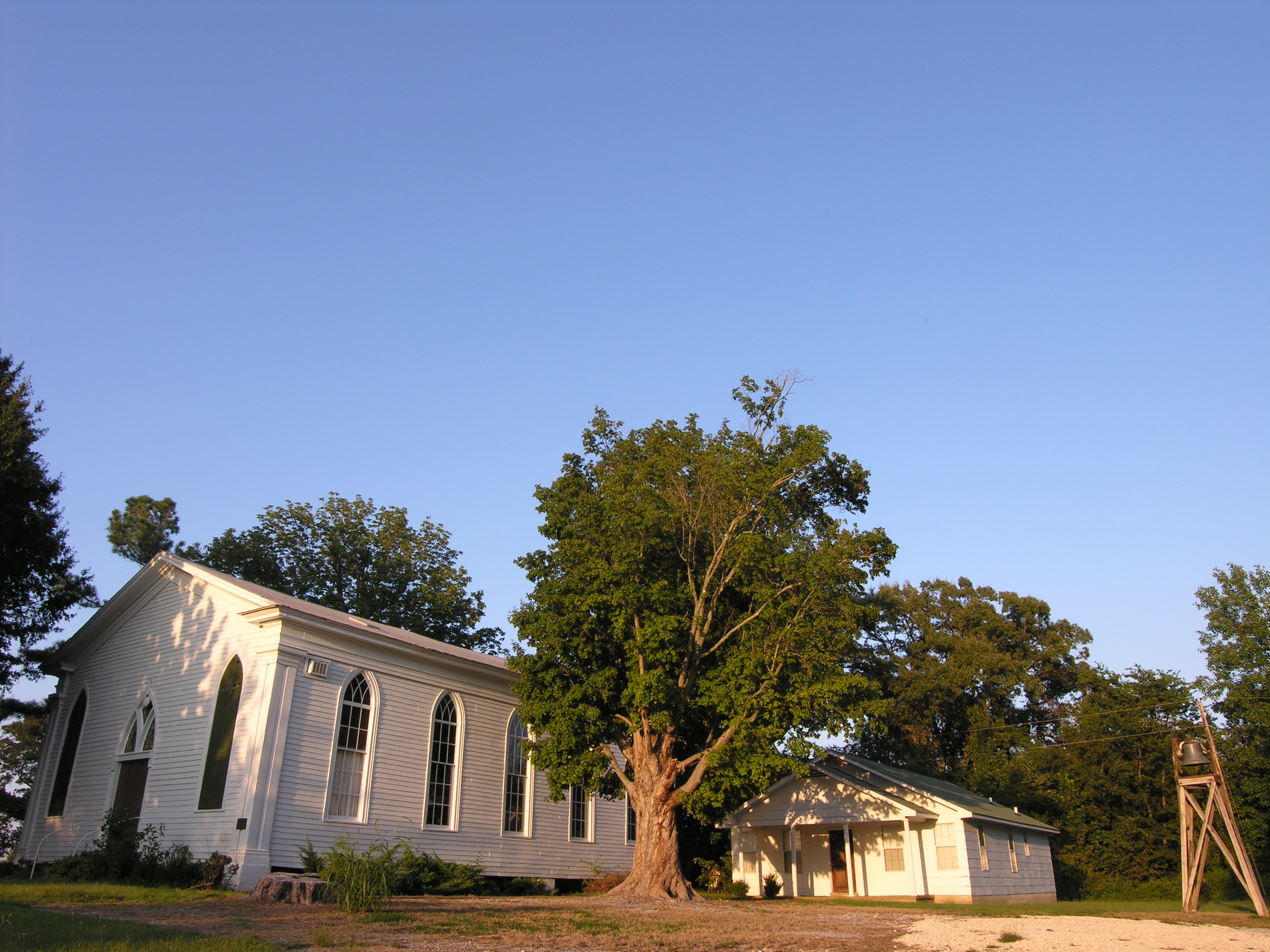

- Location within Tennessee Location within the United States
- Nearest city: Covington, Tennessee
- Coordinates: 35°29′49″N 89°38′53″W
- Area: 5 acres (2.0 ha)
- Built: 1854
- Architectural style: Greek Revival, Gothic Revival
- NRHP reference No.: 84003716
- Added to NRHP: July 12, 1984

Mount Carmel Presbyterian Church is a historic church in rural Tipton County, Tennessee, United States, near Covington.

The congregation was established in 1834 by settlers from Iredell County, North Carolina, and became the core of the small community of Mount Carmel. In 1839, a Presbyterian congregation that had been organized 10 years earlier in Covington was merged into the Mount Carmel church. The Mt. Carmel church continued to operate until 2000, when it merged its membership and assets with First Presbyterian Church of Covington.

The church building was completed in 1854. It was listed on the National Register of Historic Places in 1984. The church began regular usage again in August 2016 with the introduction of Sunday Morning Devotionals. Beginning in November 2019, Mt. Carmel became the location of the early morning worship service of First Presbyterian Church - Covington. The church is also used for special events such as weddings. A scene from the 2005 movie Walk the Line was shot there.
