= South College Street Historic District (Covington, Tennessee) =

Historic district in Tennessee, United States

- U.S. National Register of Historic Places
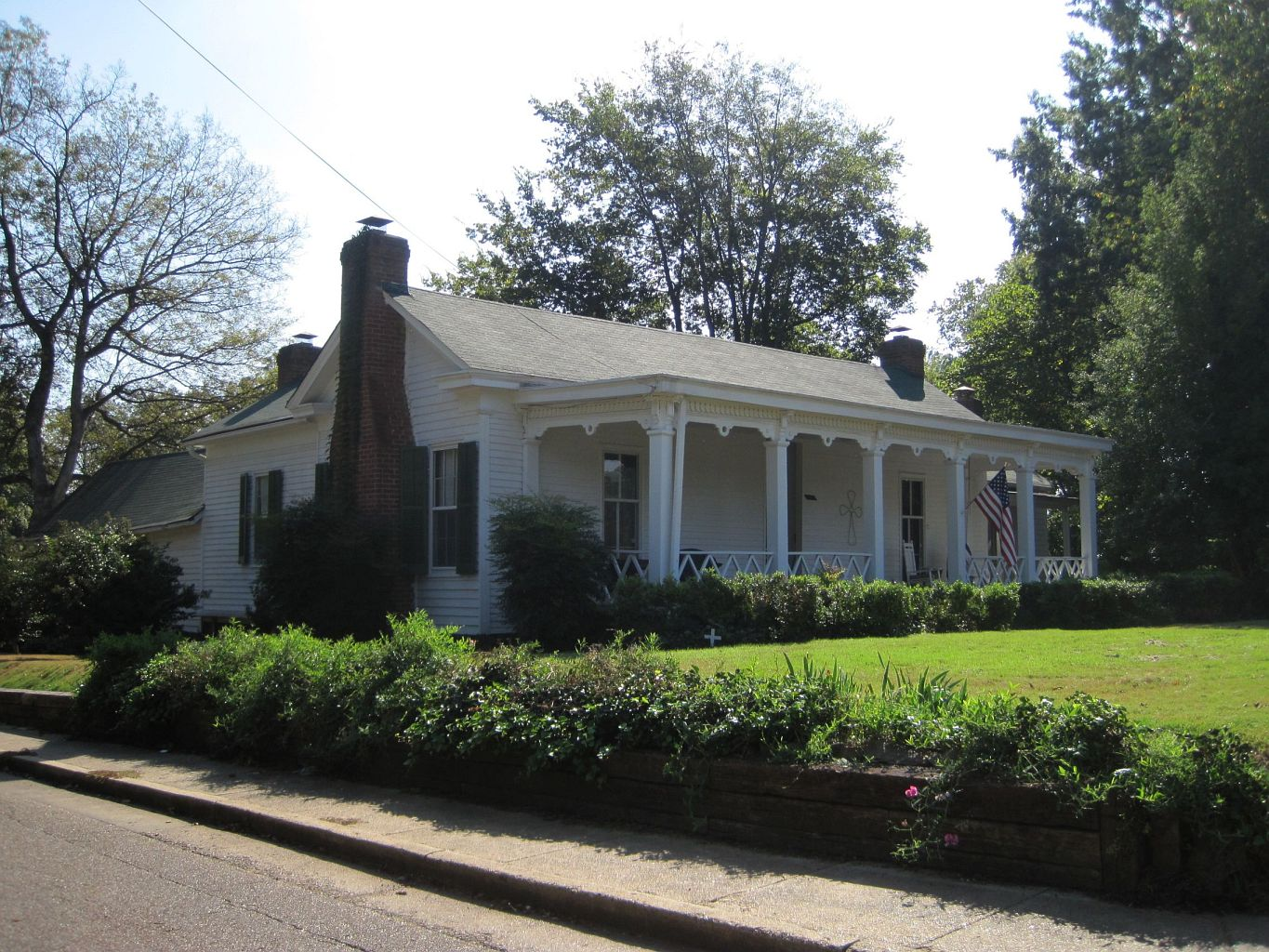
- The Simonton house in the historic district

- Location within Tennessee
- Location: 600, 700, and 800 Blocks of S. College St., Covington, Tennessee
- Coordinates: 35°33′45″N 89°38′55″W
- Area: 2 acres (0.81 ha)
- Architectural style: Queen Anne, Colonial Revival, Bungalow/craftsman
- NRHP reference No.: 97000037
- Added to NRHP: February 7, 1997

The South College Street Historic District in Covington, Tennessee is a historic district which is listed on the National Register of Historic Places in 1997. It included 17 contributing buildings (12 houses and five outbuildings) on 2 acres (0.81 ha).

It is a residential district, with houses built mostly between 1880 and 1932. It includes part or all of the 600, 700, and 800 blocks of S. College St. in the city of Covington, which is the county seat of Tipton County, Tennessee.

The oldest house was the home of Captain Charles B. Simonton, who fought for the Confederate States of America in the American Civil War. It was built c.1867-68 on what was then Sycamore Street, which was renamed South College Street around 1890.

It includes Queen Anne, Colonial Revival, Bungalow/craftsman and American Foursquare architectural styles.

It includes:

- Philip Austin Fisher House (c.1880), 604 South College Street, Classical Revival in style
- Hall-Roy Boyd House (c.1905), 605 South College Street, American Foursquare, with c.1905 garage
- R. K. Castellaw House (c.1927), 610 South College Street, Craftsman-influenced bungalow, with c.1928 garage
- Reid-Sanford-McGowan House (c.1925), 614 South College Street, Colonial Revival, T-shaped with a gable front-and-wing, with c.1925 garage.
