= Covington High School (Covington, Tennessee) =

Secondary school in Tennessee, United States

Location
- Covington, Tennessee; Tipton County; United States
- 35.55668°N 89.64967°W

Information
- Motto: Welcome to My City
- Established: 1970
- Principal: Carlin McGlown
- Teaching staff: 47.00 (FTE)
- Grades: 9–12
- Enrollment: 657 (2023–2024)
- Student to teacher ratio: 13.98
- Colors: Purple; Gold
- Team name: Chargers
- Website: chs.tipton-county.com

Covington High School (Covington, Tennessee) is a grade 9-12 institution in Tipton County, Tennessee.

== History ==
Covington High School was founded in 1970.

== Academics ==
CHS received a top grade of five or "most effective" on all four composite grades on the one, two and three-year trends on the TCAP/EOC/SAT 10. In 2011, the school recorded the highest rate of growth in Algebra proficiency in the state. In 2012 CHS won the state's SCORE award for the highest improvement trend in the state of Tennessee. It repeated the same feat in 2013 and 2014 making it the winner of the award for three consecutive years and in three of the award's four years of existence.

== Athletics ==
Covington High School won the Tennessee Secondary School Athletic Association state championship in baseball in 1999 and 2006.

== Clubs and organizations ==
Clubs and Organizations at Covington High School include Future Business Leaders of America, Future Farmers of America, HOSA, Band, and Choir.

== Demographics ==
Of a total enrollment of 831, 53% of the student body are minorities. 61% are economically disadvantaged.
