= Unaka High School =

Public high school in Tennessee, United States

Location
- 119 Robinson Lane; Elizabethton, Tennessee 37643; 36.38478°N 82.14511°W

Information
- Type: Public
- Established: 1922
- School district: Carter County Schools
- Principal: Aaron Dugger
- Faculty: 26.32 (on FTE basis)
- Grades: 9 to 12
- Enrollment: 315 (2022-2023)
- Student to teacher ratio: 11.97
- Colors: Maroon and White
- Athletics conference: TSSAA District 1 Division 1 East
- Mascot: Park Ranger
- Nickname: Rangers
- Team name: Rangers/Lady Rangers
- Website: Unaka High School

Unaka High School is a public high school located northeast of Elizabethton, Tennessee in the Hunter community.

== History ==
Work on the school began in 1920 and the construction was finished in 1922. Mr. Cole, a forest ranger, arranged for the government to donate the lumber for the construction of the school which was to come from the Unaka mountains. Resulting in the source of the name and mascot: Unaka for the mountains and Rangers in honor of Mr. Cole. In the 1970s the vocational programs were expanded in all Carter County high schools, with a new building at Unaka High housing Auto Body Repair, Cosmetology, General Building and Trades, and Vocational Office Education. Also, students had the option of attending alternative vocation classes at Hampton, or Happy Valley: Auto Mechanics, Drafting, Health Occupations, Small Engines, and Electricity and Welding. There is also a meat processing class that was introduced by Mr. John Hardin and student, Bobby Campbell in 1982. It's the only one of this type of class offered in the whole United States. It is taught by Mr. Cody Ayers.

== Sports ==
=== Football ===
Unaka football: The Home Field is known as Goddard Field named after the school's first head coach, Robert Lynn Goddard. In August 1949, he became head coach at Unaka High School. Immediately, he organized the Watauga Conference in the spring of 1949-50 and was elected as its first President. His 1949 team won the first game in the history of Unaka football. During the next 10 years, the Rangers football team under Goddard's leadership won six championships and finished second four times with only one losing season. Years later, the school named the stadium in front of Unaka High School the "Goddard Field" in his honor. The current head coach is O’Brien Bennet. Coach O’Brien Bennet led the Rangers to a state playoff game win in 2022. Goddard Field completed its remodeling to turf in 2026 losing their first game on the turf to Twin Springs High School on September 4th, 2026. The team remains a heavy pass team with very few run plays.

=== Basketball ===
Unaka basketball is rich in tradition. During the 1950s and 1960s Lynn Goddard coached boys basketball for seven years before leaving Unaka. Games are played in Ronnie L. Snavley Gymnasium after coach Ronnie Snavley who led the team to their first state tournament appearance in the 1980s then once more in the following years as a coach. Coach Snavley was succeeded by Coach Donald Ensor; Ensor had great success as the Rangers coach leading them to three state tournament appearances including a state championship in 2004 and sending numerous players to continue their careers in college basketball. Under coach Ensor the Rangers won 9 straight Conference Titles; after his resignation his younger brother took over for one year leading them to their 10th consecutive conference championship. The program is now run by coach Aaron Dugger, who played for Coach Ensor, until he graduated from Unaka in 2002. The Rangers have also compiled 12 district championships, 9 regional championships, and 6 sub-state appearances.

=== Baseball ===
Home games are played on Claude Hostlcaw "Field of Dreams." During Lynn Goddard's tenure at Unaka he coached the baseball team 4 years and won three Watauga championships. The Ranger baseball program has won or shared 15 straight conference titles, 12 district championships, 13 of the last 15 regional championships, and also won 7 of the last sub-state games to qualify them for 8 state tournament berths in 10 seasons. The Rangers have yet to lose a playoff game on their home field. Notable baseball alumni include Eddie Holly, who was drafted in the 5th round of the 1971 draft by the Chicago White Sox. As well as Josh Peterson who was drafted in the 40th round of the 2011 draft by the Texas Rangers and would later play professionally in Australia for the Perth Heat.

=== Softball ===
Established in 1979, the Unaka Lady Ranger softball has won 25 District Championships, 19 Regional Championships, and 5 Sub-States. Appearing in 5 State Tournament quarter finals and 8 State Tournament final eights, places the program as one of the elite in Tennessee. The program was built from the ground up by Coach Ronnie Hicks, and it remained under his care and supervision until his retirement in May 2011.

=== Band ===
Originally formed in the 1950s the band was under direction of Mr. Melvin Kelley. Unfortunately due to a fire at the original Unaka High School (now the location of Unaka Elementary), the band suffered heavy loss and the program was dismantled. In 1995, Mr. Raymond Morton rebuilt the program from scratch starting a High School Band and feeder programs at Unaka Elementary, and Hunter Elementary. The first uniforms were purchased in 1998 and were debuted in November 1998 at the Johnson City Christmas Parade. Under Mr. Morton, the program flourished producing many music educators including its current director. Now under the direction of Em Poff, the Unaka Band has won over 60 trophies. While with marching, the Band also takes part in many concerts. A spring and Christmas concert every year. Along with concerts and marching, they also go through parades and play in churches and nursing homes.
