= Canaan Baptist Church (Bessemer, Alabama) =

Historic church in Alabama, United States

- U.S. National Register of Historic Places
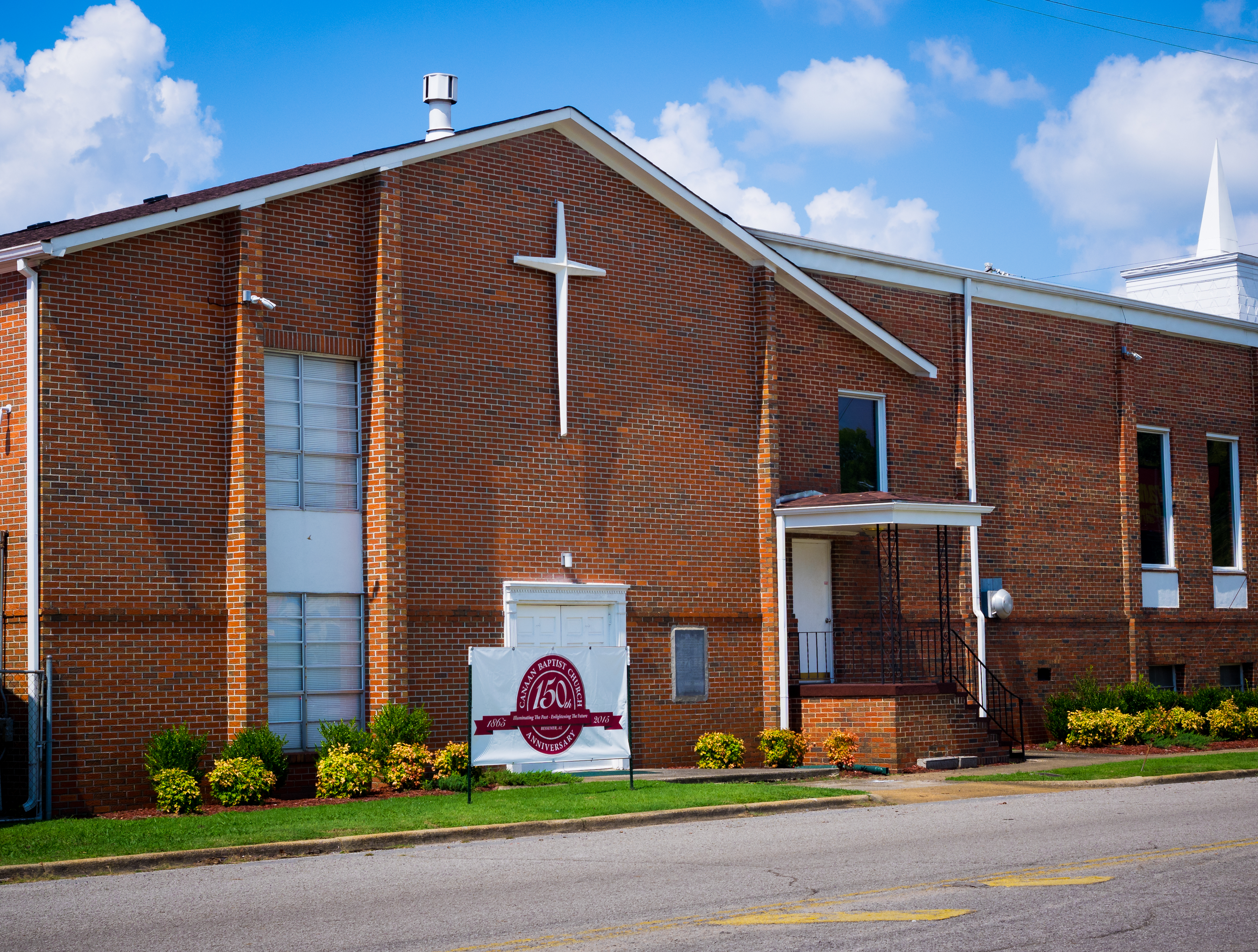
- July 2016: Canaan Baptist Church with 150th anniversary banner

- Location within Alabama Location within the United States
- Location: 824 Fifteenth Street North, Bessemer, Alabama
- Coordinates: 33°24′07″N 86°57′51″W
- Area: 1 acre (0.40 ha)
- Built: 1961
- MPS: Civil Rights Movement in Birmingham, Alabama MPS
- NRHP reference No.: 05000290
- Added to NRHP: April 22, 2005

Canaan Baptist Church is a Baptist church located in Bessemer, Alabama. It is affiliated with the National Baptist Convention, USA. Built in 1961, it had a congregation active in the Civil Rights Movement of the 20th century and was added to the National Register of Historic Places in 2005.

== History ==
Established in 1865 by W. M. Grimes, a white minister, Canaan Baptist is among the oldest African-American Baptist congregations in Bessemer. Many of its congregation had belonged to the white-dominated Canaan Baptist Church before the American Civil War but, with freedom, wanted to have an independent congregation. Southern African-American congregations soon set up state Baptist associations, aided by churches in the Midwest, and eventually the National Baptist Convention (which split in the 20th century). The "white" Canaan Baptist church also still operates in Bessemer as part of the Southern Baptist Convention.

Canaan Baptist Church in Bessemer was listed on the National Register of Historic Places in 2005 for its role as a locally significant property and key strategy center in the city during the Civil Rights Movement in the Birmingham area from the early to mid-1960s.

The African-American congregation of Canaan Baptist has occupied this lot in downtown Bessemer since 1889. The first church building on the current lot, at the corner of 9th Avenue and 15th Street, was opened in 1940 during the ministry of E. L. Plant. It was completed until 1947. The following year the J. H. Browder became the minister of Canaan Baptist Church. The present church building, constructed in 1961, is the second on the lot and was built under the direction of Browder, with George Wilson of Selma, Alabama, as the contractor.

== Role in the Civil Rights Movement ==
Under the leadership of Browder, who was pastor of Canaan Baptist from 1948 until his death in March 1964, the congregation was active in the civil rights movement. Browder significantly expanded the public outreach and service of the church. He improved church administration and greatly expanded educational programs, establishing a youth department and educational department, a Christian Aid Union, a Sunday School program, and a Matrons Department.

He also was active, along with other members of the congregation, in the Alabama Christian Movement for Human Rights in the late 1950s. Browder and Canaan Baptist gained a reputation locally for being a strong voice for equal rights, voting rights, and public desegregation at a time when African Americans were segregated by law and custom. They had been effectively disenfranchised under the state constitution since the late 19th century. Browder preached equality and fairness from the pulpit every Sunday. He strongly supported local efforts to desegregate schools after the United States Supreme Court's ruling in Brown v. Board of Education (1954) that segregation of public schools was unconstitutional as a denial of due process and equal rights.

Due to its public positions during the early civil rights period, the members of Canaan attracted considerable attention from white officials. In 1959, the City of Bessemer abruptly condemned the church's building, which had been first built in 1889 and expanded in 1908. The twin-tower church was an African-American landmark within Bessemer and the congregation had ensured that it received numerous updates and improvements during the Browder years to keep it safe and comfortable.

But, in 1958 two other black churches in the city had been destroyed by fires, which city officials claimed resulted from construction and wiring deficiencies. (Local African Americans believed that the fires were not accidental, as bombings of black churches and ministers' homes by KKK chapters was prevalent during these years in Birmingham and had already occurred in Bessemer. On April 28, 1957, the Allen Temple AME Church, at Ninth Avenue and 22nd Street, suffered a dynamite blast at the rear of the church during an evening service. There were no fatalities.)

The city government condemned the historic building of Canaan Baptist as unsafe. The congregation was forced to build a new one-story contemporary brick structure in 1960–61.

Browder made this an opportunity to expand the church's vital role in providing social and educational services for African Americans in Bessemer. For example, the segregated African-American public schools in Bessemer were not funded to support a kindergarten for black children. Browder organized a kindergarten for local children, which met in the basement of the 1961 church building. The new building, with its basement meeting rooms and the large sanctuary, became a strategy center for the congregation. It discussed and planned its role in such pivotal events in the greater Birmingham area as the Selective Buying Campaign of 1962, by which black residents boycotted stores that discriminated against them; the Southern Christian Leadership Conference in Birmingham in 1962, and the Project C ("Confrontation") demonstrations of 1963, intended to fill the jails with civil rights protesters in Birmingham and Bessemer.

After Browder's death in 1964, A. L. Bratcher became the minister. He led the church into a significant local role in implementing aspects of the civil rights movement in Bessemer. Bratcher helped the church become involved in the federal War on Poverty through using the Economic Opportunity Act of 1964. Through the creation of a Community Action Agency headquartered at the church, the congregation in 1964 established a Community Development Credit Union (CDCU), which still operates from the church in the 21st century. The Canaan Baptist CDCU was one of the first developed in the nation; it was eventually part of a national program of approximately 400 credit unions created between 1965 and 1973. It provided equal opportunity loans to local residents, who otherwise were discriminated against by local banks for the purchases of houses and the development of local businesses. The Community Action Agency also worked with congregation members and local residents on implementing the federal legislation of the Civil Rights Act and the Voting Rights Act.

Horace P. Turner became pastor at Canaan Baptist in December 1969 and continued as pastor to the end of the century. Under his leadership, the congregation built the educational annex in 1984, which provided new office space for the church's religious and social programs.

The Canaan Baptist Church is considered a locally significant strategy center for church buildings as part of Birmingham's Civil Rights Movement, 1933–1979.
