= Gary Odom =

American politician (born 1951)

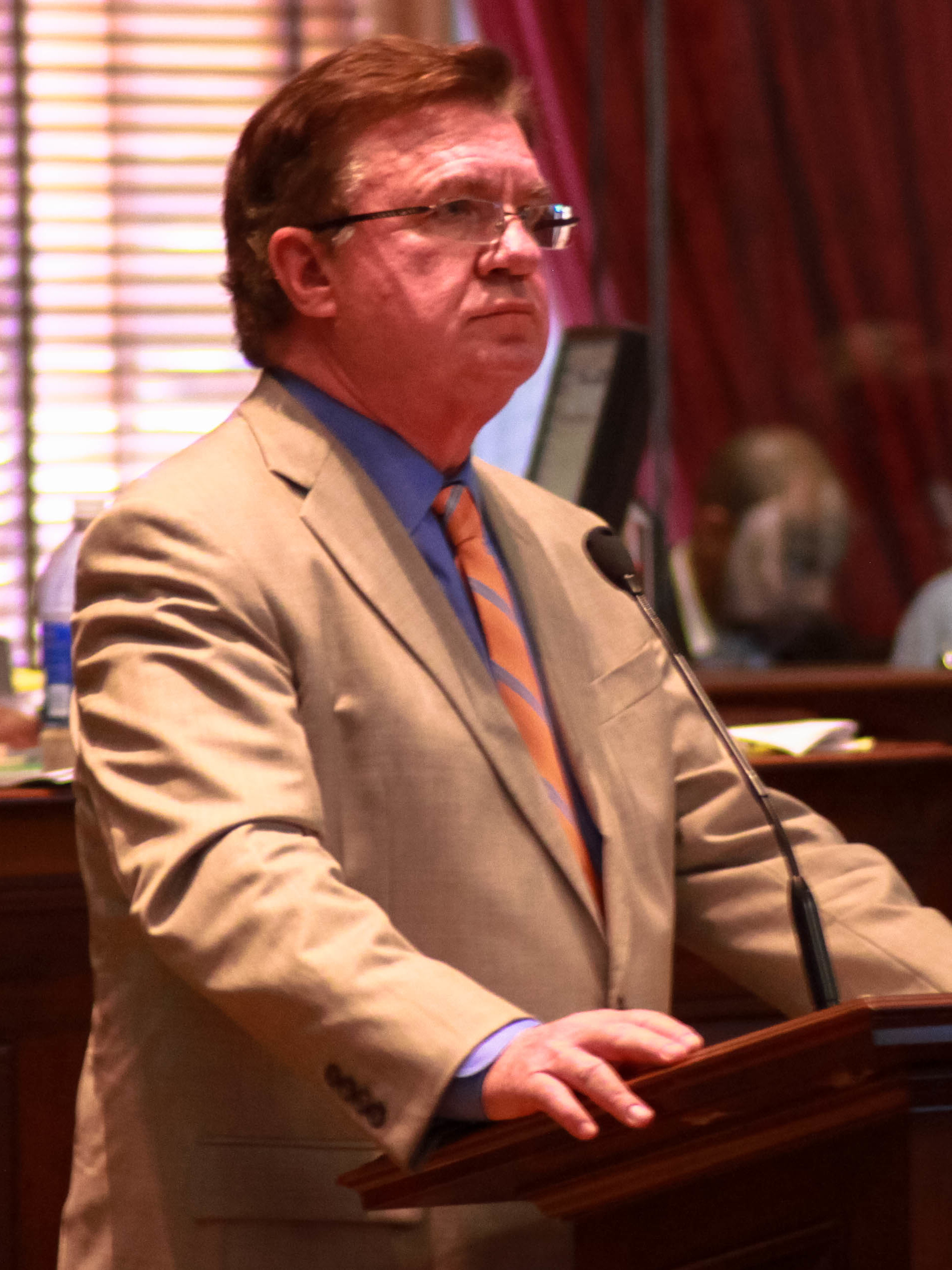
- Odom in 2014

Member of the Tennessee House of Representatives from the 55 district
- In office January 13, 1987 – January 13, 2015
- Preceded by: Michael D. Murphy
- Succeeded by: John Ray Clemmons

Personal details
- Born: November 1, 1951 (age 74) Elizabethton, Tennessee, U.S.
- Party: Democratic
- Education: Eastern Kentucky University

Gary Odom (born November 1, 1951) is an American politician from Nashville, Tennessee, and the former Democratic Minority Leader of the Tennessee House of Representatives. He was elected to represent the 55th district, which is part of Davidson County.

== Education and career ==
Odom was first elected as a state representative to serve in the 95th Tennessee General Assembly (1987–1988), succeeding fellow Democrat Michael Murphy. In addition to serving as the Democratic Majority Leader, Odom served as Chair of the House Ethics Committee and the House Rules Committee. He also served on the House Finance, Ways and Means Committee; the House Health and Human Resources Committee; the House Government Operations Committee; the House Calendar and Rules Committee; the House Budget Subcommittee; the House Professional Occupations Subcommittee; the Joint TACIR Committee; the Joint Worker's Compensation Committee; the Joint Lottery Oversight Committee; and the Joint Tenncare Oversight Committee.

Prior to his service in the Tennessee House of Representatives, he served in the Metropolitan Council of Nashville and Davidson County from 1983 to 1995. For three years, he was a faculty member at Aquinas Jr. College, and for 20 years he served as Executive Director of the Tennessee Optometric Association. In 1973, he graduated from East Tennessee State University with a Bachelor of Science degree, and in 1975 he earned his master's degree when he graduated from Eastern Kentucky University.

== Political views and sponsored legislation ==
In August 2007, Gary Odom sponsored a bill that made "doctor shopping," the practice of obtaining multiple prescriptions of the same or similar drugs from multiple doctors, a felony for patients on TennCare. He introduced a bill that would have required hunters to have permission of homeowners before firing weapons on private property and within 100 yards (91 m) of someone's home, and after that was rejected by a House subcommittee, he introduced a bill to authorize local governments to regulate hunting. In February 1998, he sponsored a bill that allowed Tennessee's 51 parks to put up voluntary donation boxes. He voted against a bill that would have amended the Tennessee State Constitution to state that abortion is not included as a right to privacy in Tennessee.

He was opposed to one aspect of Nashville, Tennessee's tree ordinance, which required 14 tree units, or about 28 small trees, to be planted per paved acre. Another option for large trucking companies was to make a payment to the city's tree fund, and a friend of Gary Odom owed the city's tree fund $191,000 as a result. He stated the ordinance is impractical for large industrial sites such as the 45-acre (180,000 m^{2}) lot Western Express owns.

Tennessee House of Representatives
Preceded by Michael D. Murphy	Tennessee State Representative, 55th District; 1987–2015	Succeeded by John Ray Clemmons
