= Brighton High School (Brighton, Tennessee) =

Location
- 8045 Highway 51 S Brighton, Tennessee 38011; United States

Information
- School type: Public
- Status: Operational
- School district: Tipton County Schools
- Principal: Brian Crowson
- Teaching staff: 65.83 (FTE)
- Grades: 9–12
- Enrollment: 1,031 (2024–2025)
- Student to teacher ratio: 16.95
- Colours: Red and white
- Athletics: TSSAA Division I, Athletic District 8
- Nickname: Cardinals
- Website: bhs.tipton-county.com

Brighton High School is a high school in Brighton, Tennessee. It is one of three high schools in Tipton County; the others are Covington High School and Munford High School.

== History ==
Brighton High School has documented operations from the 1995–1996 school year, with its first principal, Grant Shipley, serving from 1996. The school's first graduating class completed their studies in 1999. In 2006, the school received the National School Change Award from Fordham University. Brighton High School was subsequently recognized four times by U.S. News & World Report as a Bronze Medal school in its annual high school rankings, in 2008, 2009, 2010, and 2013.

== Campus ==
Brighton's campus consists of the main school building, parking lot, football field, practice field, a weight room, and a track. Additions to the school in the 2007–2008 school year gave the campus a new tennis court and another wing to the building, that includes around 7 new classrooms, a band/ choir room, and a more improved shop for the school's Agricultural Program. The main building consists of 6 main hallways, a cafeteria, an atrium, a library, a greenhouse, and a shop. The field-house is where the weights are located for use by the school's athletic teams.

== Curriculum ==
Additional courses are available to Brighton students through TCAT Northwest (formerly the Tennessee Technology Center at Covington) and Dyersburg State Community College. However, the school only has half the state average AP course participation at 5%. This may stem from the fact that the school uses an unweighted GPA, discouraging students from taking more challenging honors, AP, and dual enrollment classes.
