= Canaan Baptist Church (Covington, Tennessee) =

Historic church in Tennessee, United States

- U.S. National Register of Historic Places
- Location within Tennessee Location within the United States
- Location: 211 N. Main St., Covington, Tennessee
- Coordinates: 35°33′34″N 89°38′20″W
- Area: 1 acre (0.40 ha)
- Built: 1916
- Architectural style: Gothic Revival
- MPS: Rural African-American Churches in Tennessee MPS
- NRHP reference No.: 99001457
- Added to NRHP: November 30, 1999

The Canaan Baptist Church is a historic African-American church in Covington, Tennessee. The congregation was established in 1868. The church building was built in 1916 and was listed on the U.S. National Register of Historic Places in 1999. It is the oldest African-American church in Covington.
