= Garland, Tennessee =

- Town
- Location of Garland in Tipton County, Tennessee.
- Coordinates: 35°34′38″N 89°45′21″W
- Country: United States
- State: Tennessee
- County: Tipton

Area
  - Total: 0.54 sq mi (1.41 km^{2})
  - Land: 0.54 sq mi (1.41 km^{2})
  - Water: 0 sq mi (0.00 km^{2})
- Elevation: 354 ft (108 m)

Population (2020)
  - Total: 289
  - Density: 531.5/sq mi (205.21/km^{2})
- Time zone: UTC-6 (Central (CST))
  - Summer (DST): UTC-5 (CDT)
- FIPS code: 47-28680
- GNIS feature ID: 1285165

Garland is a town in Tipton County, Tennessee. As of the 2020 census, Garland had a population of 289.

== Geography ==
Garland is located at 35°34′38″N 89°45′21″W (35.577189, -89.755768).

According to the United States Census Bureau, the town has a total area of 0.6 square miles (1.6 km^{2}), all land.

== Demographics ==
Historical population
Census	Pop.	Note	%±
1920	119		—
1930	146		22.7%
1940	160		9.6%
1950	157		−1.9%
1960	168		7.0%
1970	292		73.8%
1980	301		3.1%
1990	194		−35.5%
2000	309		59.3%
2010	310		0.3%
2020	289		−6.8%

As of the census of 2000, there were 309 people, 120 households, and 95 families residing in the town. The population density was 551.2 inhabitants per square mile (212.8/km^{2}). There were 127 housing units at an average density of 226.6 per square mile (87.5/km^{2}). The racial makeup of the town was 98.06% White, 0.32% African American, 1.29% Native American, and 0.32% from two or more races.

There were 120 households, out of which 32.5% had children under the age of 18 living with them, 60.8% were married couples living together, 15.8% had a female householder with no husband present, and 20.8% were non-families. 20.0% of all households were made up of individuals, and 10.0% had someone living alone who was 65 years of age or older. The average household size was 2.58 and the average family size was 2.94.

In the town, the population was spread out, with 24.9% under the age of 18, 8.7% from 18 to 24, 29.1% from 25 to 44, 21.0% from 45 to 64, and 16.2% who were 65 years of age or older. The median age was 37 years. For every 100 females, there were 100.6 males. For every 100 females age 18 and over, there were 91.7 males.

The median income for a household in the town was $47,083, and the median income for a family was $49,063. Males had a median income of $32,917 versus $23,173 for females. The per capita income for the town was $17,069. About 5.4% of families and 9.4% of the population were below the poverty line, including 6.7% of those under eighteen and 17.9% of those 65 or over.

== History ==
The village of Garland was named in honor of Dr. John Crawley Garland (1832-1884), a physician who practiced in there.

== Emergency Services ==
=== Law Enforcement ===
Law enforcement in Garland is the responsibility of the Tipton County Sheriff's Office, Tennessee Highway Patrol, and Tipton County Constable's Office.

=== Fire and EMS ===
Since 1985, the town has operated the Garland Volunteer Fire Department, which, operates 5 apparatus out of Station 21 located on the corner of Garland-Detroit Road and Garland Drive. The sitting Fire Chief is Chief Wayne Wolfe. It responds to both fire and medical calls.
