= Brighton, Tennessee =

- Town
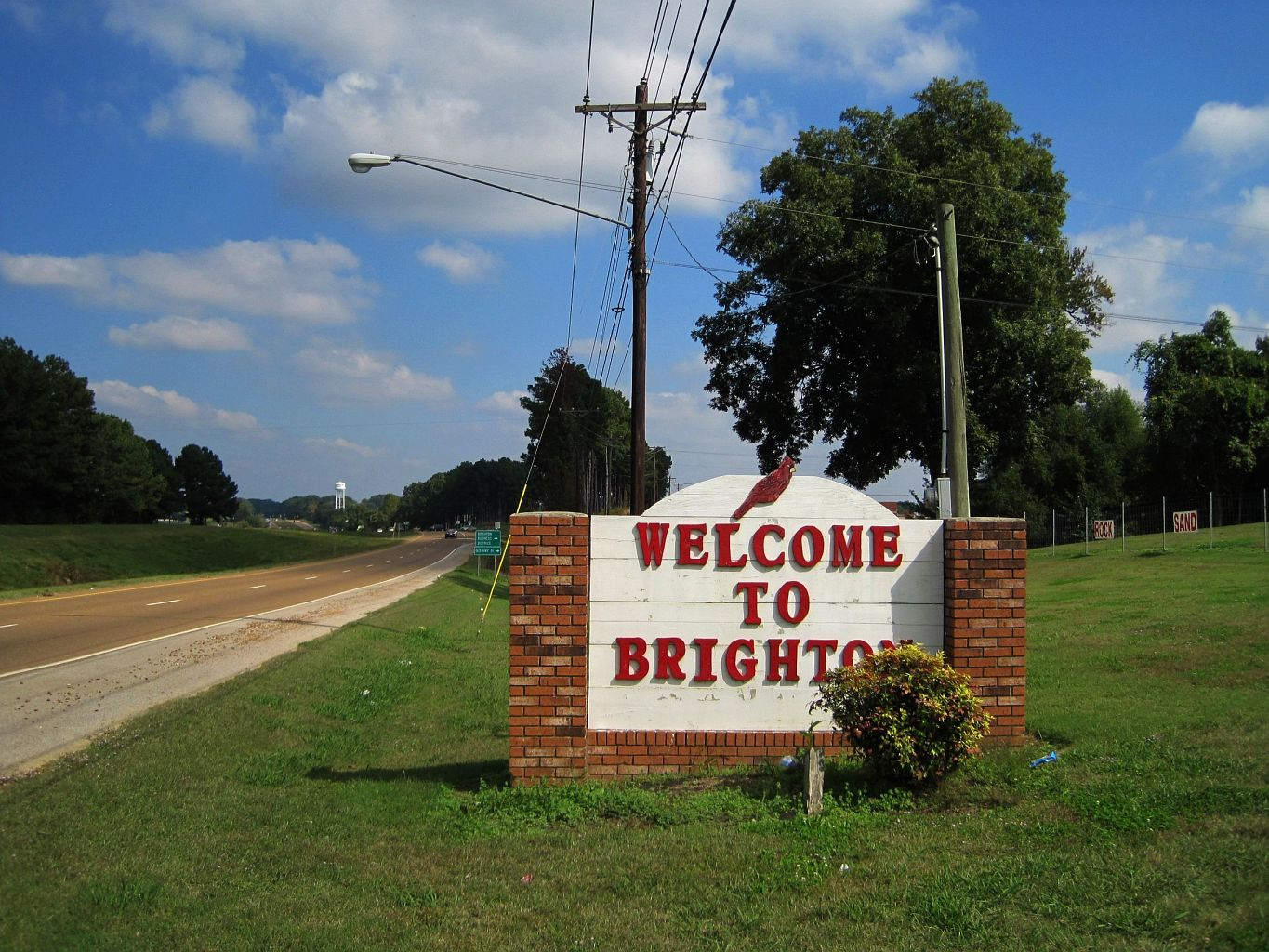

- Location of Brighton in Tipton County, Tennessee.
- Coordinates: 35°28′58″N 89°43′25″W
- Country: United States
- State: Tennessee
- County: Tipton

Government
  - Mayor: Josh Hazlerig

Area
  - Total: 3.03 sq mi (7.86 km^{2})
  - Land: 3.03 sq mi (7.86 km^{2})
  - Water: 0 sq mi (0.00 km^{2})
- Elevation: 341 ft (104 m)

Population (2020)
  - Total: 2,888
  - Density: 951.2/sq mi (367.26/km^{2})
- Time zone: UTC-6 (Central (CST))
  - Summer (DST): UTC-5 (CDT)
- ZIP code: 38011
- Area code: 901
- FIPS code: 47-08500
- GNIS feature ID: 1278391
- Website: www.townofbrighton.com

Brighton is a town in Tipton County, Tennessee, United States. As of the 2020 census, Brighton had a population of 2,888.

== History ==
Brighton was established in the year 1873, along the newly completed tracts of the Memphis and Paducah Railroad upon the lands of A. W. Smith, Sr. who gave the initial five acres for the Depot grounds. The new town was named for Mr. Bright, the first conductor on the Memphis Division of the said road.

The new town grew quickly. By the late 1870s, Brighton had two dry goods stores, three grocery stores, two saloons, two blacksmith shops, two wagon shops, one brick yard, one steam saw and grist mill, one steam cotton gin, a Baptist church, two physicians, and a population of approximately 100.

In 1883, the veterans of the 7th Tennessee Cavalry, Confederate States of America made Brighton the permanent site of their annual reunion. At Brighton, the veterans reunion took on new dimensions and it grew into a reunion of all Confederate veterans of Tipton County and the surrounding region. Over the years, attendance of this annual August event grew, peaking at 15,000 in 1897. The Tipton County Confederate Veterans Reunion, as it came to be known, continued to be held at Brighton until 1940.

Brighton was incorporated by the Tennessee General Assembly in 1913 and the town today continues to operate under the same charter.

== Notable person ==
- Dalton Rushing - Brighton, Tennessee

Los Angeles Dodgers Catcher

== Geography ==
Brighton is located at 35°28′58″N 89°43′25″W (35.482847, -89.723563).

According to the United States Census Bureau, the town has a total area of 2.7 square miles (7.0 km^{2}), all land.

== Demographics ==
Historical population
Census	Pop.	Note	%±
1880	104		—
1890	214		105.8%
1920	265		—
1930	297		12.1%
1940	299		0.7%
1950	306		2.3%
1960	652		113.1%
1970	952		46.0%
1980	976		2.5%
1990	717		−26.5%
2000	1,719		139.7%
2010	2,735		59.1%
2020	2,888		5.6%

=== 2020 census ===
Brighton racial composition
Race	Num.	Perc.
White (non-Hispanic)	2,110	73.06%
Black or African American (non-Hispanic)	469	16.24%
Native American	4	0.14%
Asian	17	0.59%
Pacific Islander	2	0.07%
Other/Mixed	183	6.34%
Hispanic or Latino	103	3.57%

As of the 2020 United States census, there were 2,888 people, 987 households, and 723 families residing in the town.

=== 2000 census ===
As of the census of 2000, there were 1,719 people, 596 households, and 470 families residing in the town. The population density was 627.8 inhabitants per square mile (242.4/km^{2}). There were 628 housing units at an average density of 229.3 per square mile (88.5/km^{2}). The racial makeup of the town was 77.20% White, 20.65% African American, 0.23% Native American, 0.47% Asian, 0.06% Pacific Islander, 0.23% from other races, and 1.16% from two or more races. Hispanic or Latino of any race were 1.34% of the population.

There were 596 households, out of which 49.5% had children under the age of 18 living with them, 56.7% were married couples living together, 17.3% had a female householder with no husband present, and 21.1% were non-families. 18.3% of all households were made up of individuals, and 8.6% had someone living alone who was 65 years of age or older. The average household size was 2.88 and the average family size was 3.27.

In the town, the population was spread out, with 36.2% under the age of 18, 8.0% from 18 to 24, 34.0% from 25 to 44, 13.3% from 45 to 64, and 8.6% who were 65 years of age or older. The median age was 29 years. For every 100 females, there were 86.8 males. For every 100 females age 18 and over, there were 82.8 males.

The median income for a household in the town was $43,510, and the median income for a family was $46,538. Males had a median income of $36,012 versus $25,789 for females. The per capita income for the town was $15,432. About 7.8% of families and 8.3% of the population were below the poverty line, including 10.6% of those under age 18 and 7.9% of those age 65 or over.

== Education ==
Brighton Public Schools are part of Tipton County Schools. The Tipton County School District has eight elementary schools, five middle schools and three high schools.

Dr. John Combs is the Director of Schools.

Schools located in Brighton include:

- Brighton Elementary School
- Brighton Middle School
- Brighton High School
