= Covington, Tennessee =

- City
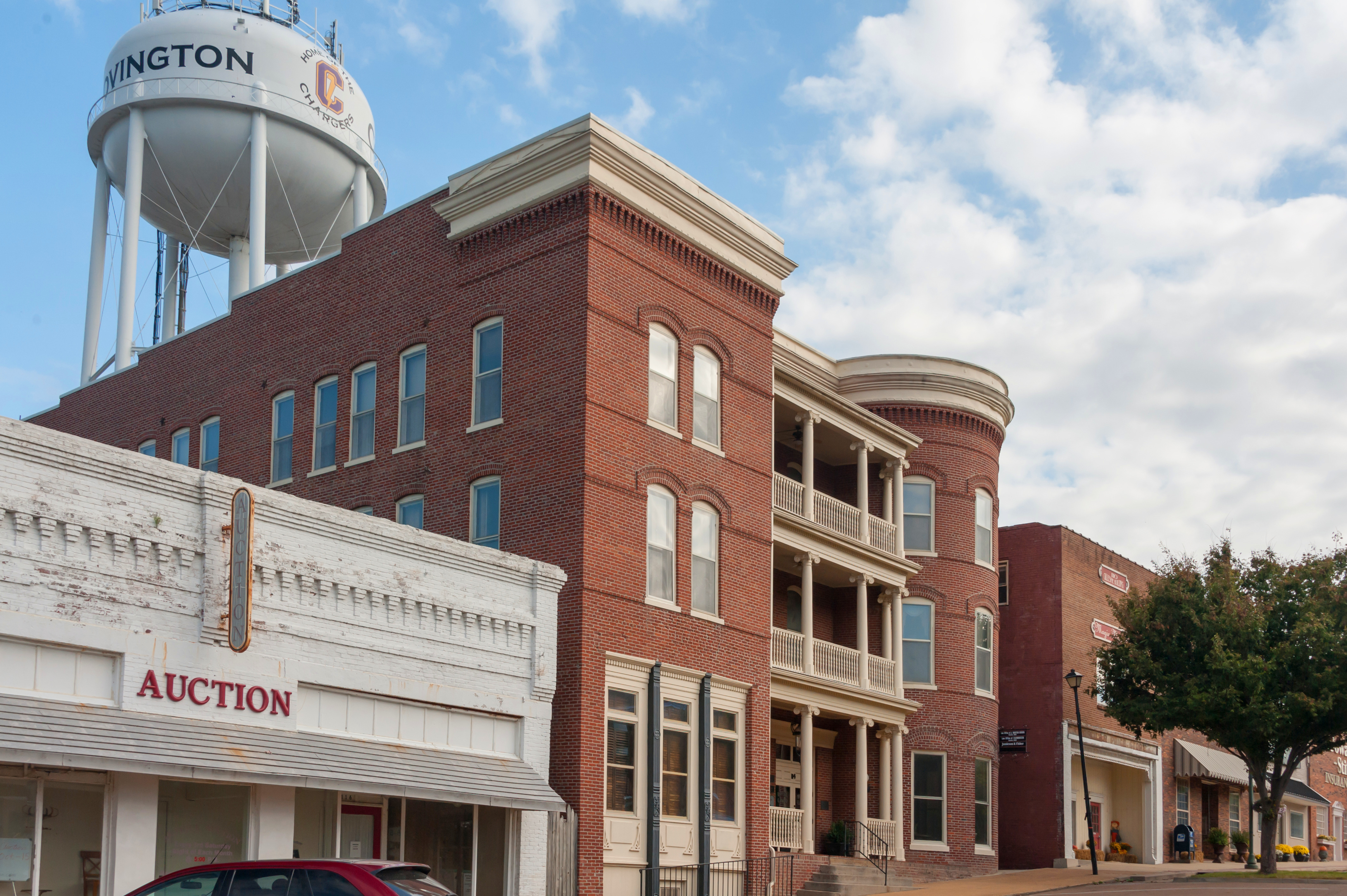
- The Hotel Lindo is one of ten sites in Covington listed on the National Register of Historic Places
- Nickname: The Heart of Tipton County
- Location of Covington in Tipton County, Tennessee.
- Coordinates: 35°33′51″N 89°38′47″W
- Country: United States
- State: Tennessee
- County: Tipton
- Named for: Leonard Covington

Area
  - Total: 11.38 sq mi (29.47 km^{2})
  - Land: 11.37 sq mi (29.45 km^{2})
  - Water: 0.0077 sq mi (0.02 km^{2})
- Elevation: 335 ft (102 m)

Population (2020)
  - Total: 8,663
  - Density: 761.8/sq mi (294.15/km^{2})
- Time zone: UTC-6 (Central (CST))
  - Summer (DST): UTC-5 (CDT)
- ZIP code: 38019
- Area code: 901
- FIPS code: 47-17680
- GNIS feature ID: 1281435
- Website: www.covingtontn.gov

Covington is a city in central Tipton County, Tennessee, United States. Covington is the second largest city in and the county seat of Tipton County. The city is located in West Tennessee, 12 mi (19 km) east of the Mississippi River. As of the 2020 census, Covington had a population of 8,663. Located 42 mi (68 km) northeast of Memphis, Covington is part of the Memphis, Tennessee Metropolitan Area.

== History ==
The Covington area was originally inhabited by Native Americans of various tribes. They used the nearby Mississippi River as a trading route among numerous American Indian nations, who for more than 1,000 years conducted continent-deep trading between the upper river and the Southeast. Evidence of such trading has been found in materials and items excavated from numerous archeological sites.

Tipton County is one of five present-day counties of the State of Tennessee that border the Mississippi River. The first Europeans to explore this area were attached to the noted expedition of the French Canadians Jacques Marquette and Louis Joliet in 1673. This expedition went down the Mississippi from present-day Wisconsin to the mouth of the Arkansas River, and then back upriver to Lake Michigan. The Arkansas River represents part of the border between present-day Arkansas and Mississippi. It is likely that de Soto and his men passed near here circa 1541.

During the 19th century, because this entire area consists of fertile floodplains and a climate of long, hot summers, and adequate rainfall, the Covington area and the rest of West Tennessee were developed for cotton plantations. This became the primary commodity crop across the South in the 19th century, generating great wealth for many large planters. African-American slaves were brought to Western Tennessee by planters relocating here, or forced here by sale in the domestic slave trade. West Tennessee was the center of large-scale slavery in Tennessee, and Memphis had a major slave market. Planters and farmers in Middle Tennessee also held slaves, although in fewer number. Farmers in the eastern part of the state mostly developed small subsistence farms and held few slaves.

During the Civil War, Union Army and Union Navy fought to gain control of strategic areas along the Mississippi River in order to control its traffic and split the Confederate States in two. The Confederate Army resisted, but the Union Army defeated and occupied forces in Tipton and other counties of Tennessee and northeastern Arkansas. The war ended early in the Covington area, and Tennessee was occupied by Union forces from 1862.

Starting in the 1870s during the Reconstruction era, the state legislature supported railroad construction in the region, to improve transporting crops to market. The Memphis and Paducah Railroad completed its tracks to Covington in July 1873. The first telegraph line between Memphis and Covington was completed in 1882. In 1894, electric power was installed in Covington. The city established a municipal water system in 1898 to provide residents with pure drinking water.

Twentieth-century improvements included street paving in 1922. Since 1929, a natural gas company has operated to provide cooking gas and wintertime heating to homes and business in Covington. The time that telephone service was installed in Covington is not known.

Following the invention of the automobile, during the 1910s and 1920s the United States began to construct more intercity paved highways in various regions of the county. These developed into the U.S. Numbered Highway System, and U.S. Route 51 was established. This highway connects Memphis and points south with Chicago, via Covington and Cairo, Illinois. Covington is a small town with access to a major north–south highway of commerce and travel.

Both black and white tenant farmers and sharecroppers in West Tennessee struggled with poverty as a result of lower cotton prices during the Great Depression, which added to social tensions between ethnic groups. Whites maintained their political supremacy, having disenfranchised most blacks at the turn of the 20th century. After an armed altercation during a July 1937 police raid on an illegal gambling site, Albert Gooden was arrested as a suspect in the death of a sheriff's deputy. Because of lynching threats, the sheriff took the African-American man to be held in custody in Memphis. A month later, when the sheriff was secretly transporting Gooden back to Covington to stand trial, his car was stopped on an isolated road. Masked men took Gooden away. His body was found the next day, half in the river and shot more than 30 times. The governor offered a $5000 reward, but no one was prosecuted for the lynching. Gooden was the first man to be lynched in Tipton County since the late 19th century; his was one of several lynchings in the nation that year. It was covered by The New York Times and other major newspapers.

The South Main Street Historic District in Covington includes about 50 houses from the late 19th and the early 20th centuries, along with commercial structures of historic interest.

== Geography ==
Covington is part of the Memphis, Tennessee Metropolitan Area, and is located 42 mi (68 km) northeast of that large city. U.S. Route 51, a major north–south highway running between Mississippi and Illinois, passes through the city.

According to the United States Census Bureau, this town has a total area of 10.3 square miles (27 km^{2}), of which practically all of it is land.

Covington is situated on the southeastern edge of the New Madrid Seismic Zone, an area judged by geologists to have a high risk of earthquakes in the future.

=== Climate ===
The climate in this area is characterized by hot, humid summers and generally mild to cool winters. According to the Köppen Climate Classification system, Covington has a humid subtropical climate, abbreviated "Cfa" on climate maps.

Climate data for Covington, Tennessee (1991–2020 normals, extremes 1890–2018)
Month	Jan	Feb	Mar	Apr	May	Jun	Jul	Aug	Sep	Oct	Nov	Dec	Year
Record high °F (°C)	78 (26)	81 (27)	92 (33)	92 (33)	98 (37)	105 (41)	108 (42)	108 (42)	104 (40)	97 (36)	87 (31)	79 (26)	108 (42)
Mean daily maximum °F (°C)	46.3 (7.9)	50.8 (10.4)	60.1 (15.6)	70.2 (21.2)	78.7 (25.9)	86.2 (30.1)	89.0 (31.7)	88.2 (31.2)	82.7 (28.2)	72.3 (22.4)	59.5 (15.3)	49.6 (9.8)	69.5 (20.8)
Daily mean °F (°C)	37.4 (3.0)	41.1 (5.1)	49.8 (9.9)	59.2 (15.1)	68.3 (20.2)	76.1 (24.5)	79.1 (26.2)	77.7 (25.4)	71.4 (21.9)	60.4 (15.8)	49.0 (9.4)	40.6 (4.8)	59.2 (15.1)
Mean daily minimum °F (°C)	28.5 (−1.9)	31.5 (−0.3)	39.5 (4.2)	48.2 (9.0)	57.9 (14.4)	66.0 (18.9)	69.1 (20.6)	67.2 (19.6)	60.1 (15.6)	48.6 (9.2)	38.6 (3.7)	31.6 (−0.2)	48.9 (9.4)
Record low °F (°C)	−15 (−26)	−11 (−24)	7 (−14)	24 (−4)	32 (0)	45 (7)	49 (9)	46 (8)	33 (1)	22 (−6)	6 (−14)	−9 (−23)	−15 (−26)
Average precipitation inches (mm)	4.36 (111)	4.64 (118)	5.26 (134)	5.34 (136)	5.84 (148)	4.27 (108)	4.37 (111)	3.58 (91)	3.58 (91)	3.79 (96)	4.92 (125)	5.82 (148)	55.77 (1,417)
Average snowfall inches (cm)	0.7 (1.8)	0.6 (1.5)	0.9 (2.3)	0.0 (0.0)	0.0 (0.0)	0.0 (0.0)	0.0 (0.0)	0.0 (0.0)	0.0 (0.0)	0.0 (0.0)	0.0 (0.0)	0.2 (0.51)	2.4 (6.1)
Average precipitation days (≥ 0.01 in)	8.9	8.0	9.2	8.9	9.5	8.7	7.8	6.0	6.4	6.9	8.7	9.6	98.6
Average snowy days (≥ 0.1 in)	0.7	0.5	0.2	0.0	0.0	0.0	0.0	0.0	0.0	0.0	0.0	0.0	1.4
Source: NOAA

== Demographics ==
Historical population
Census	Pop.	Note	%±
1850	368		—
1870	447		—
1880	799		78.7%
1890	1,067		33.5%
1900	2,787		161.2%
1910	2,990		7.3%
1920	3,410		14.0%
1930	3,397		−0.4%
1940	3,513		3.4%
1950	4,379		24.7%
1960	5,298		21.0%
1970	5,801		9.5%
1980	6,065		4.6%
1990	7,487		23.4%
2000	8,463		13.0%
2010	9,038		6.8%
2020	8,663		−4.1%
2025 (est.)	8,585	▼	−0.9%

=== 2020 census ===
As of the 2020 census, Covington had a population of 8,663, 3,510 households, and 2,179 families. The median age was 37.3 years; 26.7% of residents were under the age of 18 and 18.4% of residents were 65 years of age or older. For every 100 females there were 80.8 males, and for every 100 females age 18 and over there were 73.5 males age 18 and over.

81.5% of residents lived in urban areas, while 18.5% lived in rural areas.

There were 3,510 households in Covington, of which 34.2% had children under the age of 18 living in them. Of all households, 27.3% were married-couple households, 17.5% were households with a male householder and no spouse or partner present, and 48.6% were households with a female householder and no spouse or partner present. About 33.8% of all households were made up of individuals and 15.7% had someone living alone who was 65 years of age or older.

There were 3,834 housing units, of which 8.5% were vacant. The homeowner vacancy rate was 2.3% and the rental vacancy rate was 6.4%.

Racial composition as of the 2020 census
Race	Number	Percent
White	3,914	45.2%
Black or African American	4,271	49.3%
American Indian and Alaska Native	22	0.3%
Asian	47	0.5%
Native Hawaiian and Other Pacific Islander	3	0.0%
Some other race	60	0.7%
Two or more races	346	4.0%
Hispanic or Latino (of any race)	151	1.7%

=== 2000 census ===
As of the census of 2000, there was a population of 8,463, with 3,199 households and 2,136 families residing in the city. The population density was 822.1 inhabitants per square mile (317.4/km^{2}). There were 3,372 housing units at an average density of 327.6 per square mile (126.5/km^{2}). The racial makeup of the city was 51.59% White, 46.54% African American, 0.48% Native American, 0.44% Asian, 0.05% Pacific Islander, 0.25% from other races, and 0.65% from two or more races. Hispanic or Latino of any race were 0.79% of the population.

There were 3,199 households, out of which 34.1% had children under the age of 18 living with them, 37.9% were married couples living together, 25.4% had a female householder with no husband present, and 33.2% were non-families. 29.9% of all households were made up of individuals, and 13.4% had someone living alone who was 65 years of age or older. The average household size was 2.54 and the average family size was 3.17.

In the city, the population was spread out, with 29.7% under the age of 18, 10.3% from 18 to 24, 25.3% from 25 to 44, 19.3% from 45 to 64, and 15.5% who were 65 years of age or older. The median age was 33 years. For every 100 females, there were 79.0 males. For every 100 females age 18 and over, there were 70.8 males.

The median income for a household in the city was $24,684, and the median income for a family was $32,213. Males had a median income of $28,964 versus $20,938 for females. The per capita income for the city was $14,293. About 25.2% of families and 27.9% of the population were below the poverty line, including 37.9% of those under age 18 and 34.1% of those age 65 or over.

== Arts and culture ==
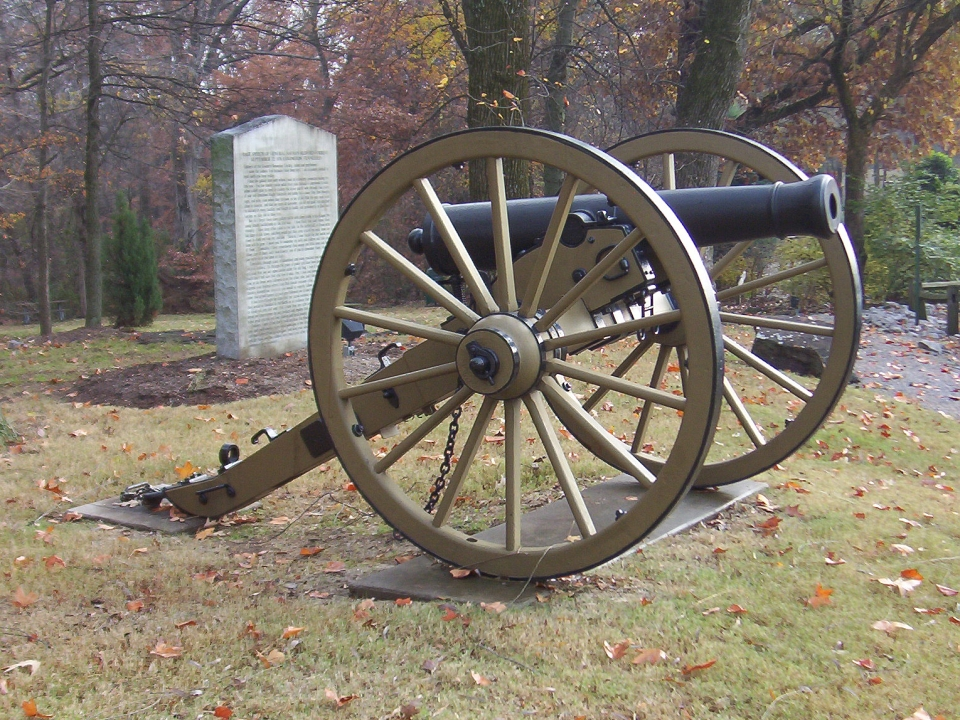
Cannon in front of the Nature Center & Veteran's Memorial in Covington. Marker in the background shows Nathan Bedford Forrest's last speech. (2007)

=== Tipton County Museum ===
The Tipton County Museum is located in Covington. This museum displays and interprets artifacts from Tipton County's rich heritage. It also has a nature center depicting the unique ecosystem of West Tennessee. Mountings of local animal species are kept there, and fragments of mastodon bone represent species alive during its ancient natural history. Adjacent to the museum, there is a 20-acre park, with a 0.5 miles (805 m) walking trail. Natural woodland and a man-made wetland provide habitat to some of the smaller local species such as turtles and birds.

The Veterans Memorial in front of the museum commemorates the soldiers from the county who lost their lives in wars. This museum is closed on Sundays and Mondays, and admission to the museum and to the park is free.

== Education ==
Covington Public Schools are part of Tipton County Schools. The Tipton County School District has six elementary schools, one K-8 magnet school, three middle schools and three high schools.

Schools located in Covington include:

- Austin Peay Elementary School
- Crestview Elementary School
- Covington Integrated Arts Academy
- Crestview Middle School
- Covington High School
- Tipton County Alternative Learning Center

Dr. John Combs is the Director of Schools.

== Notable people ==
- William F. Bringle, US navy Admiral, Recipient of the Navy Cross
- Augustus Hill Garland, 11th governor of Arkansas and Attorney General of the United States Lawyer, & Democrat
- Isaac Hayes was born here; the composer and musician has been inducted in the Hall-of-Fame, Played the voice of Chef in South Park
- Harvey Hendrick, former Baseball player and member of the New York Yankees first World Series championship team 1923, Died in Covington
- Leigh Snowden, actress, is from Covington; her granddaughter was named Covington after her hometown.
- Fleming and Townsend country music duo from the 1920’s and 1930’s were from around Covington.
