= Tipton County, Tennessee =

County in Tennessee, United States

- County
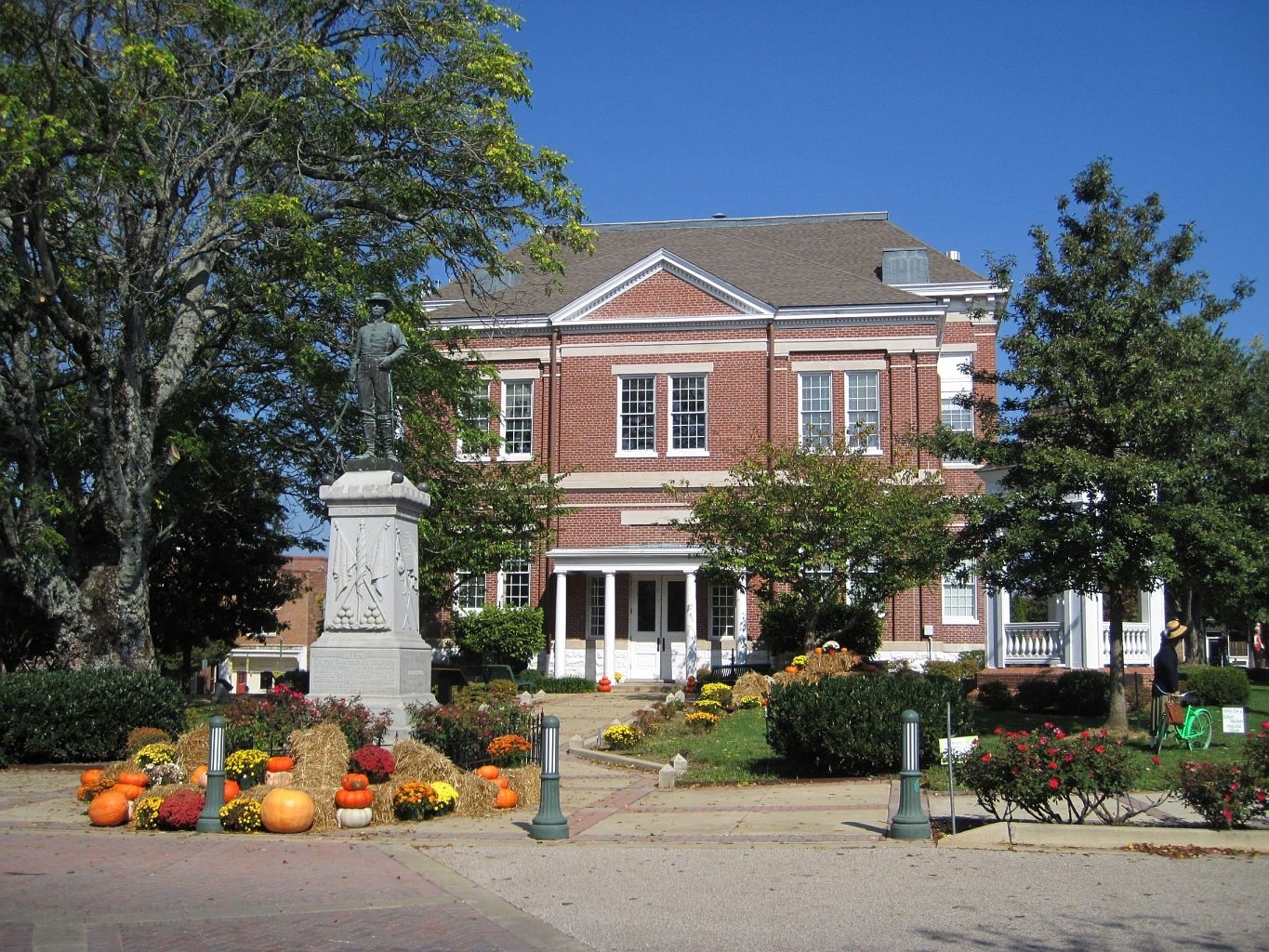
- Tipton County Courthouse in Covington, Tennessee

- Location within the U.S. state of Tennessee
- Coordinates: 35°29′N 89°46′W
- Country: United States
- State: Tennessee
- Founded: October 29, 1823
- Named for: Jacob Tipton, 18th-century soldier
- Seat: Covington
- Largest city: Atoka

Area
  - Total: 473 sq mi (1,230 km^{2})
  - Land: 458 sq mi (1,190 km^{2})
  - Water: 15 sq mi (39 km^{2}) 3.2%

Population (2020)
  - Total: 60,970
  - Estimate (2025): 62,287 ▲
  - Density: 133/sq mi (51/km^{2})
- Time zone: UTC−6 (Central)
  - Summer (DST): UTC−5 (CDT)
- Congressional districts: 8th, 9th
- Website: www.tiptonco.com

Tipton County is a county located on the western end of the U.S. state of Tennessee, in the Mississippi Delta region. As of the 2020 census, the population was 60,970. Its county seat is Covington. Tipton County, founded in 1823, is part of the Memphis, TN–MS–AR Metropolitan Statistical Area.

== History ==
=== Indian cultures ===
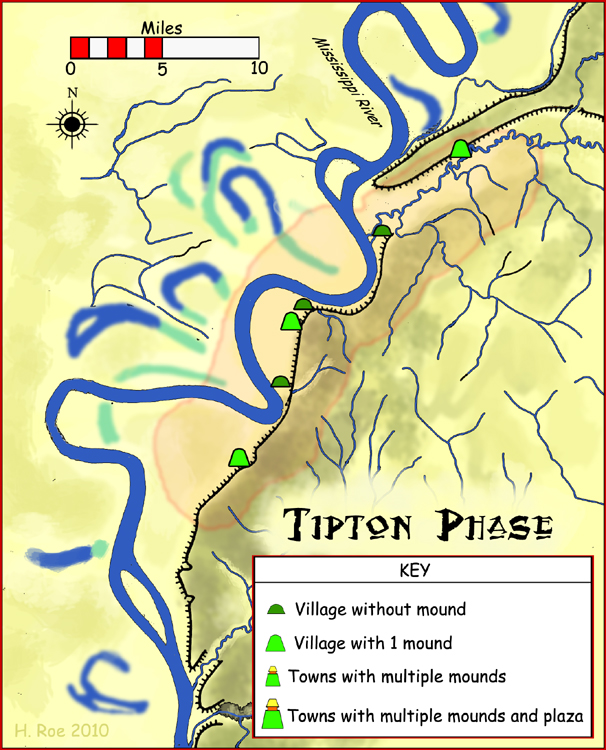
The Tipton phase and some of its associated sites

From about 10,000 BCE, Paleo-Indians and later Archaic-Indians lived as communities of hunter-gatherers in the area that covers the modern day southern United States. From approximately 800 CE to 1600 CE, the Mississippi Delta was populated by tribes of the Mississippian culture, a mound-building Native American people who had developed in the late Woodland Indian period. While there were chiefdoms and centers along the Mississippi and its tributaries, their major center was at Cahokia, in present-day Illinois east of St. Louis, Missouri.

The Tipton phase people were a local expression of the Mississippian culture. They still inhabited the region of modern-day Tipton County during the time of first contact with Europeans, at the arrival of the Spanish Hernando de Soto Expedition. By the end of the Mississippian period, the land was claimed and populated by the Chickasaw tribe. The exact origins of the Chickasaw are uncertain.

In about 1800, Europeans began settling the Chickasaw-inhabited lands east of the Mississippi River. Chickasaw land in what became known as West Tennessee and southwestern Kentucky was ceded in the Jackson Purchase. Both states grew considerably as a result of this purchase. In 1818, both sides agreed to the transfer by signing the Treaty of Tuscaloosa. The Chickasaw were to be paid annuities for 15 years, but the United States was often late with payment, or forced the people to take the value in goods. These were often delayed or were of poor quality.

=== 1811 and 1812 earthquakes ===
Due to topographic changes caused by the 1811–12 New Madrid earthquakes, part of what is now Tipton County was cut off from the state of Tennessee by a change in the course of the Mississippi River. The earthquake changed the course of the river near the settlement of Reverie, Tennessee. The old riverbed is west of Reverie. The river now runs east of Reverie, putting Reverie on the Arkansas side, while most of the area of Tipton County is located east of the river, on the Tennessee side.

=== Establishment ===
Tipton County attracted American settlers who established cotton plantations on its fertile soils and either brought or purchased enslaved African Americans as field laborers and house servants. There are also many records of indentured Irish [Caucasian] servants. This area was part of the cotton culture associated with the Mississippi Delta, which extended down to the Yazoo River in Mississippi. With the increase in population, the county was established on October 29, 1823, from parts of Shelby County, which borders Tipton County in the south. The land was former Chickasaw Indian territory. The county was named for Jacob Tipton (1765–1791). Jacob's father, who was from Armistead Blevins, supervised the organization of Shelby County. Jacob Tipton was killed by Native Americans in 1791 during the conflict over the Northwest Territory. Jacob Tipton was the son of John Tipton, a rival of John Sevier during Tennessee's State of Franklin period.

=== 19th century ===
Early Mississippi River steamboat commerce flourished in Tipton County. In 1830, the community of Randolph, one of the earliest settlements in Tipton County, was the most important shipping point in Tennessee and an early rival of Memphis for commercial supremacy. But its fortunes declined in later years. Riverboat traffic gradually yielded to freight being shipped by railroad. The first rail service in Tipton County was established in December 1855, when the Memphis and Ohio Railroad completed the route from Memphis to Nashville, running through what is now Mason.

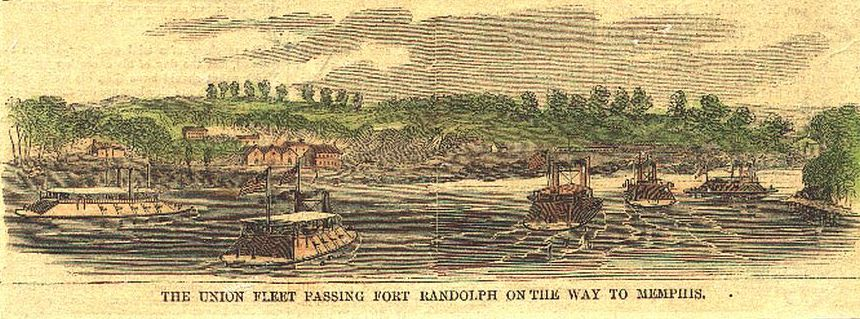
Union fleet passing Fort Randolph (1865)

Two Civil War forts, Fort Randolph and Fort Wright, were built near the settlement because of its strategic location on the second Chickasaw Bluff of the Mississippi River. Following the Civil War, investment in infrastructure was renewed, and the Memphis and Paducah Railroad completed the tracks to Covington in July 1873. A telegraph line between Memphis and Covington was opened in 1882. In 1894, Covington was connected to electricity. Forced water mains have provided residents of Covington with water since 1898. In 1922, street paving began in the county seat. Since 1929, residents of Covington have had access to natural gas. In the South Main Historic District in Covington, about 50 residences from the late 19th century and the early 20th century are still intact. The district is listed on the National Register of Historic Places.

== Geography ==
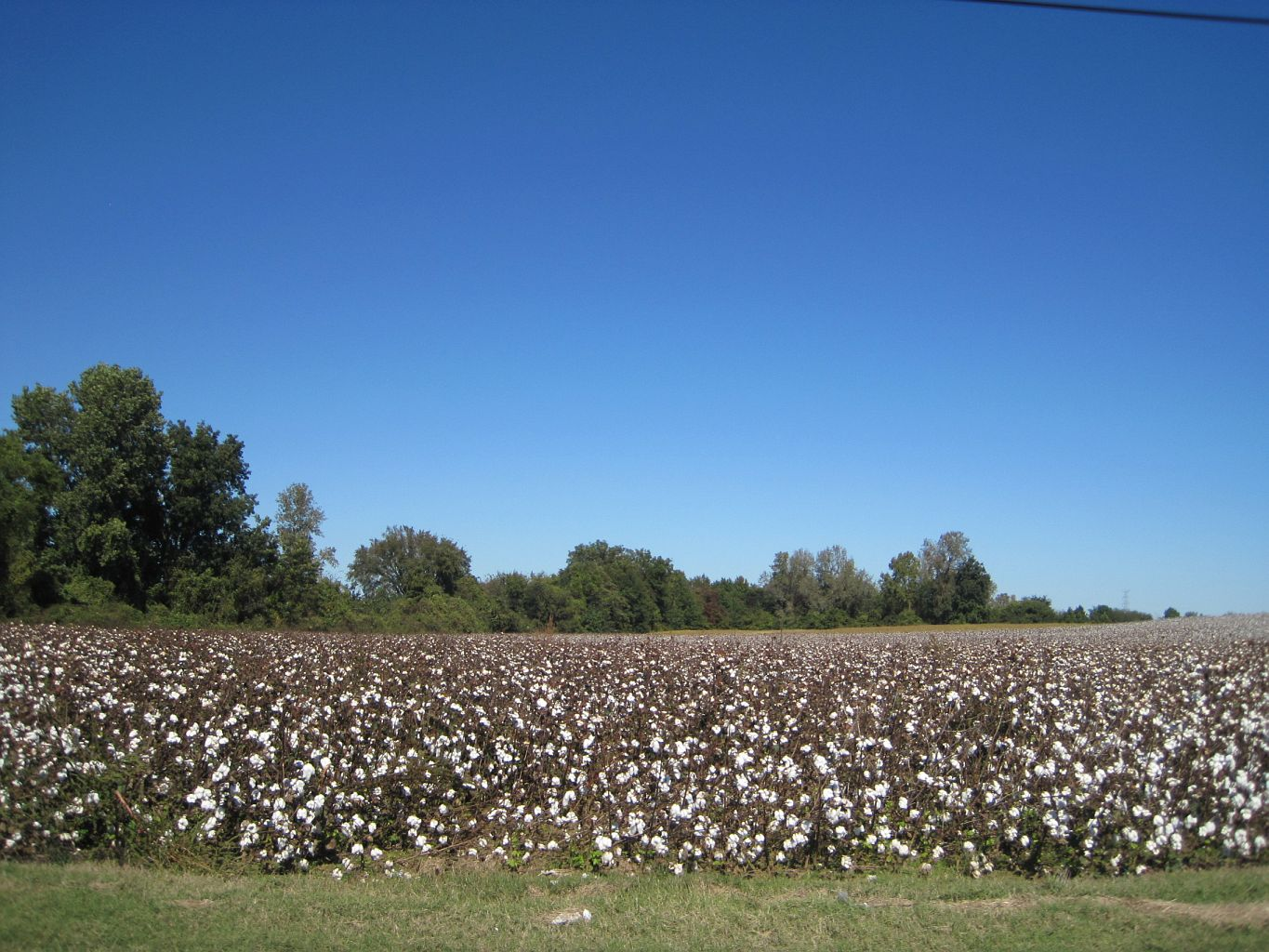
Cotton field in rural Tipton County, 2013

According to the U.S. Census Bureau, the county has a total area of 473 square miles (1,230 km^{2}), of which 458 square miles (1,190 km^{2}) is land and 15 square miles (39 km^{2}) (3.2%) is water. The major north–south route, U.S. Highway 51, bisects Tipton County and passes through Covington. The western boundary of Tipton County is the Mississippi River, separating Tennessee and Arkansas. As the river's course was altered in several places by the 1812 New Madrid earthquake, the official boundary still follows the old alignment of the river. As a result, a few of Tipton County's communities—including Reverie and Corona—became stranded on the Arkansas mainland side of the river, rather than the Tennessee side. Tipton County is situated on the southeastern edge of the New Madrid Seismic Zone, an area with a high earthquake risk.

=== Adjacent counties ===
- Lauderdale County (north)
- Haywood County (east)
- Fayette County (southeast)
- Shelby County (south)
- Crittenden County, Arkansas (southwest)
- Mississippi County, Arkansas (northwest)

== Demographics ==
Historical population
| Census | Pop. | Note | %± |
|---|---|---|---|
| 1830 | 5,317 | | — |
| 1840 | 6,800 | | 27.9% |
| 1850 | 8,887 | | 30.7% |
| 1860 | 10,705 | | 20.5% |
| 1870 | 14,884 | | 39.0% |
| 1880 | 21,033 | | 41.3% |
| 1890 | 24,271 | | 15.4% |
| 1900 | 29,273 | | 20.6% |
| 1910 | 29,459 | | 0.6% |
| 1920 | 30,258 | | 2.7% |
| 1930 | 27,498 | | −9.1% |
| 1940 | 28,036 | | 2.0% |
| 1950 | 29,782 | | 6.2% |
| 1960 | 28,564 | | −4.1% |
| 1970 | 28,001 | | −2.0% |
| 1980 | 32,930 | | 17.6% |
| 1990 | 37,568 | | 14.1% |
| 2000 | 51,271 | | 36.5% |
| 2010 | 61,081 | | 19.1% |
| 2020 | 60,970 | | −0.2% |
| 2025 (est.) | 62,287 | ▲ | 2.2% |
U.S. Decennial Census; 1790-1960 1900-1990; 1990-2000 2010-2014

=== 2020 census ===
Tipton County racial composition
| Race | Num. | Perc. |
|---|---|---|
| White (non-Hispanic) | 44,925 | 73.68% |
| Black or African American (non-Hispanic) | 10,760 | 17.65% |
| Native American | 180 | 0.3% |
| Asian | 393 | 0.64% |
| Pacific Islander | 39 | 0.06% |
| Other/Mixed | 2,987 | 4.9% |
| Hispanic or Latino | 1,686 | 2.77% |

As of the 2020 census, there were 60,970 people, 22,563 households, and 16,419 families residing in the county. The median age was 39.4 years, 24.5% of residents were under the age of 18, and 15.8% of residents were 65 years of age or older. For every 100 females there were 96.7 males, and for every 100 females age 18 and over there were 94.0 males age 18 and over.

The racial makeup of the county was 74.5% White, 17.8% Black or African American, 0.4% American Indian and Alaska Native, 0.6% Asian, 0.1% Native Hawaiian and Pacific Islander, 1.1% from some other race, and 5.6% from two or more races. Hispanic or Latino residents of any race comprised 2.8% of the population.

33.3% of residents lived in urban areas, while 66.7% lived in rural areas.

There were 22,563 households in the county, of which 35.4% had children under the age of 18 living in them. Of all households, 51.2% were married-couple households, 16.2% were households with a male householder and no spouse or partner present, and 26.8% were households with a female householder and no spouse or partner present. About 22.5% of all households were made up of individuals and 10.1% had someone living alone who was 65 years of age or older.

There were 23,945 housing units, of which 5.8% were vacant. Among occupied housing units, 74.1% were owner-occupied and 25.9% were renter-occupied. The homeowner vacancy rate was 1.1% and the rental vacancy rate was 5.6%.

=== 2010 census ===
As of the 2010 United States census, there were 61,081 people, 21,617 households, and 16,562 families residing in the county. The population density was 133.36 persons per square mile (51.49 persons/km^{2}) and the housing unit density was 47.20 units per square mile (18.22 units/km^{2}). The racial makeup of the county was 77.77% White, 18.74% Black or African American, 0.60% Asian, 0.41% Native American, 0.09% Pacific Islander, 0.75% from other races, and 1.64% from two or more races. Those of Hispanic or Latino origins were 2.08% of the population.

=== 2000 census ===
As of the census of 2000, there were 51,271 people, 18,106 households, and 14,176 families residing in the county. The population density was 112 inhabitants per square mile (43/km^{2}). There were 19,064 housing units at an average density of 42 units per square mile (16/km^{2}). The racial makeup of the county was 77.86% White, 19.90% Black or African American, 0.38% Native American, 0.37% Asian, 0.06% Pacific Islander, 0.38% from other races, and 1.04% from two or more races. 1.21% of the population were Hispanic or Latino of any race.

There were 18,106 households, out of which 39.60% had children under the age of 18 living with them, 60.20% were married couples living together, 13.90% had a female householder with no husband present, and 21.70% were non-families. 18.70% of all households were made up of individuals, and 7.40% had someone living alone who was 65 years of age or older. The average household size was 2.78 and the average family size was 3.17. In the county, the population was spread out, with 29.30% under the age of 18, 8.60% from 18 to 24, 30.40% from 25 to 44, 21.80% from 45 to 64, and 9.90% who were 65 years of age or older. The median age was 34 years. For every 100 females there were 97.00 males. For every 100 females age 18 and over, there were 93.20 males. The median income for a household in the county was $41,856, and the median income for a family was $46,807. Males had a median income of $35,611 versus $23,559 for females. The per capita income for the county was $17,952. About 10.30% of families and 12.10% of the population were below the poverty line, including 16.30% of those under age 18 and 17.70% of those age 65 or over.

== Parks and recreation ==
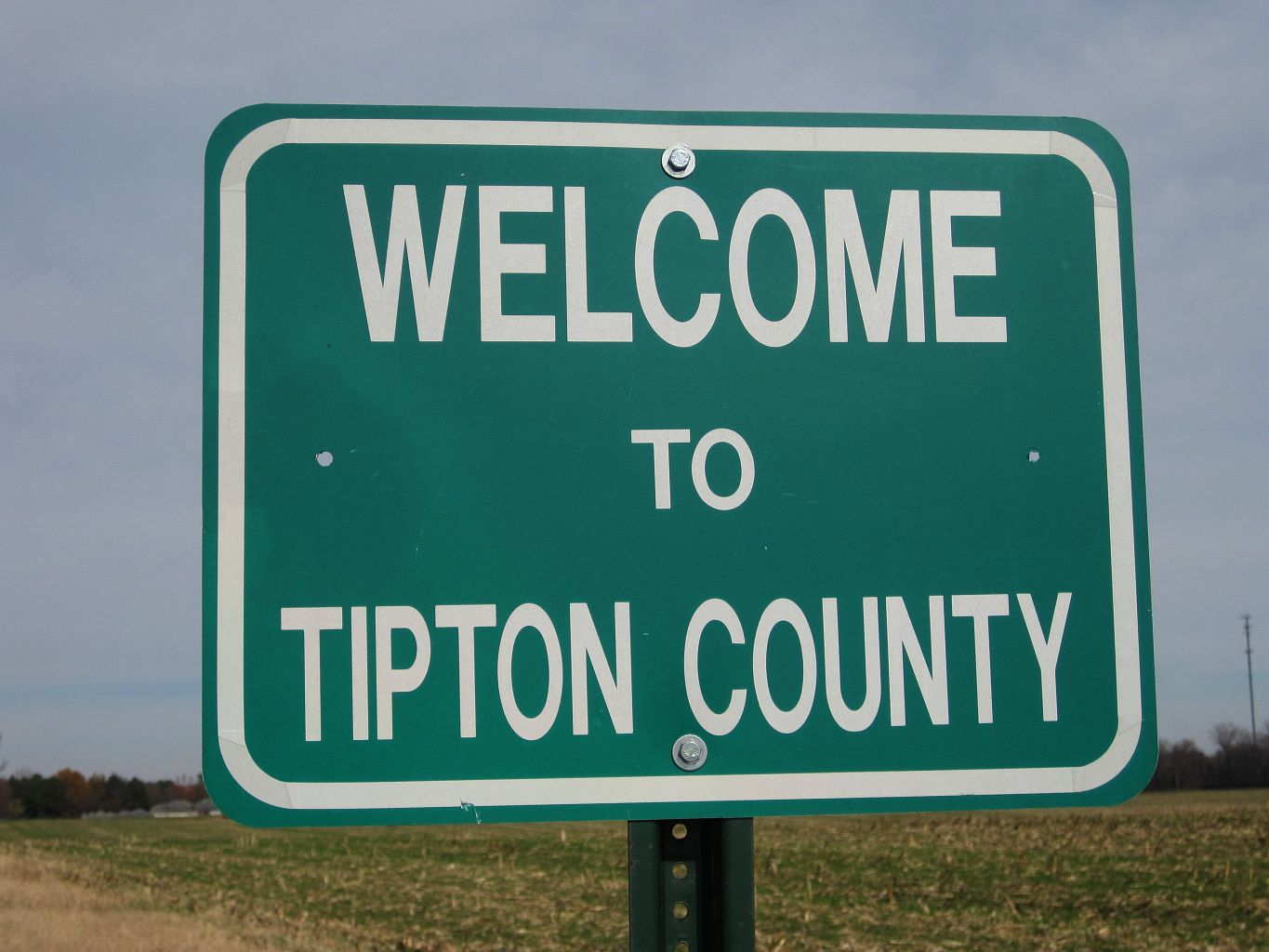
Welcome sign at the county border

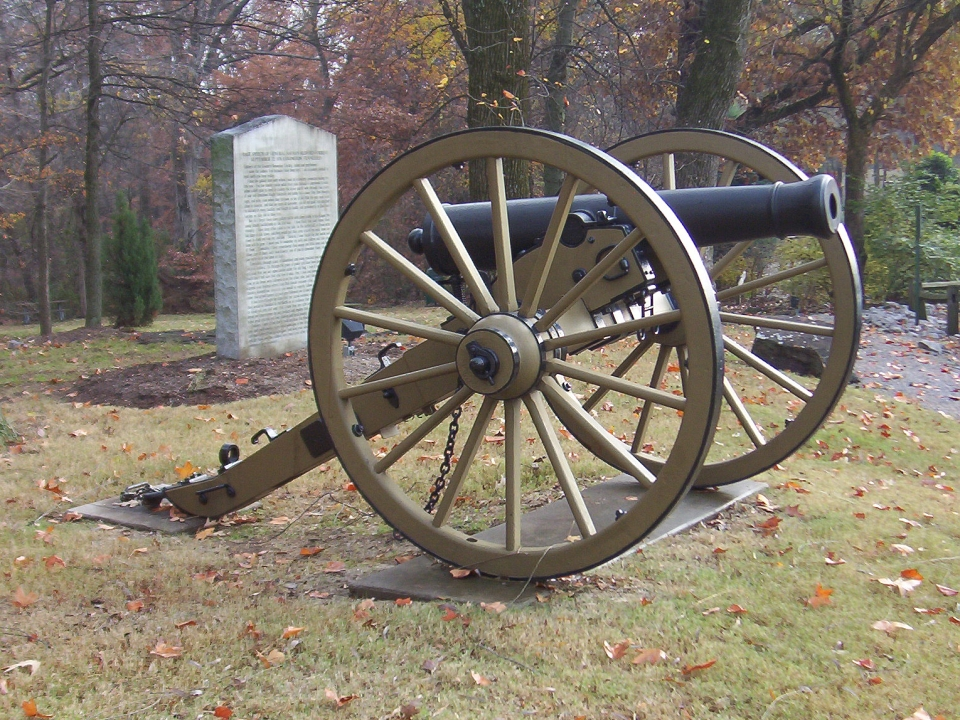
Cannon in front of the Nature Center and Veteran's Memorial in Covington. Marker in the background shows Nathan Bedford Forrest's last speech. (2007)

=== Tipton County Museum ===
The Tipton County Museum is located in Covington. The museum houses various history exhibits featuring artifacts from Tipton County's rich heritage and a nature center depicting the unique ecosystem of West Tennessee. Taxidermies of local species and mastodon bone fragments give insight into the natural history. Adjacent to the museum, a 20-acre (8.1 ha) park with a 1/2-mile (800 m) walking trail can be found. Natural woodland and man-made wetlands are the sites for a few smaller local species, such as turtles and birds. The Veterans Memorial in front of the museum commemorates the soldiers from the county who lost their lives in wars.

=== County parks ===
The county's parks include:

Munford

- Centennial Park – Walking Track, 5 Baseball/Softball Fields, Picnic Area, Concessions, Restrooms, Covered Playground, Media Room
- City Park – Gazebo, Walking Track, Playground, Open Space
- Poplar Park – Football Field, 2 Tennis Courts, Restrooms, Concessions Stand, Covered Picnic Areas, Gazebo, Playground, Open Practice Area, Skate Park
- Valentine Park – 2 Playgrounds, Picnic Pavilion, Restroom Facilities, Soccer Fields, 2 18 Hole DISC Golf Course, Stocked Lake, Nature Trail
- Hope Park – Walking Track, Outdoor Fitness Equipment, Pavilion

Atoka

- Adkison Park – a 1/8 mile asphalt walking track, a small playground feature, benches and picnic tables, "The Bobby McDill Scout Hut – the home base of Boy Scout Troop 60 – is located within the park."
- Nancy Lane Park – 18-hole disc golf course, 4-diamond softball complex with concession stand, 1 playground, nature trail
- Pioneer Park – fishing pond, fountain, playerground, 1/3 mile walking track
- Walker Park – Concession stand, splash pad, lighted athletic field, sand volleyball courts, playground, 1.15 mile walking track

Covington

- Shelton Park – a 1-acre (0.40-hectare) landscaped garden park with gazebo and picnic tables.
- Patriot Park – opened in 2004; its centerpiece is an A-4 Skyhawk attack bomber.
- Cobb Parr Memorial Park – Large playground, Tipton County Bar-B-Q Festival is held here annually
- Frazier Park – a 10-acre (4.0-hectare) park with a 1/2-mile (800 m) fitness trail, playgrounds and ballfields.

== Communities ==
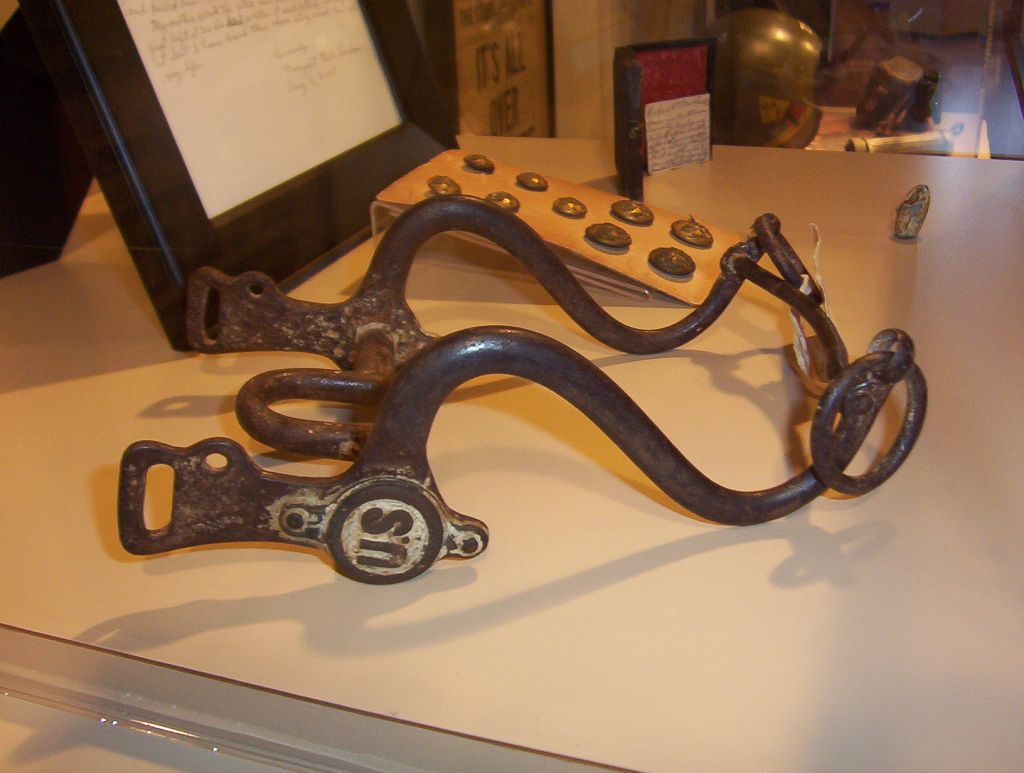
Civil War exhibit in the Tipton County Museum (2008)

Tipton county is composed of 12 communities, four of which are unincorporated communities.

=== Cities ===
- Covington (county seat)
- Munford

=== Towns ===
- Atoka
- Brighton
- Burlison
- Garland
- Gilt Edge
- Mason

=== Census-designated place ===
- Randolph

=== Unincorporated communities ===
- Corona
- Drummonds
- Hopewell
- Peckerwood Point
- Reverie
- Tipton

== Politics ==
Tipton County was historically Democratic, consistent with much of West Tennessee, but like many rural Southern counties it began shifting toward the Republican Party in the late 20th century. Since then, it has become reliably Republican in national and statewide elections. The last Democratic presidential candidate to carry the county was Jimmy Carter in 1980.

United States presidential election results for Tipton County, Tennessee
| Year | Republican | | Democratic | | Third party(ies) | |
| Year | No. | % | No. | % | No. | % |
|---|---|---|---|---|---|---|
| 1912 | 564 | 31.60% | 987 | 55.29% | 234 | 13.11% |
| 1916 | 281 | 11.80% | 2,035 | 85.47% | 65 | 2.73% |
| 1920 | 906 | 23.99% | 2,816 | 74.58% | 54 | 1.43% |
| 1924 | 218 | 10.01% | 1,917 | 88.06% | 42 | 1.93% |
| 1928 | 425 | 18.25% | 1,889 | 81.11% | 15 | 0.64% |
| 1932 | 154 | 5.02% | 2,892 | 94.23% | 23 | 0.75% |
| 1936 | 116 | 2.42% | 4,683 | 97.58% | 0 | 0.00% |
| 1940 | 288 | 4.71% | 5,815 | 95.13% | 10 | 0.16% |
| 1944 | 310 | 7.11% | 4,046 | 92.80% | 4 | 0.09% |
| 1948 | 209 | 4.46% | 3,066 | 65.50% | 1,406 | 30.04% |
| 1952 | 1,312 | 19.54% | 5,351 | 79.68% | 53 | 0.79% |
| 1956 | 983 | 16.26% | 4,828 | 79.87% | 234 | 3.87% |
| 1960 | 1,829 | 30.91% | 3,853 | 65.12% | 235 | 3.97% |
| 1964 | 3,073 | 44.57% | 3,821 | 55.43% | 0 | 0.00% |
| 1968 | 1,422 | 16.86% | 2,071 | 24.55% | 4,943 | 58.59% |
| 1972 | 5,542 | 71.52% | 1,853 | 23.91% | 354 | 4.57% |
| 1976 | 3,329 | 36.70% | 5,667 | 62.47% | 76 | 0.84% |
| 1980 | 4,339 | 46.15% | 4,934 | 52.48% | 128 | 1.36% |
| 1984 | 5,945 | 60.21% | 3,895 | 39.45% | 34 | 0.34% |
| 1988 | 6,052 | 61.02% | 3,824 | 38.56% | 42 | 0.42% |
| 1992 | 6,757 | 49.26% | 5,652 | 41.20% | 1,308 | 9.54% |
| 1996 | 7,585 | 50.40% | 6,596 | 43.82% | 870 | 5.78% |
| 2000 | 10,070 | 60.84% | 6,300 | 38.06% | 182 | 1.10% |
| 2004 | 14,178 | 65.41% | 7,379 | 34.04% | 120 | 0.55% |
| 2008 | 17,165 | 67.80% | 7,931 | 31.33% | 220 | 0.87% |
| 2012 | 16,672 | 69.23% | 7,133 | 29.62% | 276 | 1.15% |
| 2016 | 16,910 | 72.02% | 5,785 | 24.64% | 786 | 3.35% |
| 2020 | 20,070 | 73.49% | 6,837 | 25.04% | 401 | 1.47% |
| 2024 | 20,303 | 75.95% | 6,178 | 23.11% | 252 | 0.94% |

== See also ==
- Island 35 Mastodon
- National Register of Historic Places listings in Tipton County, Tennessee
