= Sidney Shlenker =

American businessman and sports team owner

- Born: August 14, 1936; Monroe, Louisiana
- Died: April 23, 2003 (aged 66); Los Angeles, California
- Occupation: Businessman
- Spouse: Denise
- Children: Three

Sidney L. Shlenker (August 14, 1936 – April 23, 2003) was an American businessman. He was the team president of the Houston Astros of Major League Baseball and the owner of the Denver Nuggets of the National Basketball Association.

== Early life ==
Shlenker was born in Monroe, Louisiana. His family moved to Houston two years later. He graduated from St. John's School in Houston, and attended Tulane University, but dropped out without graduating.

== Career ==
Shlenker met Roy Hofheinz, the owner of the Houston Astros of Major League Baseball and the Astrodome. Shlenker began promoting non-sporting events held at the Astrodome. In 1966, Shlenker and Allen Becker founded Pace Management Company, which focused on event promotion. In 1975, the Astros hired Shlenker as their president. He fired Spec Richardson, the team's general manager, and hired Tal Smith. Shlenker became a part-owner of the Houston Rockets of the National Basketball Association (NBA) in 1982.

In May 1985, he bought the NBA's Denver Nuggets for $20 million. He reached an agreement with the city of Denver to renovate the McNichols Arena. Shlenker also owned the Denver Dynamite of the Arena Football League (AFL). He refused to operate by the financial rules of the AFL, and suspended the team's operations after one season. In June 1987, the Major Indoor Soccer League granted a conditional franchise to Shlenker, to begin play in the 1988–89 season. The team, tentatively named the "Denver Desperados", attracted deposits for 400 season tickets within four months, short of the required 5,000; the franchise was revoked in November 1987. In September 1988, Shlenker purchased the Colorado / Denver Rangers of the International Hockey League. He declared the team bankrupt in June 1989. Shlenker sold the Nuggets in November 1989 for $65 million.

Shlenker then moved to Memphis, Tennessee, where he managed the construction of the Memphis Pyramid. In 1991, he was removed from the project after failing to obtain financing and his company filed for bankruptcy. The year before, Shlenker's plans to remove the Mississippi River Museum on Mud Island to make space for bars and restaurants fell through thanks to intervention of the West Tennessee Historical Society, the Mud Island Foundation, and then-Mayor of Memphis, Richard Hackett.

== Personal life ==
Shlenker testified in the trial of Heidi Fleiss, the "Hollywood Madam", in 1995. As a former customer, he received immunity for his testimony.

Shlenker suffered a spinal cord injury in a 1998 motor vehicle accident on U.S. Route 395 in Big Pine, California. The accident left him paralyzed from the waist down.

Shlenker had three children. He and his first wife, Marti, divorced in 1990. He later married his second wife, Denise. Shlenker died of heart failure at Cedars-Sinai Medical Center on April 23, 2003.
