= Chubby Creek =

Chubby Creek may refer to:

- Chubby Creek (Gum Creek tributary), a creek in Itawamba County, Mississippi
- Chubby Creek (Wolf River tributary), a creek in Benton County, Mississippi
