= Memphis River Parks Partnership =

Nonprofit organization in Tennessee, U.S.

- Abbreviation: MRPP
- Formation: 2018
- Tax ID no.: 62-1811726
- Headquarters: 22 N Front St 960, Memphis, Tennessee 38103
- CEO: Paul Chandler
- Website: www.memphisriverparks.org

The Memphis River Parks Partnership (MRPP), known as the Riverfront Development Corporation (RDC) until being renamed in April 2018, is a nonprofit organization that manages and develops the various riverfront parks and amenities located along the Mississippi River in Memphis, Tennessee on behalf of the Memphis city government.

== History ==
The MRPP was founded as the Riverfront Development Corporation (RDC) in 2000. The corporation was initially conceived to maintain and enable private investment in the five miles of parks along the Mississippi River in Memphis. RDC's first riverfront renovation plan was met with pushback from Friends for Our Riverfront, a citizen advocacy organization.

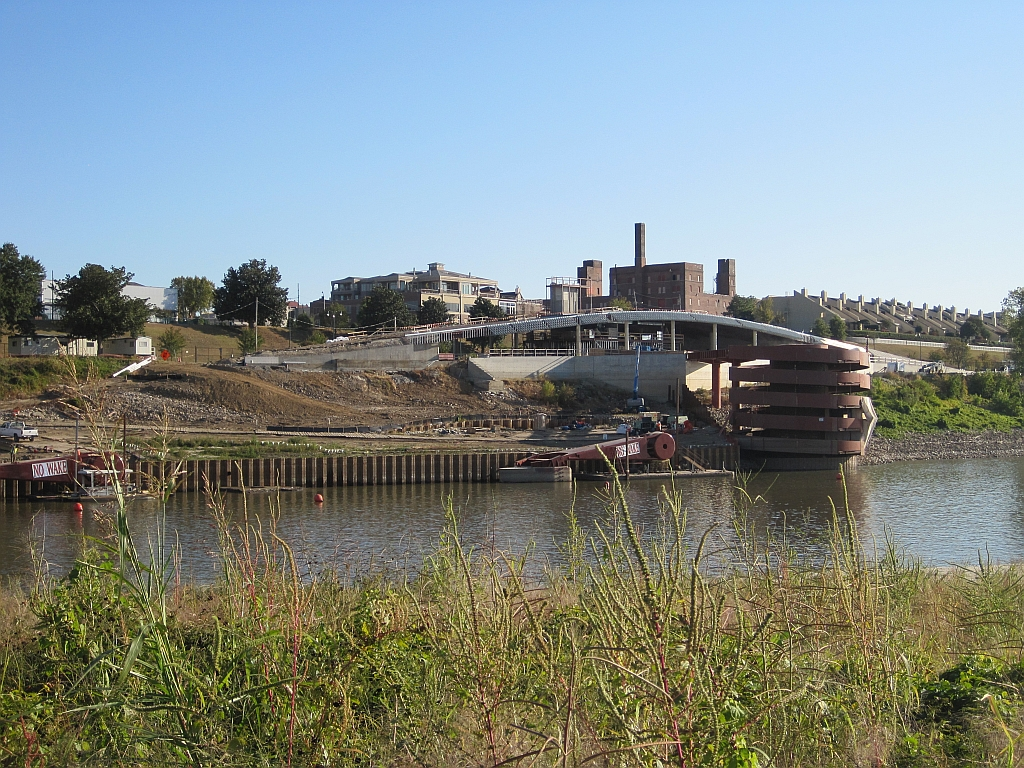
Beale Street Landing during construction in 2012

The RDC's largest project, the construction of a new dock called Beale Street Landing to be used by cruise ships and other vessels stopping in Memphis, was troubled by delays and cost overruns. Beale Street Landing finally opened in June 2014, but public confidence in the corporation was already shaken.

This negative public image, compounded by regular budgetary issues preventing the corporation from taking on more effective and ambitious plans towards improving riverfront amenities, led the RDC to rebrand itself as the Memphis River Parks Partnership, as part of a larger effort to revitalize the organization. This revitalization effort, launched by Carol Coletta upon her becoming CEO of the organization in April 2018, centered upon the implementation of the Memphis Riverfront Concept, which "calls for a series of small, elegant, connected moves along the riverfront that maximize the parks already in place and lay the groundwork for catalytic change in downtown and adjacent neighborhoods." Part of the plan included a new "River Line" trail, which would connect the five riverfront park districts located around the city.

Upon its inception, the Partnership made many fast changes including bringing a new program schedule to the riverfront. New events included yoga, skate nights and nighttime kayaking. Progress on the riverfront concept also moved quickly. In November 2018, the first projects, River Garden and River Line were completed. River Garden was formerly Jefferson Davis Park, then Mississippi River Park when the Confederate names were removed. The new park brought native plants, a pavilion and play/climbing structure and even life-sized bird nests to what was formerly an open field. Parts of the park were designed and built by students from Shelby County Schools. In February 2019, the MRPP unveiled a $60-million plan to redesign Tom Lee Park. The initial design included improved pedestrian connections to downtown and outdoor classroom space, and was anchored by a pavilion with basketball courts designed to be used as a concert venue. However, the plan drew criticism from organizers and fans of the Memphis in May music festival (held annually in the park), who claimed that the park's redesign would make it less suited to large crowds, essentially forcing the festival out of its traditional venue. Meanwhile, park supporters claimed that the new park would be both an improved experience for the public outside of festival season and maintain the ability to host large-scale events.

The dispute between the MRPP and Memphis in May organizers was resolved in December 2019 following a months-long mediation process overseen by retired Tennessee Supreme Court justice Janice M. Holder and held at the urging of Memphis mayor Jim Strickland. The mediation agreement laid out detailed specifications for the new park that were requested by Memphis in May. New plans for Tom Lee Park's redesign, designed to specifications requested by the festival, were unveiled in May 2020.

Residents also questioned the MRPP's ability to maintain a renovated Tom Lee Park due to the quality of maintenance at other riverfront parks under its control. One example was in September 2019, when MRPP maintenance crews were caught dumping mud that had washed onto the Beale Street Landing into the Mississippi River without a permit, prompting a response by the Army Corps of Engineers.

The Partnership has also been lauded for its work to transform the Memphis riverfront including formerly-Confederate parks. In March 2019, visitors from across the country came together in Memphis to tour "The Fourth Bluff", an area that includes River Garden, Fourth Bluff Park, Cossitt Library and parts of the River Line Trail.

== Responsibilities ==
=== Parks ===
Parks: 1 - Greenbelt Park 2 - Mud Island Park 3 - Fourth Bluff Park 4 - River Garden 5 - Tom Lee Park 6 - Ashburn-Coppock Park 7 - Martyrs Park 8 - E.H. Crump Park 9 - Chickasaw Heritage Park 10 - Martin Luther King Jr. Riverside Park

Memphis River Parks Partnership manages 12 city-owned parks along six miles of the Mississippi River. Notable parks managed by MRPP include Mud Island Park and Tom Lee Park. The northern parks form the River Line, a series of trails connecting Big River Crossing to the Wolf River Greenway.

==== Fourth Bluff Park ====
Fourth Bluff was the second park to be transformed by the Partnership in 2019. It has hosted various art installations including the Peace Project, the work of artists from South Memphis as well as a temporary installation of public art by artists Hank Willis Thomas. The park has become a popular civic gathering space and is the home of the Memphis Grizzlies official playoff watch parties bringing crowds of thousands of Memphians together to celebrate atop what was once home to a Confederate statue. The Partnership's work in reactivating public space after removing Confederate monuments has been promoted as an example for other cities struggling to animate places that once held Confederate monuments.

=== Events ===
Memphis River Parks Partnership hosts several events and activities. Since 2024, it has hosted the Riverbeat Music Festival and SmokeSlam BBQ competition in Tom Lee Park, replacing the long running Memphis in May festival which was previously located there.
