= Holly Springs National Forest =

Nature area in Mississippi, United States

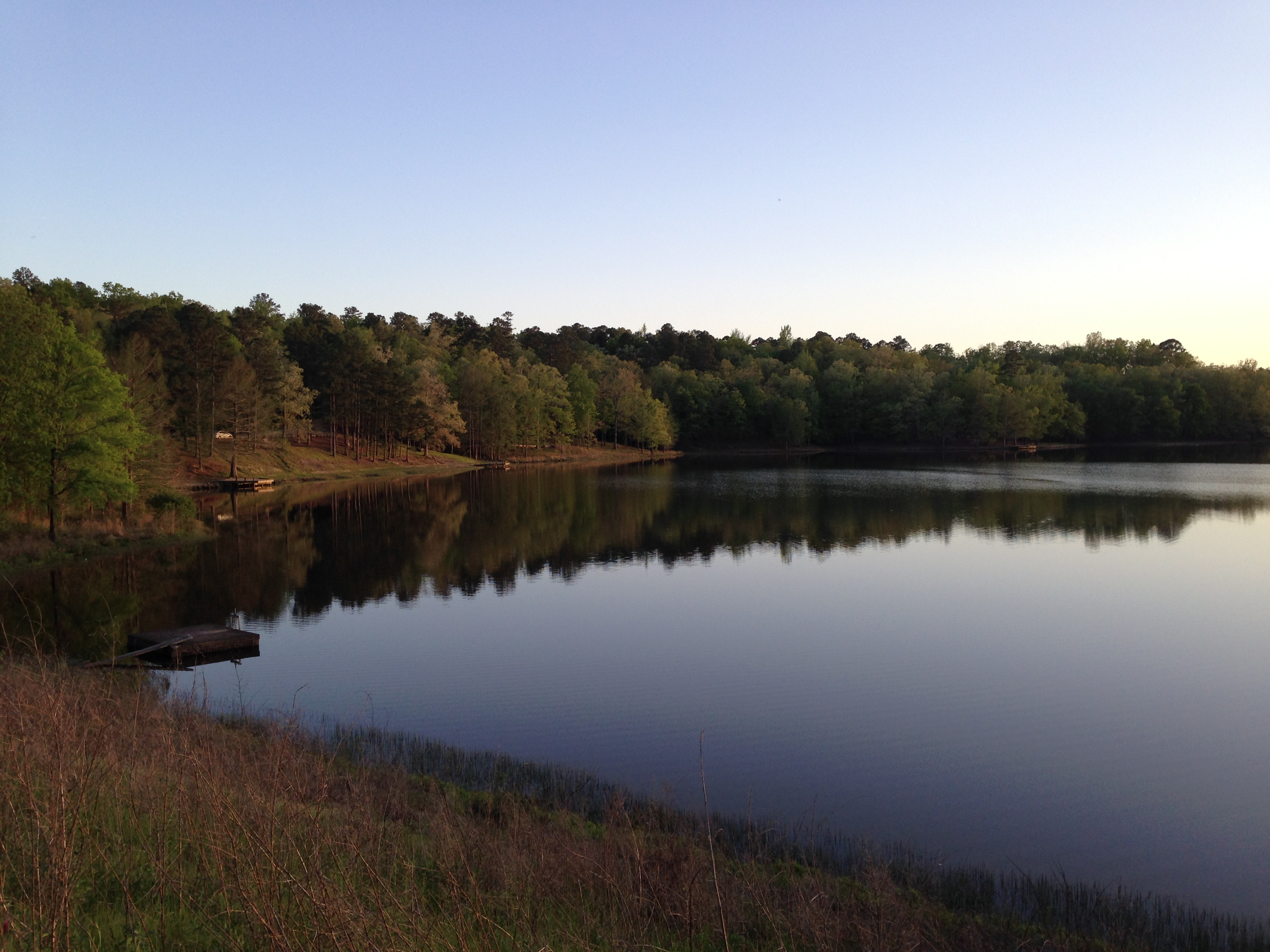
- Puskus Lake in Holly Springs National Forest

- Location within the United States
- Location: Northern Mississippi
- Nearest city: Tupelo, Mississippi
- Coordinates: 34°44′00″N 089°08′00″W
- Area: 155,661 acres (629.94 km^{2})
- Established: June 15, 1936
- Governing body: US Forest Service
- Website: National Forests in Mississippi

The Holly Springs National Forest (HSNF) was established by the United States Forest Service on June 15, 1936, during the tenure of United States Department of Agriculture Chief Forester Ferdinand A. Silcox. That same year, it was combined administratively with the Bienville, De Soto and Homochitto national forests, known collectively as "National Forests in Mississippi". The Holly Springs Ranger District controls 155,661 acres (243.2 sq mi) of Forest Service land, interspersed with 530,000 acres (828.1 sq mi) of privately owned properties, within the national forest's proclamation zone.

Before the HSNF was established, much of the land was abandoned agricultural land with rapidly eroding soils. These rolling hills are now covered with loblolly and shortleaf pines, and upland hardwoods. The Civilian Conservation Corps used loblolly pine because it was easy to plant, was suitable for the depleted soils of the north central hills, and cast a large load of needles to help prevent further erosion. The land owned by the Forest Service is intermingled with private farms and woodlots. The district ranger for the HSNF is headquartered in Oxford, Mississippi.

In 1983, the Reagan administration proposed auctioning off the entire national forest to private bidders as part of a nationwide asset management program. The plan was largely abandoned.

== Location ==
The HSNF is located in northern Mississippi and is divided into two major sections. The largest section lies to the southeast of the city of Holly Springs and straddles U.S. Highway 78. The second section 20,776 acres (84.08 km^{2}), sits about 40 miles (64 km) southwest of the main section, in Yalobusha County, between Coffeeville and Oakland, just east of Interstate 55. In descending order of land area the forest is located in parts of Benton, Lafayette, Marshall, Yalobusha, Tippah, and Union counties.

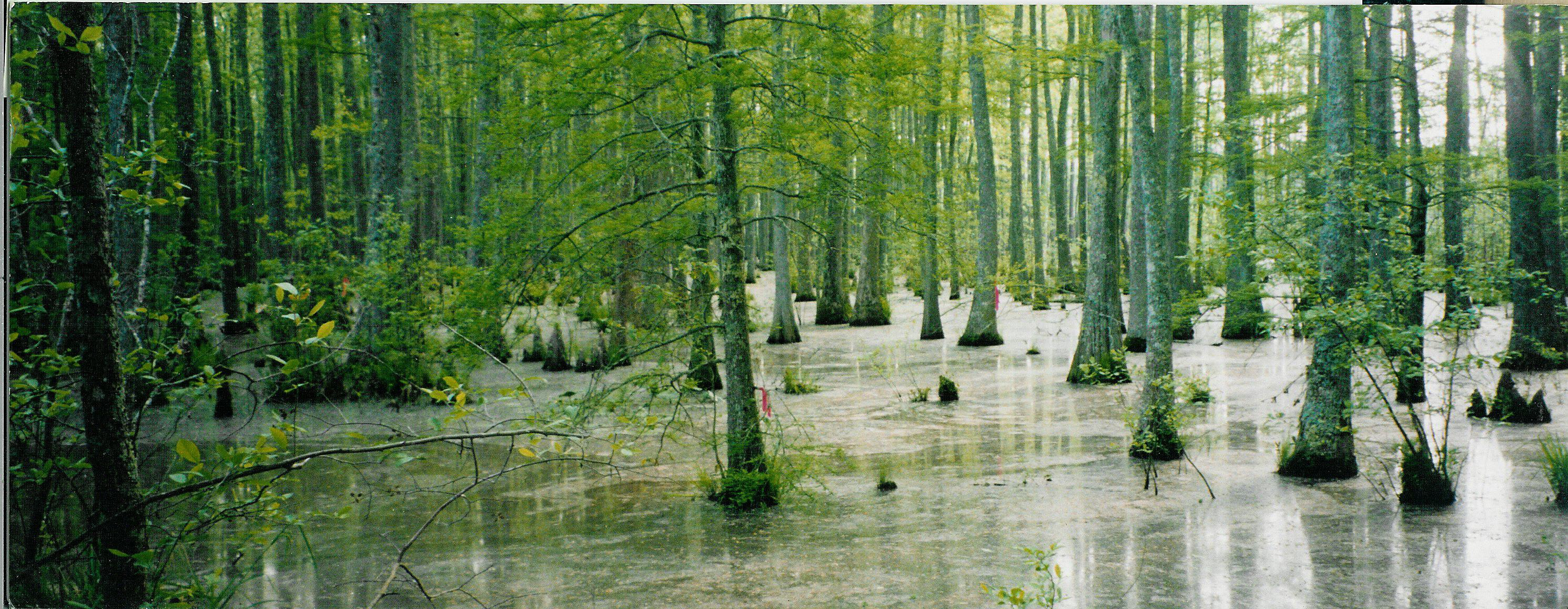
Bottomland hardwood swamp at the confluence of Tubby Creek and the Wolf River in the Holly Springs National Forest near Ashland, Mississippi. From this point, the Wolf River flows alternately west and north into West Tennessee, joining the Mississippi River in downtown Memphis, Tennessee.

== Recreation ==
The Chewalla Lake, Puskus Lake, Lake Tillatoba, Baker's Pond Hiking Trail, and North Cypress Non-Motorized Trail recreation areas are found in the Holly Springs National Forest, offering varying levels of facilities and services (campgrounds, picnic areas, swimming beaches and/or hiking trails).

The source of the Wolf River, Baker's Pond, is located in the northernmost tip of the national forest, approximately 1-mile (1.6 km) southwest of where U.S. Highway 72 crosses the border between Tippah and Benton counties. The Forest Service began working with the Wolf River Conservancy in 1999 to develop hiking trails there.

== See also ==
- List of national forests of the United States
