= Church of the River =

Church building in Memphis, Tennessee, US

Coordinates: 35.127°N 90.072°W

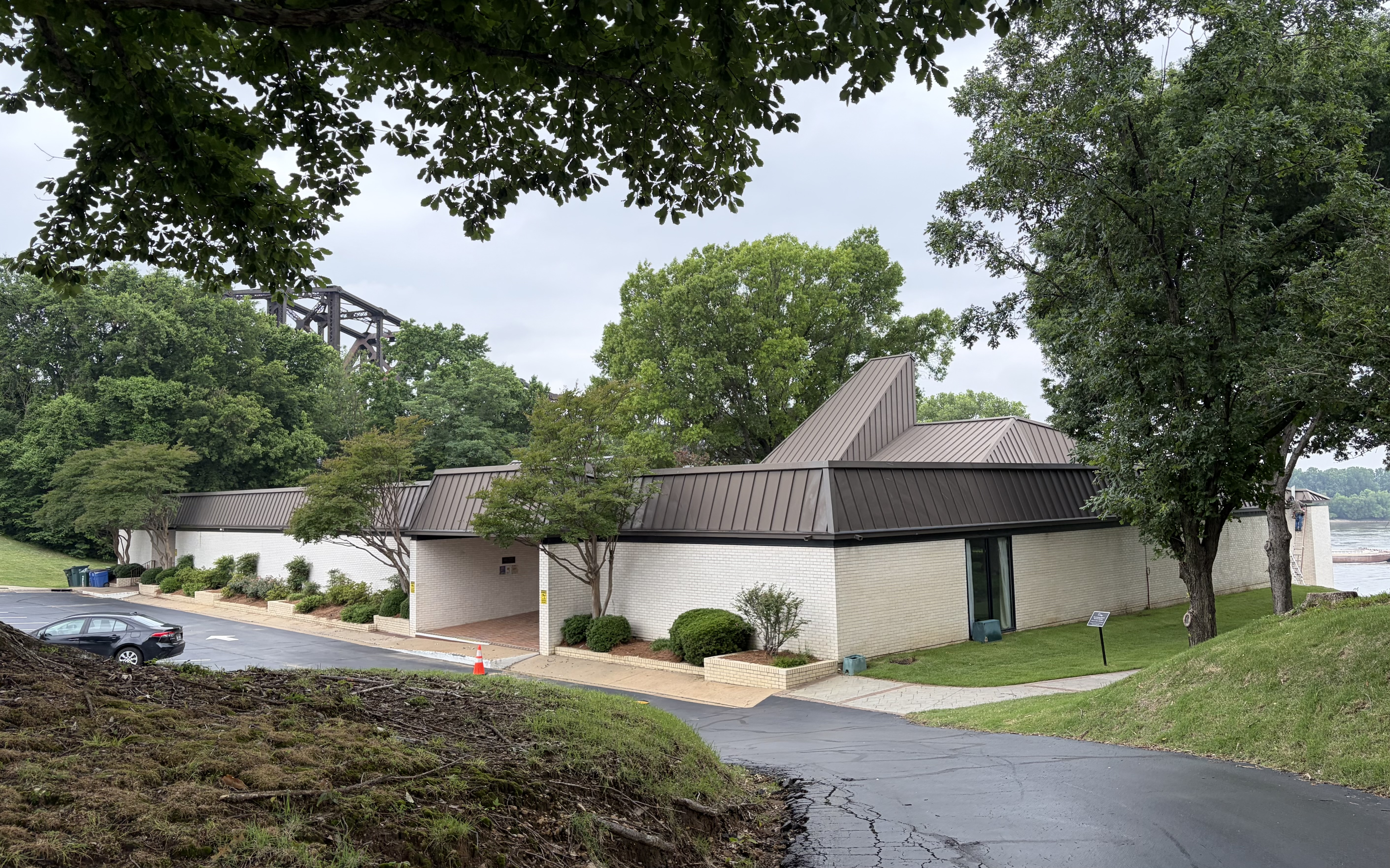
Church of the River in Memphis

The Church of the River, located in Memphis, Tennessee, is a member of the Unitarian Universalist Association, a liberal religious tradition.

Contemporary Unitarian churches have no creeds to which members must agree. Each congregation has its own covenant, or statement of purpose, which describes the spirit of how members are united in religious community. The Church of the River covenant states:

The purpose of this church shall be to promote the high ideals of a rational, progressive, and exalting religion, in the love of God and service to humanity, and to hold regular church services in this community. To this end, all activities of the church shall be conducted without distinction related to race, color, sexual orientation, gender identity or previous religious affiliations; and the right of private judgment and the sacredness of individual conviction shall be recognized in all things. To join our church is to walk with other members of the congregation in the spirit of our covenant.

== History ==
The Church of the River traces its roots to 1893. Edward Everett Hale, Unitarian minister and author of The Man Without a Country, was instrumental in influencing the church's first minister, Frederick Preston, to come to Memphis. From the fall of 1898 to about 1900, there were no regular ministers. But the congregation regrouped, and was chartered as the First Unitarian Church of Memphis in 1912. In 1965, the church moved to its current location on the Fourth Chickasaw Bluff facing the Mississippi River, and has become known as the Church of the River. The building, constructed from an award-winning design by architect and church member Roy Harrover, features five floor-to-ceiling windows in the sanctuary that look out over the river. Long-time minister Rev. Burton Carley retired in 2015. Reverend Sam Teitel succeeded Rev.Carley from 2017 to 2025.
