= Mississippi River Museum =

Museum in Memphis, Tennessee, United States

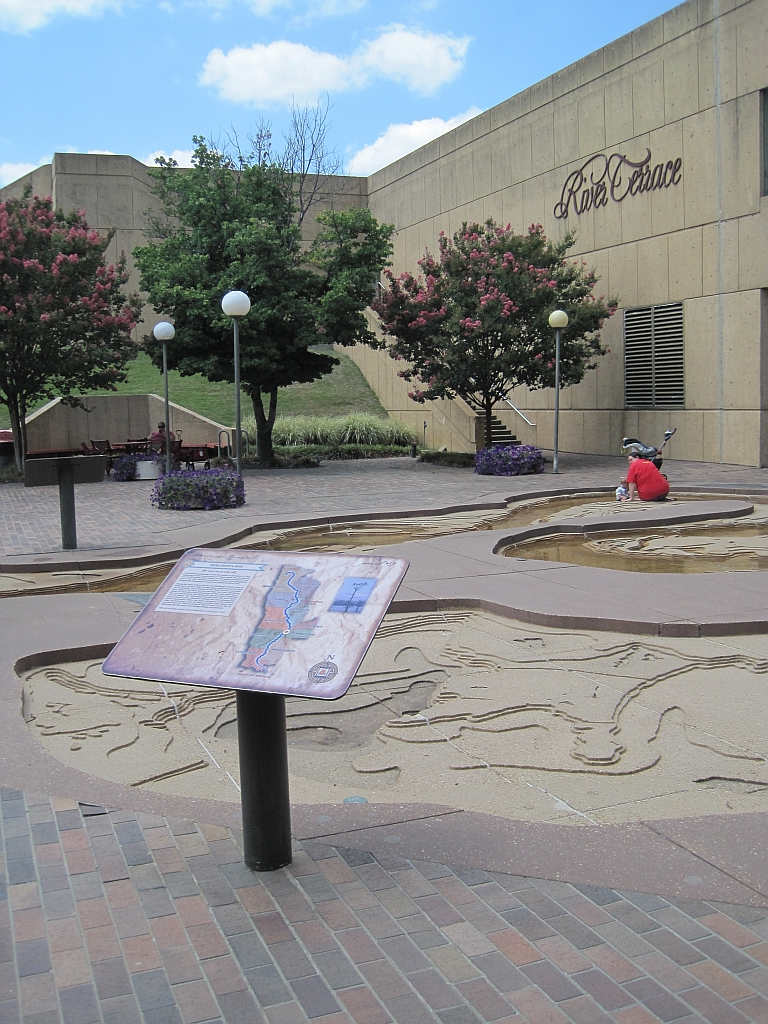
- The museum's entrance, featuring a scale model of the Mississippi River.
- Established: 1982
- Location: Mud Island, Memphis, Tennessee
- Coordinates: 35.1494°N 90.0583°W
- Type: History, naval, music
- Director: Carol Coletta (as of July 2020)
- Website: www.memphisriverparks.org/parks/mud-island/

The Mississippi River Museum was a museum located on Mud Island, in Memphis, Tennessee.

== History ==
The museum opened in 1982 with the goal of "preserv[ing] and promot[ing] the natural and cultural history of the Lower Mississippi River Valley".

In 1990, businessman Sidney Shlenker (known locally for managing construction of the Memphis Pyramid) planned to shut down the museum to make space for new bars and restaurants on the island. The announcement of these plans was met with backlash by the West Tennessee Historical Society, which cooperated with the Mud Island Foundation and then-Mayor of Memphis Richard Hackett to intervene and save the museum from closure.

In July 2018, the museum was temporarily closed for renovations, citing low attendance rates and a need to update outdated exhibits. The museum reopened in May 2019.

In August 2019, vandals broke into the museum, breaking display cases but not stealing or damaging any of the historical artifacts on display. Low attendance resulted in the museum's closure not long afterwards with the contents being transferred to the Museum of Science and History - Memphis. In 2024, plans were announced to redevelop the museum into an interactive experience titled "Baron Von Opperbean and the River of Time".

== Displays and exhibits ==
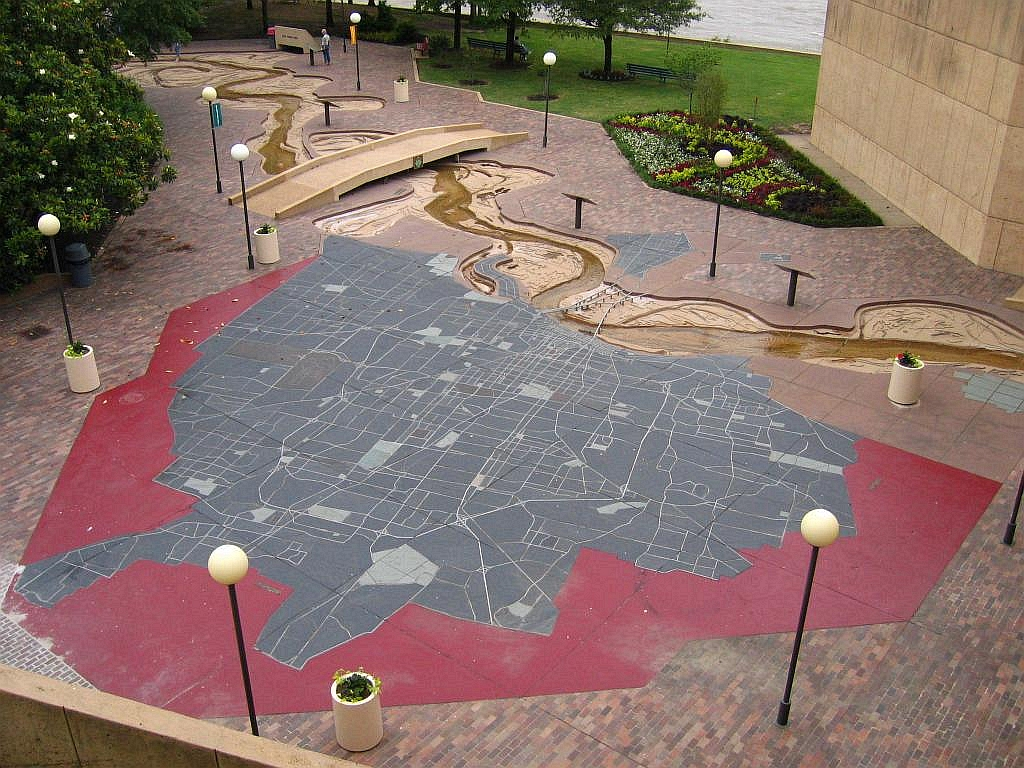
Overhead view of the Mississippi River scale model, showing the adjacent map of Memphis.

The museum was divided into 18 galleries, which displayed more than 5,000 Mississippi River-relevant historical artifacts altogether. Located just outside of the museum is a scale model of the river.

Several items relevant to the Mississippi River's role in the Civil War were on display, most notably a life-size replica of a Union City-class ironclad gunboat.

The museum was populated by wax sculptures of historical figures linked to the Mississippi River, such as Mark Twain and Mike Fink. A documentary on the several perils of traveling and living on the river (such as boiler explosions and yellow fever) was played at the "Theatre of Horrors". One of the museum's galleries was dedicated to the history of music on the river.

== See also ==
- List of maritime museums in the United States
