= Shelby Farms =

Public park in Shelby County, Tennessee

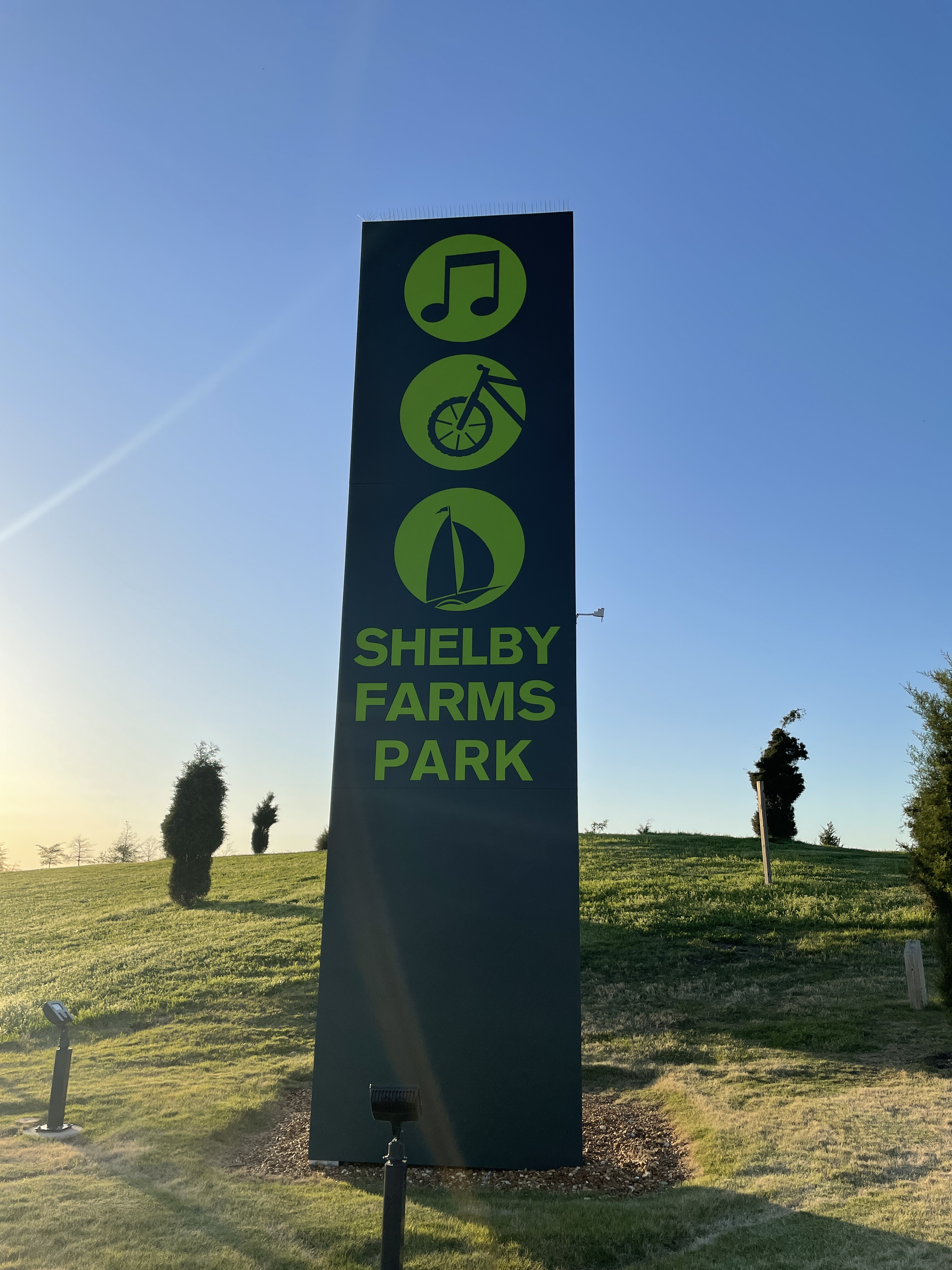
- Entrance sign at Shelby Farms Park.
- Interactive map of Shelby Farms
- Type: Public park
- Location: Memphis, Tennessee
- Coordinates: 35.1388°N 89.8325°W
- Area: 4,500 acres (1,800 ha)
- Created: 1970s
- Operator: Shelby Farms Park Conservancy
- Status: Open all year from dawn to dusk
- Public transit: MATA: 53

Shelby Farms is a public park located in Memphis, Tennessee, United States. It is one of the largest urban parks in the U.S. at a size of 4,500 acres (1,800 ha). Shelby Farms is owned by the Shelby County government and managed by the Shelby Farms Park Conservancy since 2007 under a public–private partnership. The conservancy provides for the daily operation of the park and plans for its future use.

The land Shelby Farms sits atop today was the site of the Nashoba Community, which was founded by humanist reformer Frances Wright in 1825. Throughout the 1800s, the commune provided practical and cultural education to emancipated slaves after they worked off the costs of their indentured servitude. From 1929 until 1964, Shelby Farms was used as a penal farm operated by the Shelby County Government. Shelby Farms was opened for recreational purposes in the 1970s. In 2008, a masterplan was put in place for the redesign of the park. The re-design provided additional hiking and biking trails as well as more opportunities for boating in an enlarged Hyde Lake, formerly known as Patriot Lake.

Shelby Farms contains lakes, natural forests, and wetlands which provide natural habitats for wildlife. Shelby Farms Park is also home to a bison herd.

== History ==
=== 19th century ===
In 1825, Frances Wright's Nashoba Experiment was formed on 670 acres of modern-day Shelby Farms Park north of Wolf River with the remainder in today's Germantown, Tennessee, south of Wolf River. On 1,940 acres (790 ha) of woodland, humanist reformer Frances Wright, an opponent of slavery, founded a multi-racial commune of slaves, free blacks and whites to prepare slaves and former slaves for their future freedom. Wright believed in the emancipation of slaves by providing education for them in practical and cultural skills.

Remains of an early settlement from the late 19th century can be found at the eastern tip of Shelby Farms Park, consisting of ruins of a residential building, a disintegrated barn, car wrecks dating from the 1950s and 1960s, old fences and a family burial site.

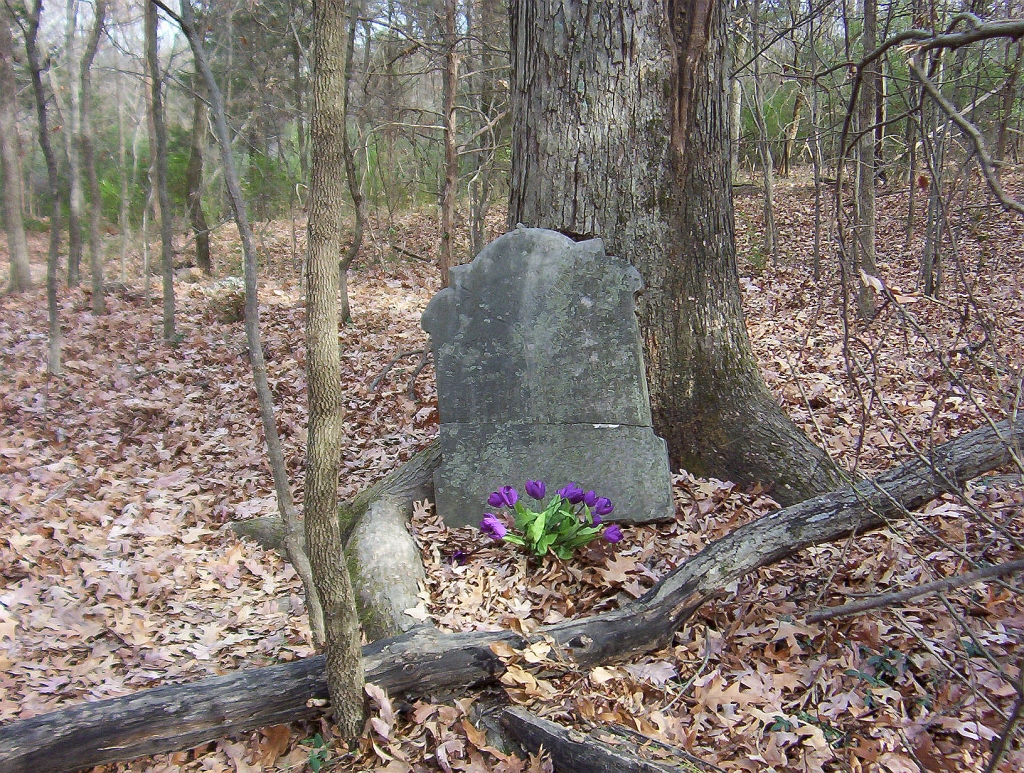
Mann family burial (2005)

In 2005, the family burial site of the Mann family exists with just one grave marker remaining. The last two documented deaths, as indicated on that remaining gravestone, date back to November 25, 1891, for Robert W. Mann and December 5, 1891, for Mary S. Mann. Five or more graves are marked only by their base stones.

Shelby County acquired 1,600 acres (650 ha) of land in 1928 for use as a penal farm. The remaining formerly private property of 2,900 acres (1,200 ha) was incorporated into the Penal Farm between then and December 1940, when the Shelby County Commission authorized the purchase of the final 1,383 acres (560 ha), bringing the total to 4,450 acres (1,800 ha).

=== 20th century ===
From 1929 until 1964, Shelby Farms was used as a penal farm, in which the prisoners of the Shelby County Corrections Center were involved in agricultural labor to provide food for inmates and staff, or to sell overproduction for profit on behalf of the state of Tennessee.

In 1966, the county planning commission proposed developing the former penal farm into a planned community. In 1967, the city and county officials listened to nine proposals from companies on various uses for the land. In 1970, the county created the nine-member Shelby Farms Development Board to oversee the project. On February 14, 1973, the Development Board approved a joint proposal by The Rouse Company, Boyle Investment Co, and First Tennessee National. On January 29, 1974, the group formally withdrew their proposal due to growing opposition from members of the Shelby County Court, who would need to approve the development. However, the court supported reserving the land for public use. In 1977, Plough Park, named in honor of local philanthropist Abe Plough, opened in the northeast portion of Shelby Farms. It included two fishing lakes, a horse stable, and picnic areas.

=== 21st century ===
The Shelby Farms Park Alliance (SFPA) was granted a conservation easement by the Shelby County Commission in December 2006. The easement restricts commercial and residential development in the park area for 50 years.

In 2007, an agreement was signed between the Shelby County Mayor A.C. Wharton and the SFPA, forming the Shelby Farms Park Conservancy (SFPC), a public and private non-profit partnership established by Shelby County government to help provide day-to-day operations of the park and to develop a planning process for the future of Shelby Farms Park.

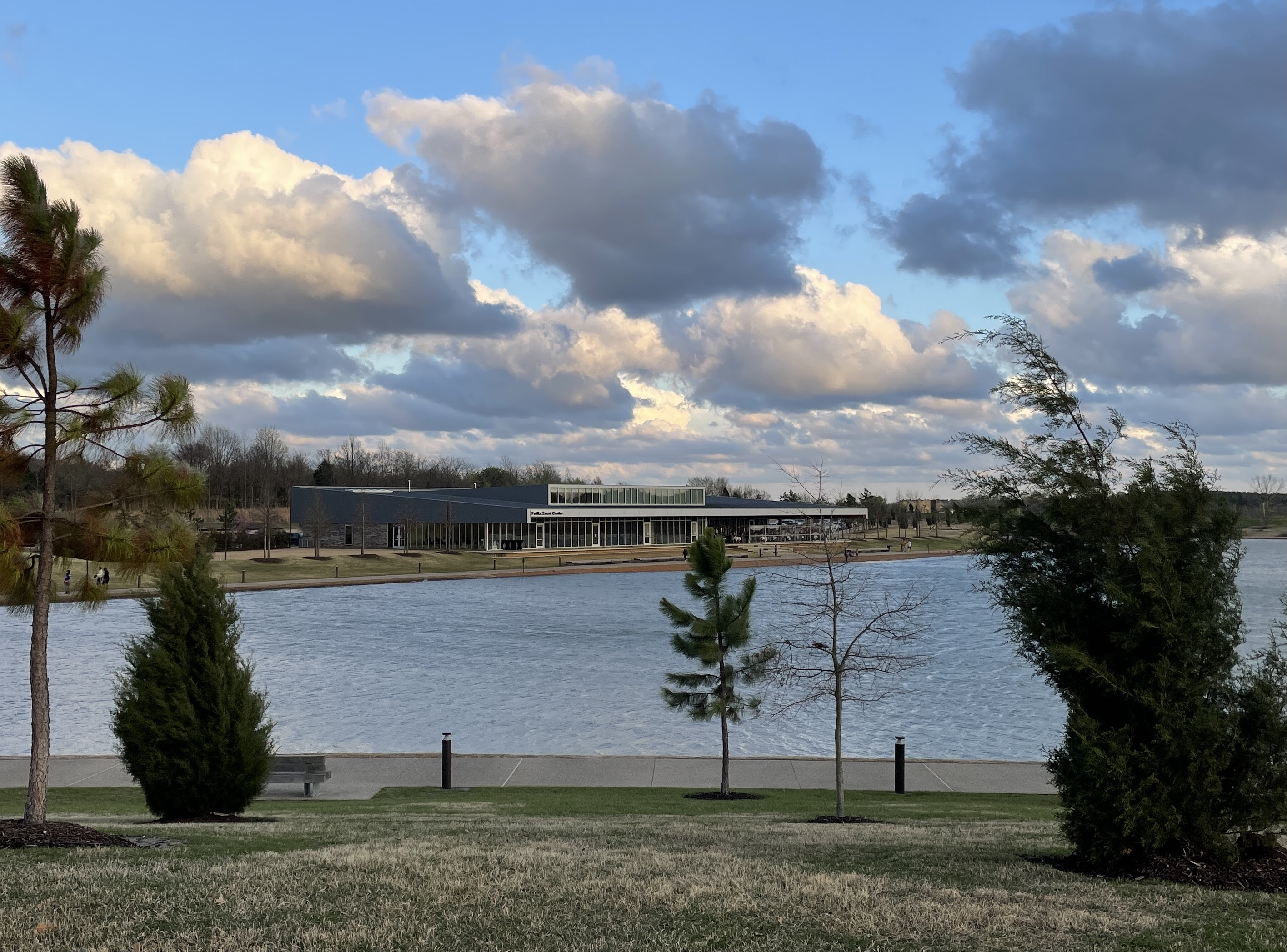
Hyde Lake and the FedEx Event Center

A master plan was put in place in 2008 to direct a major re-design of the park. This came to fruition in 2016, when Shelby Farms opened a $52 million expansion that included an enlargement of Patriot Lake (renamed Hyde Lake), the addition of new walking and biking trails, the construction of a new visitors center, and the planting of more than 1 million new trees across the park. In the year after Heart of the Park opened, park staff estimated that visitation to Shelby Farms had more than doubled. James Corner Field Operations (JCFO) located in New York won the SFPC's competition for the park's master plan. JCFO also partnered with Marlon Blackwell Architects (MBA) to design half-dozen new buildings.

== Geography ==
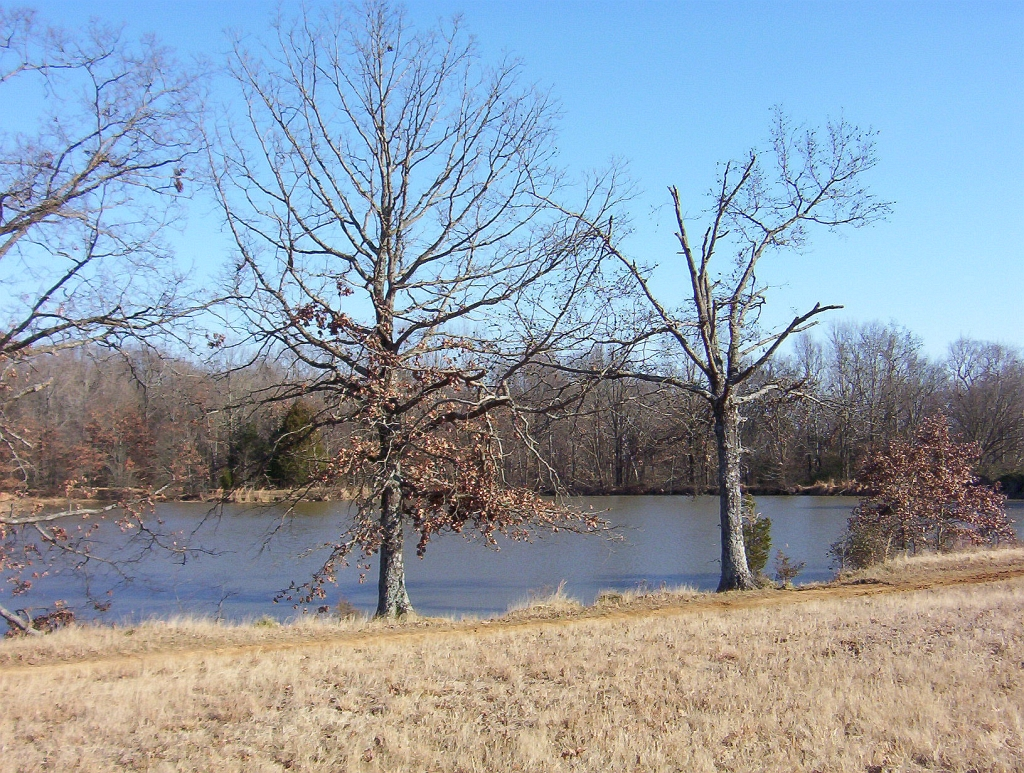
Scenic view in Shelby Farms Park (2005)

Encompassing about 4,500 acres (1,800 ha) of land, Shelby Farms is a large urban park in the United States and one of the largest in Tennessee. It is within the area of East Memphis Several lakes, natural forests, and the wetlands of the Wolf River are situated in hilly surroundings.

The northwest portion of the park is home to several Shelby County government facilities, including a prison and code enforcement offices. The eastern portion of the park contains the Agricenter, an agricultural research center hosting an arena, National Oceanic and Atmospheric Administration offices, and Ducks Unlimited's national headquarters.

== Wildlife ==
Wildlife, including beavers, deer, turtles, and different species of birds, can be observed in its natural environment. Although the park is surrounded by routes used by commuter traffic, smaller species can still find habitats large enough to survive.

Shelby Farms Park is home to a bison herd on 56 acres (23 ha) of pasture land. Former Shelby County Mayor Bill Morris was instrumental, along with park superintendent Tom Hill, in introducing the bison, which now number about 45.

== Recreation ==
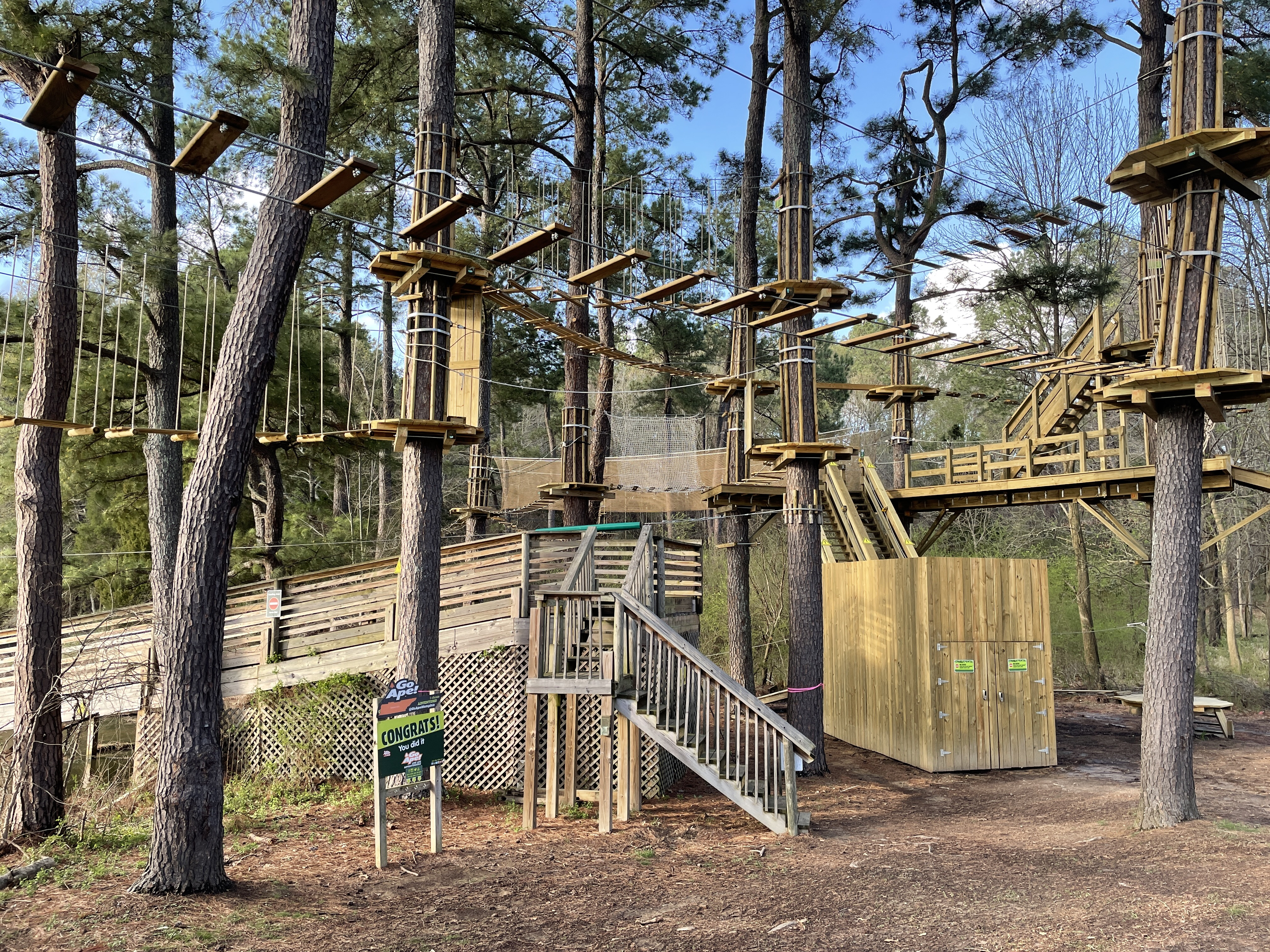
The Go Ape Zipline and Adventure Course

Hiking and biking trails meandering through the park allow visitors to observe wildlife and nature. On two lakes rowing boats are allowed. On one of the latter two lakes, Hyde Lake, pedal boats can be rented. There is also a 2.5-mile (4.0 km) paved trail around Hyde Lake. Another paved trail, the 2.75-mile (4.4 km) long Chickasaw Trail, is available to hikers. An unpaved trail, the Tour de Wolf, takes hikers and bikers through the woods of Shelby Farms Park for 6.08 miles (9.8 km). The paved trails are suitable for walking, running, biking, and roller-blading. The Tour de Wolf is suitable for walking, running, and mountain-biking. Off-leash dog activities are designated in a 120-acre (49 ha) area that includes meadows, lakes and hiking trails.

Horseback riding is allowed in parts of the park and on a few trails. Horses can be rented as well. A designated runway to start and land miniature radio-controlled aircraft is present in the park for public use.

An 18-hole disc golf course is located near the welcome center of the park.

A BMX race track sanctioned by USA BMX is located at 6435 Walnut Grove Rd.

== Transportation ==
Shelby Farms is traversed by two roads, Walnut Grove Road and Farm Road. There have been plans since the 1990s to replace Farm Road with a wider road going north from Walnut Grove Road to Whitten Road. In 1999, Friends of Shelby Farms sued the local government to halt a proposed road until a supplemental environmental impact study was conducted. In 2013, the Conservancy supported construction of the parkway on the condition that the project include pedestrian paths and tractor-trailers would be banned from the road. The project was scrapped by the City of Memphis in 2023.

=== Greenline ===
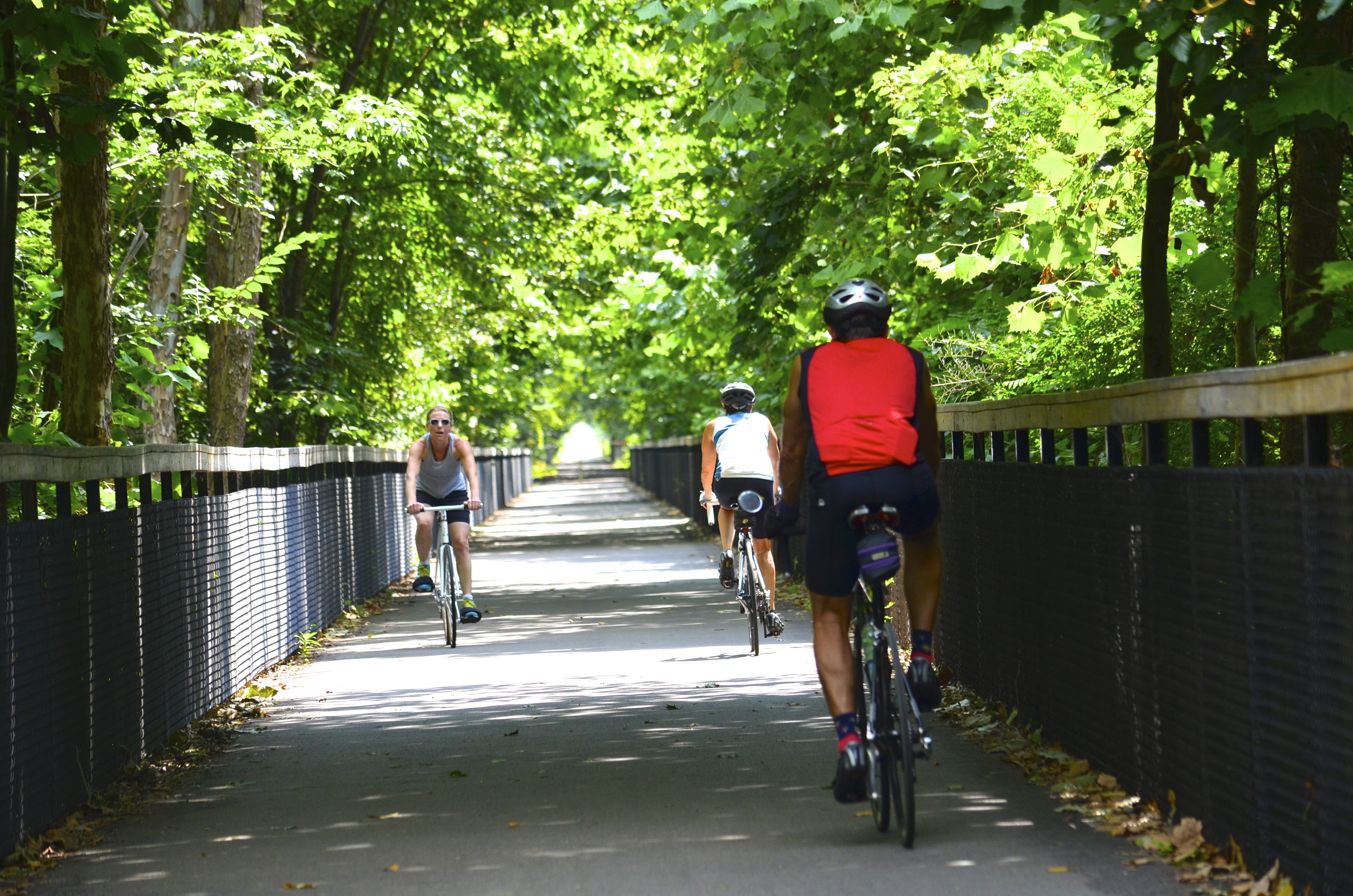
Cyclists on Greenline bridge

The Shelby Farms Greenline is a 12.49-mile (20.10 km) multi-use urban rail trail running from Shelby Farms to Tillman Street in the Binghampton neighborhood, near Midtown, Memphis. The trail was constructed over a closed CSX railway line. Shelby Farms Greenline is managed and operated by Shelby Farms Park Conservancy. The Greenline is the longest continuous urban trail in Shelby County. It is also the first trail in Tennessee to use a pedestrian hybrid beacon at two major crossings: Highland and Graham.

SFPC purchased the initial section of property for the Greenline from CSX in 2008. The section opened in October 2010. Construction on a $4.3 million extension to Cordova began in August 2015, with the section opening in June 2016. The trail was extended east again in October 2025, bringing the total length to 12.49 miles (20.10 km). There are plans to extend the Greenline west to Tobey Park, but construction has not begun yet as of 2024.

== See also ==
- List of urban parks by size
- Overton Park — park in Midtown, Memphis
- Wolf River Conservancy
