= Wolf River (Tennessee) =

Water course in Mississippi and Tennessee, United States

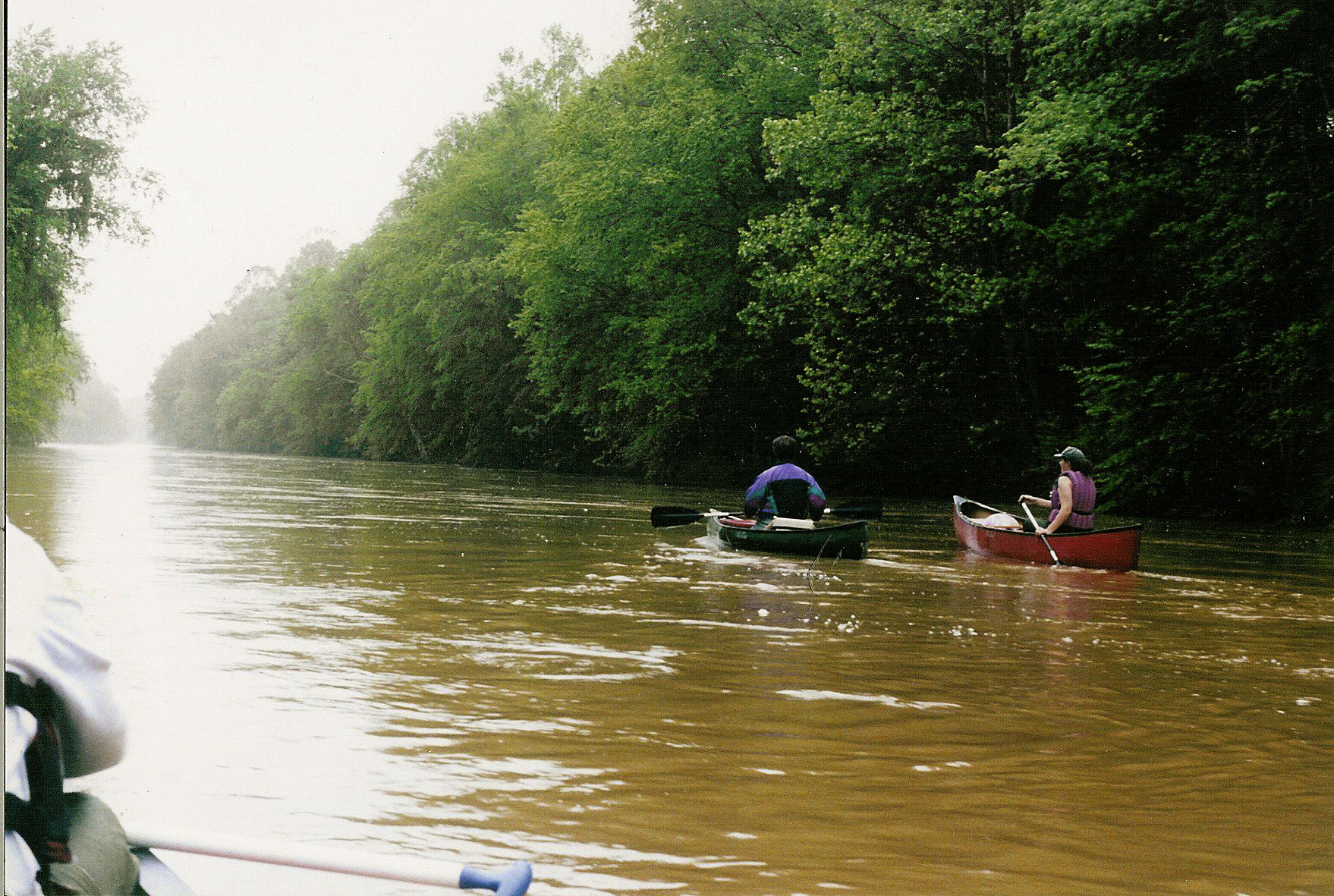
- Wolf River in Germantown

Location
- Country: United States

Physical characteristics
- Source
  - location: Baker's Pond, Holly Springs National Forest, near Walnut, Mississippi
  - coordinates: 34°56′36″N 89°01′55″W
  - elevation: 540 ft (160 m)
- Mouth
  - location: Mississippi River at Downtown Memphis, Tennessee
  - coordinates: 35°10′57″N 90°03′25″W
  - elevation: 210 ft (64 m)
- Length: 90 mi (140 km)
- Basin size: 889 sq mi (2,300 km^{2})
- Discharge
  - average: 1,327 cu ft/s (37.6 m^{3}/s)

The Wolf River is a 105-mile-long (169 km) alluvial river in western Tennessee and northern Mississippi, whose confluence with the Mississippi River was the site of various Chickasaw, French, Spanish and American communities that eventually became Memphis, Tennessee. It is estimated to be about 12,000 years old, formed by glacier runoff carving into the region's soft alluvial soil. It should not be confused with The Wolf River (Middle Tennessee) which flows primarily in Middle Tennessee and southern Kentucky. The Wolf River rises in the Holly Springs National Forest at Baker's Pond in Benton County, Mississippi, and flows northwest into Tennessee, before entering the Mississippi River north of downtown Memphis.

In 1985, the Wolf River Conservancy was formed in opposition to plans for additional channel dredging. In 1995 the "Ghost River" section of the Wolf was saved from timber auction by a coordinated effort of the Tennessee Wildlife Resources Agency, the Tennessee Department of Environment and Conservation, local conservation activists, and the Wolf River Conservancy. In 1997 the river was designated an American Heritage River by presidential proclamation under a special United States Environmental Protection Agency program. In that same year, musician Jeff Buckley accidentally drowned in the Wolf River while swimming in Memphis. In 2005 the Wolf River Restoration Project was commenced to stop rapid erosion at Collierville, Tennessee. The river serves to mitigate flooding and erosion, as habitat for wildlife, as a recreational area, as well as supplying clean water to an underground aquifer.

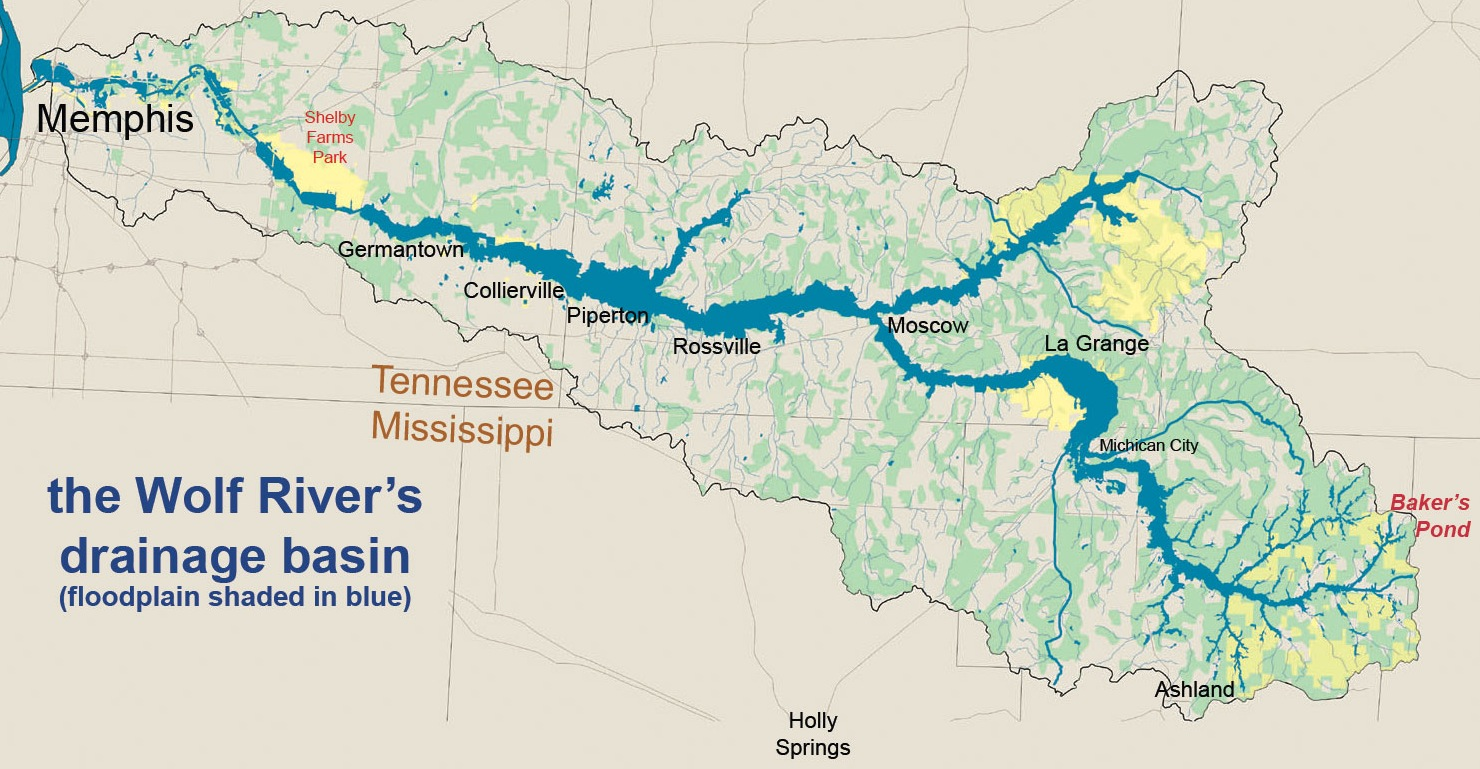
The Wolf River's watershed is 889 square miles (2,300 km^{2}) in surface area, including parts of Shelby and Fayette counties in Tennessee and Benton County, Mississippi.

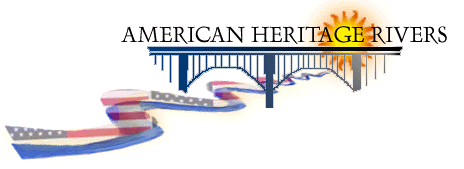
The Wolf River was designated an American Heritage River by presidential proclamation in 1997

== Hydrography ==
The Wolf River rises in the Holly Springs National Forest at Baker's Pond in Benton County, Mississippi, north of Ashland, and flows northwest into Tennessee, draining a large portion of Memphis and northern and eastern Shelby County, Tennessee, before entering the Mississippi River near the northern end of Mud Island, north of downtown Memphis.

=== Cities and towns ===
listed in downstream order from source to mouth

- Ashland, Mississippi
- Canaan, Mississippi
- Michigan City, Mississippi
- La Grange, Tennessee
- Moscow, Tennessee
- Rossville, Tennessee
- Piperton, Tennessee
- Collierville, Tennessee
- Germantown, Tennessee
- Bartlett, Tennessee
- Raleigh, a former seat of Shelby County, Tennessee, long since incorporated into Memphis.
- Memphis, Tennessee

== Wildlife ==
The Wolf River area is home to deer, otter, mink, bobcat, fox, coyote, wild turkey, and a wide variety of waterfowl, reptiles, amphibians, and aquatic life. Migrating osprey, great egret, and bald eagle have been spotted along this river as well.

There are Tennessee state record trees located in its bottomland forests, including a Tupelo Gum that is 17 feet (5.2 m) in circumference. Other hardwoods include green ash, red maple, swamp chestnut oak, blackgum, and the majestic bald cypress. Native flowering plants include cardinal flower, ironweed, swamp iris, false loosestrife, spatterdock, swamp rose, blue phlox and spring cress.

Twenty-five species of freshwater mussels (unionidae) have been documented. Their dependence on good water quality makes them vulnerable to pollution.

A growing number of these species of plants and animals can be found in the urban reaches of the Wolf in Memphis, as the legacy of community action and the Clean Water Act slowly heals the degraded downstream section.

On 27 March 2018, Tennessee Wildlife Resources Agency (TWRA) reported that its personnel had videoed a 7 ft (2.1 m) alligator at the Wolf River Wildlife Management Area in Fayette County, Tennessee, one in a series of confirmed recent sightings of the reptile in West Tennessee. The reptiles are moving into Tennessee across its southern state line; TWRA has not stocked alligators in Tennessee.

== History ==
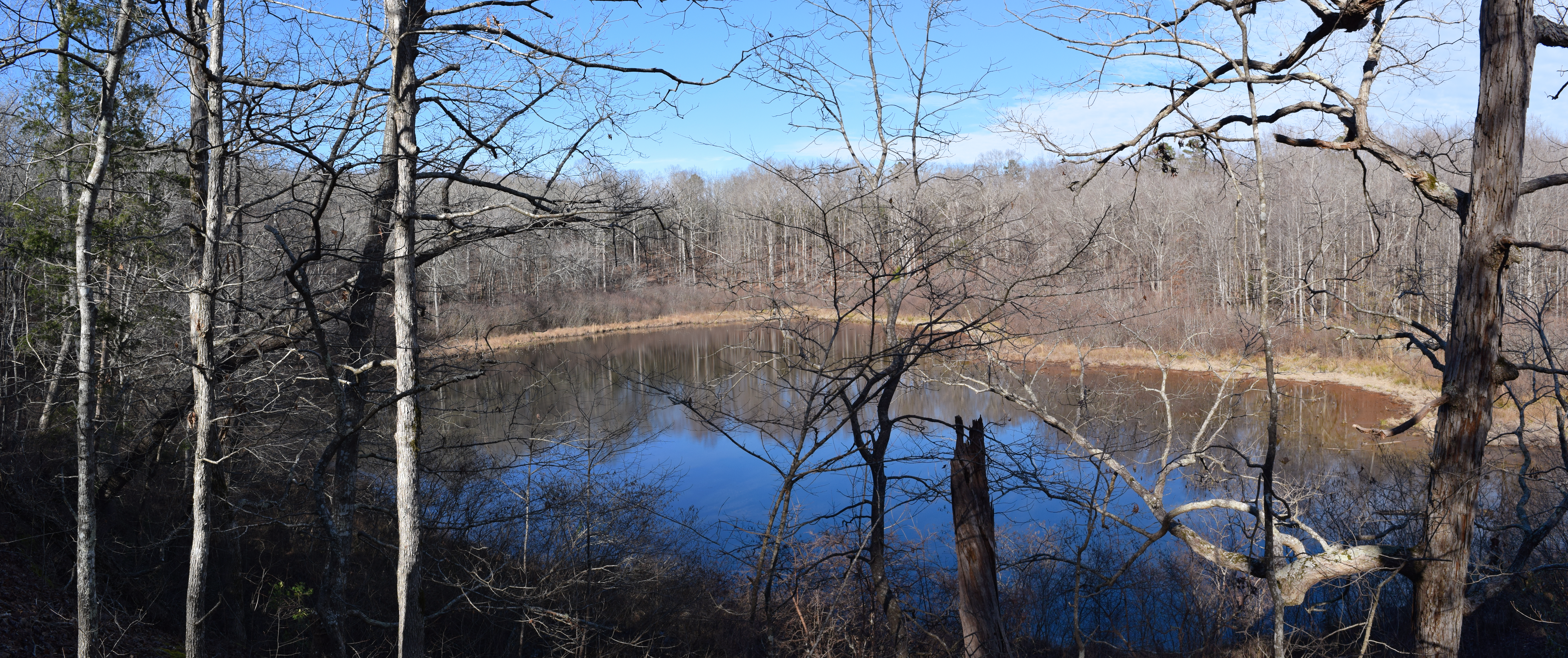
Baker's Pond, the source of the Wolf River in Mississippi

Wolf River is a 105-mile-long (169 km) alluvial stream in western Tennessee and northern Mississippi, whose confluence with the Mississippi River was the site of various Chickasaw, French, Spanish and American communities and forts that eventually became Memphis, Tennessee. The Wolf River is estimated to be about 12,000 years old, formed by glacier runoff carving the region's soft alluvial soil. It is one of many rivers in West Tennessee and Mississippi that prompted the Chickasaw to call the region "the land that leaks."

About 400 AD, a massive seismic event in the Ellendale Fault (part of the New Madrid Fault system) raised a low ridge across present-day east Memphis, diverting Nonconnah Creek away from the Wolf, causing it to flow directly into the Mississippi River several miles south of the Wolf's mouth. The lowermost section of the Nonconnah that continued to flow into the Wolf eventually became known as Cypress Creek.

The Mississippian culture thrived in this area until about the 16th century, as evidenced by mound sites and accounts by Hernando de Soto. Shortly afterwards, the Chickasaw nation settled northern Mississippi, western Tennessee, and eastern Arkansas.

In 1682, French explorer Robert Cavelier de La Salle claimed the region near the mouth of the Wolf River. The French alternately called the river Rivière de Mayot (or Margot), Blackbird River, and Rivière du Loup. The original Loup was rumored to be a Mahican Indian guide who disappeared along the river while guiding the French. The Mahicans were also known as Les Loups or "The Wolves." According to one account, both the English and Chickasaw afterwards called the river "Loup" in their respective languages: "Wolf" and "Nashoba."

During a multi-river voyage from Chicago, Illinois, to Biloxi, Mississippi, Jesuit priest Jacques Gravier made the following journal entry for 26 October 1700, after reaching the mouth of the Wolf:

We passed the Riviere a Mayot [Wolf] on the south, from the name of a savage of the Mahican nation who was of Mr. de la Salle's party. This river does not seem to be very large, but is said to be a good hunting ground, and that the Chickacha come to its mouth, from which they are only three days‚ journey, cutting south inland.

Concerned about American activities in their territory along the east bank of the Mississippi River, the Spanish colonial government erected Fort San Fernando de las Barrancas in 1795 near the Chickasaw Bluffs at the mouth of the Wolf River. The fort was dismantled in 1797 in accordance with Pinckney's Treaty.

Spanish documents referred to the river as Las Casas.

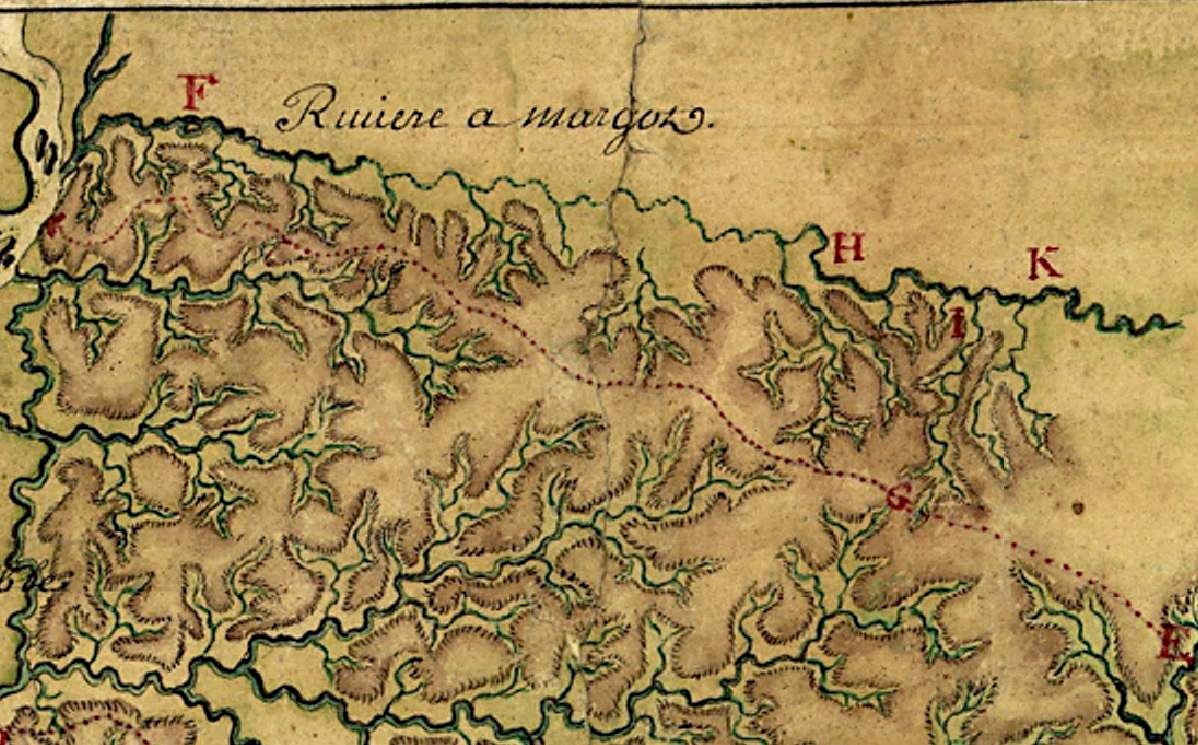
The Wolf River's watershed (everything above the red dotted line), as surveyed in 1740 by Ignace Francois Broutin, chief engineer of French Louisiana. The French had named the Wolf "Riviere a Margot"

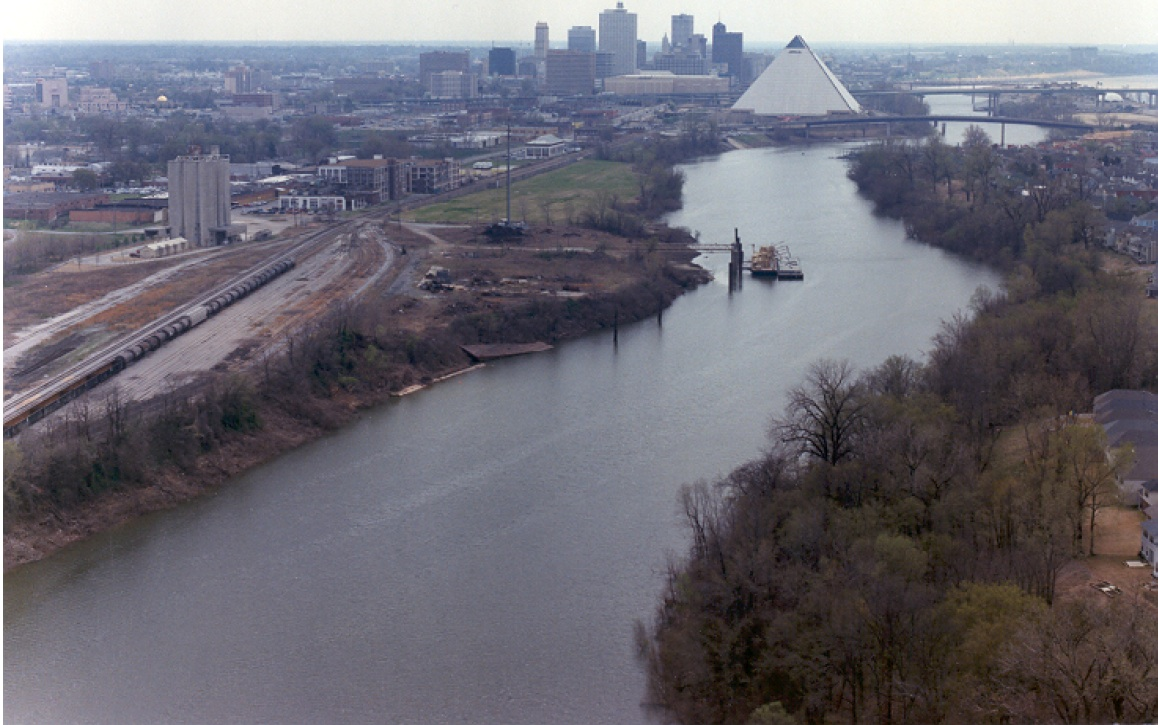
Wolf River Harbor, at Downtown Memphis, was formerly the lowermost channel of the Wolf River before its 1960 diversion by the U.S. Army Corps of Engineers. The old mouth of the Wolf River is visible in the upper-right corner, framed by the I-40 and Mud Island Monorail bridges.

In the early 19th century, the Wolf River was declared navigable, from Memphis to La Grange, by the Tennessee General Assembly, which appropriated funds to remove obstructions for keel boat travel. In 1888, Memphis stopped using the Wolf River as its principal source of drinking water, switching to artesian wells, which are still used and which are replenished by the Wolf's watershed.

Because of its foul odor, the Wolf was dammed in 1960 near its mouth and diverted into the Mississippi north of Mud Island. The section of the Wolf downstream of this channel diversion became a slackwater harbor of the Mississippi known today as Wolf River Harbor, which separates Mud Island (actually a peninsula) from the Memphis "mainland." Completion of channelization of the Wolf from the Mississippi upstream to Gray's Creek, east of Germantown, Tennessee, resulted in a lowered riverbed and diminished wetland habitat. In 1970, surface drainage, sewage, and industrial pollution caused a group of scientists and environmentalists to pronounce the river "dead" around Memphis.

In 1977 Mary Winslow Chapman published I Remember Raleigh, which included vivid descriptions of a pre-channelized Wolf River.

To form any picture of [the river's environs] we must forget what we now see and imagine the Wolf as it was then, a clear, spring-fed stream slipping silently along through the endless forest, where the unbroken shade shielded it from the fierce Southern sunshine and kept it flowing fresh and cool all summer long ...

The water was fresh and sweet, flowing out of the uncontaminated woods, but gradually this condition changed. As more and more land upstream was cultivated, more silt was washed into the river. After each rain it took longer for the stream to clear, and finally, with the establishment of the Penal Farm [today's Shelby Farms] with all its disagreeable effluvia, swimming became impossible.

Gone now forever from this spot are the cane brake and the horses; the tall timber and the mysterious river, where hard by, on Austin Peay Bridge auto traffic streams triumphant, night and day in one unceasing roar, all oblivious of the life and history buried down below.

In 1985, the Wolf River Conservancy was founded by an alliance of conservation-minded real estate executives and local environmental advocates, united in opposition to plans for additional channel dredging. In 1995 the "Ghost River" section of the Wolf was saved from timber auction by a coordinated effort of the Tennessee Wildlife Resources Agency, the Tennessee Department of Environment and Conservation, local conservation activists Lucius Burch and W.S. "Babe" Howard, and the Wolf River Conservancy. The Ghost River section is located at: 35.03000°N 89.29670°W.

In 1997 the river was designated an American Heritage River by presidential proclamation under a special United States Environmental Protection Agency program. In that same year musician Jeff Buckley accidentally drowned in the Wolf River while swimming in Memphis.

In 2005 the Wolf River Restoration Project was commenced by the U.S. Army Corps of Engineers, Memphis Office to stop rapid erosion known as "headcutting" at Collierville, Tennessee.

In 2007 the "Middle Wolf" Campaign attempted sprawl-proofing of the western Fayette County section. Completion of the Collierville-Arlington Parkway segment of Tenn-385 and I-269 outer loop expressway, including two (and potentially five) interchanges poised to become major drivers of suburban growth into forested sections of the Wolf River's floodplain and the surface-exposed sections of the Memphis Sands aquifer.

== Identified public benefits ==
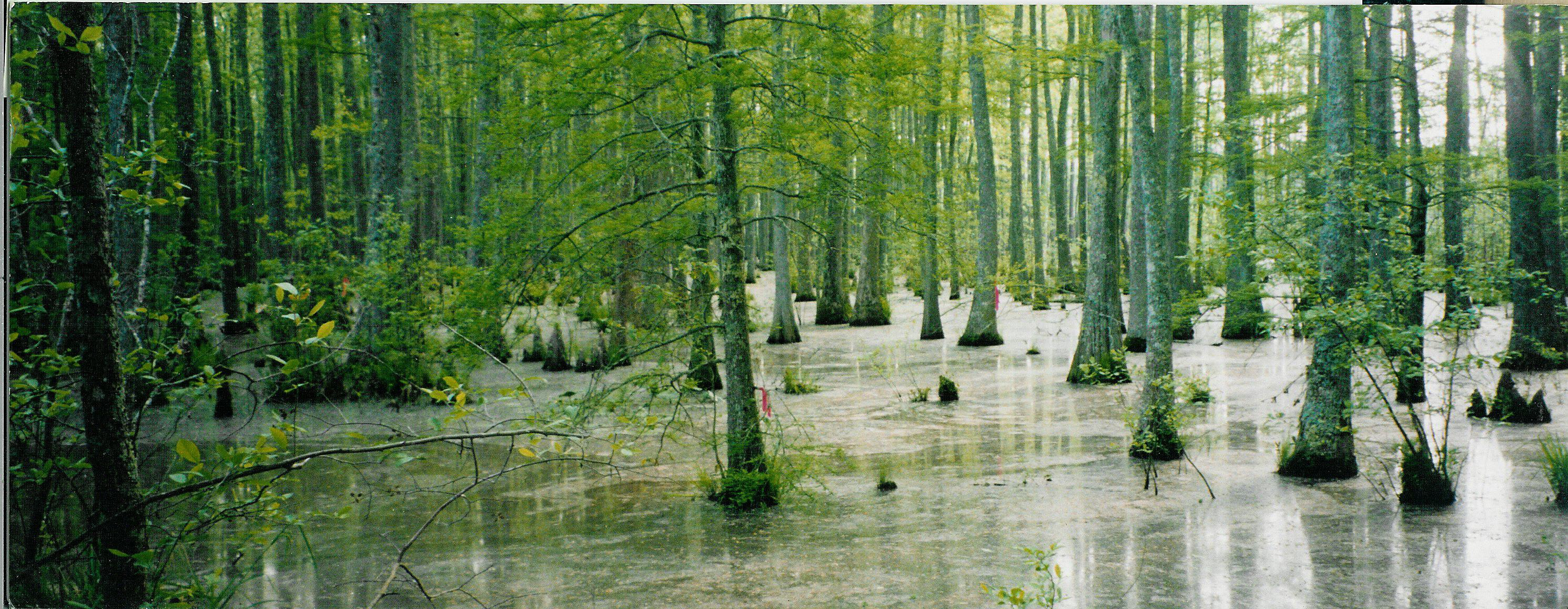
Bottomland hardwood swamp at the confluence of Tubby Creek and the Wolf River in the Holly Springs National Forest near Ashland, Mississippi. This location was considered to be the Wolf's head of navigation at the time of the first known full descent of the river, completed in 1998 by members of the Wolf River Conservancy who hiked or waded from the river's source at Baker's Pond to this point and traveled by canoe to the river's confluence with the Mississippi River.

According to the Wolf River Conservancy, the Wolf River serves the Mid-South in four distinct ways:

- Flood/Erosion Control: During heavy rains, the Wolf's floodplain and wetlands temporarily store floodwaters. When these are filled in for development, the river loses these natural release valves, causing increases in river velocity and flood height. Without an adequate floodplain, floodwaters and the erosion caused by them threaten property, transportation, and lives.
- Water Quality: The Memphis metropolitan area and other Mid-South communities receive drinking water from a pure underground aquifer beneath the Wolf River Basin. The Wolf's fragile wetlands hold water long enough for it to be absorbed into the ground and serve as natural filters to cleanse polluted waters before they reach the aquifer.
- Wildlife Habitat: The Wolf River supports a variety of animals and waterfowl. Migrating osprey, great egret, and bald eagle have been spotted along the river as well.
- Low-Impact Recreation: While civilization has long surrounded the Wolf River's floodplain, its wetland and bottomland trails provide Mid-Southerners with scenic wilderness experiences from the Holly Springs National Forest all the way to downtown Memphis. Hikers, runners, sportsmen, cyclists and paddlers experience nature on or near the river every day.

== See also ==
- List of Mississippi rivers
- List of Tennessee rivers
- Wolf River Conservancy
- Mississippi River tributaries
