= Bill Morris (Tennessee politician) =

American politician (1932–2025)

Sheriff of Shelby County
- In office 1964–1970

Personal details
- Born: William Noel Morris; September 29, 1932 Fulton, Mississippi, U.S.
- Died: July 25, 2025 (aged 92) Memphis, Tennessee, U.S.

William Noel Morris (September 29, 1932 – July 25, 2025) was an American politician in Tennessee who served as mayor of Shelby County, including the city of Memphis. He also was a sheriff of the Shelby County Sheriff's Office. He was the president of the Tennessee County Services Association, an organization of county officials.

== Life and career ==
Morris was born on September 29, 1932. A friend of Elvis Presley, he served as the sheriff of Shelby County from 1964 to 1970. During his tenure as sheriff, Morris was in charge of the custody of assassin James Earl Ray. While in custody Ray admitted to the 1968 murder of civil rights leader Martin Luther King Jr. However, Ray later claimed he had been coerced into pleading guilty.

Morris was Mayor of Shelby County from 1978 to 1994. Morris was instrumental, along with park superintendent Tom Hill, in introducing a herd of bison to Shelby Farms.

In 1994, Morris campaigned for the Democratic nomination for Governor of Tennessee, placing second in the race to Phil Bredesen.

Tennessee State Route 385 in Shelby County, which was originally known as Nonconnah Parkway, was renamed as Bill Morris Parkway.

Morris died on July 25, 2025, at the age of 92.
