= American Heritage Rivers Protection Program =

The American Heritage Rivers Protection Program was authorized by Executive Order 13061 during the Clinton Administration on September 11, 1997. The initiative was to support existing community-based efforts to preserve, protect, and restore rivers and their communities. It was considered an avenue to deliver federal resources more efficiently and effectively in support of voluntary community efforts at enhancing and protecting rivers or river segments.

The initial selection criteria were developed under the Chair of the Council on Environmental Quality to reflect the wide variety of viewpoints concerning riverine and natural resource utilization, including those representing natural, cultural, and historic resources; scenic, environmental, and recreation interests; tourism, transportation, and economic development interests; and industries such as agriculture, hydropower, manufacturing, mining, and forest management.

The designated American Heritage Rivers were selected based on proposals submitted by local sponsors. The designations are located in or affect pristine lands, agricultural lands and urban environments
