= Chubby Creek (Wolf River tributary) =

Stream in Mississippi, U.S.

Coordinates: 34.9778688°N 89.2536811°W

Chubby Creek is a stream in the U.S. state of Mississippi. It is a tributary to the Wolf River.

Chubby Creek is a name derived from the Choctaw language, and several attempts have been made to explain its meaning.
