= Roy Harrover =

American architect

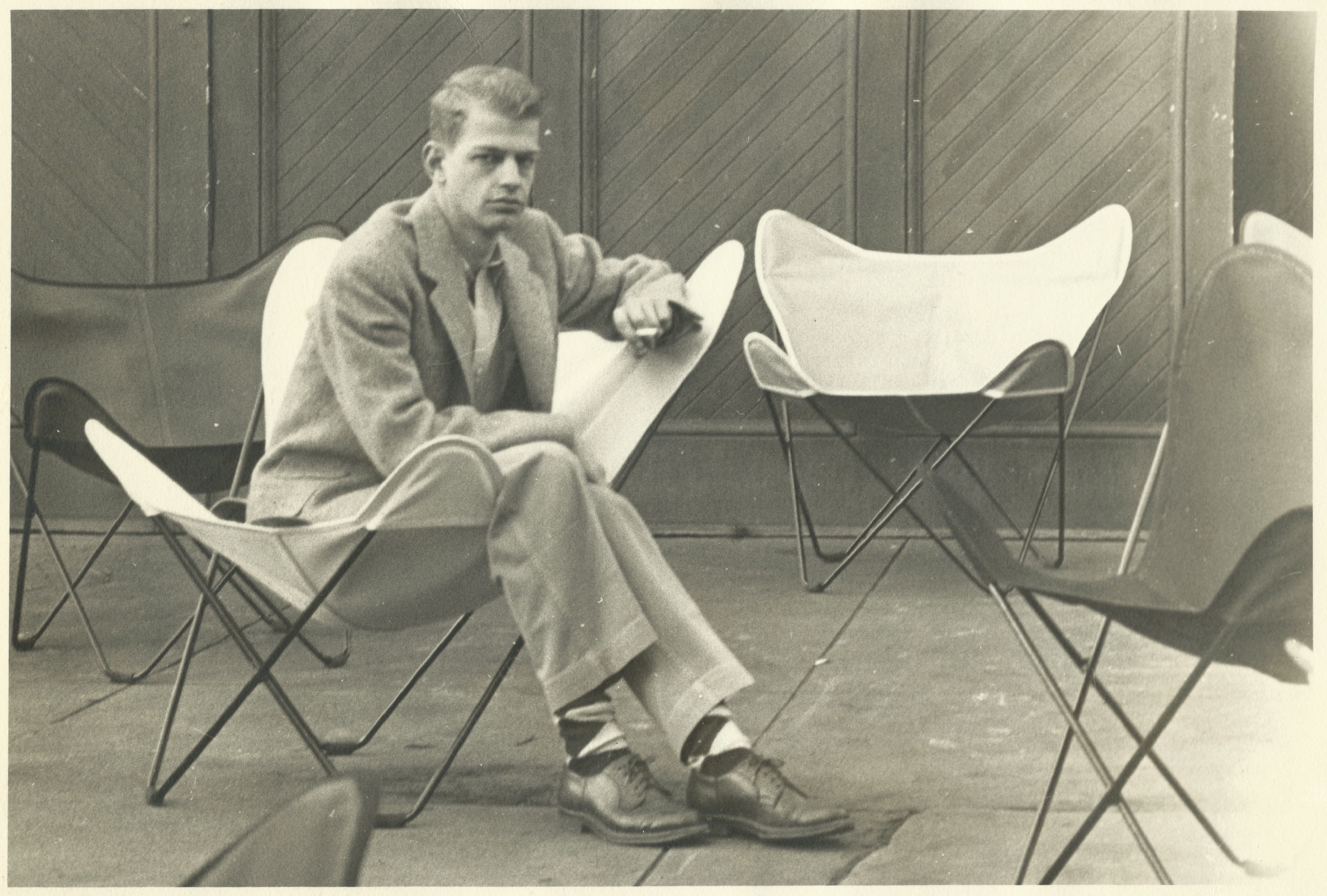
- Harrover at Yale in 1953
- Born: November 23, 1928; Dayton, Ohio
- Died: December 13, 2016 (aged 88); Memphis, Tennessee
- Education: Yale School of Architecture (M.Arch, 1953)
- Occupation: Architect
- Awards: Progressive Architecture Award; National Design Merit, AIA; Time Magazine, Best of 1983; U.S. Navy National Design Award
- Practice: Mann & Harrover; Roy P. Harrover & Associates

Roy Perkins Harrover, FAIA (November 23, 1928 – December 13, 2016) was an American architect who designed the Memphis International Airport as well as numerous civic buildings across the southern United States. His designs range in style from New Formalist to Brutalist and are characterized by their strictly linear forms. He is largely credited with having established a modern architectural identity for Memphis, Tennessee.

== Early life ==
Born in Dayton, Ohio on November 23, 1928, Harrover moved with his mother to Nashville at age two following his parents' divorce. At age 14, Harrover was hired by Vultee Aircraft to construct accurate models of their airplanes. He served in the U.S. Marine Corps from 1946 to 1948, then attended Yale University on the G.I. Bill, studying under Vincent Scully, King-lui Wu, Louis Kahn and visiting critics Buckminster Fuller and Philip Johnson. In 1953, Harrover graduated first in his class.

== Architecture ==
Following graduation, Harrover worked briefly as chief designer under Paul Schweikher. In 1955, he moved to Memphis and established the architectural firm Mann & Harrover with partner William Mann. They won a design competition in 1959, judged by Philip Johnson and Paul Rudolph, for the new Memphis Art Academy (now known as the Memphis College of Art).

Mann died of lung cancer a year before Harrover finished designing the Memphis International Airport. It was unveiled in 1963 and was among the first airports to make use of jetways and a two-level system. It is particularly noted for its distinctive martini glass-shaped columns. Once all projects involving Mann were completed, Harrover renamed the firm Roy P. Harrover & Associates.

In the late 1970s, Mayor J. Wyeth Chandler commissioned Harrover to repurpose a defunct sandbar in the Mississippi River as a means of revitalizing downtown Memphis. Dredges were deployed to raise the sandbar above flood level, upon which Harrover designed the Mud Island River Park: an entertainment complex featuring a museum of the Mississippi River, an amphitheater, shops and restaurants, as well as the "Riverwalk": a water-filled, scale-model promenade depicting the lower Mississippi River between Cairo, Illinois to New Orleans. Harrover also designed the Memphis Suspension Railway which allowed visitors to access the park from downtown, negotiating its constructing between Swiss engineers and Italian workers.

Harrover was awarded honorary Doctorates in Fine Arts by Rhodes College and the Memphis College of Art. He closed his firm in 1994 and began full-time consulting work.

== Notable works ==
- Memphis International Airport (1963)
- Mud Island (1982)
- Memphis College of Art (1959)
- One Commerce Square (1973)
- Church of the River (First Unitarian Church of Memphis). (1965)
- U.S. Embassy in Lagos, Nigeria
- Weintraub Residence Addition (1990)
