= American Heritage Rivers =

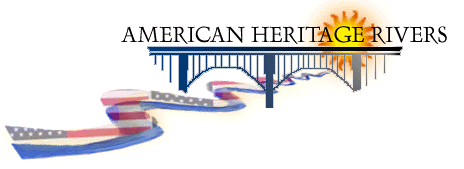
Logo

American Heritage Rivers were designated by the United States Environmental Protection Agency in the 1990s to receive special attention (coordinating efforts of multiple governmental entities) to further three objectives: natural resource and environmental protection, economic revitalization, and historic and cultural preservation.

== Establishment ==
The American Heritage Rivers Protection Program was created by an Executive Order, Number 13061, signed by President Bill Clinton on September 11, 1997. Selection criteria were developed under the Chair of the Council on Environmental Quality (CEQ), with wide government and expert involvement, and reflected a wide variety of viewpoints, including those representing natural, cultural, and historic resources; scenic, environmental, and recreation interests; tourism, transportation, and economic development interests; and industries such as agriculture, hydropower, manufacturing, mining, and forest management. The recommended rivers were to represent a variety of stream sizes, diverse geographical locations, and a wide range of settings from urban to rural and ensure that relatively pristine, successful revitalization efforts were considered, as well as degraded rivers in need of restoration.

== Criteria for designation ==
Rivers were selected for designation according to the following criteria:

- The characteristics of the natural, economic, agricultural, scenic, historic, cultural, or recreational resources of the river that render it distinctive or unique;
- The effectiveness with which the community has defined its plan of action and the extent to which the plan addresses, either through planned actions or past accomplishments, all three American Heritage Rivers objectives;
- The strength and diversity of community support for the nomination as evidenced by letters from elected officials; landowners; private citizens; businesses; and especially State, local, and tribal governments. Broad community support is essential to receiving the American Heritage River designation; and
- Willingness and capability of the community to forge partnerships and agreements to implement their plan to meet their goals and objectives.

== Designated rivers ==
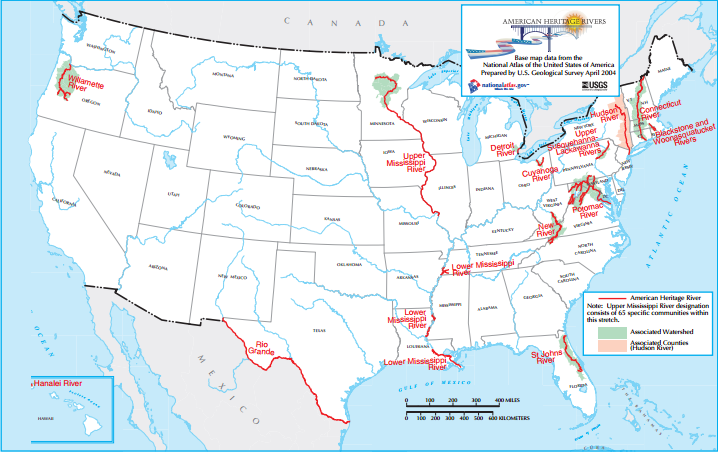
Map of the rivers

President Clinton designated the 14 rivers (or river systems) on July 30, 1998.

- Blackstone and Woonasquatucket Rivers (MA, RI)
- Connecticut River (NH, VT, MA, CT)
- Cuyahoga River (OH)
- Detroit River (MI, ON)
- Hanalei River (HI)
- Hudson River (NY, NJ)
- Lower Mississippi River (MS, LA, TN, AR)
  - Wolf River in metropolitan Memphis is bundled with the Lower Mississippi.
- Potomac River (DC, MD, VA, WV)
- New River (NC, VA, WV)
- Rio Grande (CO, NM, TX)
- St. Johns River (FL)
- Upper Mississippi River (IA, IL, MN, MO, WI)
- Upper Susquehanna and Lackawanna Rivers (PA)
- Willamette River (OR)

== See also ==
- Canadian Heritage Rivers System, Canada's counterpart to the American Heritage Rivers
