= West Tennessee Historical Society =

- Abbreviation: WTHS
- Predecessor: Memphis Historical Society
- Formation: 1935
- Purpose: To "support historical programs, archives, publications, preservation, markers, museums, and other historical collections" relevant to West Tennessee.
- Headquarters: Memphis, Tennessee
- Board President: Michael Freeman
- Executive Director: Carol Perel
- Website: wths-tn.org

The West Tennessee Historical Society (WTHS) is a nonprofit historical society servicing the twenty-one counties that comprise West Tennessee.

Headquartered in Memphis, the society was officially founded in 1935, but traces its roots to a series of preceding historical societies in the West Tennessee area, the oldest of which was founded in 1857. The society is involved in the publication of several books about West Tennessee history, as well as a peer-reviewed journal known as the West Tennessee Historical Society Papers, released annually. The society is also involved in the preservation of historic landmark structures in the West Tennessee area and in maintaining an archive of West Tennessee history-related historical documents and books at the University of Memphis.

== History ==
The West Tennessee Historical Society traces its history back to the Old Folks of Shelby County, a historical society founded in 1857. The Old Folks of Shelby County later became part of the Confederate Relief and Historical Association, which was founded in 1866 and reorganized twice, first into the Confederate Historical Association in 1869 and then into Camp 28 in 1884. The Memphis Historical Society succeeded Camp 28 in 1900, which expanded its scope from the history of the city of Memphis to the history of the entirety of West Tennessee in 1935, with Dr. Marshall Wingfield becoming the first President of the West Tennessee Historical Society. The first edition of the society's annual, peer-reviewed journal, the West Tennessee Historical Society Papers, was published in 1947, and the society incorporated in 1950. In 1974, the society's archive of historic documents and books relating to West Tennessee history was moved from the Pink Palace Museum and Planetarium to the Special Collections Department of the University of Memphis. The society's role in protecting landmark structures in West Tennessee began in 1989, when it played a critical role in saving the historic John Gray House in Germantown from demolition. The society also intervened to save the Mississippi River Museum on Mud Island in 1990.

== Services ==
In addition to its annual journal, the West Tennessee Historical Society Papers, the society has also been involved in the publication of several books about West Tennessee history. The society also puts out a monthly newsletter.

The society annually hands out an award to "an individual or organization for outstanding contribution to West Tennessee history."

The society maintains a list of historical markers of Shelby County.

== See also ==
- List of historical societies in Tennessee
