= Chubby Creek (Gum Creek tributary) =

Stream in Mississippi, U.S.

Coordinates: 34.3695447°N 88.2464327°W

Chubby Creek is a stream in the U.S. state of Mississippi. It is a tributary to Gum Creek.

"Chubby" may be derived from the name of a Choctaw chief.
