= Wolf River Conservancy =

Nonprofit organization in the U.S.

Wolf River Conservancy (WRC)
- Formation: 1985; 41 years ago
- Type: water conservation advocacy group and land trust
- Tax ID no.: 62-1245975
- Headquarters: Memphis, Tennessee, United States
- Region served: Serves the Wolf River Watershed area, including Shelby, Fayette, and Hardeman counties in Tennessee and Benton County, Mississippi.
- Members: 1,500 members
- Website: www.wolfriver.org

The Wolf River Conservancy (WRC) is a non-profit conservation land trust based in Memphis, Tennessee. Its stated purpose is "conserving and enhancing the Wolf River and its environs as a natural resource for public education and low-impact recreational activities." The conservancy has approximately 1,500 members from throughout West Tennessee, led by an active Board of Directors and staff and advised by the Wolf River Conservancy Trustees. It is a fully accredited member of the Land Trust Alliance.

== Mission ==
The Wolf River Conservancy is dedicated to the protection and enhancement of the Wolf River and its watershed as a sustainable natural resource.

== History ==
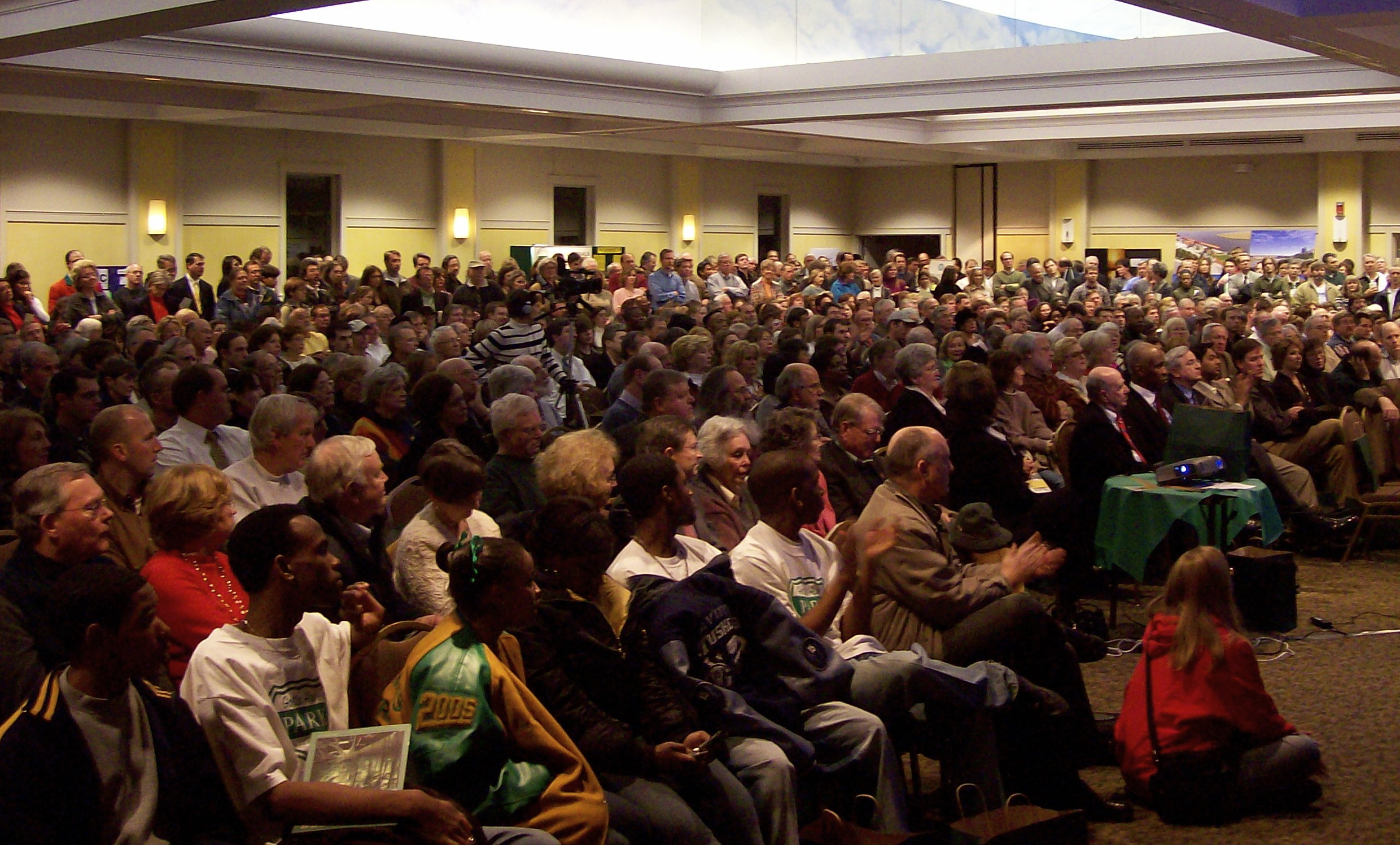
Members of the Wolf River Conservancy, the Shelby Farms Park Alliance, and Greater Memphis Greenline gather for the 2007 Greening Greater Memphis summit, along with local elected officials.

The WRC was formed in 1985 by a small group of people concerned about a new dredging and infill project on the Wolf River in Memphis. They had witnessed the effects of similar development-related degradation along nearby Nonconnah Creek. That small group has grown to include more than members from every community along the river. For ten years the group's emphasis was in advocacy and education—commenting on wetland destruction or encouraging activities on the river during Wolf River Days.

In 1995, WRC become a land trust organization after purchasing the Ghost River section of the Wolf near La Grange, Tennessee. The Tennessee Department of Environment and Conservation, the Tennessee Wildlife Resources Agency, and local conservationists W.S. "Babe" Howard and Lucius Burch merged their collective resources to save a 4,000-acre (16 km^{2}) section of the river from a land and timber company auction. This area was ultimately brought into public ownership as the Wolf River Wildlife Management Area and the Ghost River State Natural Area.

With a dramatic increase in concern for the Wolf River by an increasingly more environmentally sensitive public, the Wolf River Conservancy continues to advance in new arenas, like the City of Memphis' Wolf River Greenway Master Plan, the Army Corps of Engineers/Shelby County Wolf River Restoration project in Collierville, recreational facilities at the river's source in the Holly Springs National Forest, as well as continued efforts to conserve and enhance the river's bottomland forests in Fayette and Benton counties.

== Wolf River Greenway ==
The Wolf River Greenway is a 26-mile multi-use path being constructed alongside the Wolf River through Memphis from Mud Island to Germantown. It connects to Greenbelt Park, Germantown Greenway, Shelby Farms, and the Shelby Farms Greenline. It is planned to connect to the future Heights Line and Chelsea Greenline.

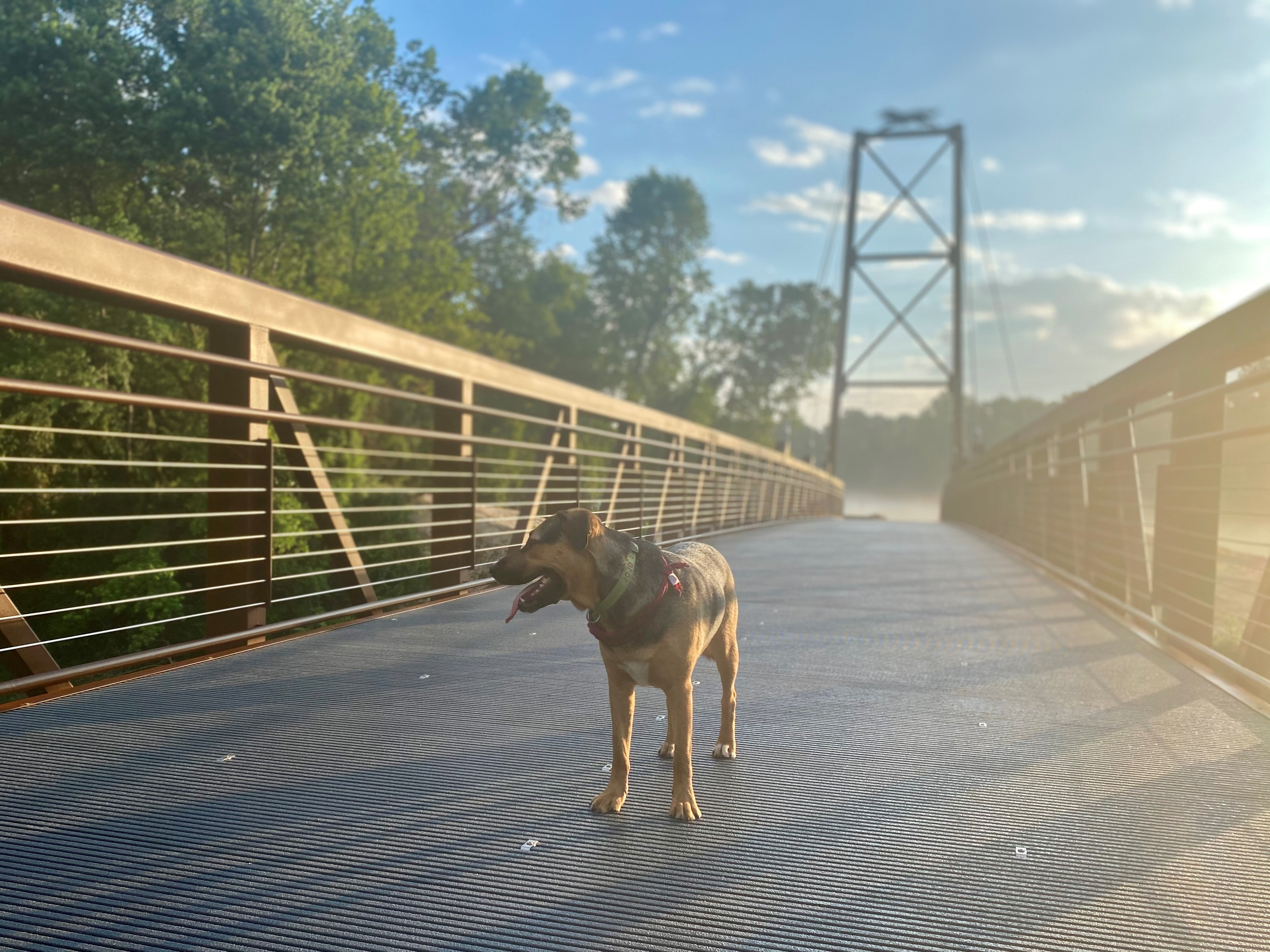
Wolf Crossing bridge, built in 2021

As of early 2023, the completed sections are:

- Mud Island (Mud Island to Second St): The Mud Island section opened to the public in October 2017. This portion of the Greenway features a 1.2 mile loop along the old Wolf River Levee built to divert the flow of the Wolf River in 1960.
- North McLean Cycle Track (McLean: Chelsea to Nedra and McLean: Nedra to Rodney Baber Park): Built atop a levee, the Hollywood section and McLean Cycle track compose 3.3 miles of the Wolf River Greenway trail through the Hyde Park neighborhood of Memphis.
- Hyde Park (McLean to Hollywood): The Hollywood section features a trailhead parking area along N Hollywood Street and connects to the McLean Cycle Track to the west.
- N Highland to Epping Way
- Epping Way: The Epping Way section of the Wolf River Greenway Trail system can be found on 138 acres of riverfront property, owned by the Wolf River Conservancy. This section of the Greenway features a 20-acre lake, 1.2 miles of pedestrian trails with two bridges.
- Kennedy Park: The Kennedy Park section of the Wolf River Greenway opened in 2018 and features 1.5 miles of recreational trails.
- East Section (Walnut Grove to Shady Grove, to City of Germantown): The East Section of the Wolf River Greenway consists of 3.6 miles of paved trail.
- Wolf Crossing: The Wolf Crossing section opened in 2021 connecting Shelby Farms Greenline and the Wolf River Greenway Trail further. This section contains a 270-foot bridge over the Wolf River, and a raised concrete boardwalk through Lucius Burch State Natural Area.

== See also ==
- Wetlands
- Overton Park
