= Swamp iris =

Swamp iris is a common name for several plants and may refer to:

- Patersonia fragilis, also known as short purple-flag, native to southeastern Australia
- Iris ser. Hexagonae, a group of Iris species native to North America, also known as "Louisiana iris"
