= Mud Island, Memphis =

Small peninsula in Memphis, Tennessee, US

Coordinates: 35.146°N 90.058°W

Mud Island
- Landform and Neighborhood of Memphis
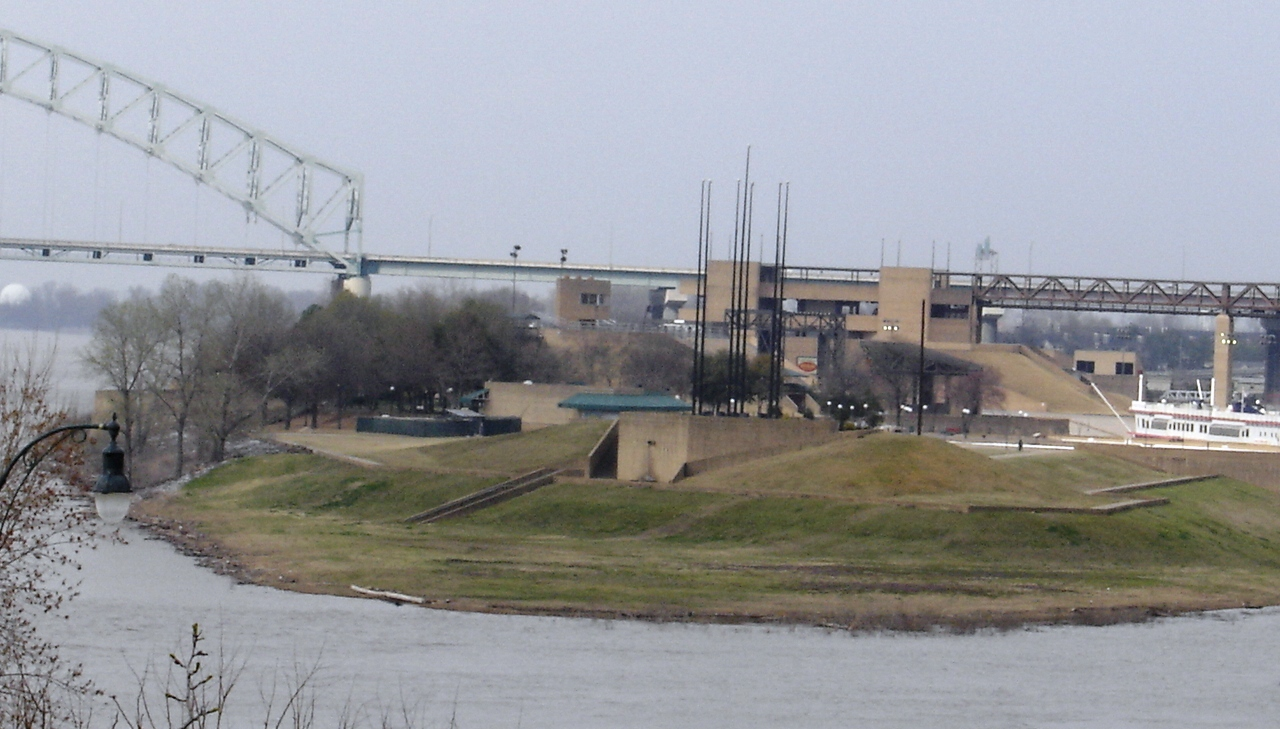
- Mud Island River Park
- Interactive map of Mud Island
- Country: United States
- State: Tennessee
- County: Shelby County
- City: Memphis
- Neighborhoods: List: Harbor Town
- ZIP Code: 38103

Mud Island is a peninsula in Memphis, Tennessee. It is bordered by the Mississippi River to the west, the Wolf River to the north, and Wolf River Harbor to the east. The peninsula contains Mud Island River Park and the Harbor Town residential neighborhood. The park is managed and operated by the Memphis River Parks Partnership.

Harbor Town includes mansions, single-family homes, and apartment complexes. The total population of Harbor Town is 14,648. Harbor Town offers various trails and ponds, as well as a shopping district and a private school.

== History ==
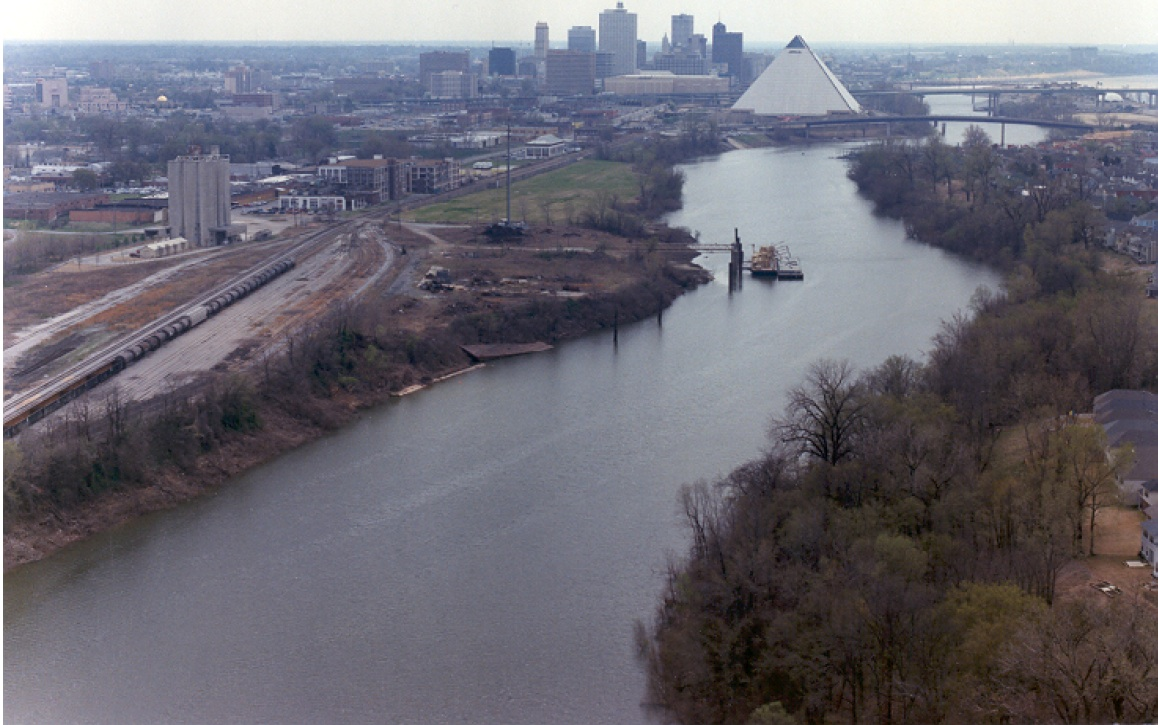
Wolf River Harbor in 2006

Mud Island was formed by a buildup of silt, gravel, and sand by 1899. It was originally referred to as City Island until the 1950s. Mud Island became the location of the Memphis Downtown Airport in 1959 and was used primarily by wealthy businessmen to access Downtown Memphis. In 1960, the Wolf River Levee was used to divert the flow of the Wolf River. The airport was shut down in 1970 due to the construction of the Hernando de Soto Bridge. In 1976, Roy Harrover, the architect responsible for the Memphis International Airport and Memphis College of Art, came up with a project to turn 50 acres (20 hectares) of property owned by the city into a destination designed to attract locals and tourists alike. The proposed name for the park was Volunteer Park, but it was later named Mud Island Park when it was opened on July 4, 1982.

The park has been run Riverfront Development Corporation (RDC) since 2000.

== Attractions ==
=== Mud Island River Park ===
Mud Island River Park, opened in 1982, is on the south end of the peninsula. It includes bike trails, paddleboats, and kayaks, and the Riverwalk, a hydraulic scale model of the lower Mississippi River from Cairo, Illinois to New Orleans.The cement model is 2,000 feet (610 m) long and includes plaques with details about the river's history throughout.

The Mississippi River Museum was on Mud Island from 1982 to 2019. It included 18 galleries and exhibits and presented the history of the lower Mississippi River Valley over the span of the last 10,000 years. The museum also displayed over 5,000 artifacts.

The Mud Island Amphitheater is a concrete outdoor amphitheater that seats up to 5,000 people. The structure has been used for concerts and shows since it was built in 1982 but has gone unused since 2018. The city of Memphis is putting $4 million towards renovations on the amphitheater so it can be used as a concert venue again. Artists that have performed there include Bob Dylan, Journey, Eric Clapton, and Peter Frampton.

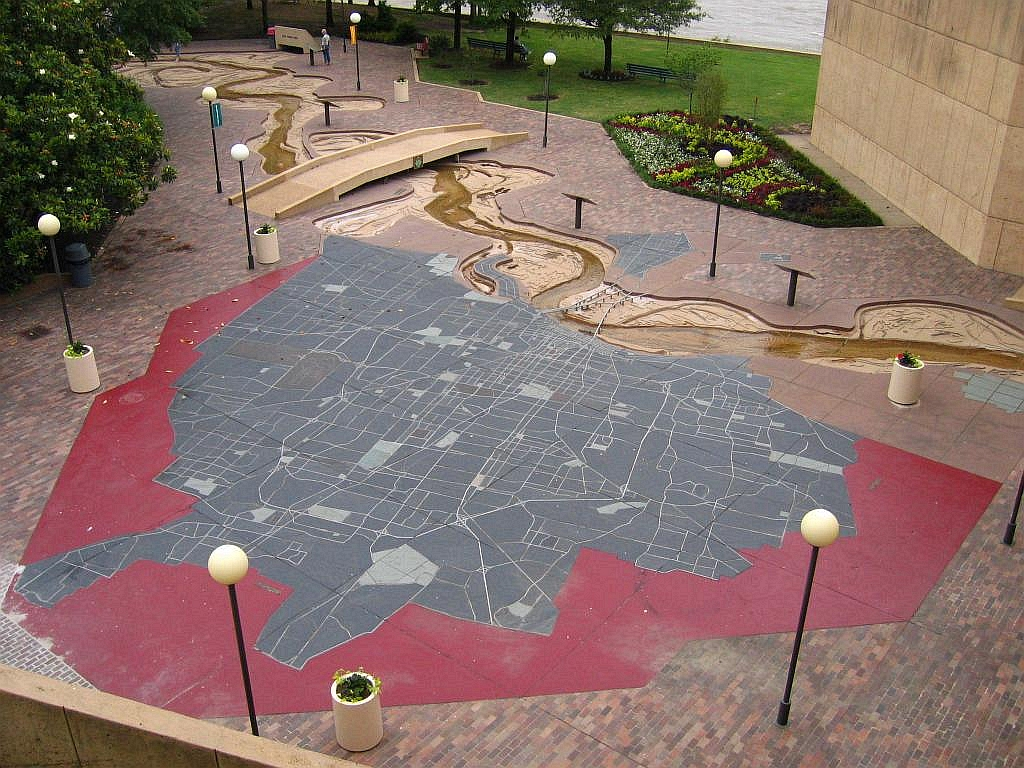
Map of Memphis in the Mississippi River Park

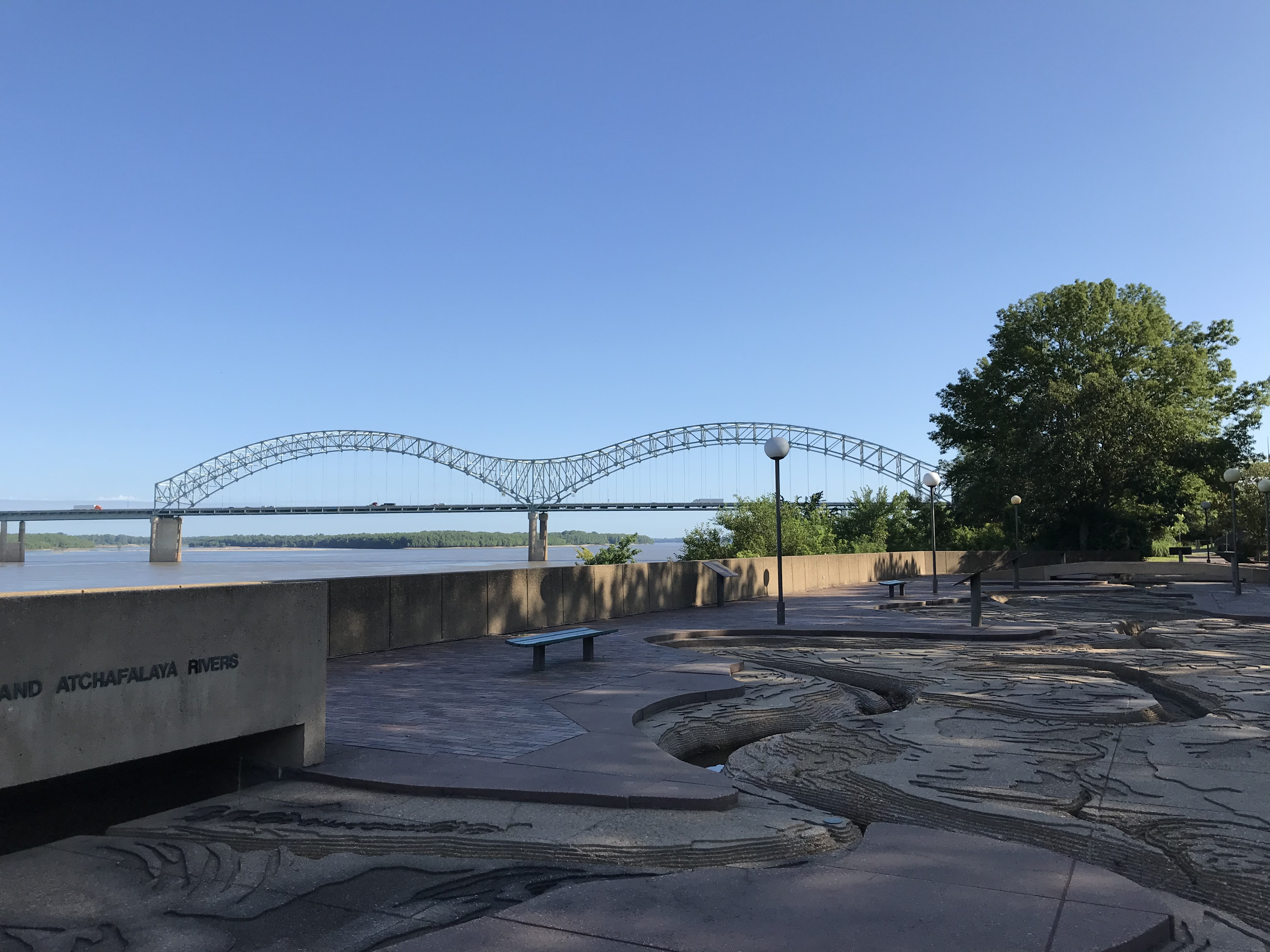
Hydraulic scale model of Mississippi

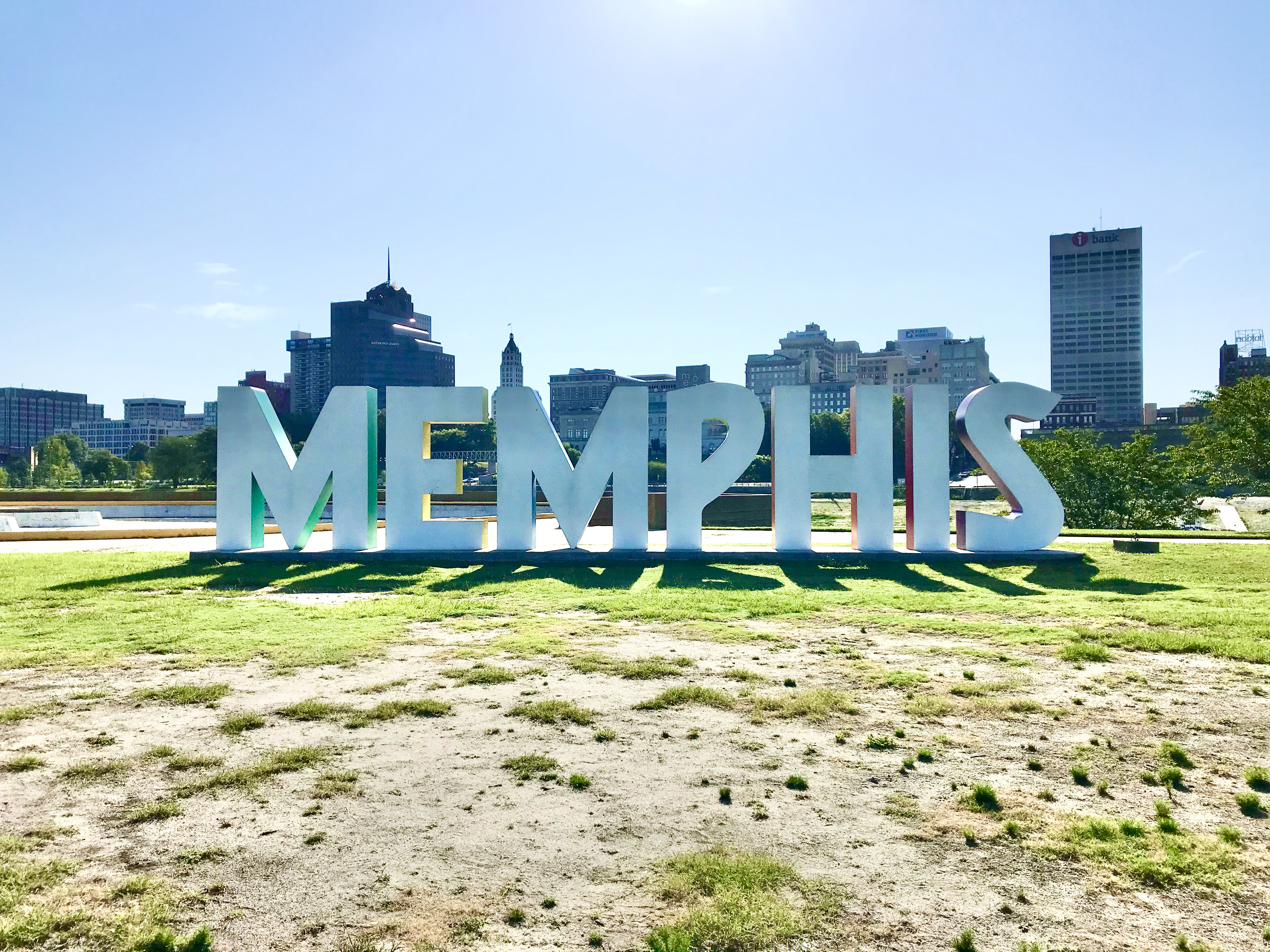
Memphis sign

=== Other attractions ===
Harbor Town and Downtown (background) from the Mississippi River Park (2014)

A section of the Wolf River Greenway on Mud Island that provides a trail for walking, running, or biking. It connects to the Greenbelt Park.

The River Inn of Harbor Town also offers three restaurants – Paulette's Restaurant, Tug's Casual Grill, and Terrace at the River Inn. The main grocery store on Mud Island is Cordelia's Market.

== See also ==
- The Firm (1993 film)—Mud Island is the setting for the climactic chase
- List of contemporary amphitheatres
- Mississippi River Basin Model—large-scale hydraulic model of the Mississippi River located in Clinton, Mississippi
- Memphis Suspension Railway—former monorail connecting Mud Island to Downtown Memphis
