= History of Randolph, Tennessee =

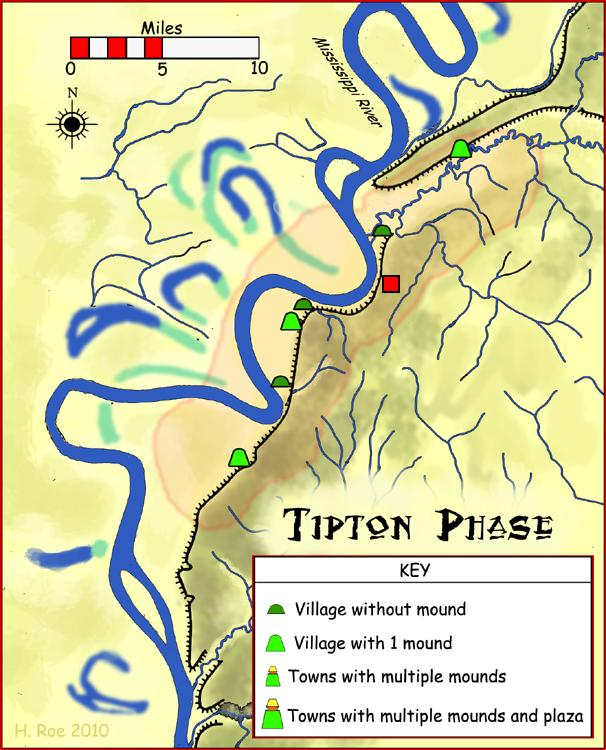
Indian villages of the Mississippian culture during the Tipton phase (ca. 800 CE to 1600 CE) Location of Randolph, Tennessee

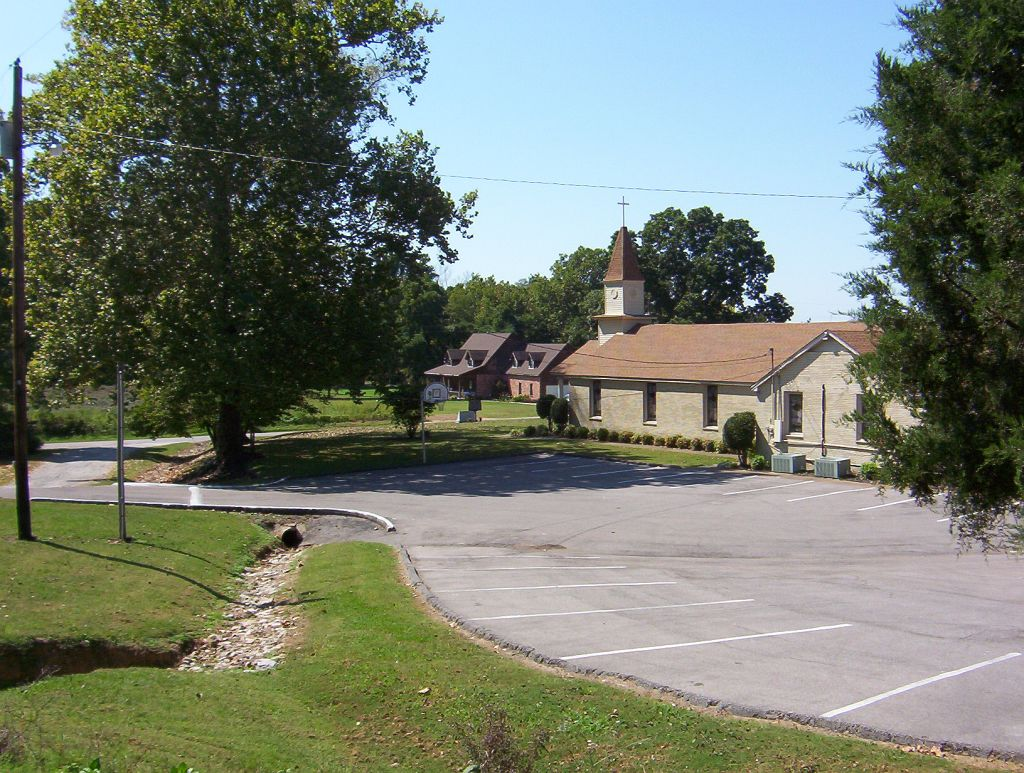
Randolph United Methodist Church (2008)

Randolph is an unincorporated rural community in Tipton County, Tennessee, United States, located on the banks of the Mississippi River. The lands of the Mississippi River Basin were inhabited by Paleo-Indians and later Native American tribes of the Mississippian culture for thousands of years. The Tipton phase people and the Chickasaw Indian tribe populated the Mississippi River valley near Randolph during the Mississippian period. In 1541, Spanish explorer Hernando de Soto crossed the Mississippi River at or near Randolph. French explorer Cavelier de La Salle built the first French fortification at or near Randolph on his 1682 canoe expedition of the Mississippi River.

European settlers arrived in the area around 1800. The town of Randolph was founded in the 1820s as one of the earliest European settlements in Tipton County. The location of Randolph, on the second Chickasaw Bluff along the banks of the Mississippi River, just south of the lower mouth of the Hatchie River, provided for an ideal harbor for flatboats and steamboats and made the town an early center of river commerce in West Tennessee. Randolph shipped more cotton annually than Memphis until 1840. The commercial success of the community also depended on the use of slave labor in the cotton fields surrounding the settlement. In 1827, the Randolph Post office was established and in 1834, the first pastor was appointed to the Randolph Methodist congregation.

The fortunes of the community began to decline in the late 1840s due to failed railroad development, an unfavorable mail route and an unsuccessful attempt to move the county seat from Covington to Randolph. An unfinished project to cut a canal from the Hatchie River to the Tennessee River and other factors also contributed to the commercial demise of the town. The first Confederate States Army fort in Tennessee was built at Randolph early in the American Civil War in 1861; a second fortification at Randolph was constructed later that same year. During the Civil War, the town was burned down twice by Union Army forces, which further promoted the decline of the once flourishing community.

In 2008, Randolph Bluff Historic Park was dedicated. The park is intended to promote the Civil War history of the community and make the unique views of the Mississippi River available to a wider public. Once finished, the park will be part of the Mississippi River Corridor Tennessee, a project to "create a scenic byway that connects historic sites along the Mississippi River". As of 2008, Randolph has a population of ca. 200 and consists of about two dozen dwellings. The economy of the rural community is dominated by agriculture with no major industries and businesses present.

== Indian cultures ==
From about 10,000 BCE, Paleo-Indians and later Archaic-Indians lived as communities of hunter-gatherers in the area that covers the modern day southern United States. Approximately 800 CE to 1600 CE, the Mississippi River Delta was populated by tribes of the Mississippian culture, a mound-building Native American people that had developed in the late Woodland Indian period. The Tipton phase people were a local expression of the Mississippian culture. They inhabited the region of modern-day Tipton County during the time of first contact with Europeans, at the arrival of the de Soto Expedition. By the end of the Mississippian period the land was claimed and populated by the Chickasaw tribe. The exact origins of the Chickasaw are uncertain. Several prehistoric Indian settlements were located in the vicinity of what would later become Randolph.

== European settlement ==
=== Early exploration ===
The history of the exploration of Randolph by Europeans is unclear. It is possible that Hernando de Soto crossed the Mississippi in 1541 at or near present day Randolph, although he more likely crossed near modern day Memphis.

In 1682, French explorer René-Robert Cavelier, Sieur de La Salle led a canoe expedition to explore the Mississippi River basin. La Salle's expedition constructed a stockade fort, Fort Prudhomme, at a location that is now disputed, but could have been on Chickasaw Bluff near modern day Randolph. This was the first structure built by the French in Tennessee.

=== First European settlers ===
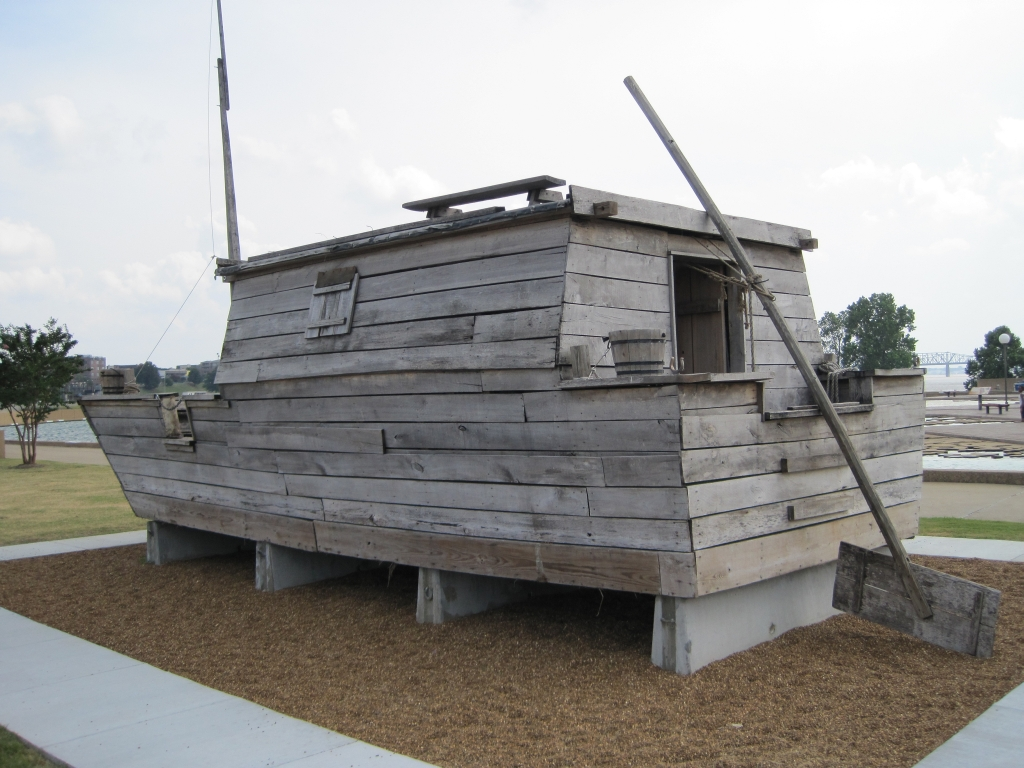
Modern replica of an early 1800s flatboat

Around 1800, Europeans began settling the land east of the Mississippi River that was inhabited by the Chickasaw Indians for centuries prior to the arrival of Europeans. Chickasaw land in West Tennessee and southwestern Kentucky was ceded in the Jackson Purchase after negotiations in which the United States was represented by General Andrew Jackson and Governor Isaac Shelby, while the Chickasaw were represented by their chiefs and warriors. In 1818, both sides agreed to the transfer by signing the Treaty of Tuscaloosa. In the treaty, the United States agreed to pay the Chickasaw $300,000 in return for the right to the land east of the Mississippi River and north of the Mississippi state line.

Early European landowners were eager to secure their investment in land in southwest Tennessee. Years before Randolph would be founded, wealthy and influential investors tried to find ways to get a return on their share of land. In 1818, Judge John Overton wrote to General James Winchester that "We must not let the owners of the property on the Bluffs at the Mississippi above us be beforehand in laying off town—as it might damp the sale of ours". Overton and Winchester founded Memphis, Tennessee along with Andrew Jackson in 1819. Overton, Winchester and Jackson were trying to secure investments in property in the Memphis area that they owned and not give the advantage to investors "above", north of Memphis on the Mississippi River, in Randolph. Andrew Jackson (1767–1845) would become the 7th President of the United States in 1829.

Both Memphis and Randolph are located on one of the four Chickasaw Bluffs, Randolph on the second and Memphis on the fourth. In the early 19th century, the terrain of the Chickasaw Bluffs provided promising locations for a harbor on the Mississippi River for both emerging towns. In 1820, the area that would become Randolph had an estimated population of 54.

=== Establishment ===
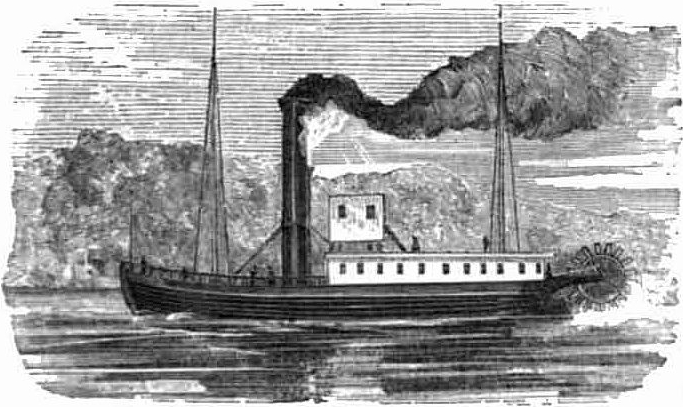
Mississippi River steamboat (1815)

Early in the 1820s, landowners and investors John T. Brown and Robert Bedford were the proprietors of the land on the second Chickasaw Bluff that would form Randolph a few years later. Only 40–50 miles (60–80 km) north of Memphis by water, they described the area as "a good landing for Mississippi River flatboats". The Hatchie River, joining the Mississippi River just north of the second Chickasaw Bluff, was accessible to steamboats for 60 miles (100 km) upriver to Bolivar, in Hardeman County. Brown and Bedford chose the site on the second Chickasaw Bluff to lay out the plan for Randolph, a promising river town.

The Tennessee Encyclopedia of History and Culture gives the date of Randolph's official establishment as 1823. Other reports date the foundation to 1827 or 1828. The founders of Randolph named the community for John Randolph (1773–1833), a leader in the United States Congress from Virginia and spokesman for the "Old Republican" faction of the Democratic-Republican Party. The Old Republican faction wanted to restrict the federal government's roles.

== Cotton commerce ==
=== Success ===
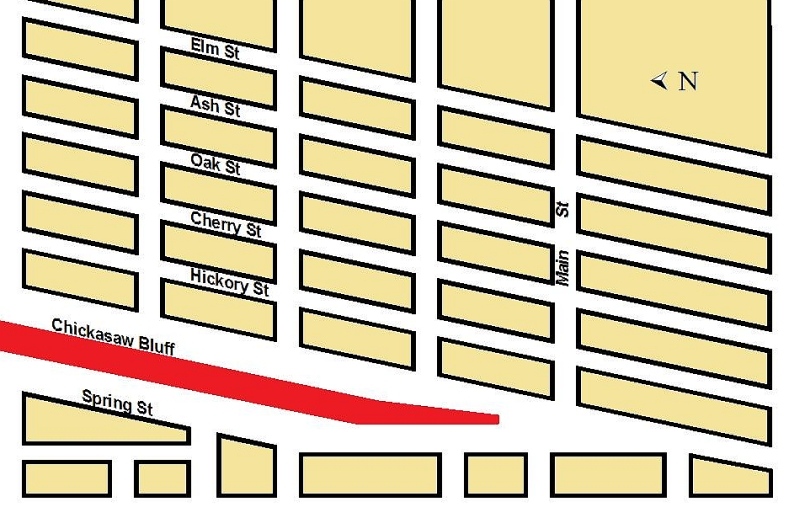
Schematic map of Randolph, ca. 1835 Second Chickasaw Bluff

Located on the banks of the Mississippi River on the second Chickasaw Bluff, the topology of Randolph provided for an ideal harbor for steamboats and flatboats at all stages of the river. Randolph became the center of steamboat commerce in Tennessee and an important cotton shipping point in the 1830s. The town was an early rival of Memphis over commercial superiority on the Mississippi River. In 1830, Randolph was the most important shipping point in Tennessee. In the mid-1830s, Randolph shipped 35,000 to 40,000 bales of cotton on the Mississippi River every year, in 1839 cotton shipments added up to 20,000 to 25,000 bales. More cotton was shipped from Randolph than from Memphis until 1840. At the peak of its commercial success, the community was called the "great steamboat depot of West Tennessee".

By 1829, Randolph had three commission warehouses, six dry goods stores, ten physicians and one tavern; 20 to 30 families were making their living in the area around Randolph. Early in the 1830s, the town developed quickly. Randolph had a population of approximately 1,000 people in 1834. By that time, the town had four hotels, almost fifty businesses, one of them a distillery, several private schools, and more than ten saloons. "Some time in the thirties" of the 19th century, the first bank was founded in Randolph.

In the 1830s, two newspapers were published in Randolph, the Randolph Recorder and the Randolph Whig. The Randolph Recorder was founded in 1834 by F. S. Latham as the first newspaper in Tipton County. The paper continued business until 1836. The first issue of the Randolph Recorder was published on June 21, 1834, and the last publication of the newspaper dates to September 23, 1836. The Randolph Whig was established either late in 1836 or early in 1837 and published its first issue on January 6, 1838. The Randolph Whig did not last long. Shortly after its establishment, the publication "was soon discontinued".

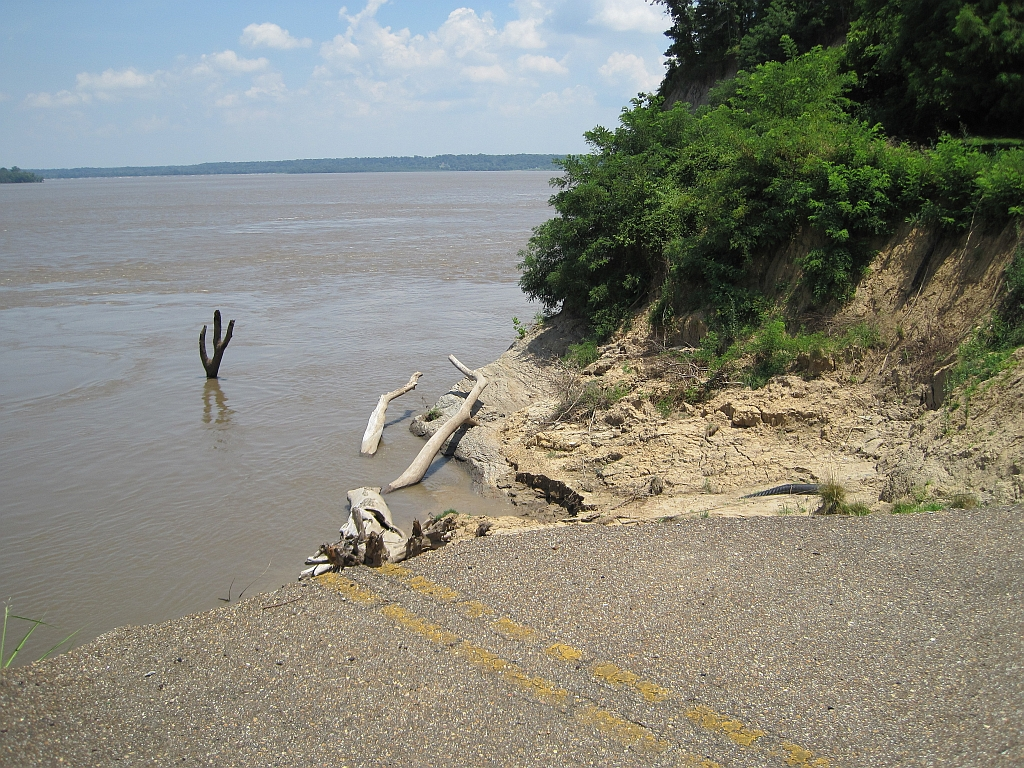
Western terminus of State Route 59

==== Travel routes ====
A stagecoach line, established in 1833 by James Brown, provided a connection between Randolph and Jackson in Madison County, located about 70 miles (110 km) east of Randolph. The stagecoach line offered a convenient alternative for travellers between the two towns and connected the villages along the way twice a week. Heading west from Jackson, the antebellum stage line roughly concurs with modern U.S. Route 70 up to Brownsville and State Route 54 from Brownsville to Covington. From Covington, the stage road coincides with modern State Route 59 (SR 59) to Randolph. SR 59 terminates at Richardsons Landing, 4 miles (6 km) west of Randolph at the Mississippi River.

Later in the 1830s, Randolph was connected by a direct route to Memphis in Shelby County, located about 25 miles (40 km) south of Randolph. The road was a segment of a weekly mail line between Jackson and Memphis on which mail was carried on horseback. The route provided a link between the two flourishing towns and connected the settlements on the banks of the Mississippi River in Tipton and Shelby Counties for trade and travel purposes. The exact routing of the mail line between Randolph and Memphis is unknown.

==== Slavery ====
Slavery in the U.S.A. 1789–1861

A good part of the commercial success of Randolph can be attributed to the use of slaves working the cotton fields of the area for their owners. Slavery was common in the Southern States in the time before and during the Civil War. Landowners who ran plantations on their lands, bought slaves to work their fields, mostly for the cultivation of cotton. Corn, beans and peas were also cultivated. In the Randolph Recorder during the early 1830s, landowners announced public auctions of slaves they owned. For the capture and return of runaway slaves, plantation owners offered monetary incentives between $10 and $100. Rewards up to $300 were offered for the return of a stolen slave if the thief of the slave could be convicted of the theft. The Tipton County jail also published "jailer's notices" in the Randolph Recorder to inform owners of a slave of their incarceration.

The abolition of slavery was prepared in Abraham Lincoln's Emancipation Proclamation of 1862–63. Slavery in the United States was eventually abolished when the 13th Amendment to the Constitution was ratified on December 6, 1865. The amendment declared that "Neither slavery nor involuntary servitude (...) shall exist within the United States". Abraham Lincoln (1809–65) was the 16th President of the United States.

=== Decline ===
Hist. Populations (est.)
Year	Pop.
1820	54
1834	1,000
1861	5,000
2008	200
(1861 incl. Conf. Army troops)

The fortunes of Randolph declined in the later 1840s and the 1850s due to many factors, starting shortly after the establishment of the town. Five years after the settlement was founded, a dispute over the ownership of the land the town was established on, arose over a faulty land title with land owner Ann Grambelling from New York. Until 1835, the pending lawsuit "prevented the growth of population" in and around Randolph. The residents of the community bought back the land their town was founded on for $8,000 in a settlement.

An unfavorable mail line also had an early and lasting influence on the fortunes of the town. When the mail route was established in 1829, it went from Nashville to Jackson, Bolivar, Somerville, Raleigh and ended in Memphis, but Randolph was left out. Randolph was put at the end of a branch route of the mail line and received mail only once a week. Failed railroad development further contributed to the demise of the town; and in 1852, residents of Randolph unsuccessfully tried to move the county seat from Covington to Randolph. The attempt to move the county seat to Randolph was defeated "by a bare majority of voters".

Financial depression and David Crockett's failed attempt to cut a canal from the Hatchie River to the Tennessee River also were problems that had a negative impact on the future of commercial prosperity in Randolph. Early in the Civil War, in March 1862, the town of Randolph is described as consisting of "half a dozen or so dilapidated frame houses". During the Civil War, the town was burned down twice, in September 1862 and again in 1865, discouraging many residents from re-building residences and businesses a second time. This contributed further to the declining fortunes of the community.

== Civil War ==
=== Fort Wright ===
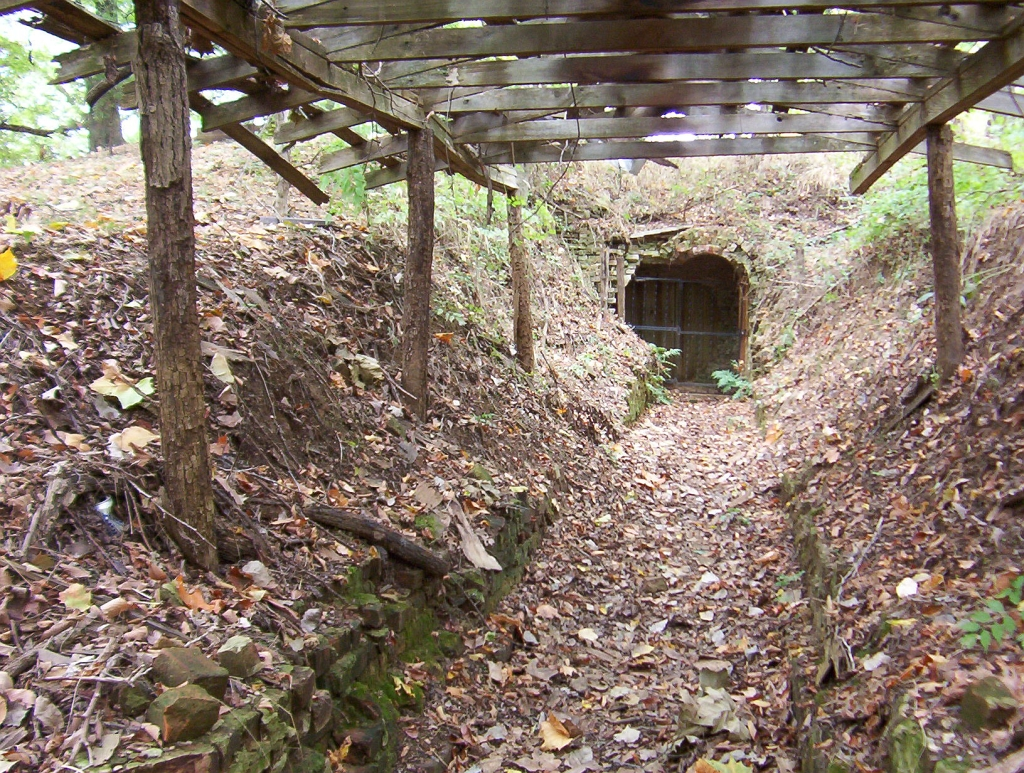
Entrance of the powder magazine at Fort Wright (2008)

Fort Wright was the first Confederate Army fortification built at Randolph. On January 20, 1861, the Memphis Appeal published a pro-secessionist proposal to build a fort at Randolph to defend Memphis from invaders. In a communiqué sent to LeRoy P. Walker, the first Confederate States Secretary of War, Brigadier General Gideon J. Pillow endorsed Randolph on April 26, 1861 as "the most eligible situation for a battery to protect Memphis". Within a few days, in late April of that same year, Tennessee Governor Isham G. Harris ordered to establish a camp at Randolph and complete the fortification. About 5,000 troops from Tennessee, Arkansas and the Confederate Army were stationed at the location to accomplish the task. It took four months to fortify the bluff at Randolph with earthen defenses and artillery batteries in order to protect the fort from land and naval attacks. By June 1861, the construction of the fortification was not yet completely finished. However, 50 cannons were reported to be ready at Fort Wright by that time.

Nathan Bedford Forrest (1821–77) and Alexander P. Stewart (1821–1908) trained at Fort Wright. Other future leaders in the Army of Tennessee and Forrest's cavalry received training at Fort Wright. The fort was Tennessee's first military training camp. Fort Wright was the forwardmost defensive position on the Mississippi River until July 1861, it was abandoned by the Confederate infantry by 1862 but sporadically occupied by other southern forces during the Civil War. In 2008, only a powder magazine is left of Fort Wright.

=== Fort Randolph ===
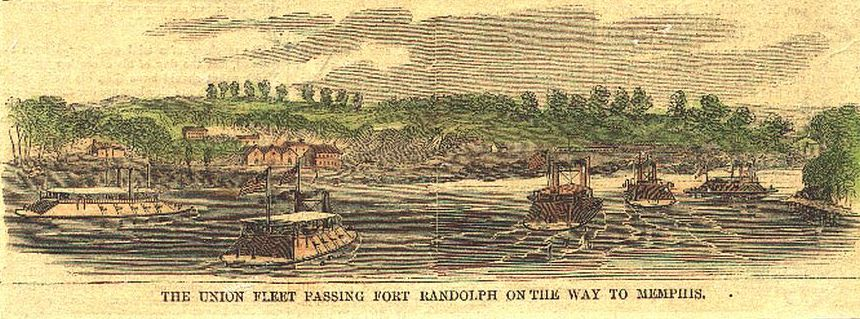
Union fleet passing Fort Randolph (1865)

Fort Randolph, the second Confederate stronghold in the area during the Civil War, was constructed only months after Fort Wright, in Fall 1861. The fortification was situated on the Mississippi River bluffs, about 1 mile (1.6 km) southwest of Fort Wright.

In a dispatch published by the New York Times in March 1862, Fort Randolph is described as a "rough and incomplete earthwork (...) more than 100 feet above the river". The position of the fortification allowed a view of the Mississippi River for 6 miles (10 km), both upstream and downstream. Boats approaching the fort on the river could be detected early from this strong position. Confederate troops at the garrison could prepare for naval attacks on the fort and Union Army supply boats passing on the Mississippi River could be attacked from the elevated position of Fort Randolph without much risk of immediate retaliation. In 2008, Fort Randolph is no longer in existence.

=== Destruction ===
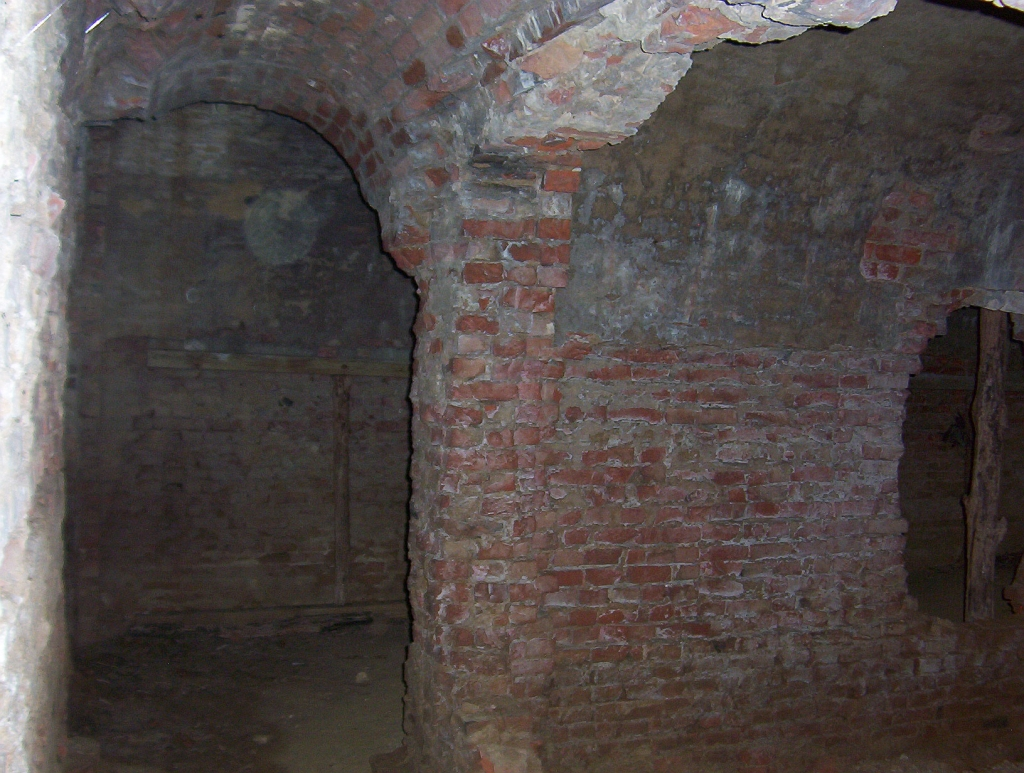
Inside view of the powder magazine at Fort Wright (2008)

In 1862, Union Army Major General William T. Sherman (1820–91) and his troops assumed control of the defeated Confederate stronghold of Memphis and the surrounding areas, including the region of Randolph, located about 25 miles (40 km) north of Memphis by land. While trying to keep the area under Union control, Sherman became increasingly "frustrated by the constant guerrilla activity in his sector". Confederate guerrillas from the Randolph area weakened the Union forces, raiding their supplies and firing at boats that delivered cargo to the invading forces along the Mississippi River.

The Union supply ship Eugene was fired at by Confederate bushwhackers at Randolph while carrying supplies to Memphis in September 1862. Frustrated with raids by guerrillas and with the civilians who aided them, Major General Sherman ordered Colonel Charles C. Walcutt of the 46th Ohio Infantry to Randolph. He informed his subordinate officer that "the attack on the Eugene was by a small force of guerrillas from Loosahatchie, who by this time have gone back, and therefore you will find no one at Randolph; in which case you will destroy the place, leaving one house to mark the place." Union Army soldiers under Colonel Walcutt's command burned Randolph in retaliation for the guerrilla activities emerging from the area. To his superior officer, Major General Ulysses S. Grant, Sherman reported that he had "given public notice that a repetition [of guerrilla attacks] will justify any measures of retaliation, such as loading the boats with guerrilla prisoners where they would receive fire, and expelling families from the comforts of Memphis, whose husbands and brothers go to make up the guerillas." In 1869, Ulysses S. Grant (1822–85) would become the 18th President of the United States and William T. Sherman would become commanding General of the United States Army.

Randolph was burned down a second time by federal soldiers in 1865.

== Church history ==
=== Randolph United Methodist Church ===
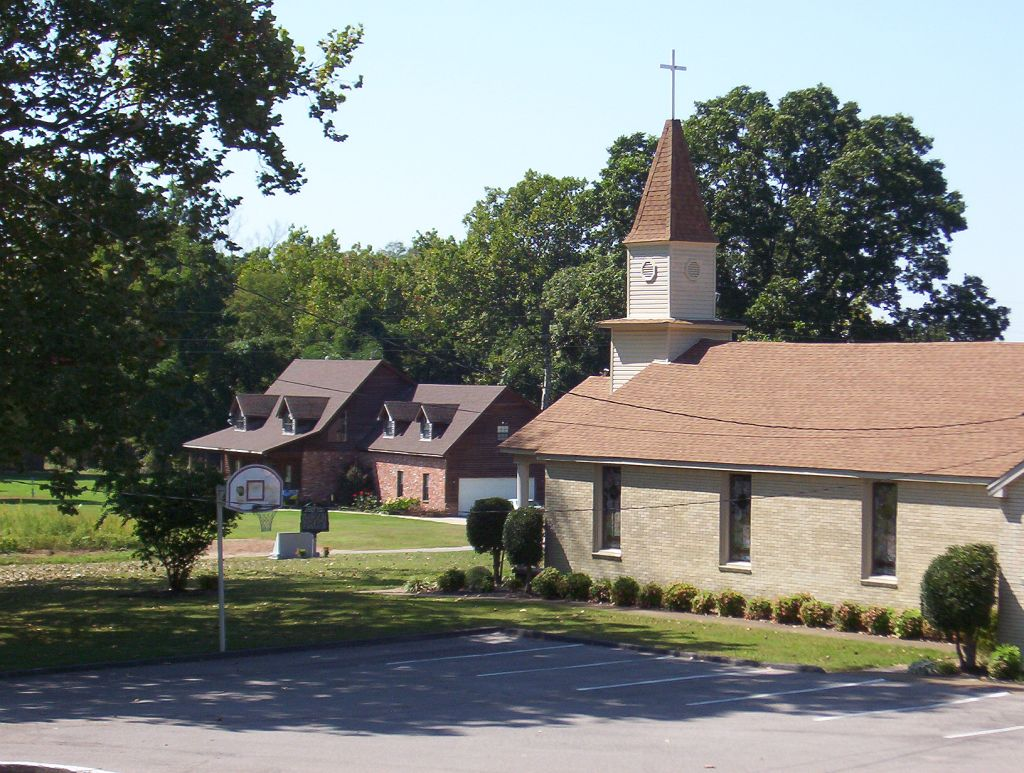
Randolph United Methodist Church (2008)

The town of Randolph was established either in 1823 or a few years later, in 1827 or 1828 by early settlers. In 1834, Reverend Samuel R. Davidson became the first pastor at Randolph. He was appointed by the Tennessee Conference of the United Methodist Church. The Tennessee Conference is an organ of the church focussed on "developing principled Christian leaders for the church" and also appoints leadership roles in the church. After his appointment as a pastor of the community, a congregation formed around Davidson and built a church at Randolph. Almost 20 years after the Civil War had ended, the second church at Randolph was built by the congregation in 1883. In 1953, construction of a new church building was completed on the second Chickasaw Bluff. The building was remodeled in 1975 and serves as a place of worship for the Methodist congregation of Randolph as of 2008.

The United Methodist Church at Randolph had 78 pastors as of 1983. William Clyde Martin (1893–1984) was born in Randolph and grew up in the Methodist community of the town. Martin would later serve as a bishop of the Methodist Episcopal Church South, The Methodist Church and the United Methodist Church. He also distinguished himself in military service during World War II in the Pacific as a Methodist pastor. Later in his life he would become President of the Methodist Council of Bishops. Bishop Martin retired in 1964 and died in 1984.

In 2008, Reverend Thomas M. Yoder and Reverend Ben Rainey are the appointed pastors at the Randolph Methodist community. Randolph United Methodist Church is located at 98 Ballard Slough Road. The worship attendance for the church is reported as 76 members of the congregation on the average.

=== Randolph Assembly of God ===
Randolph Assembly of God is a second place of worship in Randolph, the church was founded in 2001. In 2008, the congregation is led by Pastor Larry Rose and Pastor Frank Russell. Randolph Assembly of God is located at 1135 Randolph Road.

== Postal history ==
A post office was established at Randolph in 1827. In 1829, a mail line was routed between Nashville and Memphis. The route went through Jackson, Bolivar, Somerville, Arlington and Raleigh to deliver mail to the post offices in these towns three times per week. Randolph was left out of the main route and put at the end of a branch route of the mail line. Mail on the branch route to Randolph was delivered only once weekly. On the segment from Bolivar through Somerville, Arlington and Raleigh to Memphis, the mail route roughly coincides with modern-day U.S. Route 64 (Stage Road).

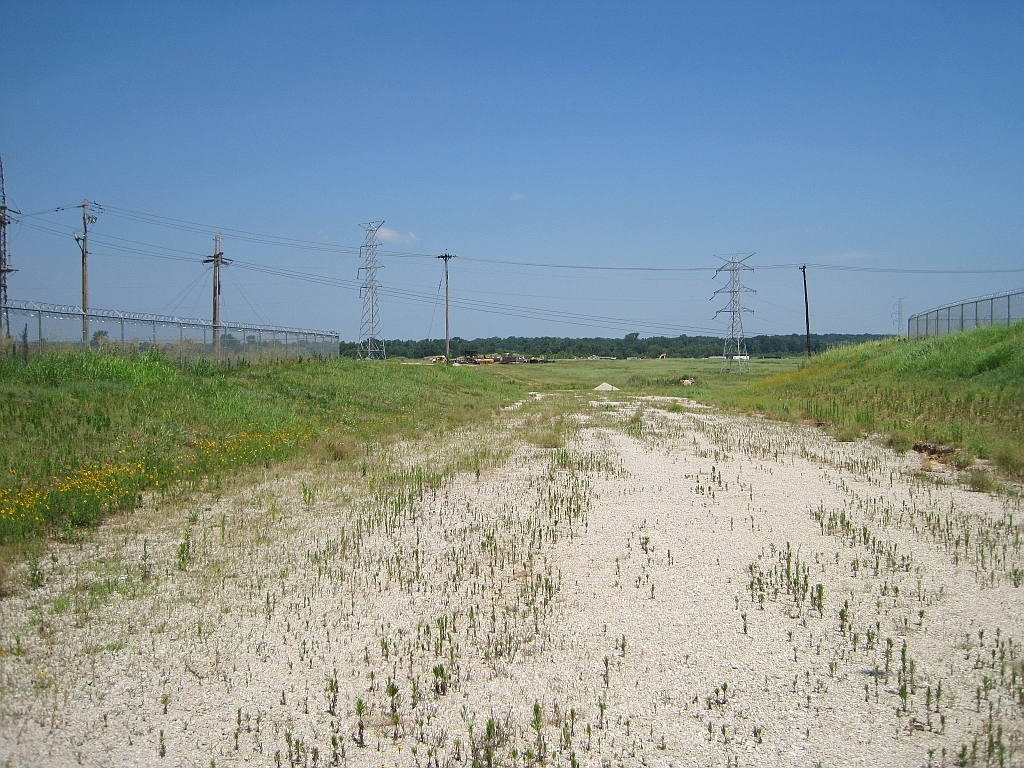
Old Randolph Road in Memphis (2010)

In the later 1830s, Randolph was connected to Memphis by a direct travel route. The road was part of a mail line that started in Jackson, it was routed through Brownsville, Covington and Randolph and terminated in Memphis. Mail on the route was carried on horseback and delivered to the post offices along the way on a weekly schedule. The southernmost segment of the mail route provided a direct link between Memphis and Randolph and connected the villages on the Mississippi River along the way for travel and trade purposes. The exact course of the mail line segment between Randolph and Memphis is unknown. A fragment of the route bearing the former road name, about 1,000 feet (300 m) in length, was in existence until about 2005. The remaining piece of Old Randolph Road was located about 2.5 miles (4 km) north of Mud Island and 800 feet (240 m) east of the Mississippi River, just south of the mouth of the Loosahatchie River at the western terminus of Klike Avenue in Memphis. In 2010 the remaining fragment of Old Randolph Road is destroyed. The land on which the historic mail route was located is used as an industrial property in 2010 and is owned by the Fullen Dock & Warehouse Company. The property is fenced in and not accessible to the public.

The Randolph Post Office was in operation until 1932. The exact location of the post office at Randolph is unknown.

In 2008, the U.S. ZIP code for Randolph is 38015 (Burlison, Tennessee). The telephone area code is 901 (Memphis metro area).

== Modern history ==
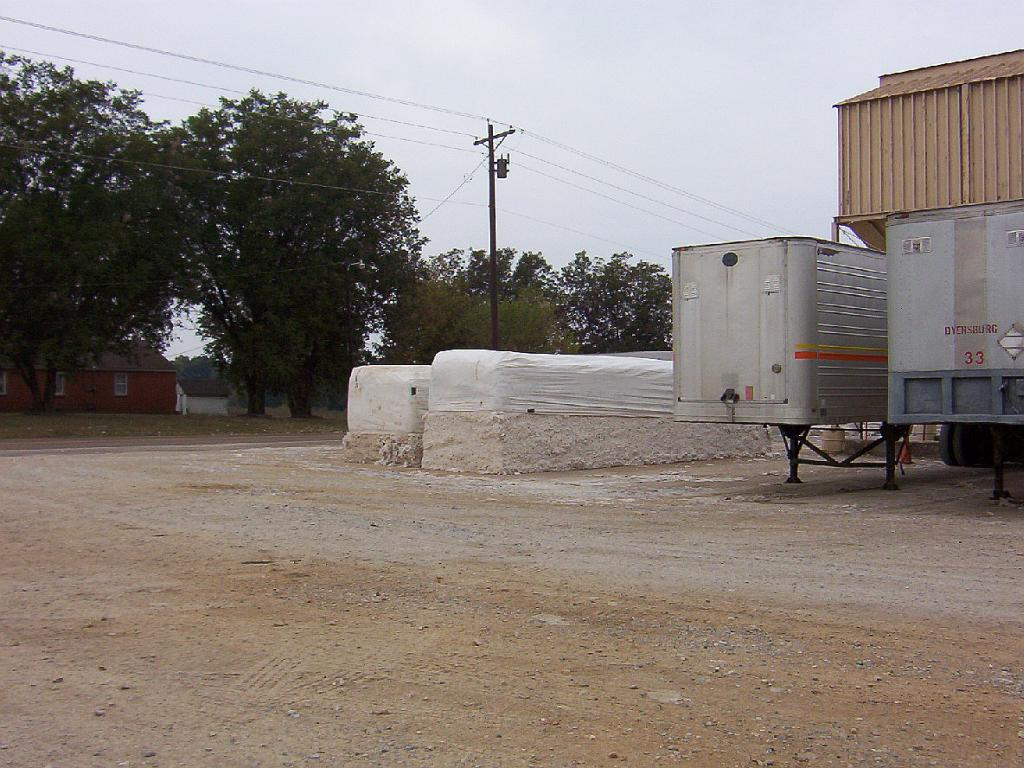
Modern cotton processing in West Tennessee (2006)

Agriculture is the dominant source of income in the area surrounding Randolph, especially the cultivation of cotton. Corn, beans and peas were also cultivated during the 19th century. After the abolition of slavery in 1865, sharecropping was the primary means of income for low income families in the area. Mostly for the cultivation of cotton, land would be used by sharecroppers in return for a share of the crop to the landowner. Modern machines such as the cotton picker have made the manual cultivation obsolete over time as they took over the work from the hand laborers.

On October 11, 2008, the Tennessee Parks and Greenways Foundation, a non-profit organization, dedicated Randolph Bluff Historic Park in a celebration with politicians, conservationists, historians and community members. The 19 acres (8 ha) property on the second Chickasaw Bluff was purchased for $378,000. The park is intended to promote the Civil War history of the community and make the unique views of the Mississippi River available to a wider public, additional revenue from tourism is expected for the community. Once Randolph Bluff Historic Park is finished, it will be part of the Mississippi River Corridor Tennessee, a project to "create a scenic byway that connects historic sites along the Mississippi River", the project also promotes economical development and the preservation of land and wildlife in the Tennessee counties bordering the Mississippi River.

In 2008, Randolph has a population of ca. 200, and consists of about two dozen dwellings. The economy of the rural community is dominated by agriculture with no major industries and businesses present.

== Historical locations ==
- Fort Wright (historical) was at coordinates 35.521121°N 89.887437°W.
- Fort Randolph (historical) was at coordinates 35.508330°N 89.906670°W.
- Old Randolph Cemetery is at coordinates 35.523693°N 89.885643°W.
- Historic Randolph Cemetery is on McClerkin Lane at coordinates 35.52163°N 89.87909°W. Graves in the cemetery date from the early 19th century to present day.
- Old Randolph Road was at coordinates 35.211517°N 90.057089°W

== See also ==
- Chickasaw Wars
- Fort Pillow State Park
- Nathan Bedford Forrest
- List of forts in Tennessee
- Steamboats of the Mississippi
- William Clyde Martin
- Chickasaw Bluff

== Notes ==
There is a documented controversy about the location and names of the Civil War fortifications at Randolph, Fort Wright and Fort Randolph. A publication dated 1868 mentions Fort Wright and claims that it was formerly named Fort Pillow and was located on the first Chickasaw Bluff, the author treats Fort Randolph as a separate fortification on the second Chickasaw Bluff. The known location of Fort Pillow 35.640830°N 89.843890°W and the location of Randolph 35°30′59″N 89°53′19″W are about 7 miles (11 km) apart. A recent publication dated 2009 suggests that only one fortification existed at Randolph which was first named Fort Randolph and later became known as Fort Wright. Different sources give different locations for both fortifications. The Tipton County Property Assessor's Interactive Mapping System provides the location 35.521121°N 89.887437°W for the parcel ID 084055 02500, named "Fort Wright Historical". This is also the location of the powder magazine that is still intact as of 2008. For Fort Randolph, other sources give the location 35.508330°N 89.906670°W, the exact locations provided for Fort Randolph differ from each other due to rounding after the fifth decimal place of the coordinates. The two locations provided for Fort Wright and Fort Randolph are about 1 mile (1.6 km) apart.

The Tennessee Encyclopedia of History and Culture dates the beginning of construction work at Fort Wright to late April 1861 and states that over "the next four months" the location was fortified with "artillery batteries and earthen field defenses". According to Konstam et al. (American Civil War fortifications), the Louisville Weekly Journal reported on June 11, 1861 about Fort Wright that at Randolph there were "50 cannon" present and that "thirty-two of them are monuted". The same source provides a citation from the Memphis Bulletin published after a visit at the fortification on June 22, 1861. By that time, the "earthen breastworks have been sodded with grass" and were reported "twenty to thirty feet in thickness" (6–10 m). Only one "narrow defile on the landward side" was reported by the Bulletin which was "defended by heavy guns" and "crossed by an earthen wall thirty to forty feet in thickness" (10–12 m). A "crescent shaped wall" 0.25 to 0.5 miles (400–800 m) to the east of the fortification provided a defense from land attacks. The contemporary reports indicates a good degree of completion of the fort by late June 1861. Fort Randolph, according to a dispatch published by the New York Times in March 1862, was constructed in Fall 1861 and it describes the state of the fortification by that time as a "rough and incomplete earthwork".

A final determination can not be made in this context whether Fort Wright and Fort Randolph were identical or separate fortifications. It is clear that Fort Wright and Fort Pillow are not identical. Fort Pillow was located on the first Chickasaw Bluff and the coordinates provided for Fort Wright and Fort Randolph place both on the second Chickasaw Bluff about 6 miles (10 km) south of Fort Pillow. As for the differences in the locations provided for Fort Wright and Fort Randolph, and for the different stages of completion reported for both fortifications at a similar date, it is assumed for this article that Fort Randolph and Fort Wright were in close proximity to each other due to the geological features the second Chickasaw Bluff provided, but that they were two distinct places.
