= Marcus Joseph Wright =

- Wright in uniform, c. 1862
- Born: June 5, 1831; Purdy, Tennessee, U.S.
- Died: December 27, 1922 (aged 91); Washington, D.C., U.S.
- Burial place: Arlington National Cemetery
- Relatives: John Vines Wright (brother)
- Military career
- Allegiance: Confederate States
- Branch: Confederate States Army
- Service years: 1861-1865
- Rank: Brigadier General
- Conflicts: American Civil War; Battle of Belmont; Battle of Shiloh; Battle of Perryville; Battle of Chickamauga; Battle of Missionary Ridge

Marcus Joseph Wright (June 5, 1831 – December 27, 1922) was an Amrican lawyer and writer. He also served as a senior officer of the Confederate States Army who commanded infantry in the Western Theater of the American Civil War. After the war, he was an agent for collection of Confederate records for War of the Rebellion: Official Records of the Union and Confederate Armies, a U.S. War Department publication.

== Early life and career ==
Wright was born in Purdy, Tennessee. He was admitted to the Tennessee bar, and practiced law at Memphis. He was clerk of the common law and chancery court. He was lieutenant colonel of a Tennessee militia regiment designated the 154th Tennessee militia regiment. His brother was John Vines Wright.

== Military service ==
Wright's militia regiment was mustered into Confederate States Army service as the 154th Senior Tennessee Infantry. In 1861, Wright was ordered to establish a fortification at Randolph, Tennessee, on the Mississippi River. Fort Wright was Tennessee's first military training camp in the Civil War and is named after Marcus Joseph Wright. Later in the war Wright was the Confederate military governor of Columbus, Kentucky, from February 1862 until its evacuation, and with his regiment was present at the Battle of Belmont and the Battle of Shiloh, where he was wounded. He served on the staff of Major General Benjamin F. Cheatham during General Braxton Bragg's invasion of Kentucky where he fought at the Battle of Perryville.

Wright was promoted to brigadier general on December 13, 1862, and fought in the Tullahoma Campaign, at the Battle of Chickamauga and the Battle of Missionary Ridge. In 1863-64 he was in charge of the district of Atlanta. After the evacuation of the city he commanded at Macon, Georgia. At the end of the war, he commanded the District of North Mississippi and West Tennessee. He was paroled May 19, 1865 at Grenada, Mississippi.

== Later life and career ==
After the war, Wright returned to the practice of law at Memphis, He was Sheriff of Shelby County from 1870 to 1872, and for a time was assistant purser of the United States Navy Yard in Memphis, Tennessee. He became the editor of the Columbia, Tennessee, Journal newspaper, and on September 2, 1875, he married Pauline Womack of Alabama. Wright later moved to Washington, D.C., to practice law.

In 1878, Wright was appointed agent of the United States War Department for collecting Confederate military records. He worked on this project until June 1917.

Wright died in Washington, D.C., on December 27, 1922, and was buried in Arlington National Cemetery on the south side of the Confederate Memorial. He is one of only two former Confederate generals interred in the cemetery (the other being Joseph Wheeler).

== Selected Works ==
Wright published numerous magazine articles and several books, including:

- Life of Gov. William Blount (1884)
- Life of General Scott (1894)
- Analytical Reference (1904)
- Tennessee in the War (1908)
- General Officers of the Confederate Army (1911)
- The Social Evolution of Woman (1912)

== See also ==
- List of American Civil War generals (Confederate)
