= Fort Randolph (Tennessee) =

- Randolph, Tipton County, Tennessee
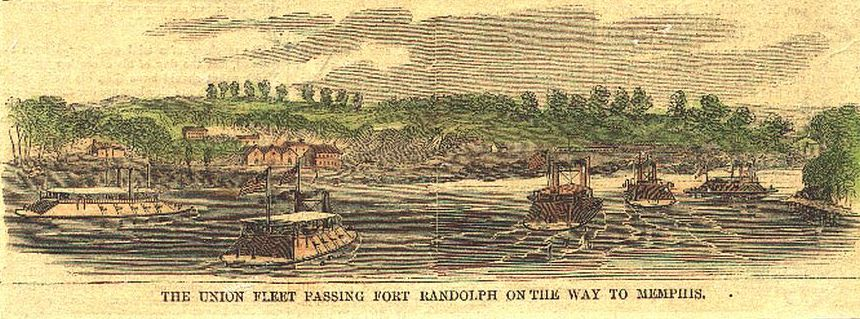
- Union fleet passing Fort Randolph (1865)

Site information
- Condition: Destroyed

Location
- Location of Fort Randolph in the state of Tennessee
- Coordinates: 35.5083°N 89.9067°W

Site history
- Built: 1861
- Built by: Confederate States Army

Garrison information
- Past commanders: Lieutenant Colonel Jesse A. Forrest

Fort Randolph was a Confederate Army fortification built in 1861 during the Civil War. Fort Randolph was located on the second Chickasaw Bluff at Randolph, Tipton County, Tennessee.

== History ==
By June 1861, the first Confederate fortification at Randolph, Fort Wright, was close to completion. Fort Randolph, the second Confederate stronghold in the area, was constructed only months after Fort Wright, in Fall 1861. The fortification was situated on the Mississippi River bluffs, about 1 mile (1.6 km) southwest of Fort Wright. In a dispatch published by The New York Times in March 1862, Fort Randolph is described as a "rough and incomplete earthwork (...) built upon the Second Chickasaw Bluffs [sic], more than 100 feet above the river". The position of the fortification allowed a view of the Mississippi River for 6 miles (10 km), both upstream and downstream. Boats approaching the fort on the river could be detected early from this strong position. Confederate troops at the garrison could prepare for naval attacks on the fort and Union Army supply boats passing on the Mississippi River could be attacked from the elevated position of Fort Randolph without much risk of immediate retaliation.

The town of Columbus, Kentucky, located ca. 160 miles (260 km) north of Randolph on the Mississippi River, was reported robbed and burnt down by Confederate forces in March 1862. "Everything was destroyed that could not be carried away." The rebels fled downstream to hide out at Fort Randolph in order to evade capture by Union troops.

In October 1864, Lieutenant Colonel Jesse A. Forrest, one of General Nathan Bedford Forrest's five brothers, was in command of a company of the 16th Tennessee Cavalry Regiment at Fort Randolph. Confederate units that had suffered considerable loss or which had been fragmented in the course of the Civil War were aggregated and re-organized in the 16th Tennessee Cavalry Regiment. On October 27, Forrest's men attack the Steamboat Belle of St. Louis, Missouri from Fort Randolph. The Belle was on her way upstream from Memphis loaded with cotton bales, heading north to St. Louis. After the boat had landed at Randolph to pick up more payload, she was attacked by Confederate rebels. In the attack, two Union Army Majors was killed on the vessel; 26 of the crew, who had gone ashore for freight, were captured by Confederate guerrillas when the captain had the steamboat push back out into the river in order to escape and save the boat from capture or destruction. The rebel forces suffered two casualties during the attack.

In 2008, Fort Randolph is no longer in existence.

== Location ==
- Fort Randolph (historical) was at coordinates 35.5083°N 89.9067°W.

== See also ==
- History of Randolph, Tennessee
- Fort Wright (Tennessee)
- Location of Fort Randolph and Fort Wright
- List of forts in Tennessee
