= Fort Nash =

- Coffee–Cannon county line, Tennessee

Site information
- Type: Frontier stockade
- Owner: Private
- Controlled by: Territorial Militia of the Territory South of the River Ohio (1791–1796); United States Army Fourth Regiment of Infantry (c.1797–1802)
- Condition: Site only; no aboveground remains

Location
- Location within Tennessee
- Location within Tennessee
- Coordinates: 35.6894°N 86.1850°W

Site history
- Built: Between 1791 and 1805 (competing chronologies; see Chronology)
- In use: 1791 to c.1810
- Materials: Log palisade with corner blockhouses
- Demolished: c.1810 (abandoned)

Garrison information
- Past commanders: Robert Purdy; John Wallington; William Nash

Fort Nash, also known as Purdy's Garrison and Cantonment on the Tennessee Ridge, was a late-eighteenth- and early-nineteenth-century frontier military installation on the Tennessee Valley Divide in what is now the Coffee–Cannon county line of Middle Tennessee. The post stood on the crest of Robinson Ridge, locally called "Fudgearound," and was named for Captain William Nash of the Mero District militia. Two competing scholarly chronologies place its establishment either in 1791–1793, as a militia stockade of the Territory South of the River Ohio, or in 1804–1805, as a Fourth Regiment of Infantry cantonment; abandonment is likewise dated between 1801 and 1802 (federal service) and c.1810 (final state-militia use).

The 27 October 1805 Third Treaty of Tellico refers to the post in the past tense as the head-of-fork landmark of the newly ceded Cherokee tract, and the 31 August 1807 James Bulla land warrant on North Carolina Warrant No. 1119 recites "100 acres including Fort Nash in the center," providing the closing federal documentary anchor for the site. During the John Drake survey of the Nashville-to-Georgia Road in 1806–1807 the surveying party visited the site and produced the only known contemporary cartographic depiction of the fort — a four-sided log palisade with two-story blockhouses at each corner — which survives in the Tennessee State Library and Archives map collection with Drake's accompanying letter to Governor John Sevier. The site is listed by the United States Board on Geographic Names as Fort Nash (historical), feature identifier 1287975, on the USGS Beechgrove 7.5-minute quadrangle.

== Names and aliases ==
Fort Nash was known by at least four names in the historical record.

- Fort Nash — the standard federal-era name, appearing in the 27 October 1805 Third Treaty of Tellico (7 Stat. 93, Article II: "to the junction of the fork, at the head of which fort Nash stood, with the main south fork").
- Purdy's Garrison — used in local tradition and in nineteenth-century Coffee County deed language, from Captain (later Colonel) Robert Purdy of the Fourth Regiment of Infantry, later United States Marshal for the District of West Tennessee.
- Cantonment on the Tennessee Ridge — the phrase used in Fourth Regiment of Infantry post returns for the 1801–1802 window. The "Tennessee Ridge" is the modern Cannon–Coffee county-line ridge on the USGS Beech Grove and Beechgrove quadrangles.
- Old Fort Nash — the name used in Union Army correspondence during the June–July 1863 Tullahoma Campaign, when the abandoned stockade site remained a recognized operational landmark.

== Chronology ==
Two competing scholarly chronologies for the establishment and abandonment of Fort Nash exist in the literature. Both are supported by primary evidence and both are recorded here.

=== 1791–1793 (state militia) chronology ===
The earlier chronology is attested by V. H. Jernigan (1970) in the Tennessee Historical Quarterly. Its core primary-source anchors are:

- Territorial Governor William Blount's 1792 letter to the Cherokee chiefs Little Turkey and Bloody Fellow, reporting that "he is building Forts on our side of the line ... strongly garrisoned for defensive protection."
- Captain William Nash's territorial commission of 14 June 1791 and active company command of 2 January 1792, preserved in the Territorial Papers of the United States.
- Governor Blount to Secretary of War Henry Knox, 14 January 1793, naming the mounted infantry companies of Captain Morgan and Captain Nash in the Mero District militia.

=== 1804–1808 (federal cantonment) chronology ===
The later chronology is attested by David J. Brown (1977) in a Middle Tennessee State University honors thesis directed by Dr. James K. Huhta. Its core primary-source anchors are:

- The 27 October 1805 Third Treaty of Tellico refers to "the fork, at the head of which fort Nash stood" — past tense.
- The 31 August 1807 James Bulla land warrant, entered on North Carolina Warrant No. 1119 (10 July 1784 to John Nelson) and surveyed 11 February 1808, locates the tract as "100 acres including Fort Nash in the center."
- Silence in the federal record — NARA Microfilm Publications M-6 (Letters Sent, Secretary of War, Military Affairs), M-15 (Letters Sent, Secretary of War, Indian Affairs), and M-221 (Letters Received, Secretary of War, Registered Series) — for the pre-1804 window that would document a federal fort of this name.
- An intermediate federal documentary anchor in the Papers of the War Department, 1784–1800: item WDP 41326, Brigadier General James Wilkinson to Lieutenant John Wallington, 2 January 1801, addressing a Fourth Regiment of Infantry detachment then stationed at Fort Nash.

=== Wilkinson–Wallington closing window (1801–1802) ===
The Wilkinson–Wallington letter of 2 January 1801 is the latest documentary mention of Fort Nash as an active United States Army post. The Fourth Regiment of Infantry post returns for 1801–1802 that would close the occupation window are held in NARA Record Group 94, Entry 53 (Pre-1821 Regular Army Muster Rolls), where the surviving oversized Fourth Regiment 1796–1802 muster rolls are physically located onsite at NARA Archives I in map cases 22–23.

== Location and topography ==
Fort Nash stood on the crest of Robinson Ridge (locally called "Fudgearound"), on the modern Cannon–Coffee county line, approximately 300 yards north of Burk Cave, at 35°41.22²N, 86°11.6²W (decimal 35.6894°N, -86.1850°W). The United States Board on Geographic Names records the location in the Geographic Names Information System as Fort Nash (historical), feature identifier 1287975, plotted on the USGS Beechgrove 7.5-minute topographic quadrangle at 35.6884°N, 86.1858°W. A Tennessee Historical Commission roadside marker (marker 2E 40) on U.S. 41 at Beechgrove is the only on-the-ground signage at the location today.

The site occupies the Tennessee Valley Divide between the Duck River and Elk River watersheds, a strategic gap through which the John Drake road survey of 1806–1807 was run for what the survey papers call the "Fort Nash to Georgia Road."

The precise coordinate reconstruction is due to King Wells Jamison Jr. (1931–2015), whose 1977 monograph Ghost of the Garrison: A Topographical Approach to Old Fort Nash triangulated the location using the three Tullahoma-Campaign plates (XXXV-1, XXXV-2, XXXV-3) of the Atlas to Accompany the Official Records of the Union and Confederate Armies (1891–1895) and ground-truthed the position with a 15.5-mile odometer reading from Fredonia Road at U.S. 41, matching Merrill's engineering notation "15 M."

== Garrison and personnel ==
=== State militia (Territory South of the River Ohio, 1791–1796) ===
Captain William Nash's independent company of Mero District mounted infantry — the "Rangers of Mero District" — is documented in the Territorial Papers of the United States at pp. 232–233 (Blount to Knox, 14 January 1793) and in NARA M905 Roll 32, Compiled Service Records of Volunteer Soldiers Who Served During the Cherokee Disturbances and Removal, Davidson County Regiment, for the reconstituted 1794 company under Colonel Isaac Roberts. The Mero District militia commissions for 1796–1811 are indexed in John Trotwood Moore's Records of Commissions of Officers in the Tennessee Militia, 1796–1811 at the Tennessee State Library and Archives, with an acknowledged gap in surviving records for 1801–1806.

=== Federal cantonment (Fourth Regiment of Infantry, c.1797–1802) ===
Robert Purdy of the Fourth Regiment of Infantry — later United States Marshal for the District of West Tennessee — is attested at Fort Nash through his 1 January 1800 quarter-master return in NARA Record Group 94 and through his 30 June 1808 letter to John Overton from "Happy Retreat" in the Overton Papers at TSLA. Regimental context is preserved in Francis B. Heitman's Historical Register and Dictionary of the United States Army (1903), Volume II, under "Fourth Regiment of Infantry, 1791–1815." Lieutenant John Wallington's active federal service at Fort Nash is documented by Papers of the War Department item WDP 41326 (Wilkinson to Wallington, 2 January 1801).

=== Post-federal / miscellaneous use (1802–c.1810) ===
Local-tradition sources including Sterling Spurlock Brown (1936), Doak (1936), the Coffee County Historical Society (1969), and Jernigan (1970) preserve the memory of intermittent state-militia use of the standing stockade after federal abandonment, up to about 1810. Primary-source verification for this window remains open in active archival research.

== Documentary record ==
The primary-source apparatus for Fort Nash falls into four groupings:

Federal correspondence and records. NARA Microfilm Publication (Letters Received by the Office of the Adjutant General, 1805–1821, Fourth US Infantry correspondence); NARA Record Group 94, (Pre-1821 Regular Army Muster Rolls, Fourth Regiment of Infantry 1796–1802); NARA Record Group 107 (Letters Received by the Secretary of War, main and irregular series; correspondence of Colonels Thomas Butler, James Wilkinson, and John Wallington, 1797–1802); NARA Record Group 217 (Records of the Accounting Officers of the Department of the Treasury, including the David Henley letterbook, Southwest Point paymaster, 1797–1800); NARA Microfilm Publication Roll 4 (War Department Collection of Post-Revolutionary War Manuscripts, Cumberland-defense and militia correspondence); and Papers of the War Department, 1784–1800 items WDP 38522, 41326, 44946, 46123, 46124, and 77716 (George Mason University digital edition).

Treaty record. Treaty of Holston, 2 July 1791 (7 Stat. 39), establishing the pre-1805 Cherokee boundary; Third Treaty of Tellico, 25/27 October 1805 (7 Stat. 93), Article II boundary description naming Fort Nash in the past tense; Dearborn Treaty, 7 January 1806 (7 Stat. 101), closing federal boundary.

State and territorial record. John Trotwood Moore, Records of Commissions of Officers in the Tennessee Militia, 1796–1811 (TSLA); James Robertson Papers, TSLA Microfilm MF.801, 1793 Cumberland-defense correspondence; Blount Executive Journal in the American Historical Magazine, Volume II (1897); Coffee County Register of Deeds, Bulla → Frank Todd 1807–1908 chain of title.

Pensions and service records. Revolutionary and post-Revolutionary pension file S4597 (William Nash), NARA Record Group 15; NARA M905 Roll 32, Compiled Service Records for Isaac Roberts' Regiment, 1794 (William Nash, NAID 55733022); Tennessee General Assembly Acts of 1803, Chapter 77, post-federal disposition of state stores.

== Cartographic record ==
Fort Nash appears on eight distinct historical maps in the pre-1900 record.

- 1806–1807 John Drake survey. Manuscript map and explanatory letter, returned to Governor John Sevier on 23 February 1807, TSLA Map Collection. The Drake plan symbol at the site — a four-sided log palisade with

two-story blockhouses at each corner — is the only known contemporary cartographic depiction of the fort.

- 1811 Mathew Carey map of Tennessee. Fort Nash unsymbolised on the base plate but named in the accompanying gazetteer.
- 1814 Carey commercial atlas plate. The first commercial map to carry an explicit "Fort Nash" name label.
- 1832 John Rhea map of Middle Tennessee. Fort Nash symbolised as an abandoned post.
- 1849 Joseph Meyer, Neueste Karte von Tennessee. Fort Nash shown by a "# Fort" symbol within the then-extent of Bedford County.
- 1863 U.S. Army Corps of Engineers Merrill map. Plate XXXIV of the OR Atlas, Tullahoma Campaign; "Old Fort Nash" appears as an operational landmark.
- 1863 Swann–Simpson military map. "Old Fort Nash" label preserved; David Rumsey Map Collection List No. 5384.001.
- 1884 Charles C. Royce, Indian Land Cessions in the United States, Plate VIII. Fort Nash marked on the boundary of the 1805 Cherokee cession in the Bureau of American Ethnology 18th Annual Report.
- 1891–1895 U.S. War Department, Atlas to the Official Records, Plates XXXV-1, XXXV-2, XXXV-3. The three Tullahoma-Campaign plates that anchor Jamison's 1977 coordinate reconstruction.

== Rediscovery and modern research ==
Systematic academic investigation of Fort Nash began in 1970 with V. H. Jernigan's Tennessee Historical Quarterly article and has continued into the twenty-first century.

- V. H. Jernigan (1970), "Fort Nash — Outpost of the 1790s," Tennessee Historical Quarterly 29(2): 130–138. The foundational modern secondary study, reconstructing the post's 1791–1793 establishment from Blount's 1792 Cherokee letter, the Drake 1806–1807 sketch, and Coffee County deed research locating the stockade near the geometric center of the James Bulla 100-acre tract on the Tennessee Valley Divide.
- David J. Brown (April 1977), The Construction, Occupation, and Abandonment of Fort Nash, Middle Tennessee State University honors thesis (Honors 495H, directed by Dr. James K. Huhta; iii + 47 pp.; call number 370 M58w no. 22, OCLC 30326091, held by the MTSU Albert Gore Research Center, recently transferred from Walker Library Special Collections). Independently re-verifies the Bulla 1807–1908 deed chain and adds March 1977 walkover observations of the Fudgearound / Robinson Ridge tract documenting a family cemetery with four legible grave stones at the southwest corner, a large hand-dug well, a pond at USGS-mapped stream headwaters, and cultivated-flower features indicating a former house site.
- King Wells Jamison Jr. (1977), Ghost of the Garrison: A Topographical Approach to Old Fort Nash (privately printed; MTSU Walker Library F444.F67 J35; OCLC 3913915). Fixes the location at 35°41¢22²N, 86°11¢6²W using the three Tullahoma-Campaign plates and documents the descent of "Jernigan's Hollow" (Merrill 1863) into the modern USGS label "Hettie's Hollow."
- Samuel D. Smith (ed.), 1993, Fort Southwest Point Archaeological Site, Kingston, Tennessee: A Multidisciplinary Interpretation, Tennessee Department of Environment and Conservation Division of Archaeology Research Series No. 9. The published palisade footprint at Fort Southwest Point — a contemporaneous 1797 federal cantonment used by the same Fourth Regiment of Infantry that garrisoned Fort Nash — provides the direct analogue for expected Fort Nash palisade dimensions: approximately 297 × 175 ft (~1.2 acres), with recovered corner-blockhouse foundations of 17–22 ft on a side and barracks blocks 22 ft wide and 43–70 ft long.
- Robert B. Roberts (1988), Encyclopedia of Historic Forts: The Military, Pioneer, and Trading Posts of the United States (New York: Macmillan), p. 743. Fort Nash's first national-reference-work entry.

== See also ==
- Fort Southwest Point
- Fort Blount
- Southwest Territory
- Treaty of Tellico
- Tullahoma Campaign
- List of forts in Tennessee
