= William Clyde Martin =

- Bishop William C. Martin (date unknown)
- Born: July 28, 1893; Randolph, Tennessee
- Died: August 30, 1984 (aged 91)
- Education: B.A (1918), B.D. (1921), D.D. (1929), LL.D. (1940), LL.D. (1944)
- Alma mater: University of Arkansas; University of Aberdeen; Southern Methodist University
- Occupation(s): Pastor, Bishop
- Spouse: Sally Katherine Beene
- Children: Donald Hankey Martin, Mary Catharine Martin and John Lee Martin
- Parent(s): John Harmon Martin and Leila Martin, née Ballard

William Clyde Martin (July 28, 1893 – August 30, 1984) was a bishop of the Methodist Episcopal Church South, The Methodist Church and the United Methodist Church. He distinguished himself in military service during World War I as a Methodist pastor and held ecumenical ministries with the National Council of Churches and the World Council of Churches.

== Birth and family ==
Martin was born July 28, 1893, in Randolph, Tennessee, as the son of John Harmon and Leila Martin, née Ballard. He married his stepsister Sally Katherine Beene on July 1, 1918. The couple had three children, Donald Hankey Martin who served in the United States Army Air Forces during World War II, Mary Catharine Martin, and John Lee Martin who served in the United States Army (U.S. Army) during World War II.

== Education and military service ==
Martin attended the University of Arkansas from 1913 to 1914, graduating from Hendrix College with a Bachelor of Arts (B.A.) degree in 1918. He attended the University of Aberdeen in 1919 and earned the Bachelor of Divinity (B.D.) degree from Southern Methodist University in 1921. Martin was a member of Chi Alpha and Theta Phi fraternities.

Martin served in the U.S. Army during World War I.

== Ordained ministry ==
Reverend Martin was ordained in 1921. He was appointed the pastor of Grace Methodist Church in Houston, Texas, in 1921 and served as a pastor for the church until 1925. Martin next served as pastor of the First Methodist Church in Port Arthur from 1925 until 1928. He was appointed the pastor of First Methodist in Little Rock, Arkansas, in 1928 and served as a pastor for the church until 1931. His final appointment before election to the episcopacy was First Methodist Church, Dallas, Texas, from 1931 to 1938. Martin was elected a delegate to the Methodist Episcopal Church South General Conference in 1938.

== Episcopal ministry ==
William Clyde Martin was elected a bishop at the last General Conference of the Methodist Episcopal Church South in 1938. He was assigned to the Pacific Area of his denomination. Upon the reunion of the Methodist Episcopal Church, Methodist Episcopal Church South and the Methodist Protestant Church in 1939, Bishop Martin was assigned the Kansas-Nebraska Episcopal Area. His offices were at 810 National Bank of Topeka Building in Topeka, Kansas.

Martin was a trustee of Southern Methodist University and a special lecturer at the Perkins School of Theology of the university. He also served on many church-wide agencies. Martin was considered one of the most dedicated and effective leaders in the Methodist Church.

== National and international ministry ==
Bishop Martin was President of the National Council of Churches in the United States during 1953–54. He was a member of the Central Committee of the World Council of Churches during 1954–61.

== Honors ==
Martin was honored with the Doctor of Divinity (D.D.) degree by Hendrix College in 1929. Nebraska Wesleyan University gave Bishop Martin a Doctor of Laws (LL.D.) degree in 1940. Baker University awarded him the LL.D. in 1944. In 1952 he was designated a Distinguished Alumnus of Southern Methodist University.

Bishop Martin died August 30, 1984.

== See also ==
- List of bishops of the United Methodist Church
