= Randolph, Tennessee =

- Unincorporated community
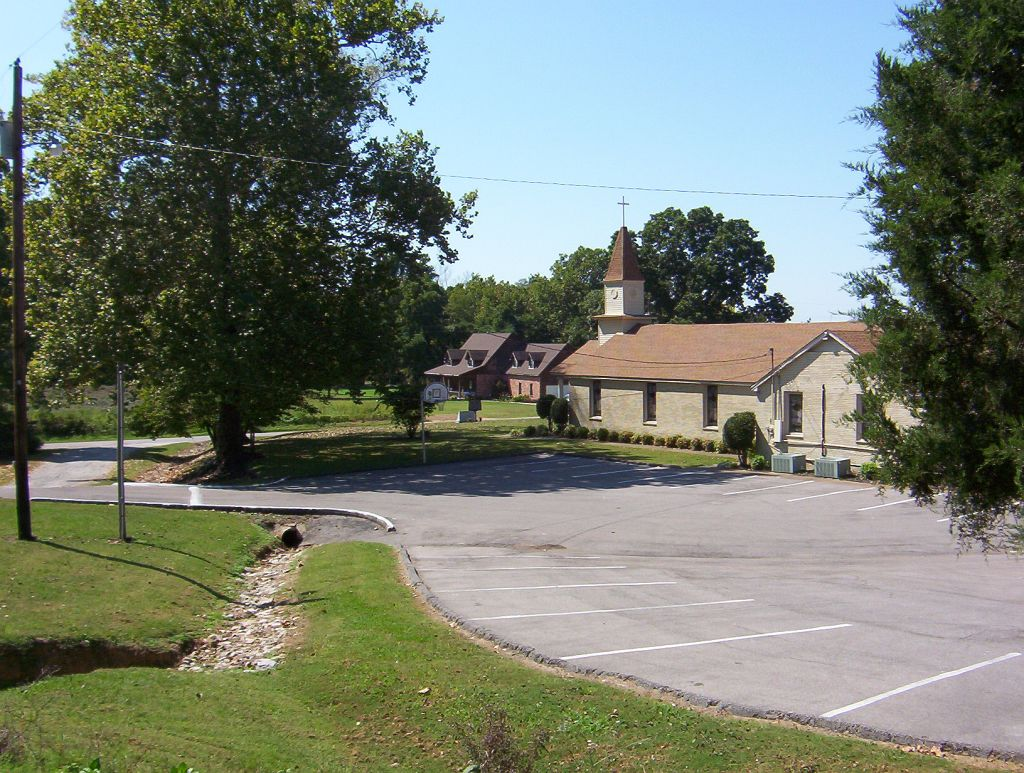
- Randolph United Methodist Church (2008)

- Location in the state of Tennessee Randolph, Tennessee (the United States)
- Coordinates: 35°30′59″N 89°53′19″W
- Country: United States
- State: Tennessee
- Counties: Tipton
- Founded: 1820s

Area
  - Total: 1.46 sq mi (3.77 km^{2})
  - Land: 1.45 sq mi (3.75 km^{2})
  - Water: 0.0077 sq mi (0.02 km^{2})
- Elevation: 315 ft (96 m)

Population (2020)
  - Total: 258
  - Density: 178.3/sq mi (68.86/km^{2})
- Time zone: UTC-6 (CST)
  - Summer (DST): UTC-5 (CDT)
- ZIP code: 38015 (Burlison, Tennessee)
- Area code: 901 (Memphis metro area)
- FIPS code: 47-61560
- GNIS feature ID: 1298899

Randolph is a rural unincorporated community in Tipton County, Tennessee, United States, located on the banks of the Mississippi River. Randolph was founded in the 1820s and in 1827, the Randolph post office was established. In the 1830s, the town became an early center of river commerce in West Tennessee. Randolph shipped more cotton annually than Memphis until 1840. In 1834, the first pastor of the Methodist congregation was appointed. The fortunes of the community began to decline in the late 1840s due to failed railroad development, an unfavorable mail route and other factors. The first Confederate States Army fort in Tennessee was built at Randolph early in the Civil War in 1861, a second fortification at Randolph was constructed later that same year. During the Civil War, the town was burned down twice by Union Army forces.

The settlement is located on the second Chickasaw Bluff, the landscape is dominated by valleys carved into the soil as a product of erosion. The surface soil is composed mostly of silt loam, derived from eroded loess, and is found in different qualities and at different stages of erosion. The stratum beneath the surface consists of glacial gravel. Randolph is situated on the southeastern edge of the New Madrid Seismic Zone, an area with a high earthquake risk. Between 1974 and 2004, forty-five earthquakes were recorded in a radius of 20 miles (32 km) around the settlement. Located in the humid subtropical climate zone, the climate is characterized by hot, humid summers and chilly to mild winters.

In 2008, Randolph Bluff Historic Park was dedicated. The park is intended to promote the Civil War history of the community and make the unique views of the Mississippi River available to a wider public. As of 2008, Randolph has a population of about 200 and consists of about two dozen dwellings. The economy of the rural community is dominated by agriculture with no major industries and businesses present. The Girl Scouts Heart of the South operates a camp at Randolph.

== History ==
=== European settlement ===
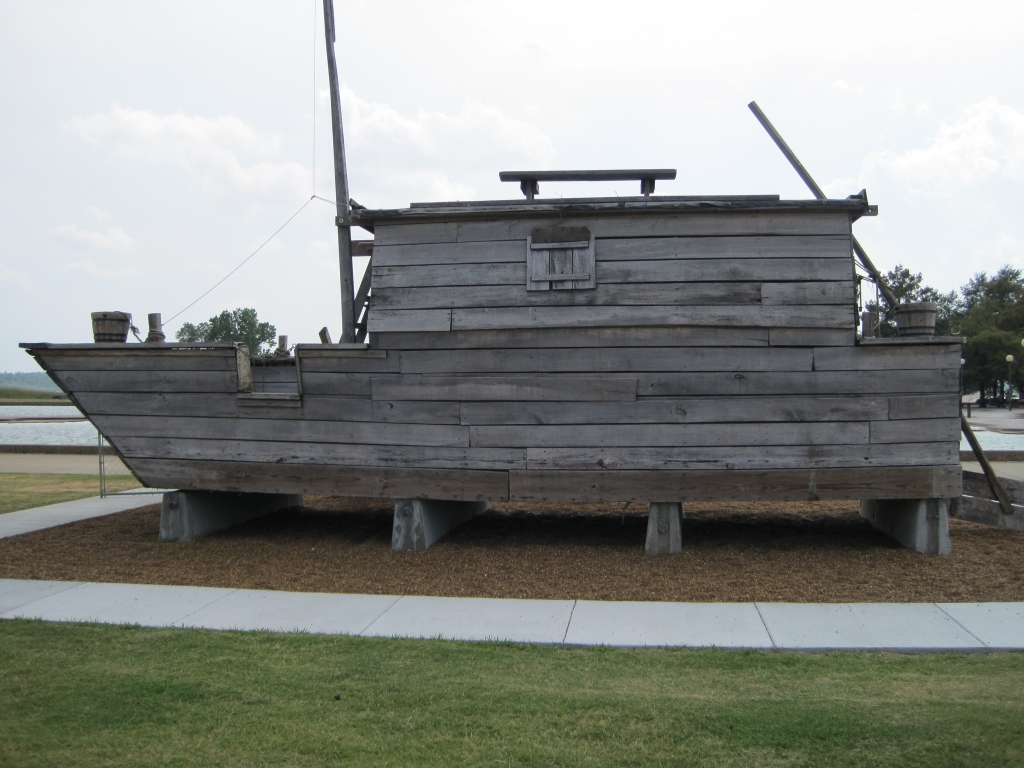
Modern replica of an early 1800s flatboat

Around 1800, Europeans began settling the land east of the Mississippi River that was inhabited by the Chickasaw Indians for centuries prior to the arrival of Europeans. Chickasaw land in West Tennessee and southwestern Kentucky was ceded in the Jackson Purchase. In 1818, both sides agreed to the transfer by signing the Treaty of Tuscaloosa.

In the early 19th century, the terrain of the Chickasaw Bluffs provided promising locations for a harbor on the Mississippi River for Randolph. In 1820, the area had an estimated population of 54. Early in the 1820s, investors John T. Brown and Robert Bedford were the owners of the land that would form Randolph a few years later. Only 40–50 miles (60–80 km) north of Memphis by water, they described the area as "a good landing for Mississippi River flatboats". The Hatchie River, joining the Mississippi River just north of Randolph, was accessible to steamboats upriver to Bolivar. Brown and Bedford chose the site to lay out the plan for Randolph, a promising river town. The Tennessee Encyclopedia of History and Culture gives the date of Randolph's official establishment as 1823. Other reports date the foundation to 1827 or 1828. The settlement is named for John Randolph (1773–1833), a leader in the United States Congress from Virginia.

=== Cotton commerce ===
==== Success ====
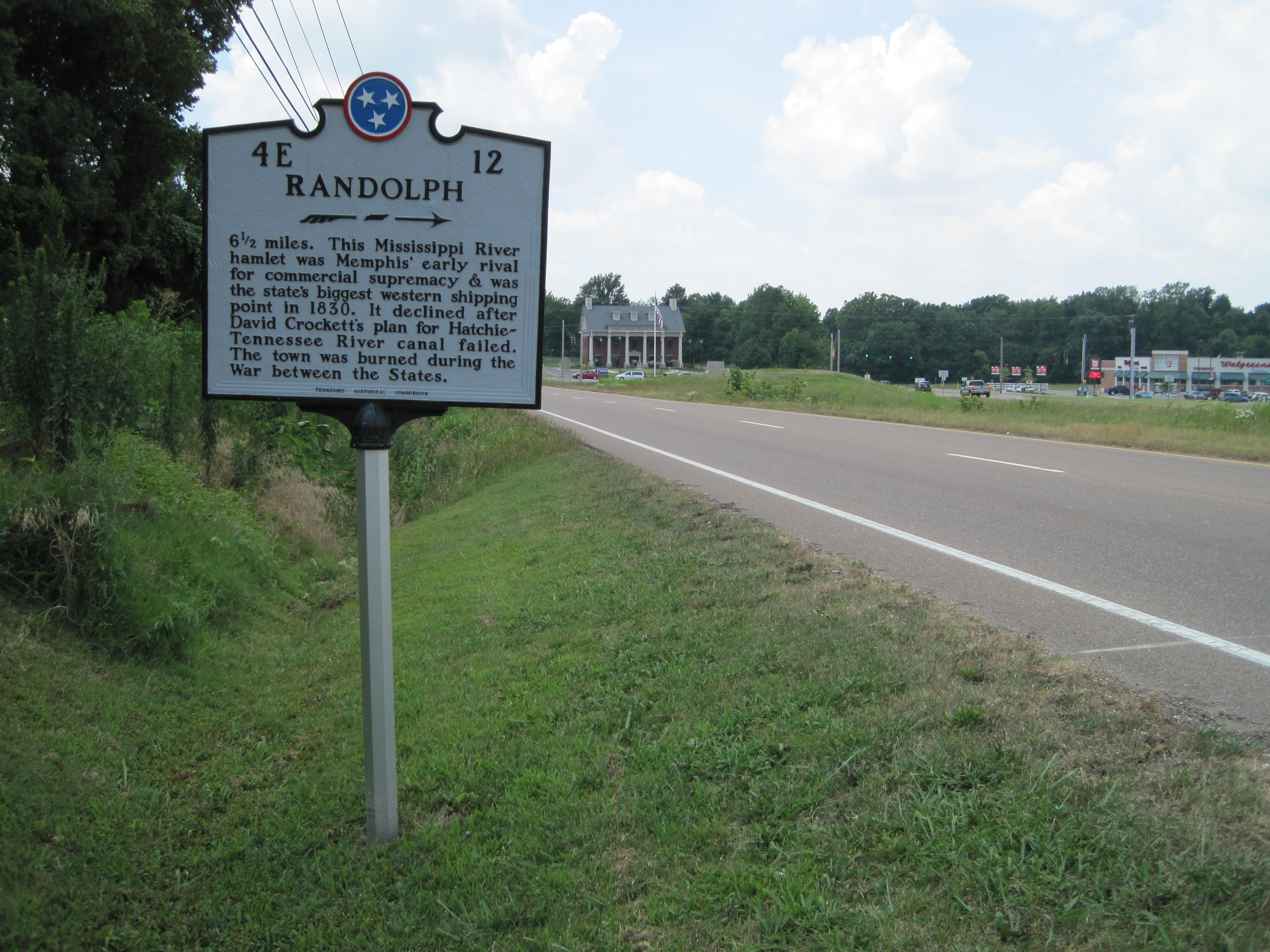
Randolph historical marker in Atoka

Located on the banks of the Mississippi River, the topography of Randolph provided for an ideal harbor for steamboats and flatboats at all river stages. Randolph became the center of steamboat commerce in Tennessee. The town was an early rival of Memphis over commercial superiority on the Mississippi River. In 1830, Randolph was the most important shipping point in Tennessee. In the mid-1830s, Randolph shipped up to 40,000 bales of cotton on the Mississippi River every year. More cotton was shipped from Randolph than from Memphis until 1840. At the peak of its commercial success, the community was called the "great steamboat depot of West Tennessee".

By 1829, Randolph had three commission warehouses, six dry goods stores, ten physicians and one tavern. In 1834, Randolph had a population of approximately 1,000. By that time, the town had four hotels, almost fifty businesses, private schools, and more than ten saloons. In the 1830s, two newspapers were published in Randolph, the Randolph Recorder and the Randolph Whig. In the 1830s, the first bank was founded and a stagecoach line provided a connection between Randolph and Jackson twice a week. The commercial success of Randolph can be attributed in part to the use of slave labor, mostly for the cultivation of cotton. Corn, beans and peas were also cultivated. In the Randolph Recorder during the early 1830s, landowners announced public auctions of slaves or offered rewards for runaway or stolen slaves.

==== Decline ====
Hist. Populations (est.)
Year	Pop.
1820	54
1834	1,000
1861	300
2020	258
Source: U.S. Decennial Census

The fortunes of Randolph declined in the later 1840s and the 1850s due to many factors, starting shortly after the establishment of the town. Five years after the settlement was founded, a dispute over the ownership of the land the town was established on, arose over a faulty land title with land owner Ann Grambelling from New York. Until 1835, the pending lawsuit "prevented the growth of population" in and around Randolph. The residents of the community bought back the land their town was founded on for $8,000 in a settlement.

An unfavorable mail line also had an early and lasting influence on the fortunes of the town. When the mail route was established in 1829, Randolph was put at the end of a branch route of the mail line and received mail only once a week. Failed railroad development further contributed to the demise of the town; and in 1852, residents of Randolph unsuccessfully tried to move the county seat from Covington to Randolph. Financial depression and David Crockett's failed attempt to cut a canal from the Hatchie River to the Tennessee River also were problems that had a negative impact on the future of commercial prosperity in Randolph. During the Civil War, the town was burned down twice, in September 1862 and again in 1865, discouraging many residents from re-building residences and businesses a second time.

=== Civil War ===
==== Fortifications ====
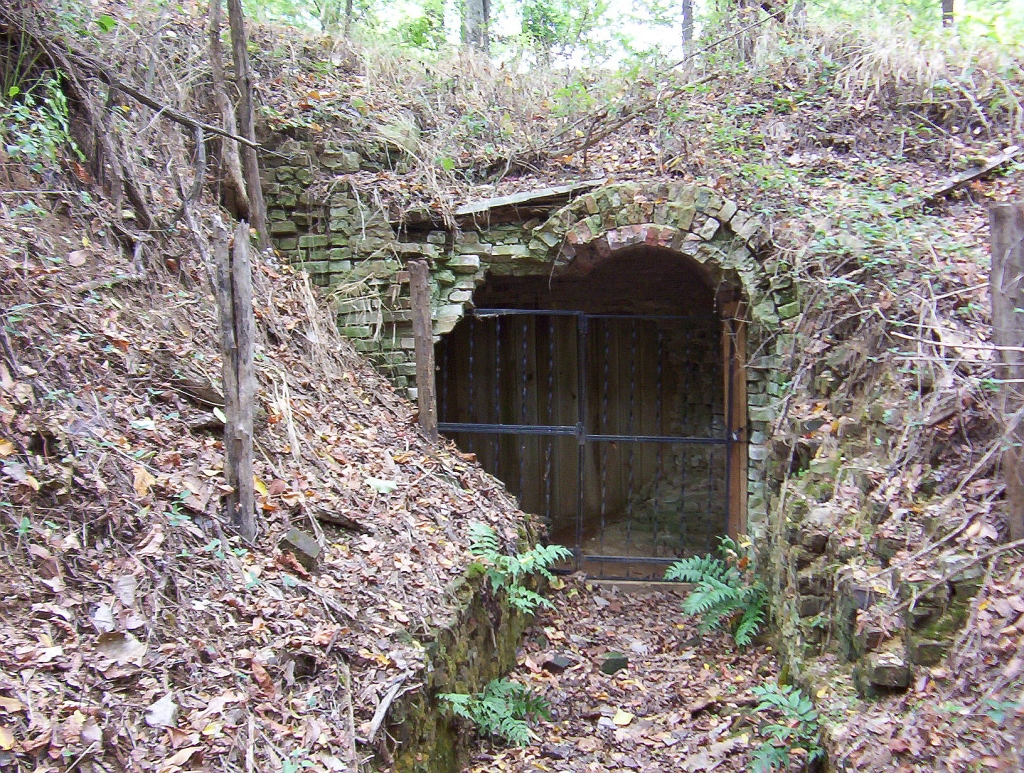
Entrance of the powder magazine at Fort Wright (2008)

Fort Wright was the first Confederate Army fortification built at Randolph. On January 20, 1861, the Memphis Appeal published a pro-secessionist proposal to build a fort at Randolph to defend Memphis. In April 1861, Tennessee Governor Isham G. Harris ordered to establish a camp and complete the fortification at Randolph. About 5,000 troops from Tennessee, Arkansas and the Confederate Army were stationed at the location to accomplish the task. By June 1861, fifty cannons were reported to be ready at Fort Wright.

Nathan Bedford Forrest (1821–77) trained at Fort Wright. Forrest and other future leaders in the Confederate States Army and the Army of Tennessee received training at Fort Wright. The fort was Tennessee's first military training camp in which soldiers could gain experience in the construction of fortifications and the setup of artillery batteries. Fort Wright was the forwardmost defensive position on the Mississippi River until July 1861. In 2008, only a powder magazine is left of Fort Wright.

Fort Randolph, the second Confederate stronghold in the area during the Civil War, was constructed in Fall 1861. The fortification was situated on the Mississippi River bluffs, about 1 mile (1.6 km) southwest of Fort Wright. In a dispatch published by the New York Times in March 1862, Fort Randolph is described as a "rough and incomplete earthwork (...), more than 100 feet above the river". The position of the fortification allowed a view of the Mississippi River for 6 miles (10 km), both upstream and downstream. In 2008, Fort Randolph is no longer in existence.

==== Destruction ====
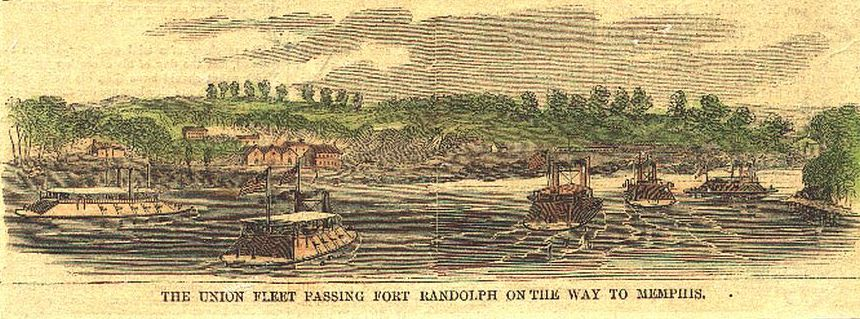
Union fleet passing Fort Randolph (1865)

In 1862, Union Army Major General William T. Sherman (1820–91) and his troops assumed control of Memphis and the surrounding areas. While trying to keep the area under Union control, Sherman became "frustrated by the constant guerrilla activity in his sector". Confederate guerrillas from the Randolph area weakened the Union forces along the Mississippi River.

In September 1862, the Union supply ship Eugene was fired at from Randolph. Sherman ordered to "destroy the place, leaving one house to mark the place". Union Army soldiers burned down Randolph in retaliation for the guerrilla attack. To his superior officer, General Ulysses S. Grant, Sherman reported that he had "given public notice that a repetition [of guerrilla attacks] will justify any measures of retaliation". Randolph was burned down a second time by federal soldiers in 1865.

== Geography and climate ==
=== Geography ===
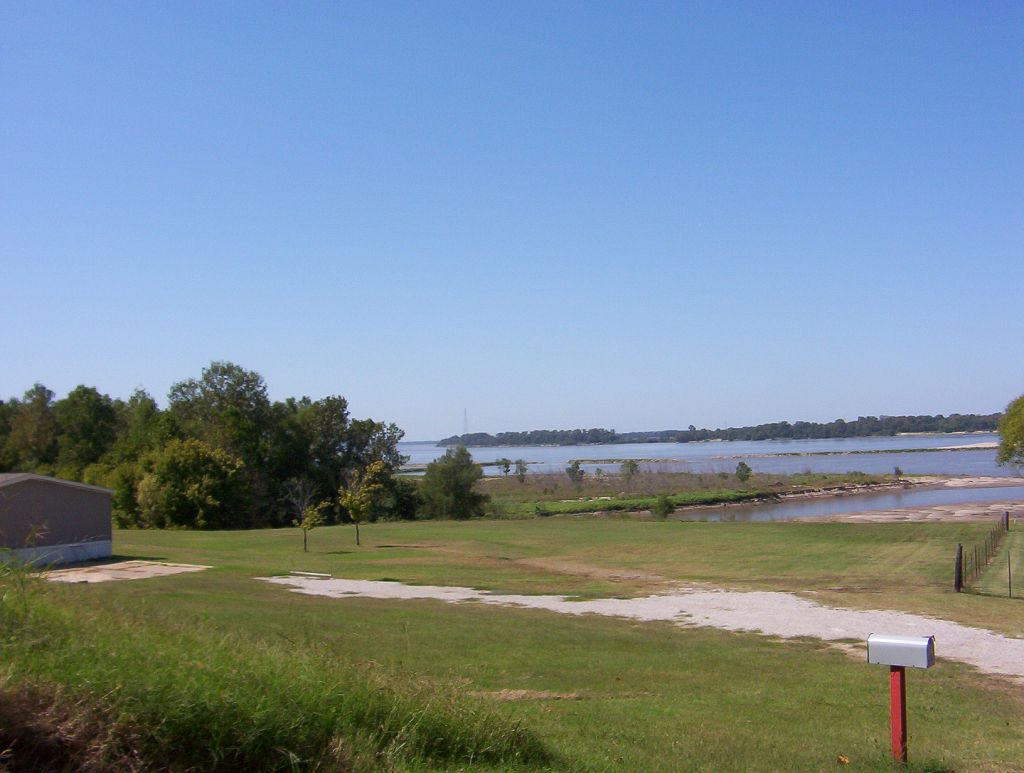
Mississippi River at Randolph (2008)

Randolph is located at 35°30′59″N 89°53′19″W. The elevation above sea level is 315 feet (96 m).

The surface soil in the Randolph area is composed mostly of silt loam of different qualities and at different stages of erosion. About 15% of the surface soil consists of "Adler silt loam" with a slope of 0–1%, found in the frequently flooded plains at Randolph. About 20% of the soil is severely eroded "Memphis silt loam" with 12–25% slopes, and ca. 35% of the soil consists of "Memphis silt loam" with 20–40% slopes. Less than 8% consists of moderately eroded "Memphis silt loam" with slopes from 1–5%. The remaining surface soil is composed of other silts, sands or clays, including "Robinsonville fine sandy loam" (ca. 6%) and "Tunica clay" (ca. 1.5%). Approximately 1.5% of the area is covered by water. The parent material of the "Memphis silt loam" is Pleistocene loess. Loess is a fine-grained, slightly coherent, silty, windblown sediment. Eroded loess consists of extremely fine, sandy particles and forms silt in environments that provide sufficient moisture of the soil, usually caused by occasional flooding or precipitation. Soil derived from eroded loess is sometimes also referred to as loess.

==== Landscape ====
The settlement of Randolph is situated on top of the second Chickasaw Bluff, on the eastern bank of the Mississippi River in Tipton County. The four Chickasaw Bluffs are high grounds above the Mississippi River flood plains, composed of eroded pre-historic loess over glacial gravel. The Chickasaw Bluffs west of the community, on the banks of the Mississippi River, and flat cotton-fields east of Randolph dominate the rural landscape surrounding the settlement.

In the last 150 years, the general landscape around Randolph has not changed much. In 1862, the hinterland of the town is described to be "full of ravines and gorges". Ravines and gorges are valleys or canyons carved from the landscape as a product of erosion, caused by a stream or river or by seasonal precipitation, funneling water towards less elevated locations of the drainage basin. The landscape cut into the soil of the Mississippi River bluffs by water erosion for centuries is still present in modern times.

==== Roads ====
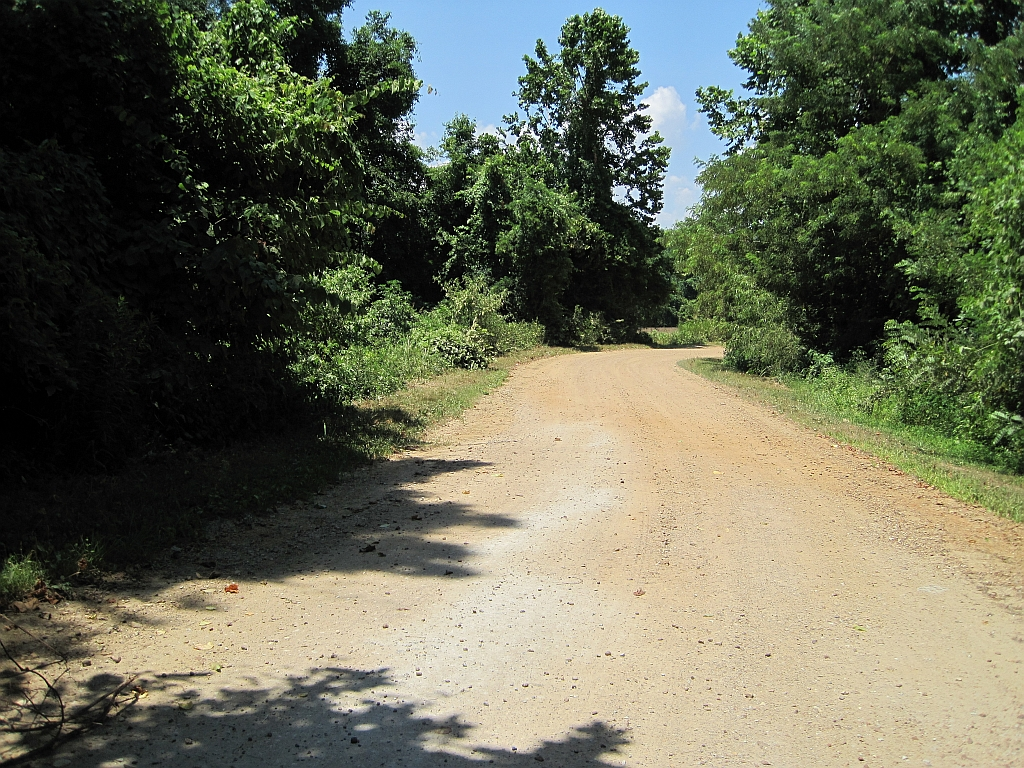
Unpaved portion of Ballard Slough Road

In 1833, a stagecoach road from Randolph to Jackson in Madison County, 70 miles (100 km) east of Randolph, was established. The antebellum route connected the two towns as well as the villages along the way two times per week. Randolph and Memphis were connected by a direct travel route later in the 1830s. The road was part of a mail line between Jackson and Memphis in Shelby County on which mail was delivered weekly on horseback. The exact routing of the segment between Randolph and Memphis is unknown. A fragment of the route bearing the former name, about 1,000 feet (300 m) in length, was in existence until about 2005. The remaining piece of Old Randolph Road was located about 2 miles (3 km) north of the mouth of the Wolf River and 800 feet (240 m) east of the Mississippi River, just south of the mouth of the Loosahatchie River in Memphis. As of 2010, the remaining fragment of Old Randolph Road is destroyed, the land on which the historic mail route was located is used as an industrial property. A publication dated 1862, reports that Randolph is "approached in the rear by several good roads".

In 2008, Randolph is located near "good roads" as well as it was during the Civil War, with the exception that modern roads in the area are paved for the most part. U.S. Route 51 passes Randolph 5 miles (8 km) in the southeast and Tennessee State Route 59 (TN 59) passes 0.5 miles (800 m) southeast of the town. Four roads at county level converge at Randolph, as shown in the table below. A portion of Ballard Slough Road is located in the flood plains, this segment is prone to flooding and unpaved.

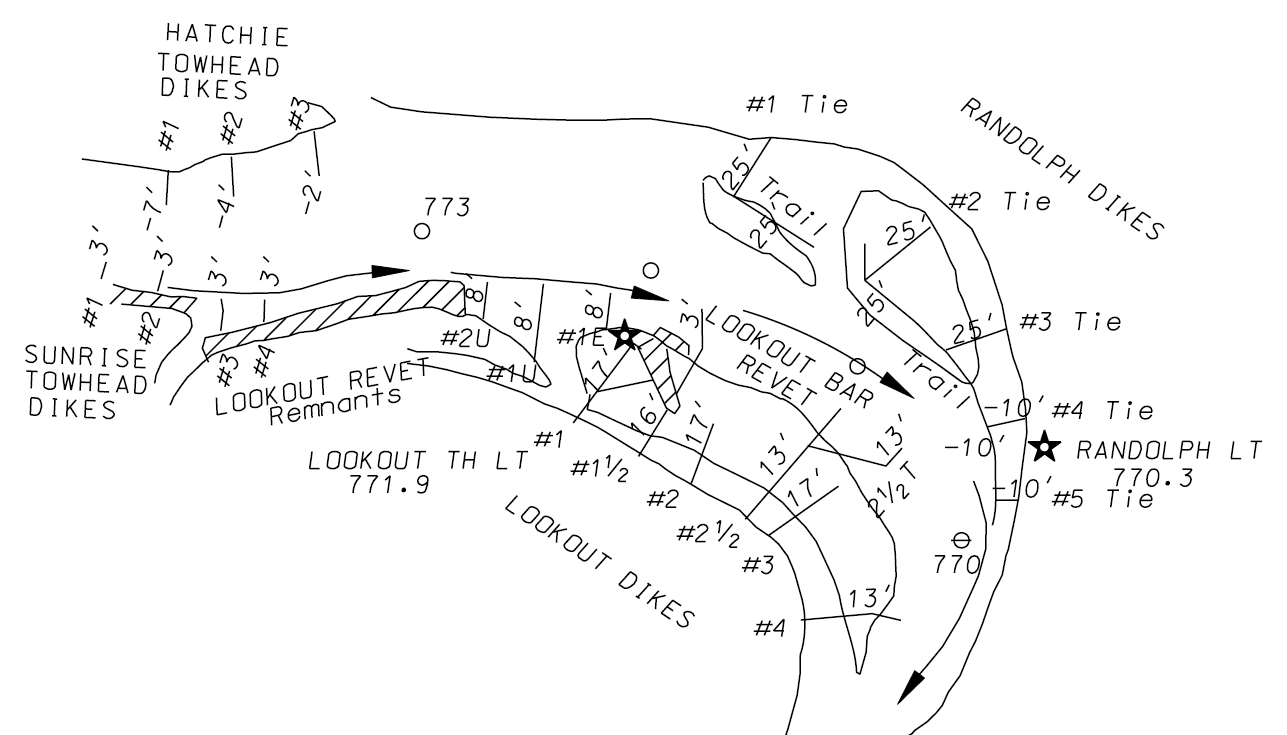
Mississippi River navigation channel and dikes at Randolph (Navigation Bulletin No. 2, USACE, 2006) Legend: ––––––– = Dike positions / 00' = Dike elevation in feet / #00 = Tie number; = Navigation channel / = Navigation light location / LT = Nav. light name; О = 1-mile-interval marker / Ө = 5-mile-interval marker / TH = Towhead

County roads at Randolph connect to ...	Direction	Road name	Surface
Jamestown below the bluff	North	Ballard Slough Rd	partially paved
Jamestown on top of the bluff	Northeast	Randolph Rd	fully paved
Tennessee State Route 59 (TN 59)	Southeast	Randolph Rd	fully paved
TN 59, continues to Drummonds and Dixonville	Southwest	Needham Rd	fully paved

==== Waterways ====
Randolph is located on the eastern bank of the Mississippi River, just south of the lower mouth of the Hatchie River. In the 1820s, the Hatchie River at Randolph was accessible to steamboats for 60 miles (100 km) upriver to Bolivar in Hardeman County.

The United States Army Corps of Engineers (USACE) is the federal agency responsible for navigable waters and flood protection, among many other peacetime and wartime tasks. From 2005 to 2007, the USACE spent $9,773,662 to ensure the navigation of the Mississippi River at Randolph for boats and barges and to provide flood protection for the immediately surrounding areas of the town. Contracts include surveying and mapping, engineering and construction, as well as tasks related to conservation and development of the Mississippi River and the river basin at Randolph. Maintenance related projects include dredging of the navigable channel of the Mississippi River at Randolph to remove sedimented sand and mud. Tasks related to conservation include dike construction to protect low-lying areas at Randolph from flooding and subsequent erosion. The Navigation Bulletin No. 2, issued by the USACE in 2006, describes a stone dike construction at Randolph with an approximate elevation of 25 feet (7.6 m) at river mile 770L.

==== Earthquakes ====
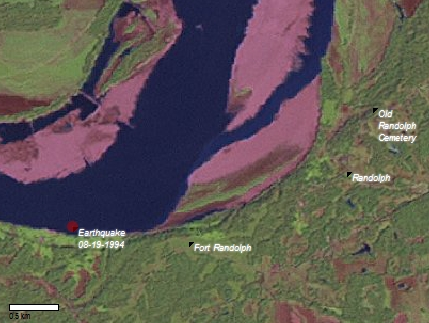
Location of 1994 earthquake

Located on the southeastern edge of the New Madrid Seismic Zone, the settlement of Randolph is situated in an area with a high earthquake risk. Between 1974 and 2004, ten earthquakes have been recorded in a radius of 10 miles (16 km) around Randolph. The magnitude of the temblors ranged from 1.5 to 3.2 on the Richter scale. The hypocenter depth ranged from 3.1 miles (5.0 km) to 8.2 miles (13.2 km). In the same time period, at a radius of 20 miles (32 km) around Randolph, forty five earthquakes have been reported with magnitudes ranging from 1.0 to 3.2 at a depth between 656 feet (200 m) and 12.1 miles (19.5 km). The highest magnitude earthquake recorded in the area since 1974 occurred on August 19, 1994 – the temblor was measured 3.2 on the Richter scale with an epicenter at coordinates 35.51°N 89.92°W, ca. 2 miles (3 km) west of Randolph, at a depth of 6.6 miles (10.6 km).

On January 16, 2009, at 3:09 p.m. local time (21:09 UTC), "a small earthquake shook portions of Tipton County". The earthquake was measured at a magnitude 2.8 on the Richter scale. According to the Center for Earthquake Research and Information (CERI), the epicenter of the temblor was reported to be at coordinates 35.645°N 89.694°W at a depth of 5.3 miles (8.5 km). There were no reports of damage caused by the earthquake. The location of the epicenter was near the first Chickasaw Bluff, about 2 miles (3 km) east of Fort Pillow State Park and ca. 8 miles (13 km) northeast of Randolph. Smaller earthquakes along the New Madrid Seismic Zone are not uncommon.

=== Climate ===
Randolph is located in a humid subtropical climate zone. The climate is characterized by hot, humid summers and chilly to mild winters. Significant amounts of precipitation occur in all seasons. At Randolph, July is the warmest month on the average. In 1930, the highest recorded temperature was measured at 108 °F (42 °C). January is the coolest month on the average. In 1951, the lowest recorded temperature was measured at −11 °F (−24 °C). Precipitation peaks in December on the average. The table below displays the average monthly high and low temperatures and precipitation at Randolph.

Climate data for Randolph, Tennessee
Month	Jan	Feb	Mar	Apr	May	Jun	Jul	Aug	Sep	Oct	Nov	Dec	Year
Mean daily maximum °F (°C)	46 (8)	52 (11)	61 (16)	71 (22)	80 (27)	88 (31)	91 (33)	90 (32)	84 (29)	74 (23)	61 (16)	50 (10)	71 (22)
Mean daily minimum °F (°C)	28 (−2)	32 (0)	40 (4)	49 (9)	58 (14)	66 (19)	70 (21)	67 (19)	60 (16)	49 (9)	40 (4)	31 (−1)	49 (9)
Average precipitation inches (mm)	4.21 (107)	4.27 (108)	5.41 (137)	5.34 (136)	5.22 (133)	4.20 (107)	4.13 (105)	2.75 (70)	3.62 (92)	3.26 (83)	5.28 (134)	5.61 (142)	53.3 (1,354)
Source: The Weather Channel

== Economy ==
Agriculture is the predominating source of income in the area surrounding Randolph, especially the cultivation of cotton. Corn, beans and peas were also cultivated during the last century. After the abolition of slavery in 1865, sharecropping was the primary means of income for low income families in the area. Mostly for the cultivation of cotton, land would be used by sharecroppers in return for a share of the crop to the landowner. Modern machines such as the cotton picker have made the manual cultivation obsolete over time as they took over the work from the manual laborers.

In 2008, Randolph has a population of c. 200, and consists of about two dozen dwellings. The economy of the rural community is dominated by agriculture with no major industries and businesses present.

== Culture ==
=== Churches ===
==== Randolph United Methodist Church ====
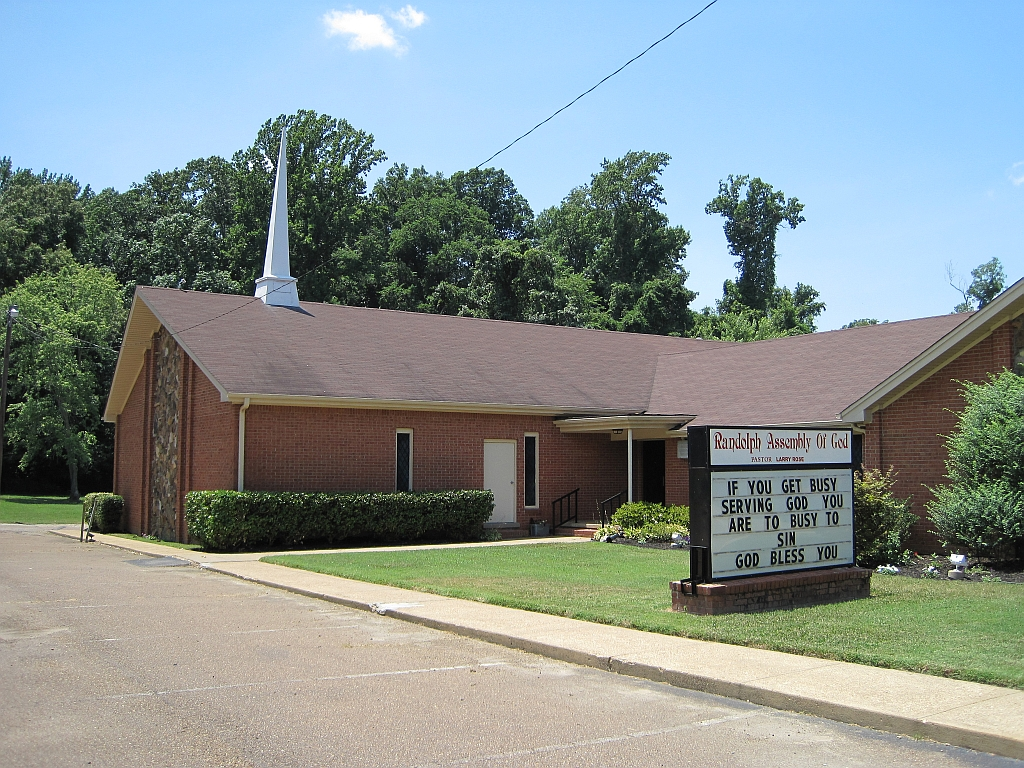
Randolph Assembly of God church

In 1834, Reverend Samuel R. Davidson became the first pastor at Randolph. He was appointed by the Tennessee Conference of the United Methodist Church. After his appointment as a pastor of the community, a congregation formed around Davidson and built a church at Randolph. The second church at Randolph was built by the congregation in 1883. In 1953, construction of a new church was completed, the building was remodeled in 1975 and serves as a place of worship for the Methodist congregation of Randolph as of 2008.

The United Methodist Church at Randolph had 78 pastors as of 1983. In 2008, Reverend Thomas M. Yoder and Reverend Ben Rainey are the appointed pastors at the Randolph Methodist community. Randolph United Methodist Church is located at 98 Ballard Slough Road. The worship attendance for the church is reported as 76 members of the congregation on the average.

==== Randolph Assembly of God ====
Randolph Assembly of God is a second place of worship in the town; the church was founded in 2001. In 2008, the congregation is led by Pastor Larry Rose and Pastor Frank Russell. Randolph Assembly of God is located at 1135 Randolph Road.

=== Randolph Bluff Historic Park ===
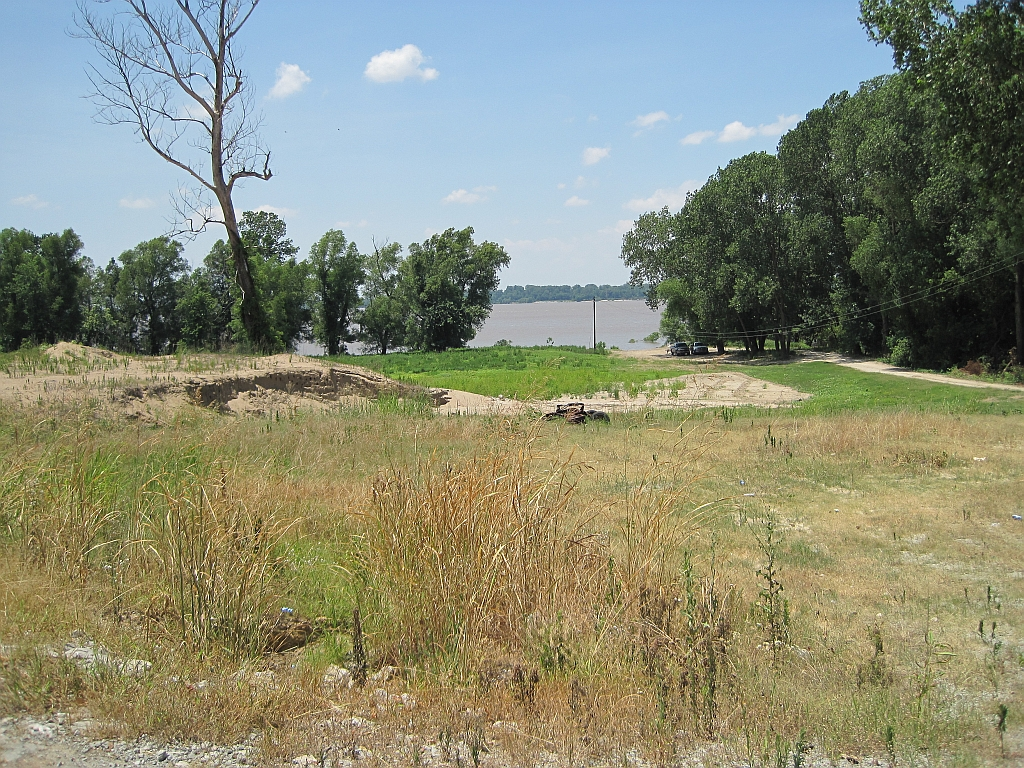
Site of the Randolph Bluff Historic Park

On October 11, 2008, the Tennessee Parks and Greenways Foundation, a non-profit organization, dedicated Randolph Bluff Historic Park in a celebration with politicians, conservationists, historians and community members. The 19 acres (77,000 m^{2}) property on the second Chickasaw Bluff was purchased for $378,000. The park is intended to promote the Civil War history of the community and make the unique views of the Mississippi River available to a wider public, additional revenue from tourism is expected for the community. Once Randolph Bluff Historic Park is finished, it will be part of the Mississippi River Corridor Tennessee, a project to "create a scenic byway that connects historic sites along the Mississippi River", the project also promotes economical development and the preservation of land and wildlife in the Tennessee counties bordering the Mississippi River.

=== Girl Scouts Heart of the South ===
Girl Scouts Heart of the South is a girl scout organization serving 16,500 girls in the Memphis metropolitan area, including counties in West Tennessee, North Mississippi and Crittenden County, Arkansas. Girl Scouts Heart of the South operates six camps and one training center in their area of coverage, including a 104 acres (420,000 m^{2}) property in Tipton County, "Camp Annemeekee". The scout camp is located on Girl Scout Road south of Randolph.

== Cemeteries ==
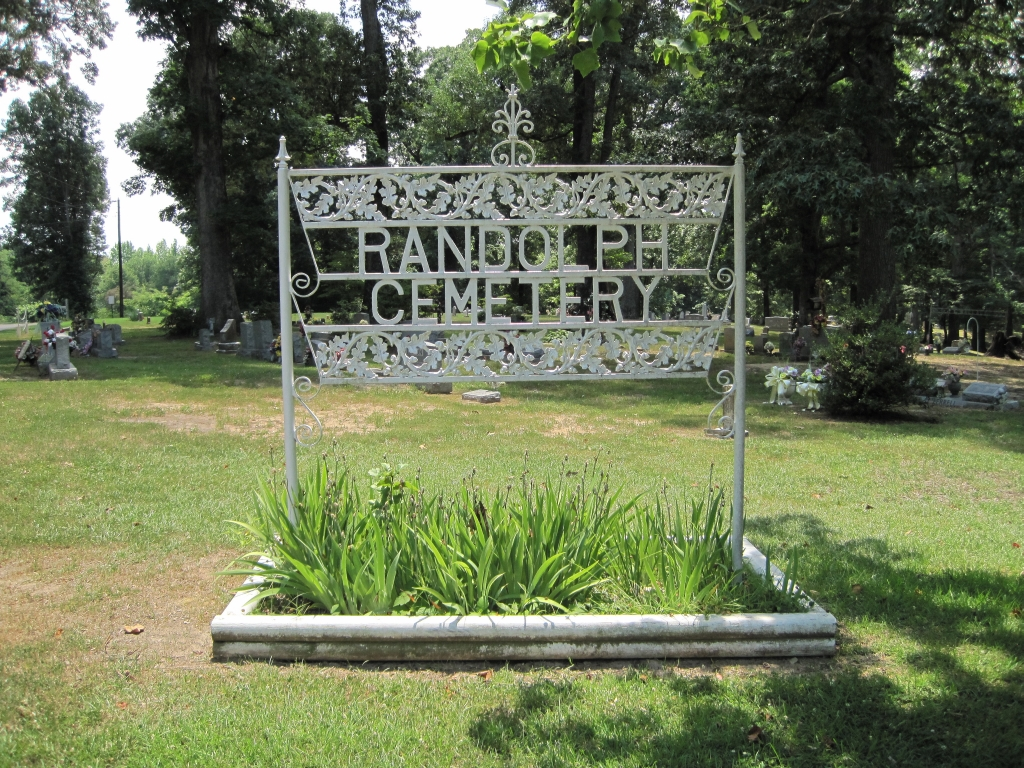
Historic Randolph Cemetery (2010)

- Old Randolph Cemetery is at coordinates 35.523693°N 89.885643°W.
- Historic Randolph Cemetery is on McClerkin Lane at coordinates 35.52163°N 89.87909°W. Graves in the cemetery date from the early 19th century to present day.

== Postal ==
A post office was established at Randolph in 1827. The Randolph Post Office was in operation until 1932. The exact location of the post office at Randolph is unknown.

In 2008, the U.S. ZIP code for Randolph is 38015 (Burlison, Tennessee). The telephone area code is 901 (Memphis metro area).

== Notable natives ==
- William Clyde Martin (1893–1984), a bishop of three Methodist churches, born in Randolph on July 28, 1893.

== See also ==
- Chickasaw Bluff
- Chickasaw Wars
- Fort Pillow State Park
- Location of Fort Randolph and Fort Wright
- Nathan Bedford Forrest
- New Madrid Seismic Zone
- Steamboats of the Mississippi
