= Fort Wright (Tennessee) =

Historic site in Tennessee, United States

- The powder magazine in 2002

- Location within Tennessee
- 35.5208°N 89.8873°W
- Type: Bastioned fort
- Location: Tipton County, Tennessee

History
- Built: 1861 (165 years ago)
- Built by: Confederate troops, directed by Lieut. Col. Marcus J. Wright
- Built for: War Department
- Abandoned: 1862
- Events: American Civil War; Mississippi River campaign

Site notes
- Material: Earth, brick
- Condition: Ruined
- Public access: Limited

Fort Wright is a ruined American Civil War era bastioned fort in Tipton County, Tennessee, United States. Named for Confederate Lieutenant Colonel Marcus J. Wright, it was constructed in 1861 on the second Chickasaw Bluff near Randolph.

== History ==
=== Background ===
On January 20, 1861 the Memphis Appeal published a pro-secessionist proposal to build a fort at Randolph to defend Memphis from invaders. In a communiqué sent to LeRoy P. Walker, the first Confederate States Secretary of War, Brigadier General Gideon J. Pillow endorsed Randolph on April 26, 1861 as "the most eligible situation for a battery to protect Memphis". Within a few days, in late April of that same year, Tennessee Governor Isham G. Harris ordered Lieutenant Colonel Marcus J. Wright to establish a camp at Randolph and complete the fortification. About 5,000 troops from Tennessee, Arkansas and the Confederate States Army were stationed at the location to accomplish the task. It took four months to fortify the bluff at Randolph with earthen defenses and artillery batteries in order to protect the fort from land and naval attacks.

=== Construction ===
By June 1861, the construction of the fortification was not yet completely finished. However, 50 cannons were reported to be ready at Fort Wright by that time, "mostly thirty-two pounders; the rest larger, 42s and 64s. Thirty-two of them are mounted". The Memphis Bulletin published a status report of Fort Wright after a visit at the fortification on June 22, 1861. By that time, the "earthen breastworks have been sodded with grass" and were reported "twenty to thirty feet in thickness" (6–10 m). Only one "narrow defile on the landward side" was reported by the Bulletin which was "defended by heavy guns" and "crossed by an earthen wall thirty to forty feet in thickness" (10–12 m). A "crescent shaped wall" 0.25 to 0.5 miles (400–800 m) to the east of the fortification provided a defense from land attacks. Fort Randolph, a second Confederate stronghold in the area, was constructed only months after Fort Wright, in Fall 1861.

=== Mississippi River campaign ===
Fort Wright was Tennessee's first military training camp in which soldiers could gain experience in the construction of fortifications and the setup of artillery batteries to counter naval attacks. They could undertake defense drills and acquire general military skills and discipline. Soldiers who were trained at Fort Wright fought in battles on different battlefields later in the war, the Battle of Shiloh, the Battle of Belmont, the Battle of Murfreesboro, the Battle of Chickamauga, the Battle of Franklin and the Battle of Bentonville. The Confederate stronghold at Fort Wright was the forwardmost defensive position on the Mississippi River until July 1861. The May 1862 naval Battle of Plum Point Bend was fought on the Mississippi River near Fort Wright. It was abandoned by the Confederate infantry by 1862 but sporadically occupied by other Southern forces during the Civil War.

== Notable people ==
- Nathan Bedford Forrest (1821–1877), Confederate States Army officer
- Alexander P. Stewart (1821–1908), Confederate States Army officer
- Marcus J. Wright (1831–1922), Confederate States Army officer

== See also ==
- List of forts in Tennessee

=== Sources ===
- From an address by General J.R. Charlmers in 1879. "Lieutenant General Nathan Bedford Forrest And His Campaigns". Southern Historical Society Papers, Vol. VII. Richmond, Virginia, October 1879, No. 10. Southern Historical Society Papers.
- Elliot, Sam Davis (2004). Soldier of Tennessee: General Alexander P. Stewart and the Civil War in the West. Baton Rouge, Louisiana: LSU Press. p. 19. ISBN 0-8071-2970-4.
