= List of forts in Tennessee =

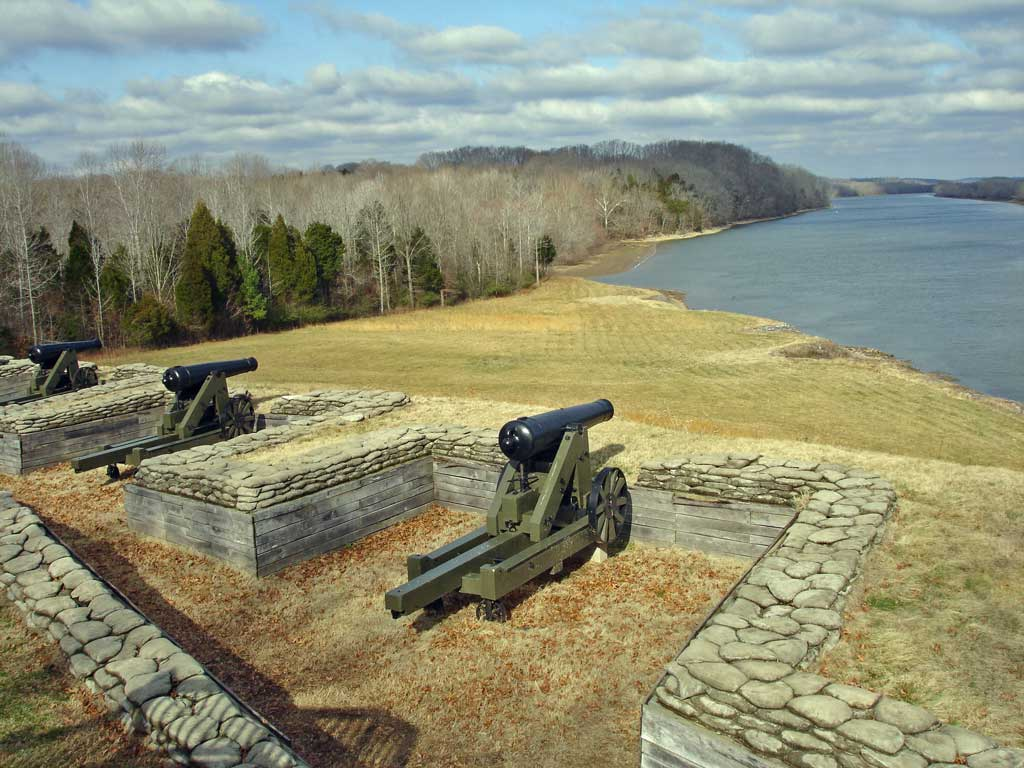
River battery at Fort Donelson

The following is a list of forts in the U.S. state of Tennessee.

== Forts in Tennessee ==
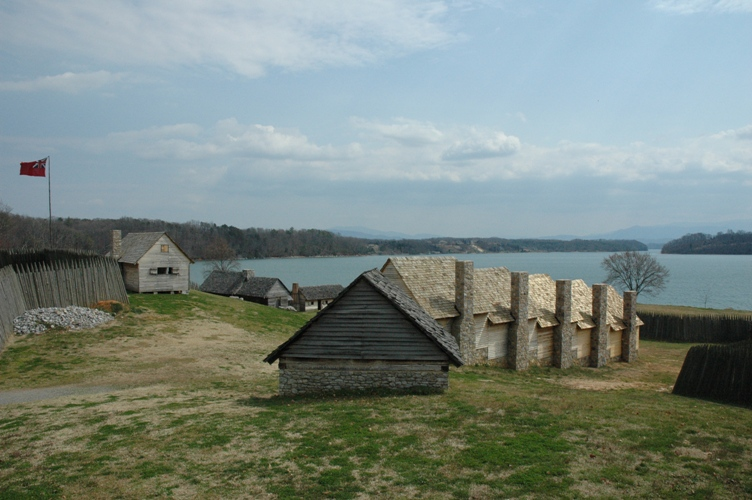
Interior view of Fort Loudoun

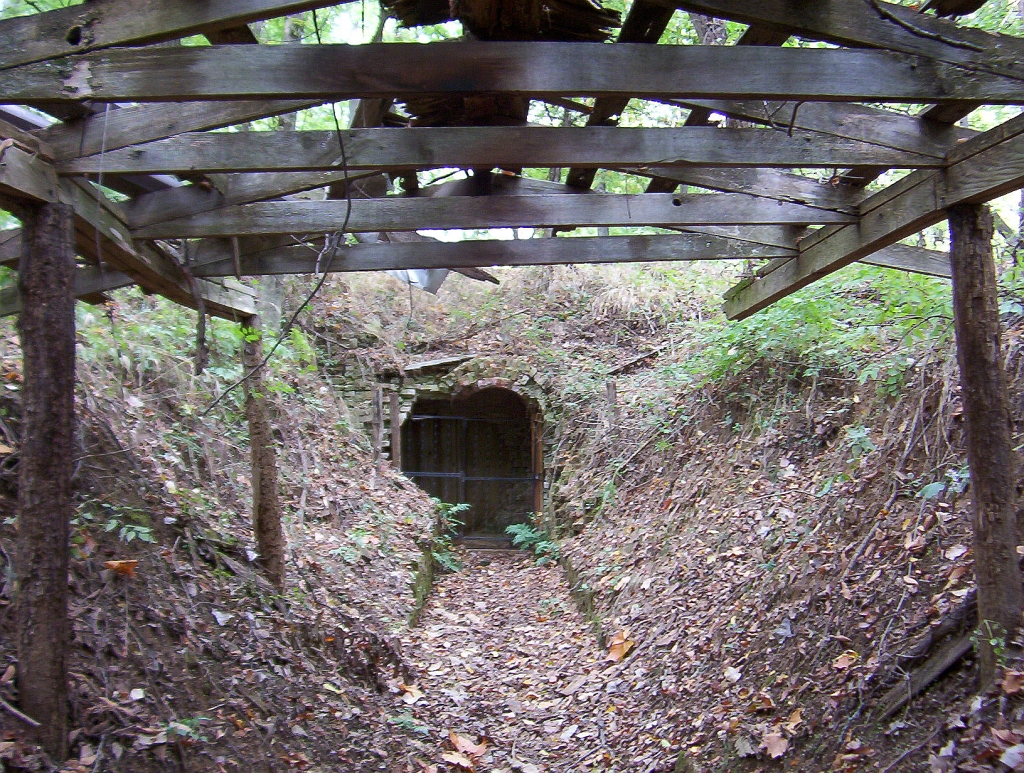
Powder magazine at Fort Wright

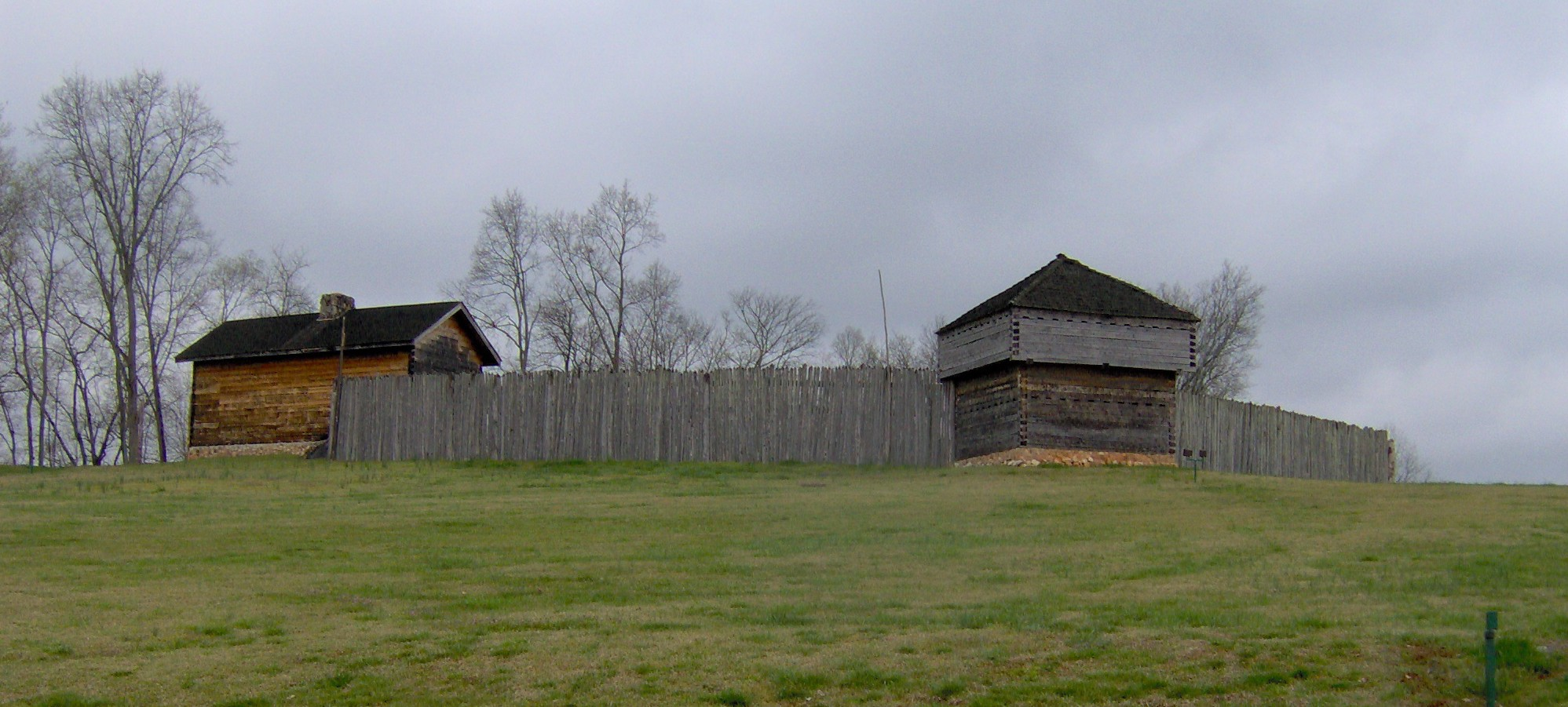
Fort Southwest Point

Name	County	Built	Notes
05Fort Adair	Knox	1788 or 1791	Location unknown, destroyed
10Fort Assumption	Shelby	1739	
15Bledsoe's Fort	Sumner	1781–83	
20Fort Blount	Jackson	1794	Site excavated 1989–1994
20Camp Boone	Montgomery	1861	
25Fort Cass	Bradley	1835	
25Fort Defiance	Montgomery	1861	a multi-million dollar museum and interpretive center construction began 2010.
30Fort Donelson	Stewart	1861	
35Fort Henry	Henry and Stewart	1861	
40Fort Loudoun	Monroe	1756	
45Fort Nash	Coffee	1793	Structure destroyed. Site located on private property.
45Fort Nashborough	Davidson	1781	
50Fort Negley	Davidson	1862	
55Fort Pillow	Lauderdale	1861	
60Fort Prudhomme	Lauderdale, Shelby or Tipton	1682	Location unknown, destroyed
65Fort Randolph	Tipton	1861	Destroyed
70Fort Sanders	Knox	1861	
75Fort Southwest Point	Roane	1797	
80Tellico Blockhouse	Monroe	1794	
85Fort Watauga	Carter	1775	
90White's Fort	Knox	1786	
95Fort Wright	Tipton	1861	Only powder magazine left

== See also ==
- List of international forts
- History of Tennessee
- List of archaeological sites in Tennessee
- Tennessee in the American Civil War
