= Chickasaw Campaign of 1739 =

- Part of the Chickasaw Wars
Date	July 24, 1739 – March 31, 1740
Location	East Arkansas, West Tennessee and Northeast Mississippi
Result	Strategic Chickasaw victory; Negotiated peace

Belligerents
Chickasaw	France

Commanders and leaders
Unknown	(Kingdom of France) Sieur de Bienville

Strength
Perhaps 500 men well fortified	1,200 French regulars and militia, 2,400 Indian warriors, few of whom were engaged

Casualties and losses
Negligible	At least 500 due to sickness

The Chickasaw Campaign of 1739 (July 24, 1739 – March 31, 1740), also known as the Second Chickasaw War, was a continuation of the Chickasaw Wars pursued by the French in Louisiana. In 1739 the French prepared extensively but failed to engage the Chickasaw beyond some half-hearted skirmishing, and finally accepted a negotiated peace.

After the 1736 disasters of Ogoula Tchetoka and Ackia, Upper and Lower Louisiana were still separated by the obstinate Chickasaw. The Choctaw applied relentless pressure by ambushing hunting parties and traffic on the trading path to South Carolina. Alternately, the Choctaw devastated croplands and livestock after using superior numbers to force the Chickasaw into their forts. Under orders, Bienville immediately began to prepare a second grand expedition. Determined to remedy the lack of siege weapons and of coordination that had ruined his first, he obtained artillery, engineers and miners, and more soldiers. He planned for horses, meat on the hoof, forts for staging of men and supplies, and roads to carry the army and its accouterments.

Bienville selected a route up the Mississippi River this time, after receiving assurance from an engineering survey that artillery could be transported overland from there to the Chickasaw villages. A supply depot was built on the western bank of the Mississippi River at the mouth of the St. Francis River. Fort de l'Assumption was built across the Mississippi on the fourth Chickasaw Bluff, at the Margot (present day Wolf) River, to receive men from throughout New France.

Three detachments reached the rendezvous in August 1739: Bienville's nephew Noyan with a vanguard from New Orleans, La Buissionnière from Fort de Chartres with militia and two hundred Illinois, and Céloron with a 'considerable number of Northern Indians' and a company of cadets from Canada. As in 1736 the southern force was slow. Bienville finally arrived in November and reviewed the force which numbered 1200 Europeans and 2400 Indians, roughly twice the men available in 1736.

But the army had already suffered greatly from sickness. To this was added short rations, discontent and desertion during the 'imbecility' of the coming months. 120 miles remained to reach the Chickasaw villages, an easy march for men with rifles, but a different matter for a siege train. As soldiers built carts and wagons, Bienville ruled that the route laid out by the engineer was too low, and that rains had made it impassable. By January 1740 a highland route was blazed, but in the meantime high water interrupted the supply of provisions and the position at Fort de l'Assumption was becoming untenable. Even then the army remained, until in February a council of war decided that they could not march 'without hazarding the reputation of the king's arms'.

Finally, in March, Céloron struck out with his corps of cadets, one hundred regulars, and four or five hundred Indians. Traveling light and following much the same route as d'Artaguette in 1736, this force quickly reached the villages. Céloron allowed his Indians to do what they would, and meanwhile remained open to any offers of peace. After several days of useless skirmishing, negotiations were opened. Suffering under steady Choctaw pressure, and impressed by the massive preparations at Fort de l'Assumption, the Chickasaws had long been giving hints that they would be reasonable. The French demanded that all remaining Natchez be bound over. The Chickasaw replied that most of the Natchez were hunting or had left their lands permanently, but with delivery of several Natchez and French prisoners, peace was confirmed.

The Chickasaw were quiet for several years afterward but continued their trade with the British and had nothing to lose by resuming their aggression. A heavy army with siege equipment could not reach them through the wilderness. A light army could reach them but was useless against their fortified villages.

Bienville lamely claimed victory, and if it were not a victory, at least he had taken all possible precautions. But the expedition had cost more than three times the normal yearly expenses of the entire colony of Louisiana with no visible result. Hundreds of men had been lost to disease - including 500 of the 1200 Europeans at Fort de l'Assumption. The incredible months-long delay there lacks definitive explanation, although internal politics and a reluctance to engage without heavy equipment have been advanced as possible reasons.
