= West Tennessee =

Geographic and cultural region of Tennessee, United States

Coordinates: 35.7°N 89.2°W

- Grand Division
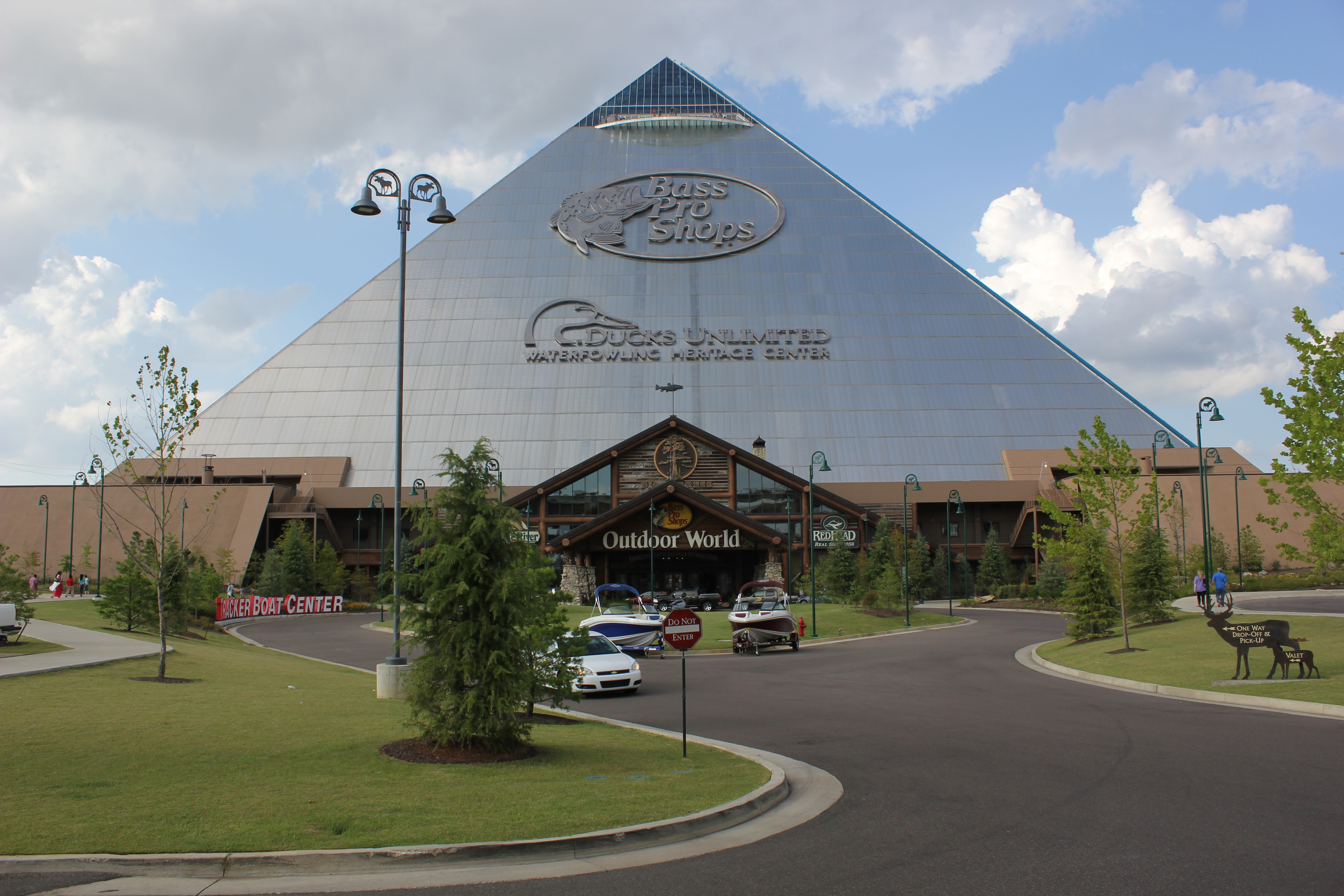
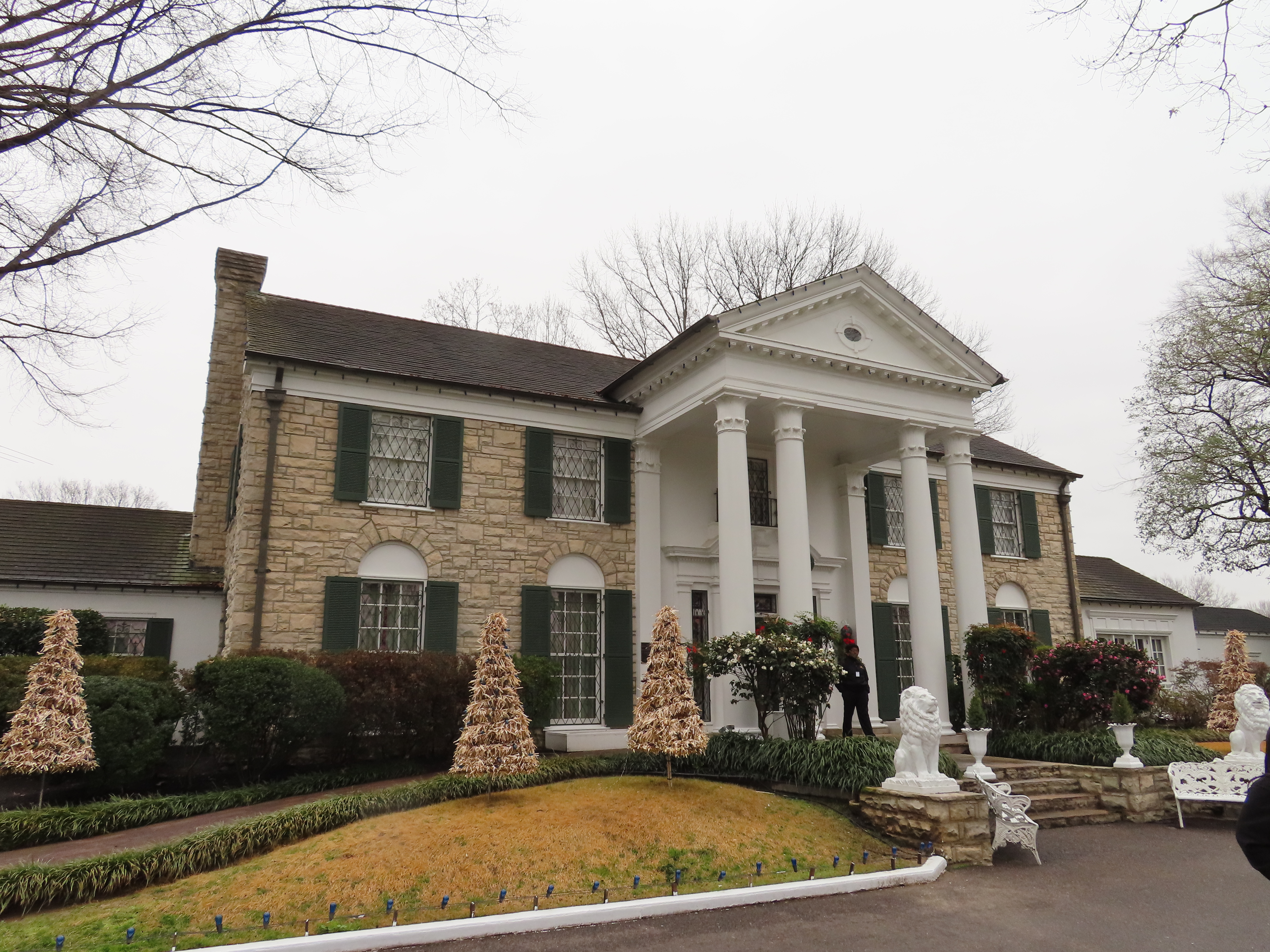
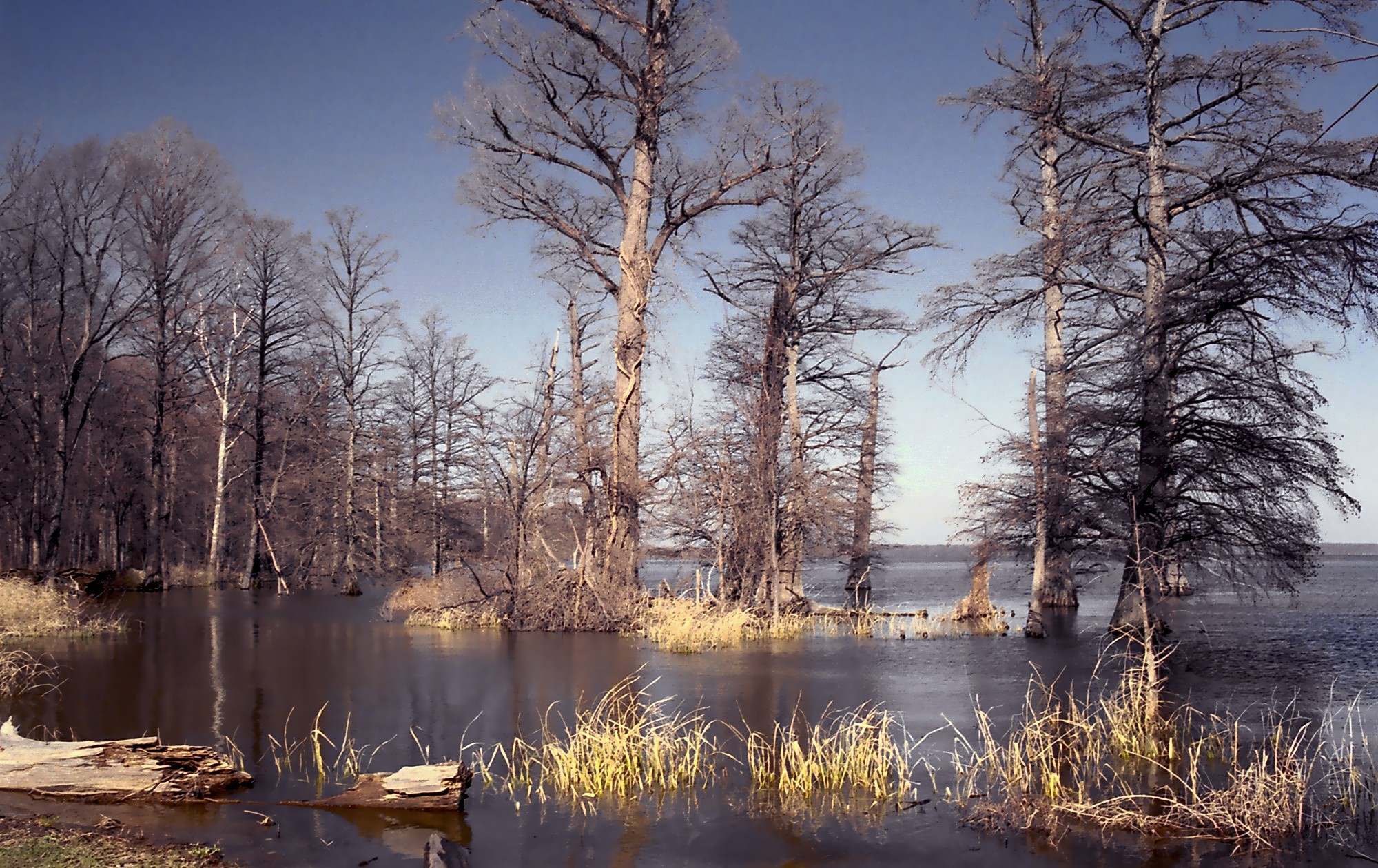
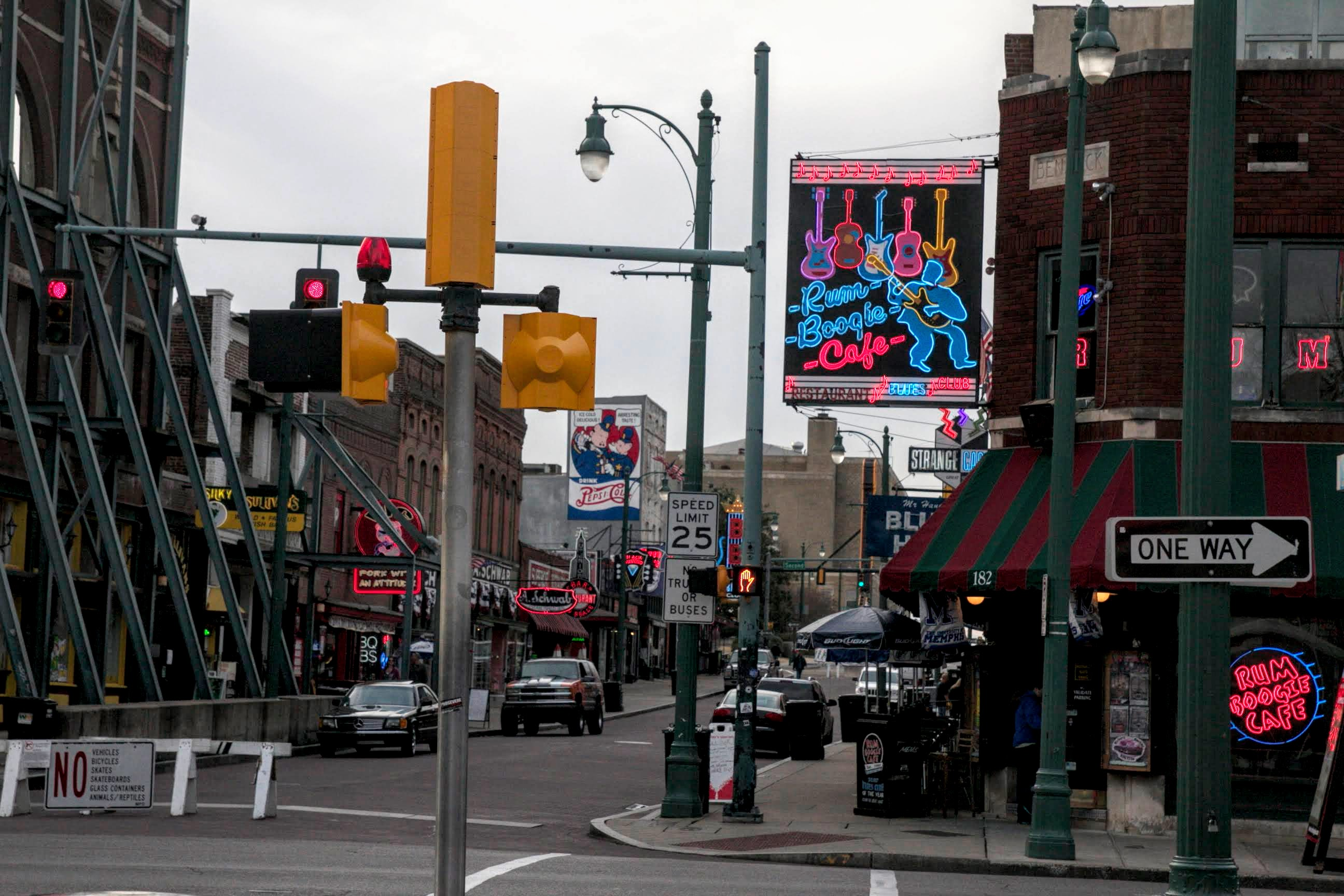
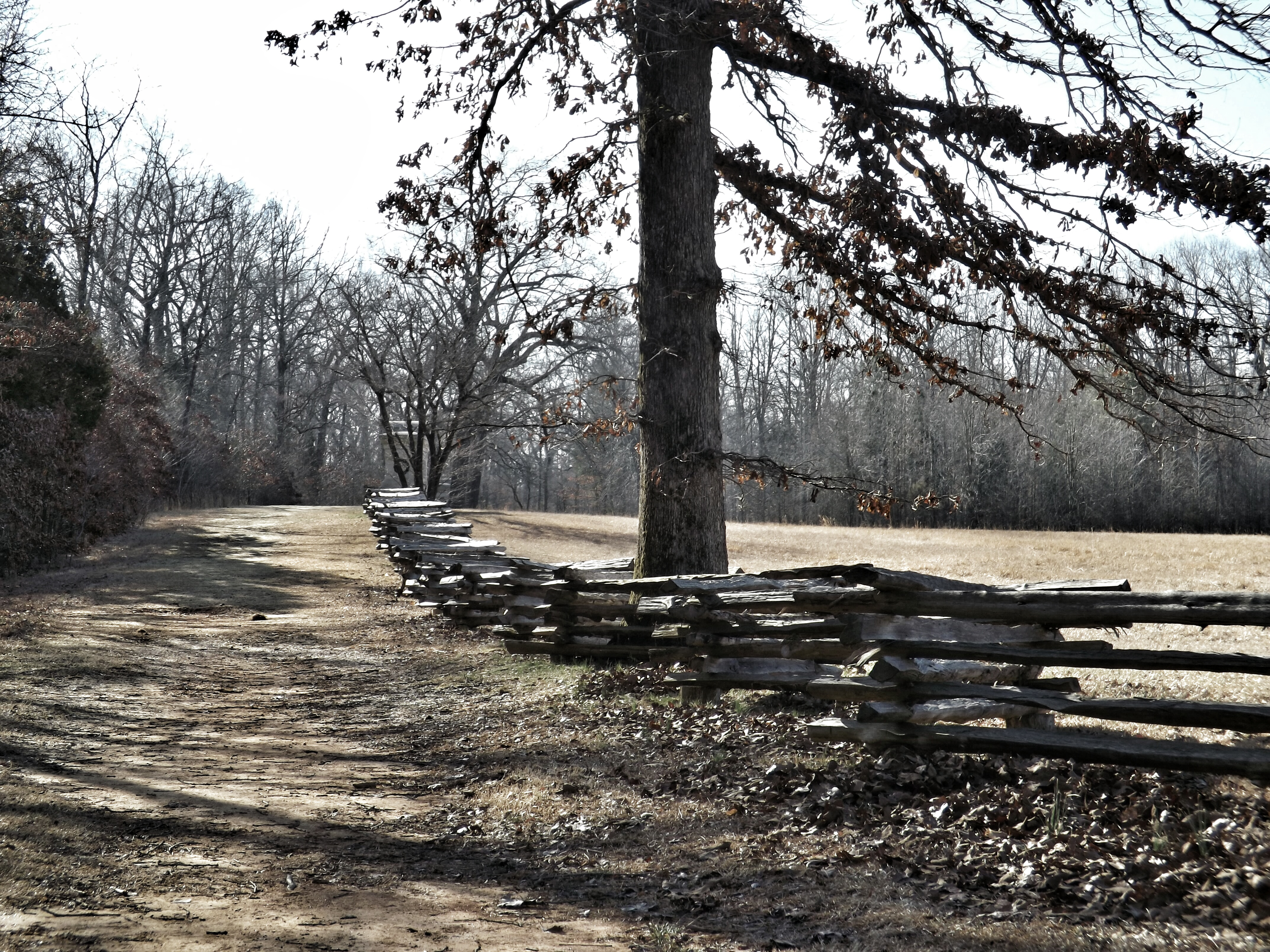
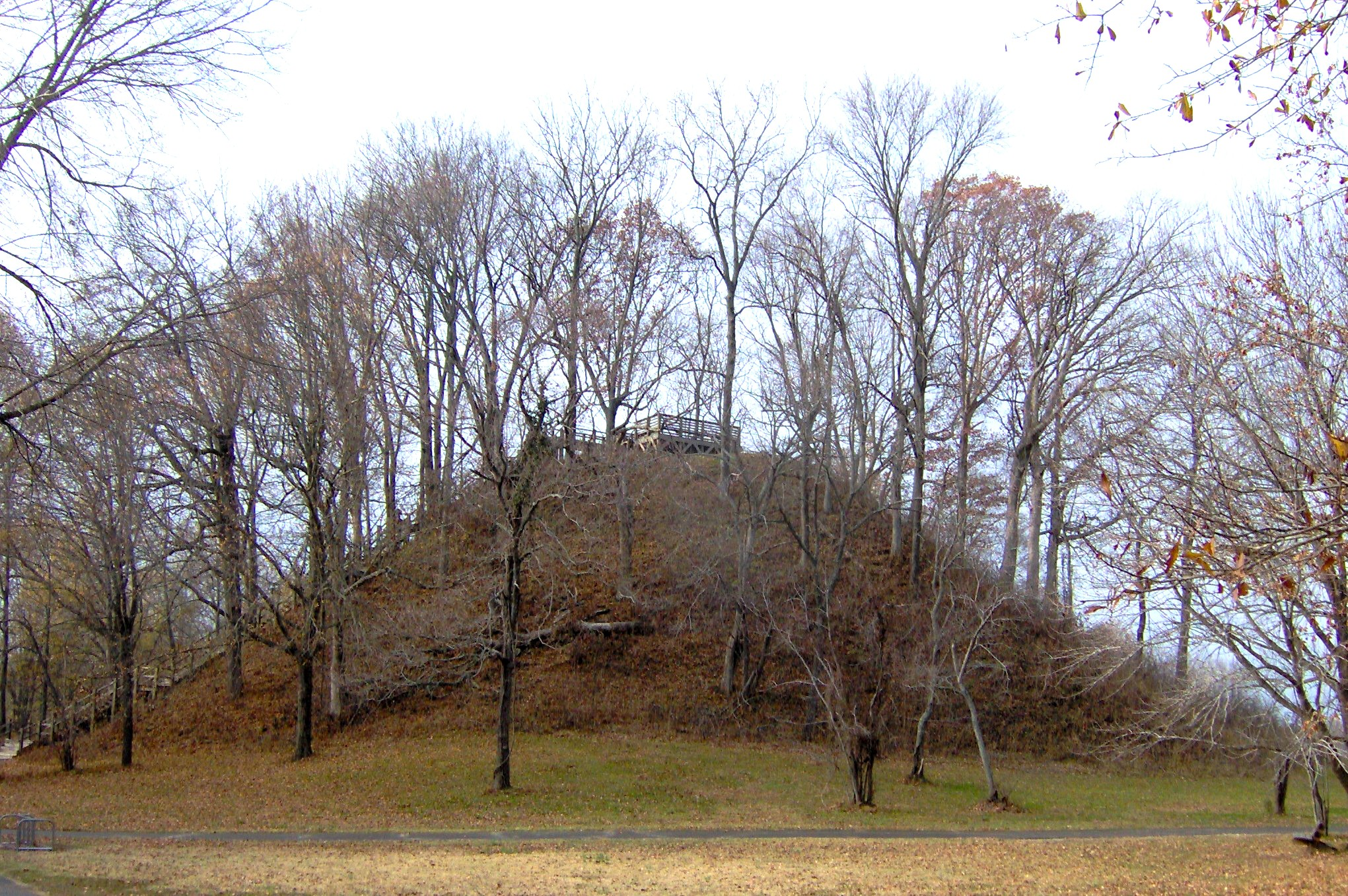
- Clockwise, from top left: The Memphis Pyramid, Graceland, Beale Street, Pinson Mounds, Shiloh National Military Park, Reelfoot Lake
- Nicknames: West TN, West Tenn.
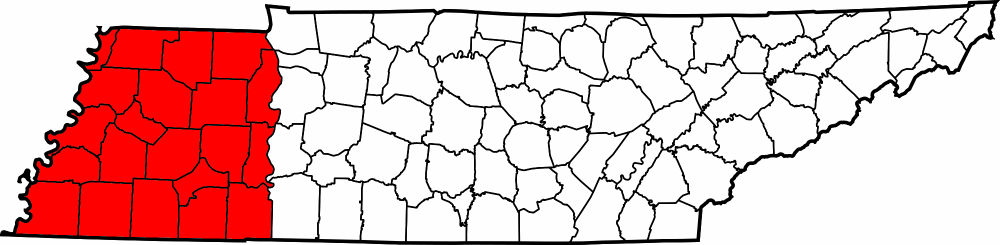
- The counties of Tennessee highlighted in red are designated part of West Tennessee.
- Country: United States
- State: Tennessee
- Largest city: Memphis

Area
  - Land: 10,650 sq mi (27,600 km^{2})

Population (2020)
  - Total: 1,557,649
  - Density: 146.26/sq mi (56.47/km^{2})
- Demonym: West Tennessean

West Tennessee is one of the three Grand Divisions of Tennessee that roughly comprises the western quarter of the state. The region includes 21 counties between the Tennessee and Mississippi rivers, delineated by state law. Its geography consists primarily of flat lands with rich soil and vast floodplain areas of the Mississippi River. Of the three regions, West Tennessee is the most sharply defined geographically, and is the lowest-lying. It is both the least populous and smallest, in land area, of the three Grand Divisions. Its largest city is Memphis, the state's second most populous city.

West Tennessee was originally inhabited by the Chickasaw, and was the last of the three Grand Divisions to be settled by Europeans. The region officially became part of the United States with the Jackson Purchase in 1818, 22 years after Tennessee's statehood. As part of the Mississippi River basin, West Tennessee enjoys rich soil that led to large-scale cotton farming during the antebellum period that was heavily dependent on slave labor. As a result, it forms the northwestern tip of the Black Belt.

== History ==
=== Early history ===
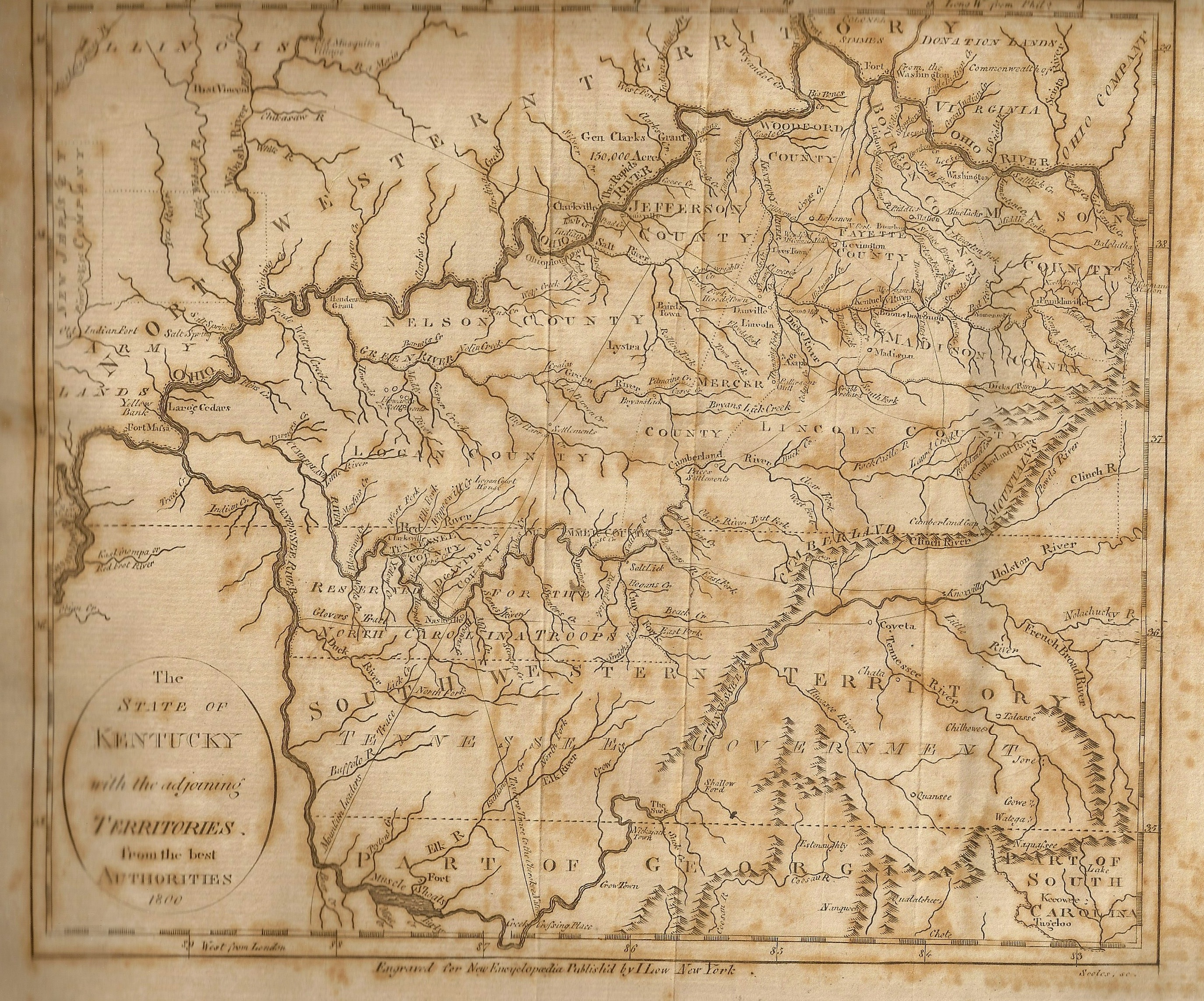
Low's map of Kentucky and neighboring territories did not yet include West Tennessee, controlled by the Chickasaw Nation until 1818. From Low's Encyclopaedia

The first Europeans to reach what is now West Tennessee were part of an expedition led by Spanish explorer Hernando de Soto, who in 1541 became the first Europeans to reach the Mississippi River south of present-day Memphis. In 1673, a French expedition led by missionary Jacques Marquette and Louis Jolliet explored the Mississippi River, becoming the first Europeans to map the Mississippi Valley.

In 1682, a French expedition led by René-Robert Cavelier, Sieur de La Salle constructed Fort Prudhomme on the Chickasaw Bluffs along the Mississippi River north of present-day Memphis. In 1739, the French constructed Fort Assumption under the command of Jean-Baptiste Le Moyne de Bienville on the Mississippi River at the present-day location of Memphis, which they used as a base against the Chickasaw during the 1739 Campaign of the Chickasaw Wars.

In 1795, Spanish Governor-General of Louisiana, Francisco Luis Héctor de Carondelet, sent his lieutenant governor, Manuel Gayoso de Lemos, to negotiate an agreement with the local Chickasaw so that a fort could be erected on the Chickasaw Bluffs in present-day Memphis. Fort San Fernando De Las Barrancas was established in May of that year to defend Spanish claims and prevent further westward expansion of the United States.

The part of Tennessee west of the Tennessee River was first recognized as Chickasaw territory by the 1786 Treaty of Hopewell, and continued to be after Tennessee's statehood in 1796. However, both the state's constitution and the legislative act that admitted Tennessee to the Union defined the region as part of the state. West Tennessee did not come under American control until it was obtained in a series of cessions by the Chickasaw in 1818, an acquisition known as the Jackson Purchase, which was negotiated by Andrew Jackson, who later became the 7th President of the United States, and former-Kentucky governor Isaac Shelby. This purchase also included the westernmost area of Kentucky as well as a part of northern Mississippi.

Although the vast majority of the purchase area lies in Tennessee, the term "Jackson Purchase" is used today mostly to refer solely to the Kentuckian portion of the acquisition. After West Tennessee was opened to European settlement in 1818, cotton planters began exploiting the fertile soils of the region in the 1820s, and an agrarian economy, heavily dependent on African American slave labor took hold in the region. West Tennessee quickly became one of the most productive cotton-producing regions in the nation, along with much of the Deep South and the largest cotton-farming region in Tennessee.

=== Civil War and Reconstruction ===
After the election of Abraham Lincoln as president in 1860, most West Tennesseans favored joining the Confederacy in order to preserve the slavery-based economy of the region. This was true throughout most of West Tennessee, with the exception of the southeastern parts of the region along the Tennessee River, where the terrains and soils did not allow for large plantations as in most of West Tennessee. As a result, most residents of this area were Unionists. In 1860, slaves composed more than one third of West Tennessee's population, compared to about one fourth statewide. This was the highest percentage of the state's three Grand Divisions, although Middle Tennessee had more slaves.

A number of crucial battles and events took place in West Tennessee during the Civil War. In February 1862, the U.S. Navy, under the command of General Ulysses S. Grant, captured the Tennessee River in February 1862 at the Battle of Fort Henry near the Kentucky border. Grant then proceeded south to Pittsburg Landing, and two months later held off a Confederate counterattack, led by Albert Sidney Johnston and P. G. T. Beauregard at the Battle of Shiloh, which was the bloodiest battle of the war at the time. This battle claimed the life of Johnston, and remained one of the most costly engagements of the entire war. Memphis fell to the Union in June after a naval battle on the Mississippi River, which effectively resulted in the Union gaining control of West Tennessee. In an effort to disrupt Grant's campaign southward along the Mississippi River, Confederate General Nathan Bedford Forrest launched a series of offensives into West Tennessee between December 1862 and January 1863, which resulted in Confederate victories in minor battles at Lexington and Jackson, as well as a disputed outcome at Parker's Crossroads. The raids failed to completely stop Grant's movement southward. One of the most notorious events of the war occurred in April 1864 in Lauderdale County, when Confederate troops under Forrest's command massacred hundreds of surrendering Union soldiers, most of whom were Black.

Like most of the South, West Tennessee was greatly devastated by the effects of the Civil War. After the War and during the beginning of Reconstruction, most large cotton plantations were divided into smaller farms. Most freed slaves were forced into sharecropping, and many also worked as agricultural wage laborers. The region was characterized by racial tension between former slaves and their White allies and former Confederates, which often resulted in violence and lynchings perpetrated by the latter, and continued for many decades afterwards. One of the worst acts of racial violence in the Reconstruction era occurred in Memphis in 1866, when White mobs attacked and looted Black neighborhoods in the city, killing 46.

A number of deadly epidemics swept though the region during this time, including yellow fever, which killed more than one-tenth of Memphis' residents in 1878 and caused the city to temporarily lose its charter. Many rural West Tennesseans relocated to Memphis and other cities during the latter 19th century. While the region remained predominantly rural, Memphis experienced modest industrialization, and became known as the "Cotton Capitol of the World" during the late 19th century.

=== 20th century ===
As part of the first wave of the Great Migration, many African American West Tennesseans relocated to industrial cities in the Northeast and Midwest for better economic opportunities and to escape increasing racial segregation imposed by Jim Crow laws passed by the state legislature.

During this time, many West Tennessee residents, Black and White, also relocated from rural areas to Memphis and other cities in the state. Beginning during this time and lasting until the latter 20th century, Memphis experienced an explosive population and economic boom, whereas the population of most West Tennessee counties remained relatively stagnant or declined. Smaller cities such as Jackson and Dyersburg also experienced modest industrialization during this time.

West Tennessee was particularly devastated by the Great Depression, even by national standards. The Tennessee Valley Authority (TVA) played a much lesser role in the region than in the rest of the state, but constructed Pickwick Landing Dam on the Tennessee River in Hardin County, and resulted in the electrification of many rural parts of the region. During World War II, the U.S. Army constructed an ammunition plant in Milan, which also later produced ammunition for the Korean War and Vietnam War. As part of the second wave of the Great Migration, African Americans fled West Tennessee in greater numbers than before, which further exacerbated population decline in rural counties.

In 1960, a number of African American sharecroppers in majority-Black Fayette and Haywood counties were evicted from their lands in retaliation for registering to vote. In response, they formed a makeshift encampment called Tent City with the assistance of Black landowners, which lasted until 1962. On April 4, 1968, civil rights leader Martin Luther King Jr. was assassinated in Memphis by James Earl Ray. King had traveled to Memphis days before to support striking African American sanitation workers. The construction of Interstate 40 through Memphis became a national talking point on the issue of eminent domain and grassroots lobbying when the Tennessee Department of Transportation (TDOT) attempted to construct the highway through the city's Overton Park. A local activist group began fighting the project in 1957, and in 1971, the U.S. Supreme Court sided with the group and established the framework for judicial review of government agencies in the landmark case of Citizens to Preserve Overton Park v. Volpe. The group's efforts eventually resulted in TDOT cancelling the route in 1981.

=== Recent history ===
Since the 1960s, West Tennessee has seen cycles of population booms and stagnation. Agriculture has remained a central tenet of the region's economy, and despite the creation of new economic sectors and employment opportunities, the region has not overall benefitted from these changes as much as the entire state overall.

== Geography ==
West Tennessee is the smallest of the state's three Grand Divisions, and has a land area of approximately 10,650 square miles (27,600 km^{2}), about 25.8% of the state's total land area. The region is bounded by the Mississippi River to the west, and the Tennessee River to the east, except for in Hardin County, which is bisected by the Tennessee River. The region's boundaries have been expanded slightly to include all of this county. The states of Kentucky and Mississippi provide the respective northern and southern boundaries, with the exception of a portion of Lauderdale County, Alabama, which lies southeast of the portion of Hardin County east of the Tennessee River. West Tennessee borders Arkansas and Missouri to the west.

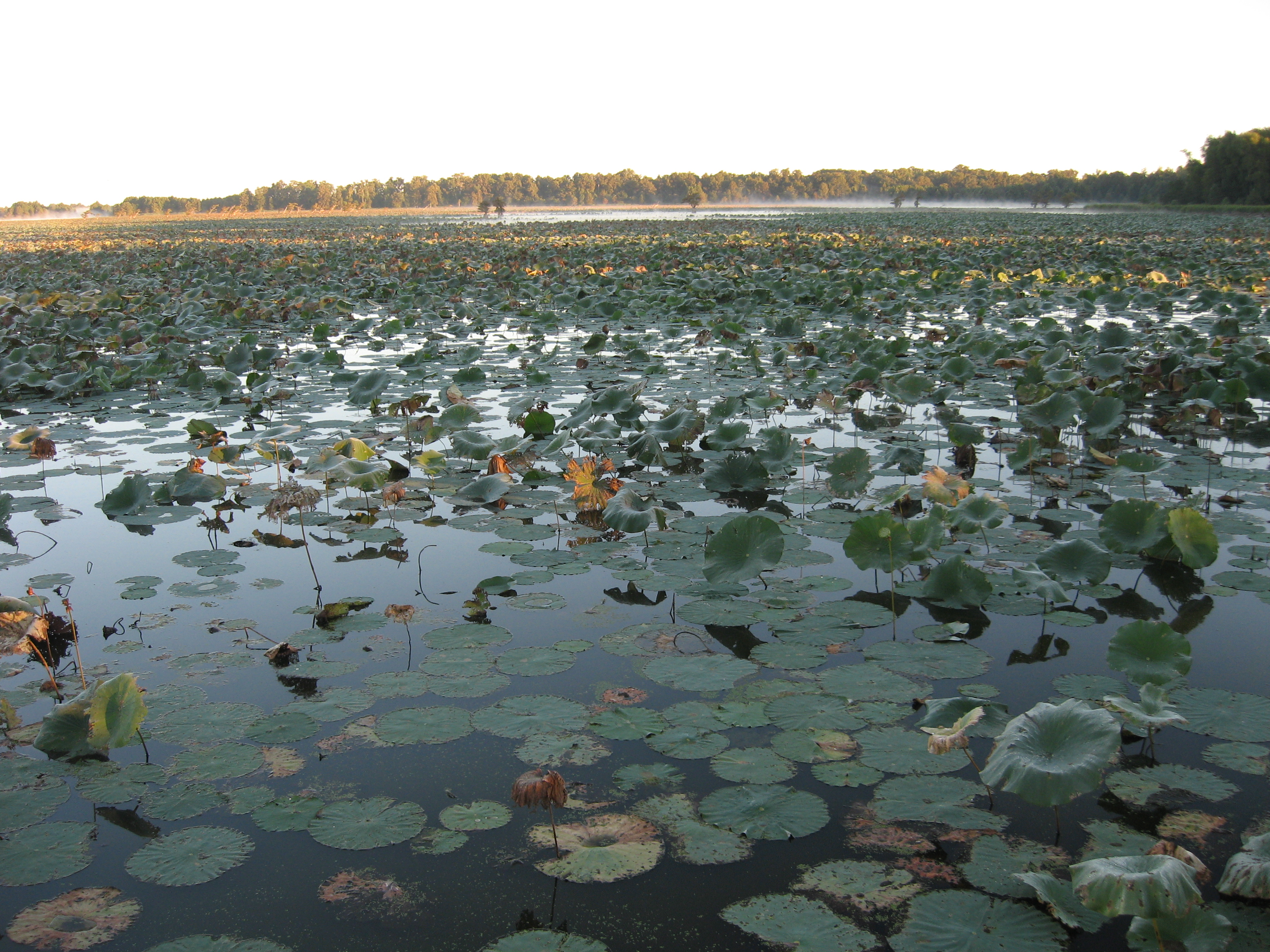
Reelfoot Lake in northwest Tennessee was formed by the 1811–12 New Madrid earthquakes.

West Tennessee is located almost entirely within the Mississippi Embayment, part of the Gulf Coastal Plain. Because of this, the terrain is flatter than the eastern parts of the state. Areas along the Mississippi River are located within the Mississippi Alluvial Plain, which is primarily a floodplain with many swamps. However, much of the western counties of the region are protected from flooding by the Chickasaw Bluffs, ridges of loess rising 50 to 200 feet (15 to 61 m) above the floodplain. Although the land is lower and flatter than Middle and East Tennessee, some hilly terrain exists, especially along the bluffs bordering the Mississippi River and the land bordering the Tennessee River, known as the West Tennessee Highlands. Hilly land in these areas is forested. Otherwise, most of the land in West Tennessee is used as farmland. The soil in this part of the state comes from when a prehistoric sea dried up and left sediment in its place. Unlike in the rest of the state, bedrock is buried a few thousand feet below the surface. West Tennessee's highest elevation is approximately 840 feet (260 m) in Hardin County east of the Tennessee River, which is slightly lower than the state's mean elevation of 900 feet (270 m); the region's highest elevation west of the Tennessee River is approximately 740 feet (230 m) in Chester County. Tennessee's lowest point can be found in West Tennessee; it is located at the extreme southwestern most part of Shelby County where the Mississippi River enters into Mississippi and continues in Arkansas. This point is 178 feet (54 m) according to the USGS, but fluctuates with river levels.

=== Hydrology ===
Several rivers and streams, besides the Mississippi and Tennessee, exist in West Tennessee. All of them were originally slowly moving swamps or low-gradient meandering streams before nearly all of them were channelized in the 20th century. Rivers that empty into the Mississippi River include the Obion River, Forked Deer River, Hatchie River (which has not been channelized), Loosahatchie River, Wolf River, and Nonconnah Creek. Rivers that empty into the Tennessee River include the Big Sandy River and Beech River.

West Tennessee sits on top of an artesian aquifer. This aquifer is the main source of water for Memphis and Shelby County, as well as many other communities. In the Memphis area and areas along the bluffs, the loess and gravel serves as a cap over the sand making up the aquifer. The rest of West Tennessee serves as a recharge area for the aquifer. This aquifer provides some of the cleanest water in the United States.

=== Seismology ===
The entire West Tennessee region, especially the area closest to the Mississippi River, lies in a zone of fairly high estimated risk for earthquakes. This area is at the edge of the New Madrid Seismic Zone. In 1811 and 1812, three of the largest quakes in American history hit this region when it had few European settlers. By some reports, the earthquakes briefly reversed the flow of the Mississippi River. A lasting legacy of the earthquakes is the Reelfoot Lake, a large but shallow body of water in northwestern Tennessee that was created by the earthquakes.

=== Counties ===
There are 21 counties in West Tennessee:

- Benton
- Carroll
- Chester
- Crockett
- Decatur
- Dyer
- Fayette
- Gibson
- Hardeman
- Hardin
- Haywood
- Henderson
- Henry
- Lake
- Lauderdale
- Madison
- McNairy
- Obion
- Shelby
- Tipton
- Weakley

=== Cities ===
Cities and towns with 10,000+ population (2020 Census)

Seven of the thirteen cities in West Tennessee with a population greater than 10,000 are located within Shelby County, which comprises Memphis and its six suburbs.

- Memphis (633,104)
- Jackson (68,205)
- Bartlett (57,786)
- Collierville (51,324)
- Germantown (41,333)
- Dyersburg (16,164)
- Arlington (14,549)
- Lakeland (13,904)
- Union City (11,170)
- Martin (10,825)
- Millington (10,582)
- Paris (10,316)
- Atoka (10,008)

== Demographics ==
Historical population
Census	Pop.	Note	%±
1820	1,852		—
1830	103,774		5,503.3%
1840	185,822		79.1%
1850	259,141		39.5%
1860	304,309		17.4%
1870	367,567		20.8%
1880	451,408		22.8%
1890	515,640		14.2%
1900	602,015		16.8%
1910	648,439		7.7%
1920	694,721		7.1%
1930	787,997		13.4%
1940	857,884		8.9%
1950	977,980		14.0%
1960	1,082,210		10.7%
1970	1,191,749		10.1%
1980	1,312,464		10.1%
1990	1,359,225		3.6%
2000	1,499,803		10.3%
2010	1,562,641		4.2%
2020	1,557,649		−0.3%
Source: 1910–2020

West Tennessee is by slight amounts less populous and smaller in land area than the other two Grand Divisions. At the 2020 census, West Tennessee had 1,557,649 inhabitants living in its 21 counties, a decrease of 4,992, or 0.32%, over the 2010 figure of 1,562,650. This was the first recorded net population decrease in any of the state's three Grand Divisions in history. West Tennessee's population was about 22.54% of the state's total, and its population density was about 146.26 inhabitants per square mile (56.47/km^{2}). About 60% of the population of West Tennessee resides in Shelby County.

West Tennessee registered a population growth rate significantly below the state and national average (11.5% and 9.7% respectively) from 2000 to 2010, significantly less than that of Middle and East Tennessee (18.0% and 10.4%). West Tennessee's population grew only 4.2% during the 10-year period; predominantly black Haywood County was the most rapidly diminishing county in the state, losing 5.1% of its population. Only three counties (Chester, Fayette, and Tipton, all increasingly playing a role as bedroom suburbs of metropolitan areas) recorded a growth rate of more than 10% from 2000 to 2010. Many West Tennessee counties are not on the state's major transportation routes (railroads or highways) and have no air transport to speak of; and rely heavily on agriculture. With fewer farms and farmers, and the continuing decline of manufacturing, economic opportunities diminish in these counties, and young residents look outside the area for jobs, leading to substantial out-migration. Thus, the population in West Tennessee is increasingly older, with median ages above the state average in most counties; and the over-65 age group constitutes a larger percentage of the total population than the state average, leading in turn to a below-replacement-rate birth/death ratio, and economic decline, including empty and neglected housing and business structures.

== Economy ==
Agriculture plays the largest role in the economy of West Tennessee out of all of the state's Grand Divisions, and is arguably still the region's largest economic sector. Tennessee ranks seventh in the nation in the production of cotton, nearly all of which is grown in West Tennessee. The northern half of West Tennessee also produces more corn and soybeans than any other region in the state. Other important agricultural commodities cultivated in the region include beef cattle, sorghum, wheat, poultry, and timber and forestry products.

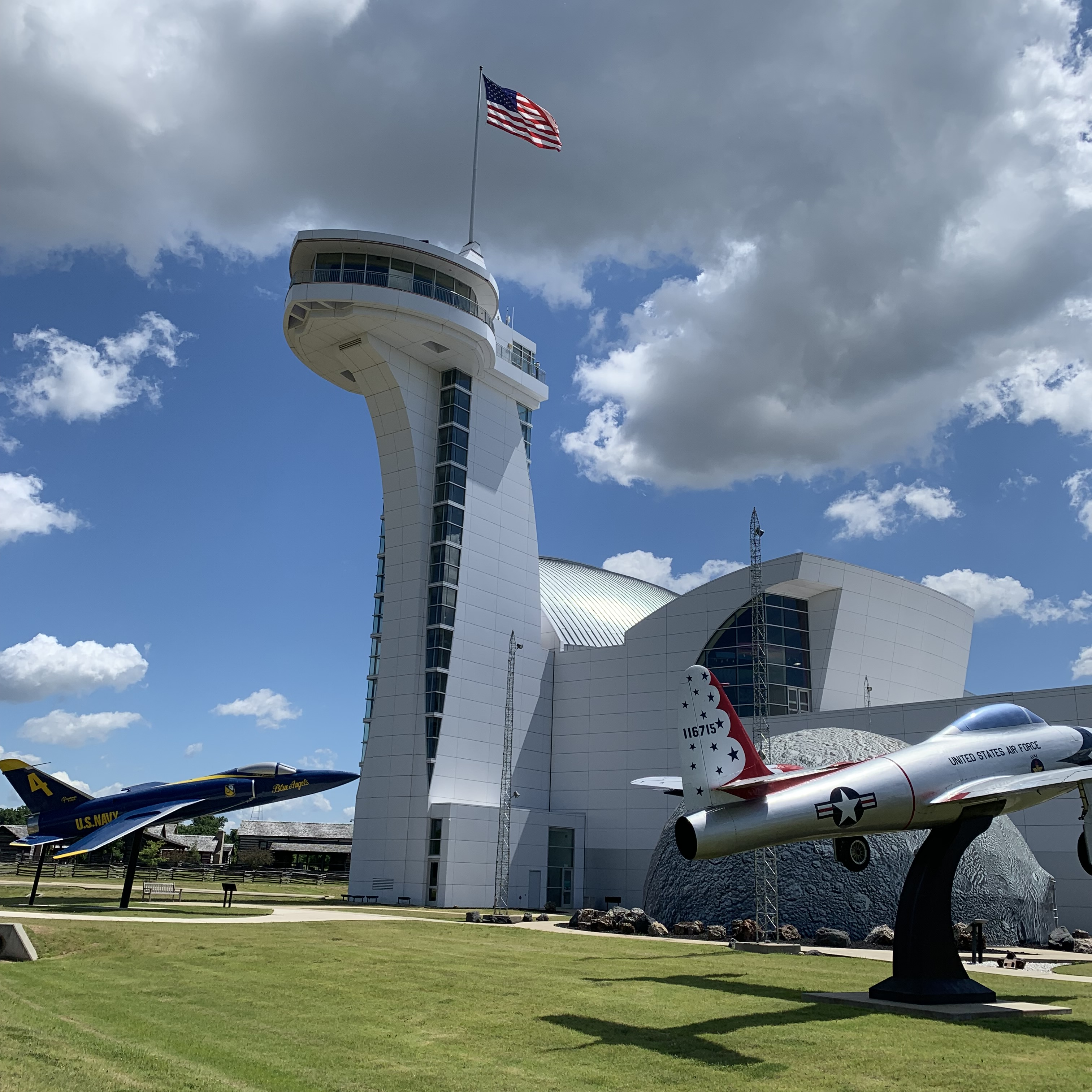
Discovery Park of America in Union City

West Tennessee is home to manufacturing establishments which produce such products as automotive components, chemicals, electronics, appliances, and fabricated metal products. On September 27, 2021, it was announced that Ford and SK Innovation would construct a complex at the Memphis Regional Megasite near Stanton called "Blue Oval City" to manufacture electric vehicles and batteries. The facility, which is expected to be operational in 2025, will cost approximately $5.6 billion, making it the most expensive single investment in state history, and employ approximately 5,700. Large corporations based in the region include FedEx, International Paper, First Horizon Corporation, and AutoZone, all based in Memphis. Tourism also plays a major role in the region's economy, especially attractions related to its musical heritage. Major attractions include Graceland, the home of Elvis Presley, Beale Street, Sun Studio, the National Civil Rights Museum, the Memphis Zoo, and the Stax Museum of American Soul Music, all in Memphis; the Casey Jones Home & Railroad Museum in Jackson, the West Tennessee Delta Heritage Center/Tina Turner Museum in Brownsville, and Discovery Park of America in Union City. The National Park Service operates Shiloh National Military Park, and Fort Donelson National Battlefield in West Tennessee.

== Politics ==
West Tennessee vote by party in presidential elections
Year	GOP	DEM	Others
2024	53.36% 317,003	45.25% 268,833	1.39% 8,236
2020	49.43% 324,415	49.06% 321,952	1.51% 9,889
2016	48.93% 282,939	47.82% 276,474	3.25% 18,802
2012	47.9% 293,350	52.1% 318,513
2008	46.00% 306,583	53.15% 354,262	0.85% 5,690

Historically, West Tennessee was predominately Democratic following the American Civil War, but the significant minority of African Americans joined the Republican Party. The white-dominated state legislature in the 1880s passed four laws that effectively disenfranchised most blacks and many poor whites, particularly due to the requirement of payment of a poll tax in order to register to vote, which reduced the competitiveness of the Republican Party in this part of the state.

=== Government ===
West Tennessee is represented by part of the 7th district, and all of the 8th and 9th districts. The 7th district covers Benton, Decatur, Henderson, Hardeman, Chester, McNairy, and Hardin counties. The 8th district represents the remaining counties except for Memphis and Millington, which are represented by the 9th district.

The Supreme Court building for West Tennessee is in Jackson. Similar rules apply to certain other state commissions and boards, as well, to prevent them from showing any geographical biases.

== Area codes ==
Until the year 2001, West Tennessee, including all of Hardin County, was in the area code 901. After a large amount of population growth necessitated two area codes for West Tennessee, Memphis, its northern and eastern suburbs, as well as Fayette and Tipton counties, retained the 901 area code, with the remainder of West Tennessee being placed into area code 731. The Memphis area is one of the largest metropolitan areas that does not require 10-digit dialing, and it is anticipated it will remain this way for many years to come.

== Transportation ==
=== Roads and highways ===
Interstate 40 (I-40) is West Tennessee's primary interstate highway, which runs for 134 miles (216 km) from the Mississippi River in Memphis and crosses the Tennessee River in Benton County, passing near Brownsville and through Jackson in between. Interstate 240 (I-240) is an auxiliary bypass route of I-40 that runs to the south of Memphis. Interstate 55 (I-55) runs for 13 miles (21 km), entirely within southwest Memphis, from the Mississippi state line to the Mississippi River. I-155 is located in the northwestern part of West Tennessee, running from the Mississippi River to Dyersburg. I-269 serves as an outer bypass around Memphis, passing to the east of the city. An extension of I-69 is proposed to run from the Mississippi state line in Memphis to the Kentucky line near South Fulton. The U.S. Highways that travel through West Tennessee are:

- U.S. Route 45
- U.S. Route 51
- U.S. Route 61
- U.S. Route 64
- U.S. Route 70
- U.S. Route 72
- U.S. Route 78
- U.S. Route 79
- U.S. Route 412
- U.S. Route 641

=== Rail transport ===
Freight railways crisscross West Tennessee. Norfolk Southern maintains a line running through the southern counties from Memphis to the shoals area of Alabama. They also maintain a line which runs from South Fulton through Martin, Milan, Jackson, and Selmer crossing into Mississippi. Canadian National runs a line from South Fulton, through Union City, Dyersburg and Memphis. From here the line splits into two: one runs through the Mississippi Delta and the other one runs through the center of Mississippi. BNSF runs through Memphis from Mississippi to downtown Memphis, crossing the River on the Frisco Bridge. Union Pacific maintains a short line through Memphis crossing the river on the Harahan Bridge and connects with other lines in the area. CSX runs a line from Memphis through Memphis, Brownsville, Humboldt, Milan, McKenzie, and Camden, then crossing the Tennessee River. Many other short line railroads exist scattered throughout the region.

There are three intermodal facilities around the Memphis area. One is operated by Norfolk Southern in Rossville, one operated by BNSF in Southeast Memphis, and one operated by Canadian National in Southwest Memphis.

Amtrak runs the City of New Orleans passenger rail service along the CN rail line. There are two stops in West Tennessee along this route, which are in Downtown Memphis at Central Station and in Newbern north of Dyersburg.

=== Airports ===
West Tennessee has one international airport, Memphis International Airport (MEM). Because it is the hub for FedEx, it is the busiest freight airport in the world. West Tennessee also has two important regional airports. McKellar-Sipes Regional Airport (MKL) is located outside of Jackson and Dyersburg Regional Airport (DYR) is southwest of Dyersburg. In addition to these, several general aviation exist along with two former military airstrips. Arnold Field in Lauderdale County maintains an airstrip and Millington Regional Jetport serves as a backup landing strip for FedEx.

== Universities and colleges ==
The public universities and colleges in West Tennessee are the University of Memphis, the University of Tennessee at Martin, Dyersburg State Community College, Jackson State Community College, Southwest Tennessee Community College, and the University of Tennessee Health Science Center in Memphis, which has state medical, dental, nursing, and pharmacy schools, as well as a graduate program in health sciences. The University of Memphis has a branch campus in Jackson after taking over the former Lambuth University campus.

Private institutions of higher education located in the region include Christian Brothers University, LeMoyne–Owen College, Rhodes College, Union University, Lane College, Bethel University, and Freed-Hardeman University.
