= Chickasaw Campaign of 1736 =

French defeat in the present day Mississippi

- Part of the Chickasaw Wars
Date	February 28 – March 25, 1736
Location	West Tennessee and Northeast Mississippi
Result	Chickasaw victory

Belligerents
Chickasaw	France

Commanders and leaders
Mingo Ouma	(Kingdom of France) Pierre d'Artaguette

Strength
Perhaps 200 Chickasaw, and some Natchez warriors, a few British fur traders	130 French regulars and militia, of which 30 were left behind to guard supplies; 38 Iroquois; 28 Quapaw; and 300 Miami and Illinois warriors

Casualties and losses
Reportedly 50 casualties	Most of the French killed or captured, Iroquois and Quapaw heavily engaged

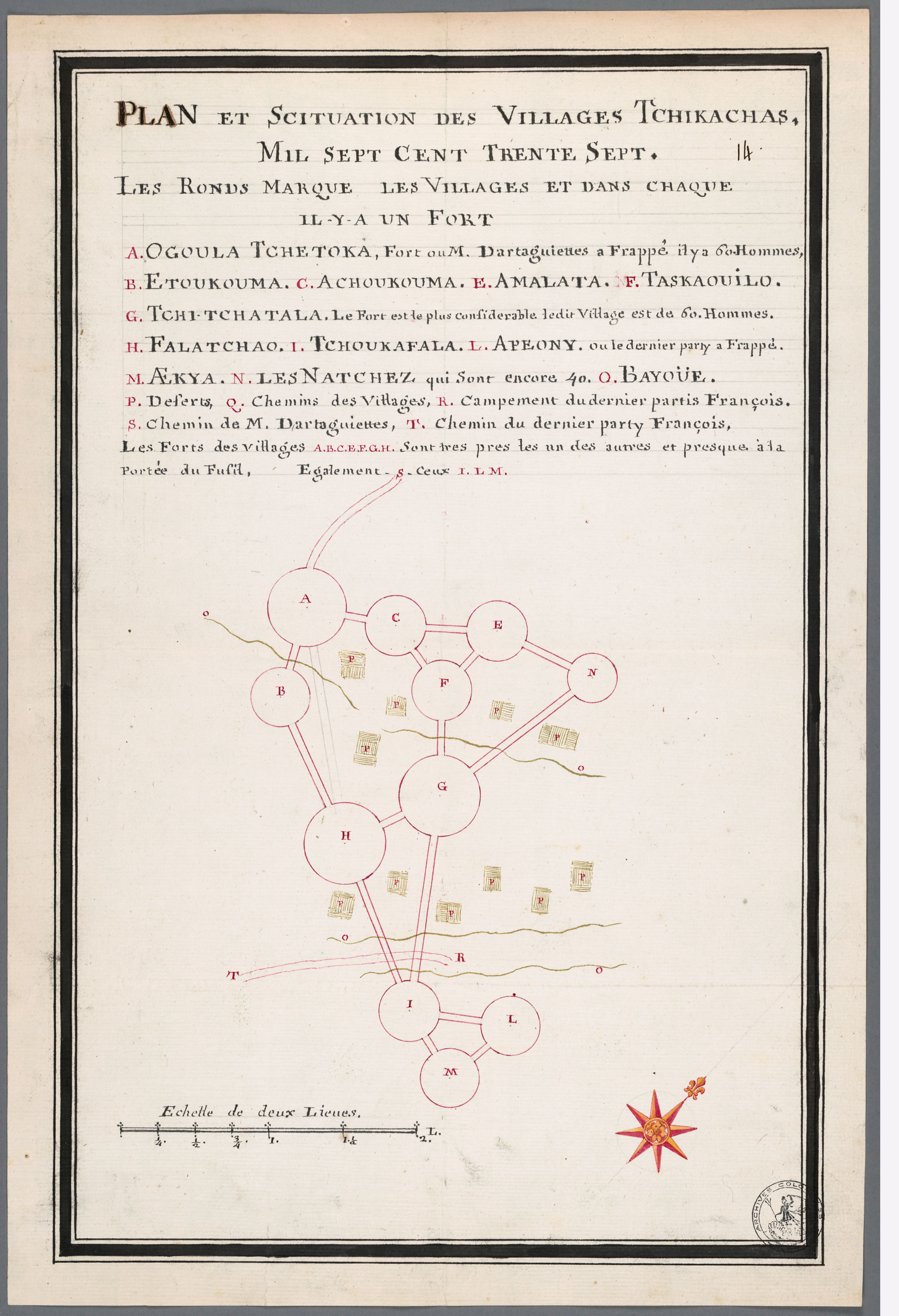
Villages attacked in 1736. French copy of a map made in the Indian style

The Chickasaw Campaign of 1736 (February 28 – March 25, 1736), also known as the First Chickasaw War, consisted of two pitched battles by the French and allies against Chickasaw fortified villages in present-day Northeast Mississippi. Under the overall direction of the governor of Louisiana, Jean-Baptiste Le Moyne de Bienville, a force from Upper Louisiana attacked Ogoula Tchetoka on March 25, 1736. A second force from Lower Louisiana attacked Ackia on May 26, 1736. Both attacks were bloodily repulsed (see Atkinson, 2004).

== Strategic situation ==
The French empire of New France extended from New Orleans in the south to Canada in the north. Its unity was disrupted only by the presence of hostile Natchez and Chickasaw tribes in the lower Mississippi River valley. The French effort to reduce these hostile tribes and gain free passage along the Mississippi culminated in the Chickasaw Wars.

Since 1716, the French and Choctaw had united against the Natchez in an overt campaign of destruction. By 1736, the Natchez were killed or scattered, with many of them taking refuge among the Chickasaw. Bienville wanted to destroy these Natchez remnants, and reduce the Chickasaw: 'It is absolutely necessary that some bold and remarkable blow be struck, to impress the Indians with a proper sense of respect and duty toward us.' He planned coordinated operations by two forces: one under Pierre d'Artaguette, commander of the Illinois District of Louisiana, from the North; and a larger army under himself from the South. These forces were to meet 'at the Chickasaw villages' on March 31, 1736.

== Battle of Ogoula Tchetoka ==
D'Artaguette at Fort de Chartres collected detachments throughout the Illinois Country and proceeded with great expedition to Chickasaw Bluff at present-day Memphis. Despite failing to meet promised detachments under de Monchervaux and de Grandpré, he resumed his march with Chicagou and de Vincennes to the Chickasaw lands, only to be advised by courier that the southern army was late and that he should act according to his own judgement.

Unable or unwilling to wait any longer, d'Artaguette arrived before a seemingly isolated village at Ogoula Tchetoka (part of Chuckalissa, or Old Town in present-day northwest Tupelo, Mississippi) with 130 French regulars and militia and 366 Iroquois, Quapaw, Miami, and Illinois warriors. The day was 'Palm Sunday', March 25. Leaving 30 French behind to guard supplies, d'Artaguette's northern force attacked with 'great vigor' but was pinned down, routed, and furiously pursued, and its baggage train of valuable shot and powder was captured. Surviving remnants scattered back to meet the belated de Monchervaux on the return trail; Bienville wrote that, without the firm resistance given by the Iroquois and Quapaw, not a single Frenchman would have survived. According to French reports, twenty-one of the French were captured of whom nineteen, including d'Artaguette thrice wounded in battle, were executed by burning, some of whom were already dead when thrown into large fires. Two Frenchmen were held in hope of exchange for an imprisoned Chickasaw chief, but were eventually sent to the British in South Carolina.

A contemporary memoir by Dumont de Montigny mistakenly reported this battle as taking place on May 20, 1736, leading to confusion in many later accounts.

== Battle of Ackia ==
Battle of Ackia
- Part of the Chickasaw Wars
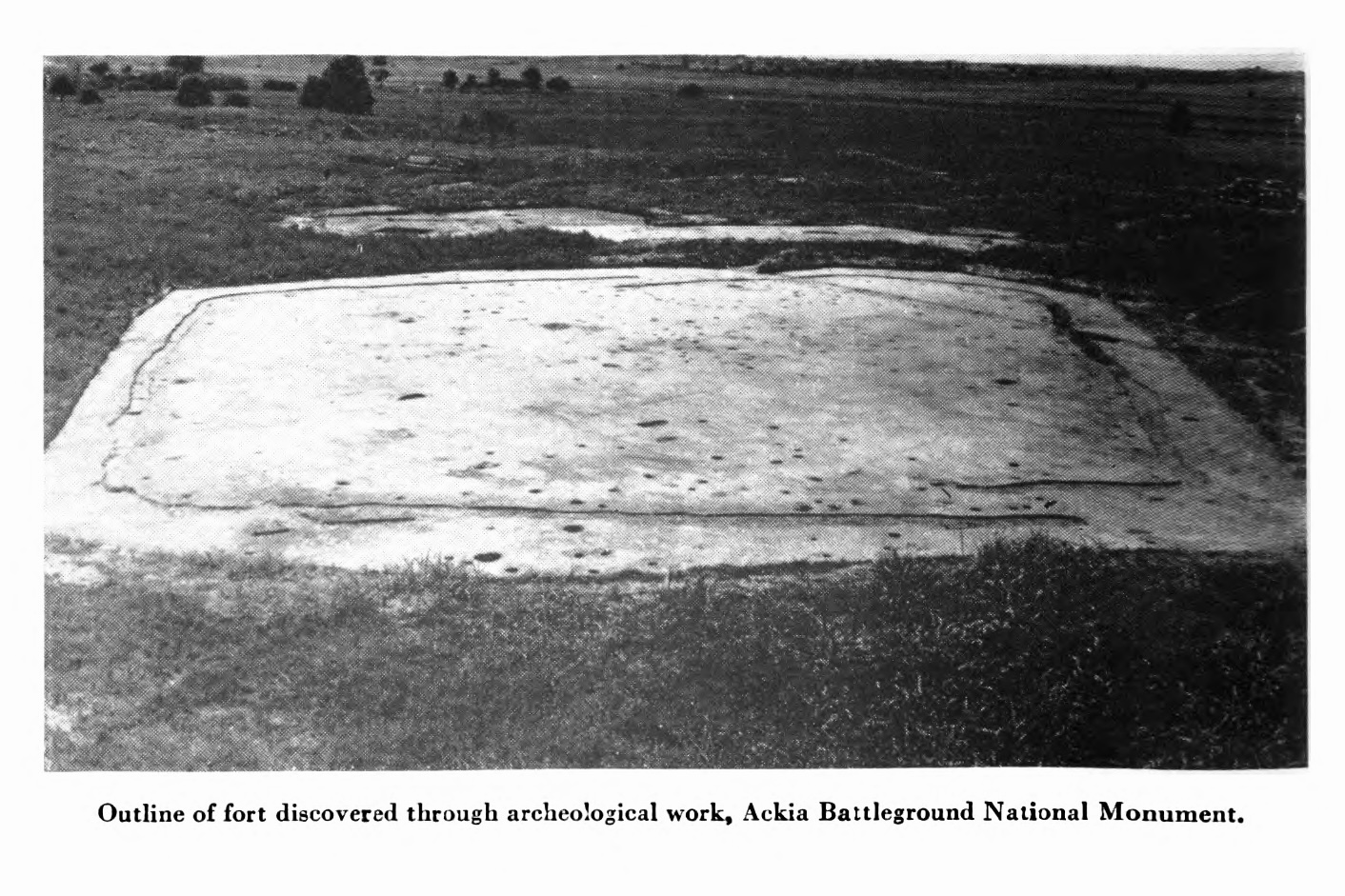
- Outline of fort discovered during archeological work, Ackia Battleground National Monument, photographed c. 1938 during Natchez Trace Parkway survey
Date	26 May 1736
Location	in present-day south Tupelo, Mississippi, US
Result	Decisive Chickasaw victory

Belligerents
Chickasaw nation	French in Lower Louisiana

Commanders and leaders
Mingo Ouma	Sieur de Bienville

Strength
Reportedly 100 Chickasaw warriors, roughly two dozen Englishmen, all within fortifications	544 European regulars and militia excluding officers, 45 Africans, 600 Choctaw warriors

Casualties and losses
very few	Roughly 100 French killed, 100 French wounded, at least 22 Choctaw killed

Ackia (in present-day south Tupelo, Mississippi) was attacked by the Southern force. The French contingent, including grenadiers, regulars, Swiss, and various companies of militia, assembled at Mobile throughout March 1736. Starting the first of April, the French proceeded by boat with little loss 270 river miles up the Tombigbee River. On April 23, the army reached its forward depot at Fort Tombecbé (which had been prepared at present-day Jones Bluff, Sumter County, Alabama, in anticipation of this campaign), and there mustered 544 European and 45 African men, excluding officers, before being met up-river by a 600 man Choctaw contingent. Departing Fort Tombecbé on May 4 by boat and on foot, the combined army continued upriver and reached the vicinity of present-day Amory, Mississippi, on May 22. Quickly fortifying a base camp to protect the supplies and boats, essential for its return, the army departed on May 24 for the nearest Chickasaw village, located about 20 miles across the prairie to the northwest.

On May 26, the army approached three fortified hilltop villages, named Ackia, Tchoukafalaya, and Apeony, collectively called Long Town. As the villages came into view it became apparent that a British flag flew over one of them. As they got closer the French saw a number of Englishmen among the Chickasaws. After this discovery, the Chevalier de Noyan, Bienville's nephew, urged an immediate attack. After some debate the army advanced to attack, with the French contingent in typically European order, and the Choctaw noisily but reluctantly covering the flanks. Avoiding Apeony, where a trader's cabin flew a British flag, the force stormed Ackia under cover of large shields or mats called mantelets. The French immediately received 'a shower of balls' from the Chickasaw fortifications, and the mantelets proved to be ineffective. The attack became pinned down on the side of the hill with steadily mounting casualties. Several outlying cabins were taken, but after several hours' combat the French fell back 'without having been able to make the slightest breach' in the fortress at the point of attack. During the night the Chickasaws further improved their position by razing surrounding cabins and vegetation. The French, short of ammunition and provisions, and worried that they could not carry any more wounded, and with no information from d'Artaguette, retreated the way they came having lost roughly two hundred men (roughly 100 killed and 100 wounded) in an ultimately futile campaign.

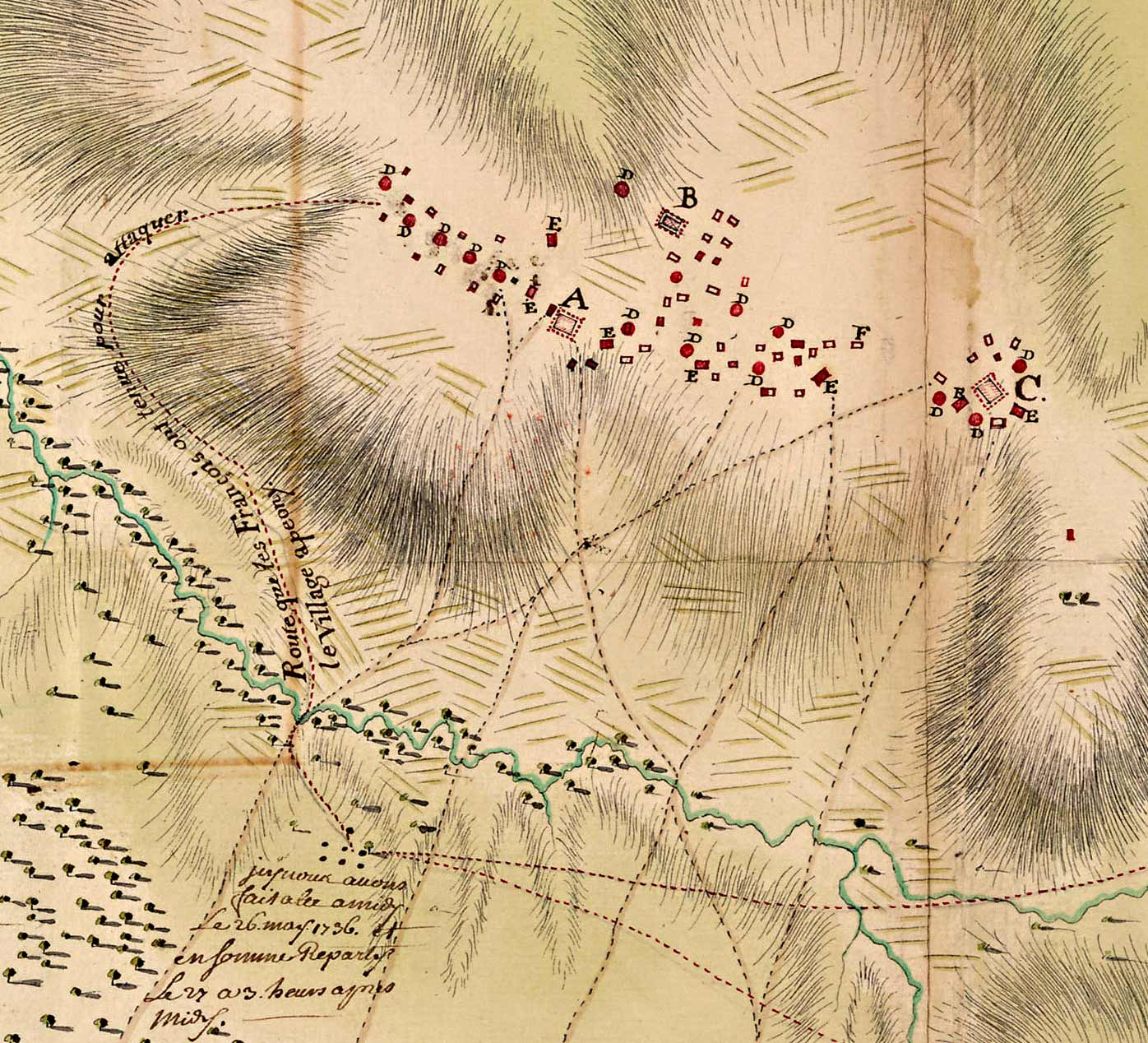
Battle of Ackia, 26 May 1736

== Assessment ==
B. F. French stated 'The war was rashly brought and rashly conducted. Bienville entered the enemy's country without any means of siege, made one attack on a fort, and then, without attempting by scouts to open a communication with D'Artaguette, whom he had ordered to meet him in the Chickasaw country on the 10th of May [sic], or making any attempt to give him proper orders, without even taking one Chickasaw prisoner to get any information of D'Artaguette's proceedings, he retreated, and ended the campaign disastrously.' Atkinson described as 'stupid' the frontal assaults against positions that were practically invincible. A Frenchman's relation of the observations of a Choctaw chief named Red Shoes is quoted by Atkinson: 'The French did not know at all the way to carry on war; we had been able to take only a little village of thirty of forty men; that on the contrary we had lost many men without being able to say that we had killed a single one; that our troops heavily clad marched with too slow a step and so close together that it was impossible for the Chickasaws to fire without killing some of them and wounding several.'

The Chickasaw were amply equipped with English arms via a trade route from the English and small Chickasaw settlements in South Carolina and Georgia. Their rectangular palisade forts with loopholed walls were complemented by round fortified houses, also with loopholes. With this technology the Chickasaw invincibly maintained their homeland against relentless pressure from the French and Choctaw, including a repeat campaign in 1739 and numerous small attacks by Choctaws for the next 20 years.

A village once thought to possess archaeological remains of Ackia battleground was made a U.S. National Monument in 1938. The National Park Service realized only a few years after establishment of the National Monument that Ackia and the battle were not located there, and it was absorbed into the Natchez Trace Parkway in 1961. It is now called 'Chickasaw Village.' Research 25 years later, however, determined that the actual site of Ackia and its neighboring villages are in a developed area of south Tupelo. A subdivision called 'Lee Acres' covers the site of the 1736 Battle of Ackia, cited by historians as a pivotal rebuff to French territorial ambitions in the Southeast.

== Sources ==
- Atkinson, James R. (2004). Splendid Land, Splendid People: The Chickasaw Indians to Removal. University of Alabama Press. pp. 39–61, 247–257. OCLC 52057896. Excellent modern history
- Gayarre, Charles (1851). Louisiana: Its Colonial History and Romance. Harper and Brothers. pp. 476–495. OCLC 13850788. Gayarre makes reference to original reports by Bienville, making his numbers more reliable.
- Batz, Alexandre de (September 1737). "Nations Amies et Ennemies des Tchicachas". Archived from the original on 2008-05-29. This French copy of a Chickasaw parchment map names Mingo Ouma as the Great War Chief of the Chickasaw in the 1736 battles.
- French, Benjamin F. (1853). Historical Memoirs of Louisiana. Lamport, Blakeman & Law. pp. 106–114. OCLC 13853287. English translation of the 1753 Mémoires Historiques sur la Louisiane, in turn an edited version of a manuscript by Jean François Benjamin Dumont de Montigny.
