= François-Marie Bissot, Sieur de Vincennes =

French officer and explorer (1700–1736)

- Historical marker in Vincennes, Indiana
- Born: 17 June 1700; Montreal, New France
- Died: 25 March 1736 (aged 35)
- Parent(s): Jean-Baptiste Bissot, Sieur de Vincennes; Marguerite Forestier

François-Marie Bissot, Sieur de Vincennes (17 June 1700 – 25 March 1736) was an explorer and soldier from New France who established several forts in what is now the U.S. state of Indiana, including Fort Vincennes.

François-Marie Bissot was born in Montreal to Jean-Baptiste Bissot, Sieur de Vincennes and Marguerite Forestier on 17 June 1700. He was named François Margane after his godfather and uncle. In 1717, he joined his father at Kekionga, a village of the Miami People near present-day Fort Wayne, Indiana in northeastern Indiana. His father was in charge of promoting loyalty to the French among the Miami. By 1718 Vincennes was working among the Ouiatenon Miamis on the upper Ouabache River. When his father died in 1719, François seemed to be the natural replacement.

In May 1722, Vincennes was commissioned an ensign and took control of Fort Ouiatenon near present-day Lafayette, Indiana. He was promoted to the rank of Lieutenant in 1730 and made commandant in what is now southern Indiana. The area became increasingly important to New France in keeping their connection to Louisiana open and keeping British traders out. Vincennes was central to this endeavor and also became increasingly attached to the Louisiana contingent. He was commissioned to build a trading post on the Wabash River and established Fort Vincennes where the modern city of Vincennes, Indiana, is located. Despite pleas by the governor of Louisiana to increase funding for Vincennes's project, the directors of the Company of the Indies, which controlled the territory at the time, were not responsive. Still, Vincennes convinced local Piankeshaw to establish a village at the post. In 1732, after the company returned Louisiana to the direct control of the king, funding and support for Vincennes's outpost increased.

In 1733, he married the daughter of Philippe Longpré of Kaskaskia. They had two daughters, Marie Therese and Catherine, the first children of his new village.

On 25 March 1736, Vincennes was burnt by the Chickasaw Indians, along with other captive French at the village of Ogoula Tchetoka, near the present site of Fulton, Mississippi, although the historical marker in Vincennes (pictured in this article) gives the location as Fulton, Tennessee. They were captured as the result of ill-advised raids in coordination with Pierre D'Artaguiette. The raids are now known as the Chickasaw Campaign of 1736 of the Chickasaw Wars.
