= Fort Prudhomme =

Stockade fortification in Memphis, Tennessee, US

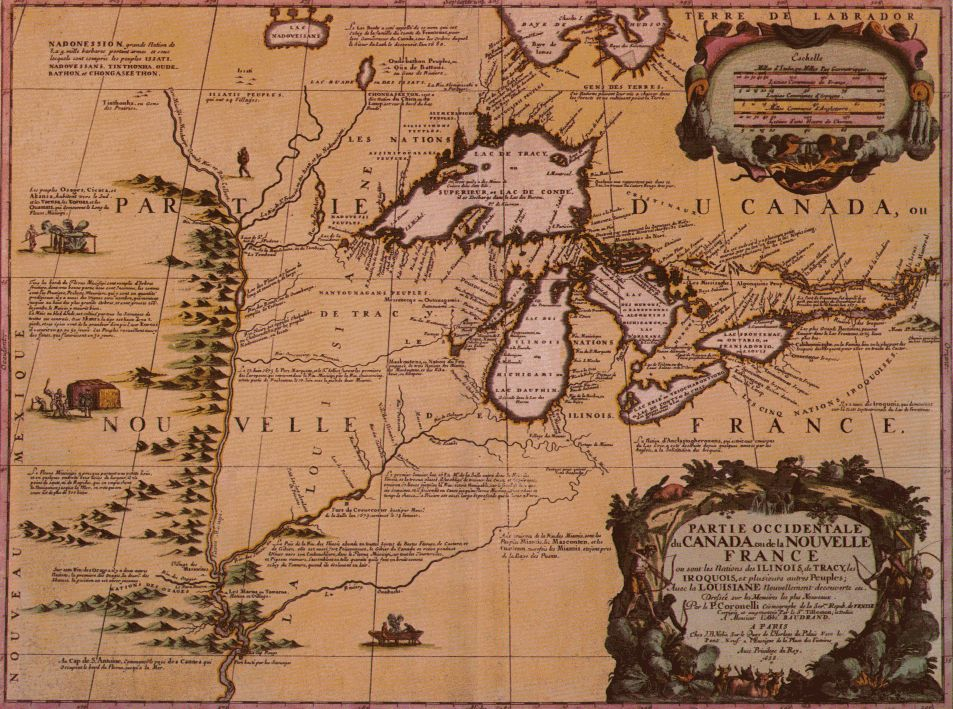
1688 map of the region explored by La Salle

Fort Prudhomme, or Prud'homme, was a simple stockade fortification, constructed in late February 1682 on one of the Chickasaw Bluffs of the Mississippi River in West Tennessee by Cavelier de La Salle's French canoe expedition of the Mississippi River Basin. The fortification was intended to provide shelter during the search for a member of the expedition who got lost at a stop while hunting, it was used by the expedition for only ten days. Fort Prudhomme was the first structure built by the French in Tennessee; its exact location is not known.

After de La Salle became ill during his expedition's return up the Mississippi in 1682, he was required to spend forty days at the fort until he had recuperated. Fort Prudhomme was the first structure built by the French in Tennessee.

== La Salle's expedition ==
René-Robert Cavelier, Sieur de La Salle (1643–1687) was a French explorer. In December, 1681, he started his second expedition. La Salle led a party of 41 on a canoe expedition from what is modern Peoria County, Illinois, located on the banks of the Illinois River, to the mouth of the Mississippi River in order to explore the Mississippi River basin. On their trip downriver, the expedition landed their canoes to hunt, when one of their members went missing. The armorer by the name of Pierre Prudhomme was assumed captured by Chickasaw Indians. La Salle decided to stay and search for the missing participant of the expedition.

On top of the Mississippi River bluffs in Tennessee, La Salle's party constructed a stockade fortification. The fort was the first structure built by the French in Tennessee. La Salle named the fortification "Fort Prudhomme", after their lost man. Ten days after his disappearance, the missing member of the expedition found his way back to the camp, unharmed but starving. Prudhomme had lost his way while hunting. The expedition resumed their trip downstream and La Salle reached the mouth of the Mississippi River on April 6, 1682. He claimed the entire Mississippi River valley for France, it remained French until 1762.

== Location ==
The position of Fort Prudhomme is unknown and a documented controversy about the exact location of the fortification exists. Researchers agree that it was located on the Chickasaw Bluffs but it is disputed on which of the four bluffs the fortification was located. Some historians say that Fort Prudhomme was built on the first Chickasaw Bluff, in modern-day Lauderdale County, placing it at the location of Fort Pillow, a later Civil War fortification, or "somewhere near this place". The Tennessee Encyclopedia of History and Culture suggests that Fort Prudhomme was built on the second Chickasaw Bluff, south of the Hatchie River, near modern-day Randolph in Tipton County. Other research mentions the third Chickasaw Bluff as the location of Fort Prudhomme, which would place the fortification at the border of what are modern day Tipton and Shelby Counties, encompassed in part by modern Meeman-Shelby Forest State Park. Other sources assume that "La Salle built Fort Prudhomme, possibly on the site of present-day Memphis", on the fourth Chickasaw Bluff below the mouth of the Wolf River, in what would later become Shelby County. The location on the fourth Chickasaw Bluff would put Fort Prudhomme at or near the site of the later French Fort Assumption which was used as a base against the Chickasaw in the abortive Campaign of 1739. The table below provides approximate coordinates for all four Chickasaw Bluffs, the possible locations of Fort Prudhomme, starting with the northernmost first Chickasaw Bluff above Fulton.

Bluff	Location (north to south)	County	Coordinates (approx.)
First	Above Fulton	Lauderdale	35.624°N 89.870°W
Second	At Randolph	Tipton	35.516°N 89.888°W
Third	Meeman-Shelby Forest State Park	Tipton and Shelby	35.371°N 90.065°W
Fourth	Below the mouth of the Wolf River at Memphis	Shelby	35.141°N 90.055°W

== See also ==
- Fort Pillow State Park
- List of forts in Tennessee
