= Fort Tombecbe =

- U.S. National Register of Historic Places
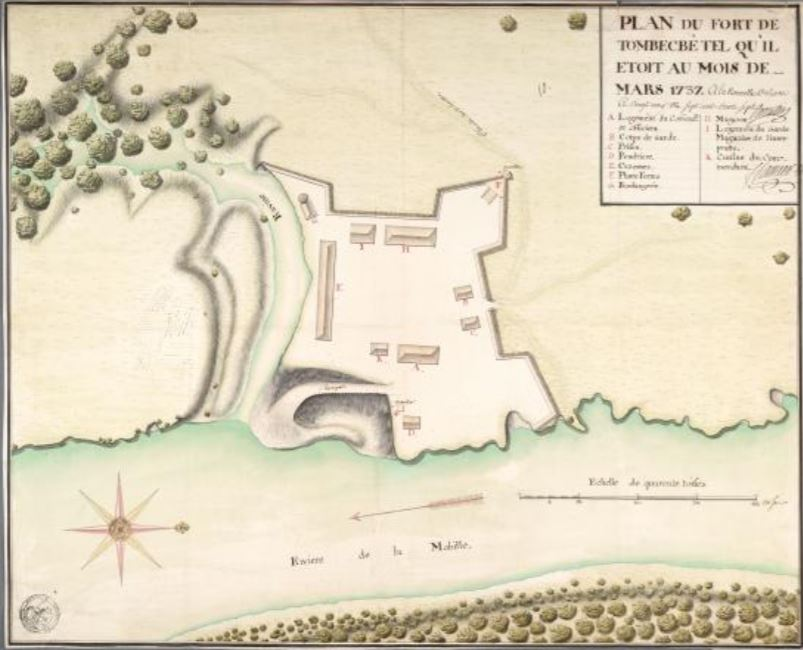
- Plan of Fort Tombecbe in March 1737 drawn by Ignace François Broutin.

- Location within Alabama Location within the United States
- Location: Epes, Alabama
- Coordinates: 32°41′53″N 88°7′4″W
- Built: 1736
- NRHP reference No.: 73000373
- Added to NRHP: October 02, 1973

Fort Tombecbe (Fort de Tombecbé), also spelled Tombecbee and Tombeché, was a stockade fort located on the Tombigbee River near the border of French Louisiana, in what is now Sumter County, Alabama. It was constructed under the leadership of Jean-Baptiste Le Moyne, Sieur de Bienville in 1736–1737 as trading post about 270 miles (430 km) upriver from Mobile, on an 80-foot (24 m) limestone bluff. Fort Tombecbe was built in Choctaw lands and would play a major role in colonial France's efforts to stop British intrusions into the area. Bienville claimed that the new fort was to protect the Choctaw from the Chickasaw. In May of 1736, Bienville, along with a force of 600 soldiers combined with a force of 600 Choctaw warriors, set out from Fort Tombecbe and attacked the Chickasaw near present-day Tupelo, Mississippi at the Battle of Ackia. Tombecbe was a major French outpost and trade depot among the Choctaw, the largest Native American group in the colony.

Control passed to the British in 1763, who renamed it Fort York. In 1793 Spain acquired the site—by then the fort had been abandoned—from the Choctaw via the Treaty of Boukfouka and built a new fort, which was named Fort Confederación. It is also known as Fort Confederation. After the United States took possession, via the 1802 Treaty of Fort Confederation, it continued to be used as a trading post with the Choctaws until its eventual abandonment in the 19th century.

The Fort Tombecbe site is currently owned by the University of West Alabama and the Archaeological Conservancy, and operated by the staff of the Black Belt Museum.

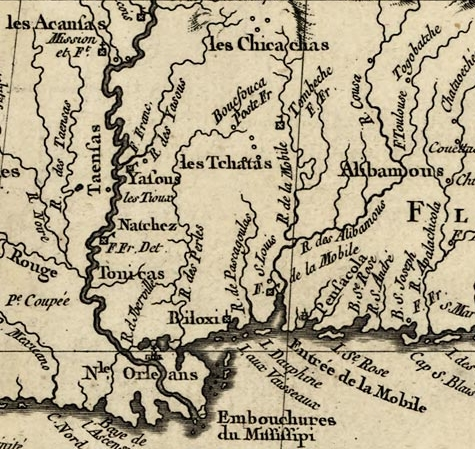
A portion of La Lousiane et Pays Voisins, Bellin's 1764 map of the Louisiana colony, indicating the location of Fort Tombecbe (near top center).

== See also ==
- Chickasaw Wars
- History of Alabama
