= Fort San Fernando De Las Barrancas =

Spanish colonial fort

Coordinates: 35.157°N 90.048°W

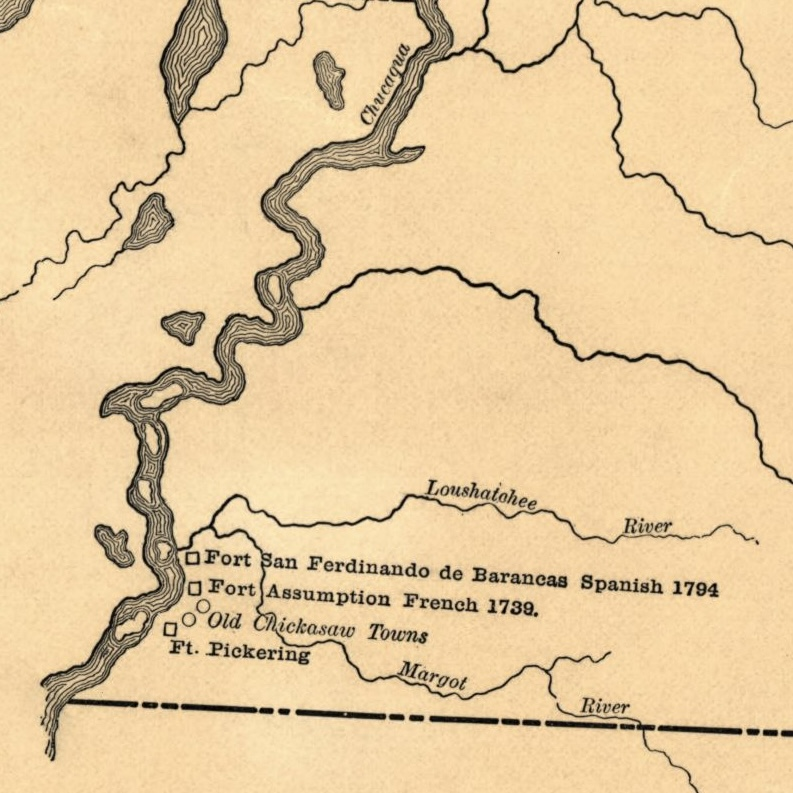
Aboriginal settlements and colonial forts near what is now Memphis, Tennessee

Fort San Fernando De Las Barrancas was a Spanish fort in what is now Memphis, Tennessee. Established in May 1795, the fort was erected with a garrison of 150 men to defend Spanish claims of the territory at the Fourth Chickasaw Bluff. Although Spain renounced its claim to the area in Pinckney's Treaty in 1795, it occupied the fort until either 1797 or 1798, when the Spanish dismantled the fort and established Fort Esperanza across the river near modern Marion, Arkansas.
