= Chickasaw Bluffs =

Location in Tennessee, US

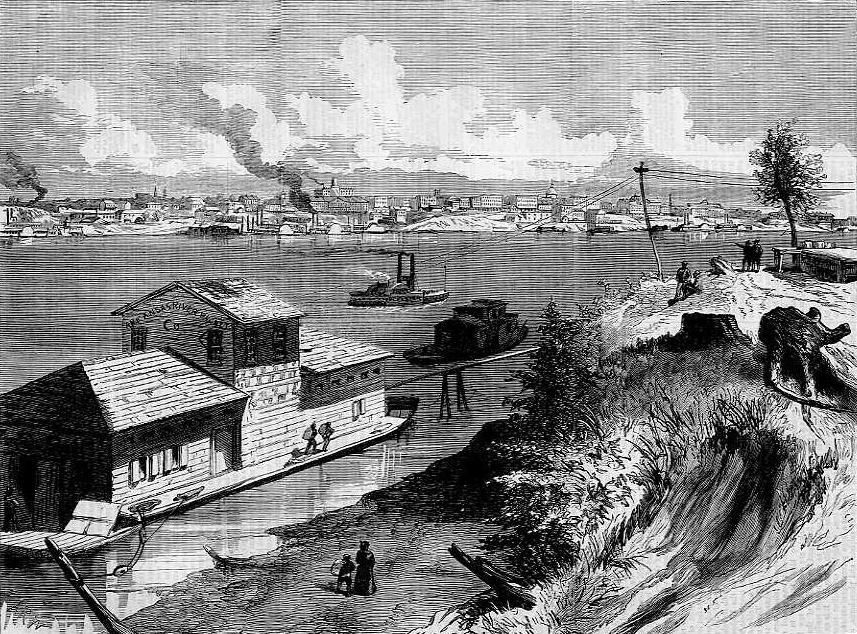
Fourth Chickasaw Bluff at Memphis

The Chickasaw Bluff is the high ground rising about 50 to 200 feet (20–60 m) above the Mississippi River flood plain between Fulton in Lauderdale County, Tennessee and Memphis in Shelby County, Tennessee.

This elevation, shaped as four bluffs, is named for the Chickasaw people. Known in the 19th century as one of the Five Civilized Nations in the Southeast, they occupied much of this area in western Tennessee and Mississippi. By their control of the bluffs, they could impede French river traffic in the 18th century when the peoples were at war.

== Location ==
The Chickasaw Bluffs were numbered by rivermen from one to four, starting from the north.

Bluff	Location (north to south)	County	Elevation	Coordinates (approx.)
First	Above Fulton	Lauderdale	90 m (295 ft)	35.624°N 89.870°W
Second	At Randolph	Tipton	96 m (315 ft)	35.516°N 89.888°W
Third	Meeman-Shelby Forest State Park	Tipton and Shelby	68 m (223 ft)	35.371°N 90.065°W
Fourth	Below the mouth of the Wolf River at Memphis	Shelby	103 m (337 ft)	35.141°N 90.055°W

The Battle of Fort Pillow was fought from the First Chickasaw Bluff. The battlefield is preserved as Fort Pillow State Historic Park. The town of Randolph, Tennessee was founded on the Second Chickasaw Bluff in the 1820s and was an early rival of Memphis until the 1840s. The town was destroyed twice during the Civil War. Today there is a small unincorporated settlement near the base of the bluff.

Meeman-Shelby Forest State Park was founded in the 1930s on top of the Third Chickasaw Bluff in an effort to restore the forest that had been clear-cut in the area as well as stem the erosion of the bluffs that had been caused by poor farming practices. Today the park offers opportunities for hiking, fishing, boating, and camping.

Downtown Memphis is located on the Fourth Chickasaw Bluff. The highest point is approximately located near Martyrs Park, with land gradually sloping downward towards the Wolf River Harbor northward. One of Memphis' main nicknames is the "Bluff City," named after the Chickasaw Bluff.

== Geology ==
The Chickasaw Bluffs are a relatively recent feature. They were formed from pleistocene loess (wind-blown) silt. This loess can be as thick as 70 feet and it generally tapers off as one moves eastward. The loess accumulated on top of fluvial deposits from the pliocene. These primarily consist of terrace gravels deposited from glacial runoff. Because of this, the bluffs are slide-prone, especially during seismic activity. The bluffs are characterized by very steep valleys and have higher gradient streams than areas to the east or west. Along the western edges facing the river or alluvial plains, the bluffs form nearly vertical cliffs. In Memphis, these edges have been smoothed out in the downtown area.

Although the Chickasaw Bluffs refer to the four numbered formations in Tennessee, the geological feature stretches from Hickman, Kentucky to around Baton Rouge, Louisiana. They do not form a continuous band, as they are split by river valleys such as the Obion River, Forked Deer River, Hatchie River, Loosahatchie River, Wolf River, Coldwater River, and Tallahatchie River.

It is theorized that Crowley's Ridge in Arkansas was part of the Chickasaw Bluff formation before the previous ice age when the prehistoric courses of the Ohio River and Mississippi River carved a path between the two. Crowley's Ridge has the same composition as the Chickasaw Bluffs and has similar topography.

== Human history ==
The fourth Chickasaw Bluff was the site of the French Fort Assumption, used as a base against the Chickasaw in the abortive Campaign of 1739. The Chickasaw Bluff secured Memphis from river floods, while a rare shelf of sandstone below provided a secure boat landing, making this the "only site for a commercial mart" between the Ohio River and Vicksburg, Mississippi. This location was also the meeting place of d'Artaguette, Chicagou and de Vincennes before their ill-fated 1736 attack against the Chickasaw.

=== Fort Prudhomme ===
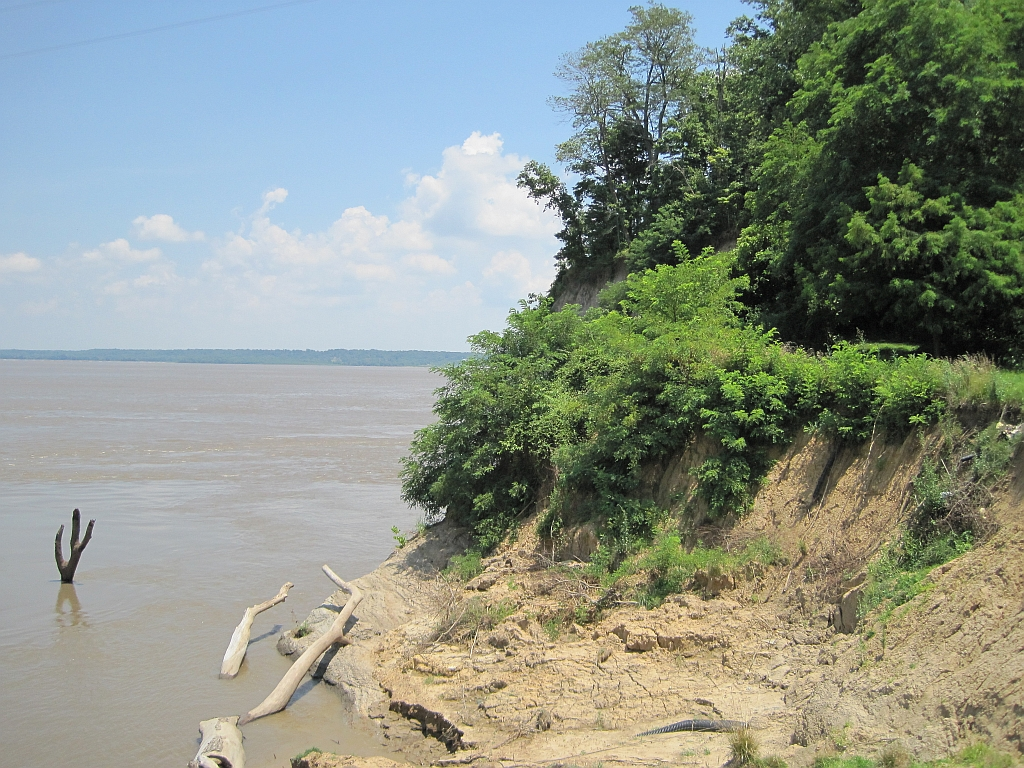
Second Chickasaw Bluff in Tipton County

The French built their Fort Prudhomme, or Prud'homme, at one of the Chickasaw Bluffs in 1682. René-Robert Cavelier, Sieur de La Salle (1643–87) was a French explorer. In 1682, La Salle led a canoe expedition to explore the Mississippi River basin. The expedition landed to hunt, when one of their members went missing. The armorer Pierre Prudhomme was assumed captured by Chickasaws.

La Salle decided to stay and search for the missing member. La Salle had a stockade built and named it Fort Prudhomme, after their lost man. This was the first structure built by the French in Tennessee. Days later, the missing man found his way back to La Salle. Prudhomme had lost his way while hunting. The expedition reached the mouth of the Mississippi River on April 6, 1682.

The exact location of Fort Prudhomme is unknown. Researchers agree that it was located on the Chickasaw Bluff but the site is disputed. Some historians claim that Fort Prudhomme was built on the first Chickasaw Bluff, in modern-day Lauderdale County. The Tennessee Encyclopedia of History and Culture suggests that the fort was constructed on the second Chickasaw Bluff near modern-day Randolph. Other research mentions the third Chickasaw Bluff as the location of the fort, at the border of modern Tipton and Shelby counties. The fourth Chickasaw Bluff in modern Shelby County at Memphis is also supported as a site of Fort Prudhomme.

=== American Revolution ===
During the American Revolution, the Chickasaw Bluffs were fortified by the British in an attempt to control the Mississippi River. In 1780, Captain Edward Worthington was ordered by George Rogers Clark to occupy the Bluff. Worthington and his Virginia soldiers constructed Fort Jefferson to protect American interests along the Mississippi River. In 1781, Captain Worthington was ordered by General Clark to withdraw his company of soldiers and abandon Fort Jefferson, which was remote and indefensible from continuous Chickasaw attacks.

=== Fur trade ===
A federal fur trade post was established in 1802. It was removed to Spadra Bluff, Arkansas in 1818.

== In popular culture ==
Reference is made to "the Bluff" in Johnny Cash's hit song, "Big River." The lyric's narrator describes his fruitless pursuit of a free-spirited love interest from Saint Paul to Davenport, St. Louis, Memphis, Baton Rouge, and eventually New Orleans. "I found her trail in Memphis," the song relates, "but she just walked up the Bluff / She raised a few eyebrows and she went on down alone." Some internet transcribers incorrectly use the word "block" rather than "bluff," but it is beyond doubt Cash had in mind the "Bluff City's" famous geology in his musical tour of the Mississippi.

== See also ==
- Fort Pillow State Park
