= Agapit Chicagou =

- Occupation: Native American leader of the Mitchigamea
- Known for: Visited Paris and participated in the Chickasaw Wars

Chief Chicagou, also known as Agapit Chicagou, was an 18th-century Native American leader of the Mitchigamea. He visited Paris and participated in the Chickasaw Wars.

'Agapit' may be a corruption of "Akapia," a Miami-Illinois term for the chief's ceremonial assistant.

== Paris ==
Mention was first made of Chief Chicagou in 1725, when his visit to Paris was discussed in the December 1725 issue of the Mercure de France. The Company of the Indies was responsible for bringing him and five other chiefs to France.

The chiefs met with King Louis XV on 22 November. The Mercure de France reported that Chicagou made a speech to the young French king pledging allegiance to the crown. On the next day, the king took the chiefs on a rabbit hunt.

It was while the chiefs were in Paris that Jean-Philippe Rameau attended a performance given by them at the Theatre Italien. At this performance they danced three kinds of dance: the Peace, War and Victory dances. Rameau was inspired by this to write a piece for harpsichord entitled Les Sauvages. This was later published in Nouvelles Suites de Pieces de Clavecin.

== After Paris ==
In 1730, a letter by Father Mathurin le Petit describes the Natchez and Yazoo War of 1729–1731. In it, Father mentions that representatives of the Illiniwek nation gave their allegiance to the French. He further mentions that Chicagou was at the head of the Mitchigamea and that Mamantouensa was at the head of the Kaskaskia.

Next it is reported that the Illiniwek warriors participated in the Battle of Ogoula Tchetoka during the Chickasaw Wars in 1736. While attacking a village of Natchez refugees near present day Pontotoc, Mississippi, they were defeated and fled when the Chickasaw and English surprised them from behind a hill.

The last mention is by Jean Bernard Bossu in his journal; here he describes meeting with an Indian prince Chicique (probably not pronounced "Chi-ki-kwe" as the ending "kwe" would denote a woman's name) who was the son of the since deceased Chief Chicagou who visited Paris.
