= Fort Assumption =

18th century French military base in present day Tennessee

- Memphis, Tennessee

Location
- Location of Fort Assumption in the state of Tennessee
- Coordinates: 35.122°N 90.074°W

Site history
- Built: 1739
- Built by: French Army
- In use: 1739–1740
- Events: Abortive Campaign of 1739

Garrison information
- Past commanders: Jean-Baptiste Le Moyne, Sieur de Bienville
- Garrison: 1,200

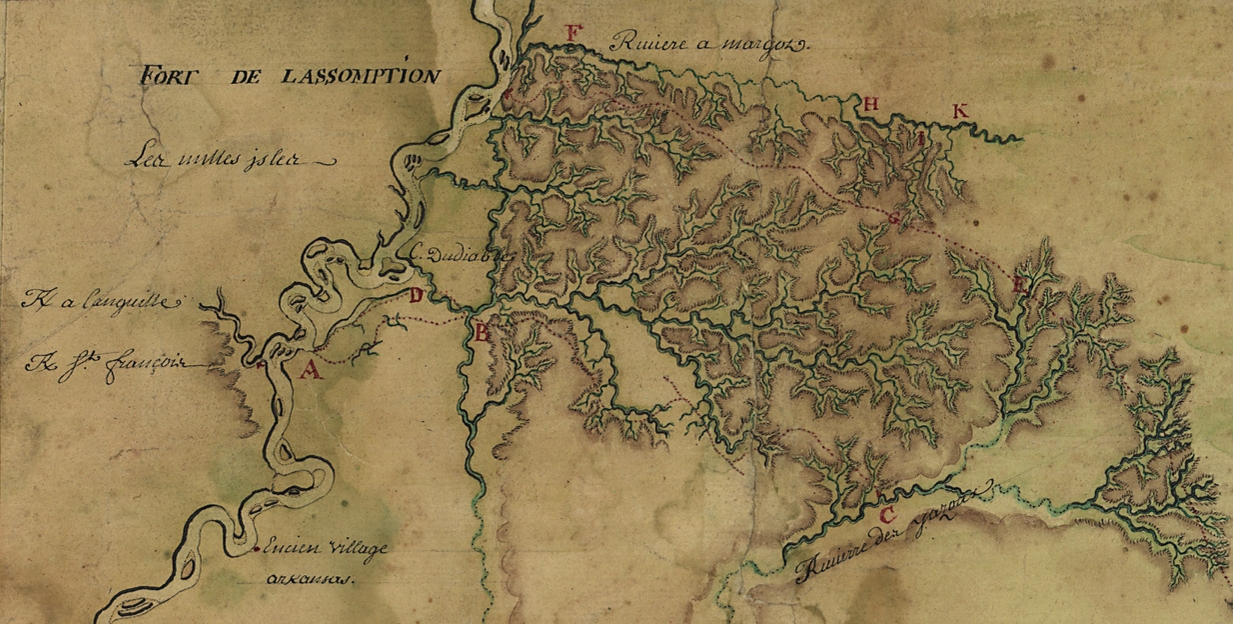
Location of Fort Assumption on a 1743 map

Fort Assumption (or Fort De L'Assomption) was a French fortification constructed in 1739 on the fourth Chickasaw Bluff on the Mississippi River in Shelby County, present day Memphis, Tennessee. The fort was used as a base against the Chickasaw in the unsuccessful Indian-removal Campaign of 1739.

== History ==
In 1739, Jean-Baptiste Le Moyne, Sieur de Bienville led an army of 1,200 Frenchmen into the area of what is modern day Shelby County, Tennessee to eradicate the native Chickasaw Indians in order to secure and prepare the land for settlement by the French. He had roughly 2,400 black and Native soldiers in his army as well. As a base for the operation he chose the fourth Chickasaw Bluff because of Its strategic position on high-ground overlooking the Mississippi River and ordered the construction of a fortification on top of the bluff. On August 15, 1739, the day of the Feast of the Assumption, the fort was finished and named Fort Assumption in commemoration of the holy day. The French stronghold consisted of three bastions facing the land and two bastions fronting the Mississippi River. On the slope from the river to the top of the Bluff seven wide terraces protected from attacks. During the winter of 1739/40, the garrison was plagued by "weather, disease, desertion and drunkenness". The Chickasaw had taken French hostages during the eradication campaign, the hostages were released on March 20, 1740, after negotiations. On March 31, 1740, the discouraged and exhausted French troops were withdrawn and the fortification was abandoned by the French army. Although the French presence on the fourth Chickasaw Bluff only lasted for a few months, the area was claimed by France for eighty years.

Some historical research indicates that Fort Assumption could have been built on or near the site of an earlier French stockade fortification, Fort Prudhomme. Cavelier de La Salle's canoe expedition of the Mississippi River Delta constructed Fort Prudhomme in 1682.

== Location ==
Fort Assumption was located at 35.122°N 90.074°W, on the banks of the Mississippi River in what is now downtown Memphis. The site of the former fort lends its name to the surrounding neighborhood, the "French Fort Neighborhood."

== Significance ==
The fort was destroyed in the spring of 1740 after the campaign was deemed a failure. Bienville's activity there was the first recorded European presence on the land that Memphis occupies today. Fort Assumption was also the first structure built by Europeans in what is now Shelby county, and the third European building in all of Tennessee. Bienville's failure was also a contributing factor that led to French king Louis XV to sign the Treaty of Fontainebleau, in which France forfeited their territory in Louisiana to Spain, as Louis XV was frustrated with the country's inability to rid the area of its native inhabitance.

== See also ==
- Campaign of 1739
- Fort Prudhomme
- Alexandre Berthier
- Treaty of Fontainebleau
