= Pierre d'Artaguiette =

- Died: 1736
- Military career
- Rank: Major
- Conflicts: Chickasaw Wars

Pierre d'Artaguiette or d'Artaguette (died 1736), said to be a Canadian, was the younger brother of Diron d'Artaguette. As an officer in the French Army in 1730, Pierre was mentioned in dispatches for "brilliant valor" during the Natchez revolt (Gayarre 1851, p. 441), after which Perier appointed him to rebuild Fort Rosalie (Wallace 1893, p. 288). In 1734 Bienville sent him to Fort de Chartres with the rank of Major to command the Illinois District of the Province of Louisiana. In 1736 d'Artaguiette led a force of French and Illini against the formidable Chickasaw during the Chickasaw Wars. His impetuous attack at Ogoula Tchetoka on 25 March 1736 was crushed. Some accounts say d'Artaguiette died on the battlefield; others state he was captured with 18 other Frenchmen and burned alive.

Preceded by Robert Groston de Saint-Ange	Commander of the Illinois District; 1734 – 1736	Succeeded by Alphonse de la Buissoniere
