= Savannah Town, South Carolina =

Defunct settlement in South Carolina, U.S.

Coordinates: 33°26′18″N 81°54′32″W

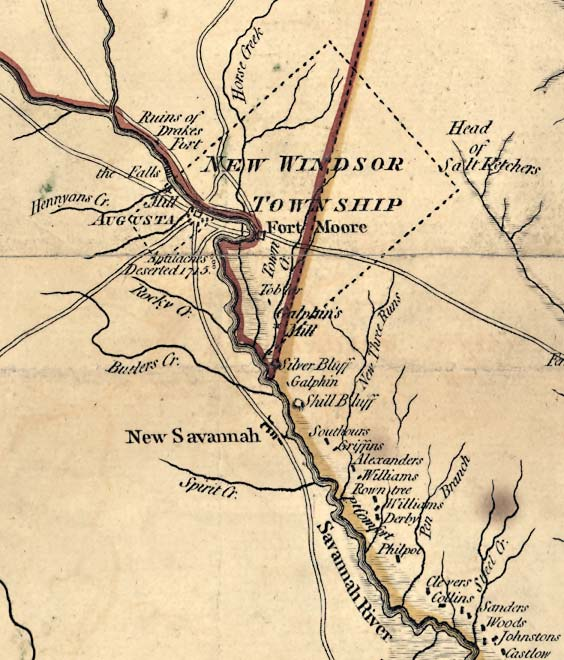
Central Savannah River in 1775 showing Augusta, Fort Moore / Savannah Town, New Savannah, and bounds of New Windsor Township

Savannah Town, South Carolina is a defunct settlement that was located in the colonial years on the Savannah River below the Fall Line in present-day Aiken County. In the 1670s the Westo had a village here, but they were displaced by the Savannah (as the English called a local Shawnee band) in a trade war, and it became known by 1685 as Savannah Town. The English colony had traders who did a lucrative business in dressed skins with the Savannah Shawnee. Fortified as a frontier post, the settlement developed and ferry service was established across the river. The town was gradually overtaken by its competitor of Augusta, Georgia, established in 1735 five miles upriver and closer to Indian settlements. Traders here intercepted commerce, sending it to their port of Savannah on the coast. By 1740 Savannah Town was declining, and by 1765 the village was abandoned and the fort closed.

Nearby Silver Bluff was the site in 1773–1775 of the first separate black congregation organized in the current United States; most were slaves. During the American Revolutionary War, when the British occupied Savannah, Georgia, most of the congregation members migrated to the city to gain freedom as promised by the British. Some were evacuated with the British in the last days of the war.

== History ==
This settlement was first recorded by English colonists as a Westo village; they later recognized that the Savannah (Shawnee) displaced the Westo in a 1679-1680 trade war. Joel Gascoyne's 1685 Plat of the Province of Carolina showed the settlement by the name of Savannah Town (Cumming #101). The growing English colony considered Savannah Town important for its profitable Indian trade, and for frontier defense.

A thriving business developed around colonial traders, many of them Scots-Irish, who used pack horses to carry their goods and travel throughout Native American communities in what was then considered the interior, western wilderness away from Low Country settlements. In 1692 the South Carolina Proprietors expressed their hope that traders would reside at "Savannah town" (McCrady p. 237). In 1698, Colonel Thomas Welch reached the Mississippi River on a Native American trail, which came to be known as the Upper Trading Path to the Chickasaw homeland (Atkinson p. 25). Traders offered the Shawnee and other Indians iron and woolen goods in exchange for the dressed skins (mostly deer) which they shipped by the thousands from Savannah Town via oared 'periagoe' (pirogue in French) to Charles Town, and thence to Europe. The colonial authorities built Fort Moore nearby in 1715 and garrisoned it with perhaps twenty-five soldiers. In 1740 settlers established a ferry service across the Savannah River.

The Savannah people resented the encroaching Englishmen and slowly departed the area. In the early 1720s the South Carolina Assembly invited Chickasaw living in northern Mississippi to occupy the area, hoping to encourage trade and use them defensively on the frontier. Seeking to strengthen ties with the English as a source of guns, a Chickasaw group led by Squirrel King (as he was known to the colonists) came to Savannah Town in 1723, settling along nearby Horse Creek. These Chickasaw collaborated with the English colonists in defense of this area from other tribes until returning to their Mississippi homeland about the time of the Revolutionary War.

In 1730, South Carolina organized eleven frontier townships to buffer the more developed Low Country settlements. Savannah Town was incorporated into the Parish and Township of New Windsor. In 1737, 200 settlers from Appenzell, Switzerland colonized New Windsor; descendants of the Tobler, Zubly, Nagel, Sturzenegger, and Meyer families are part of local history.

Savannah Town gained a competitor in 1735 with the founding of Augusta, five river miles upstream on the Georgia side of the Savannah River. The new Colony of Georgia took good advantage of the settlement's superior position, closer to the bulk of the interior Indian settlements, to attract traders to Augusta. Georgia colonists worked to deflect commercial traffic to their own Atlantic coastal seaport at Savannah.

By 1740 the prospect for Savannah Town was a matter of dispute. During the Cherokee war of 1760, Fort Moore harbored militia and refugees, but by 1765, the town as such had disappeared, and the fort was closed.

== Geography ==
Savannah Town, variously called Savano Town, Savanaton or Old Savannah, was located at 33°26'18"N, 81°54'32"W (NAD83/WGS84), 225 river miles above the port of Savannah. The closest modern town is Beech Island, South Carolina. (Related names of settlements are the city of Savannah, Georgia, founded in 1733 at the mouth of the river by James Oglethorpe, and New Savannah, a Chickasaw town located downstream on the Georgia side of the river.)

== Notable people and places ==
Due to uncertain political jurisdiction over Savannah River islands and sand bars, this area became a popular dueling ground in the early 19th century. The ferry at Savannah Town, later called Sand Bar Ferry, continued to operate until a road bridge was constructed over the river in the 1920s.

George Galphin operated a trading post at nearby Silver Bluff; it was prosperous until Galphin's death in 1780.

Silver Bluff was developed for plantation agriculture, where many African slaves worked. It was the site of the first African-American congregation to be organized in the South, founded in 1773-1775 under elder David George during the Great Awakening. The black Baptist congregation later moved into Savannah, Georgia during the Revolutionary War, where the slaves could gain freedom behind British lines.
