= One22One =

Office building in Nashville

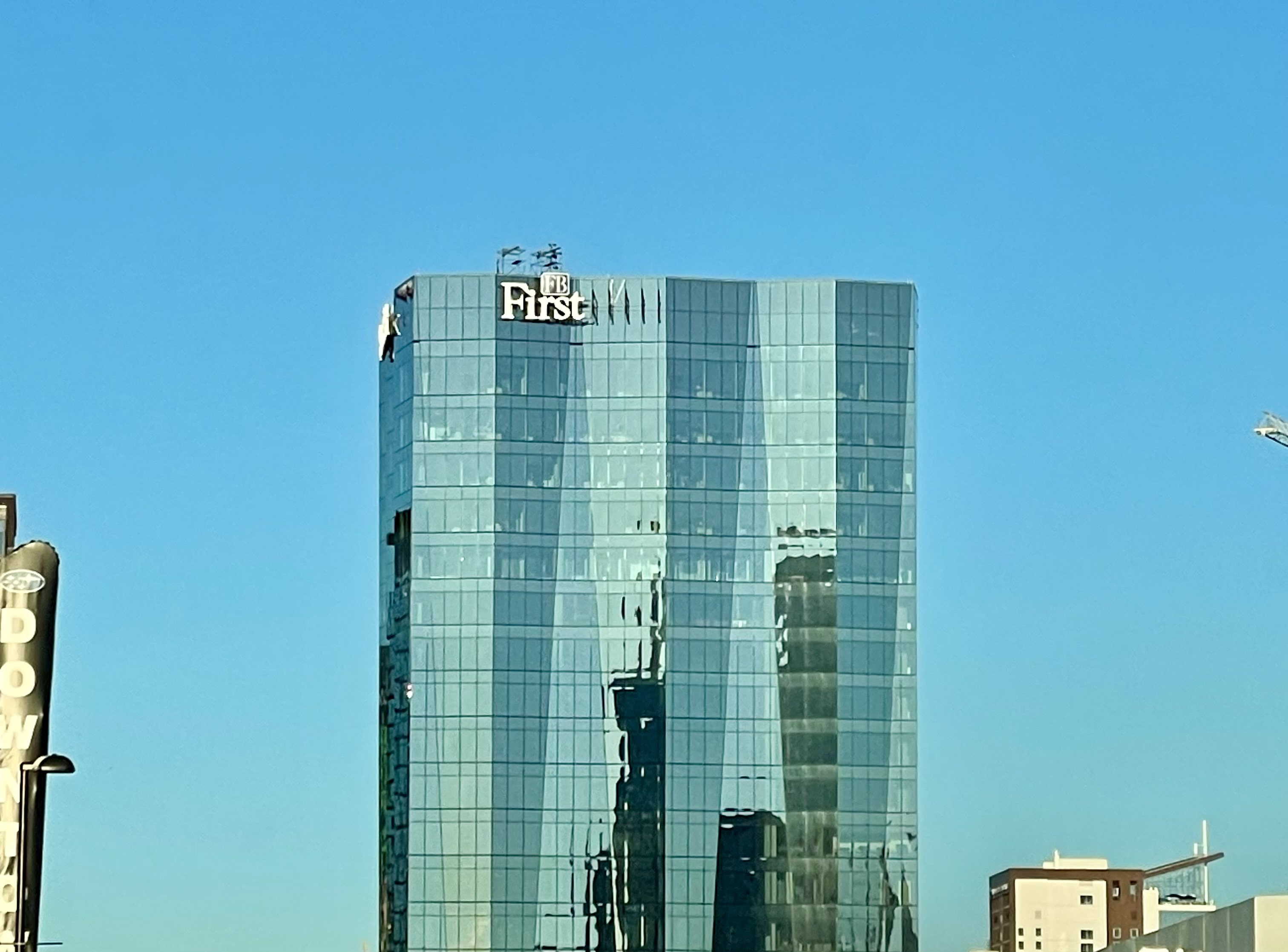
- One22One in 2024

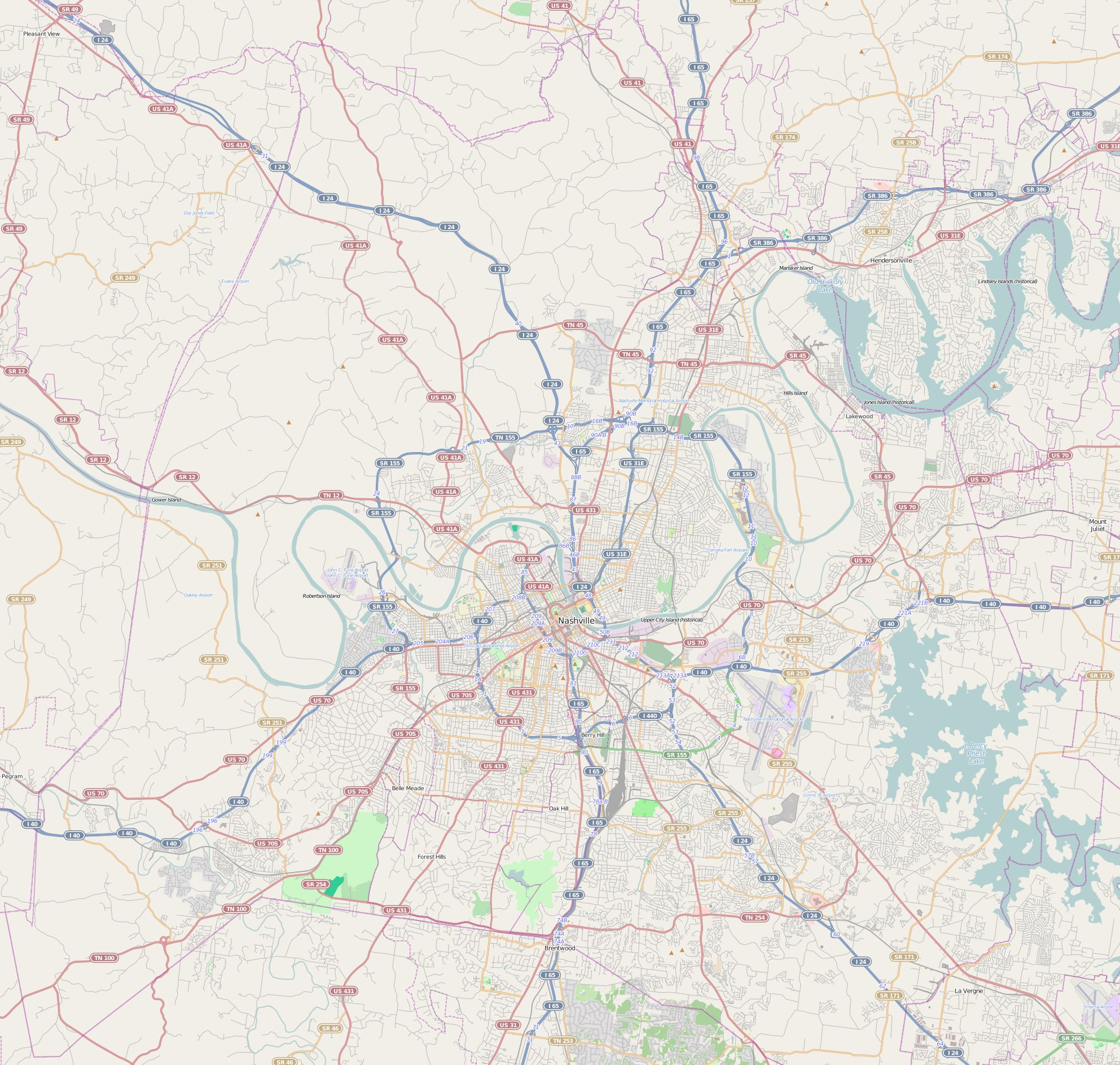
- Location within Nashville

General information
- Status: Completed
- Type: Office
- Architectural style: Modern
- Location: 1221 Broadway Street, Nashville, Tennessee, United States
- Coordinates: 36°09′20″N 86°47′17″W
- Completed: 2023

Height
- Roof: 360 ft (110 m)

Technical details
- Floor count: 26

Design and construction
- Architect: Gresham Smith

Website
- www.one22one.com

One22One is a 360 ft (110 m) tall modern office building located on 1221 Broadway Street in Nashville. It was built in 2023 and has 26 floors. As of May 2026, it is the 25th-tallest building in Nashville and the 29th tallest building in Tennessee.

The building was designed by Gresham Smith, which designed other modern skyscrapers in Downtown Nashville such as the Pinnacle Office Tower, The Place at Fifth + Broadway, and 501 Commerce Street.

The building won the 2023 CoStar Award for top commercial development; it was also named Office Development of the Year by the Nashville Chapter of the National Association of Industrial and Office Properties.

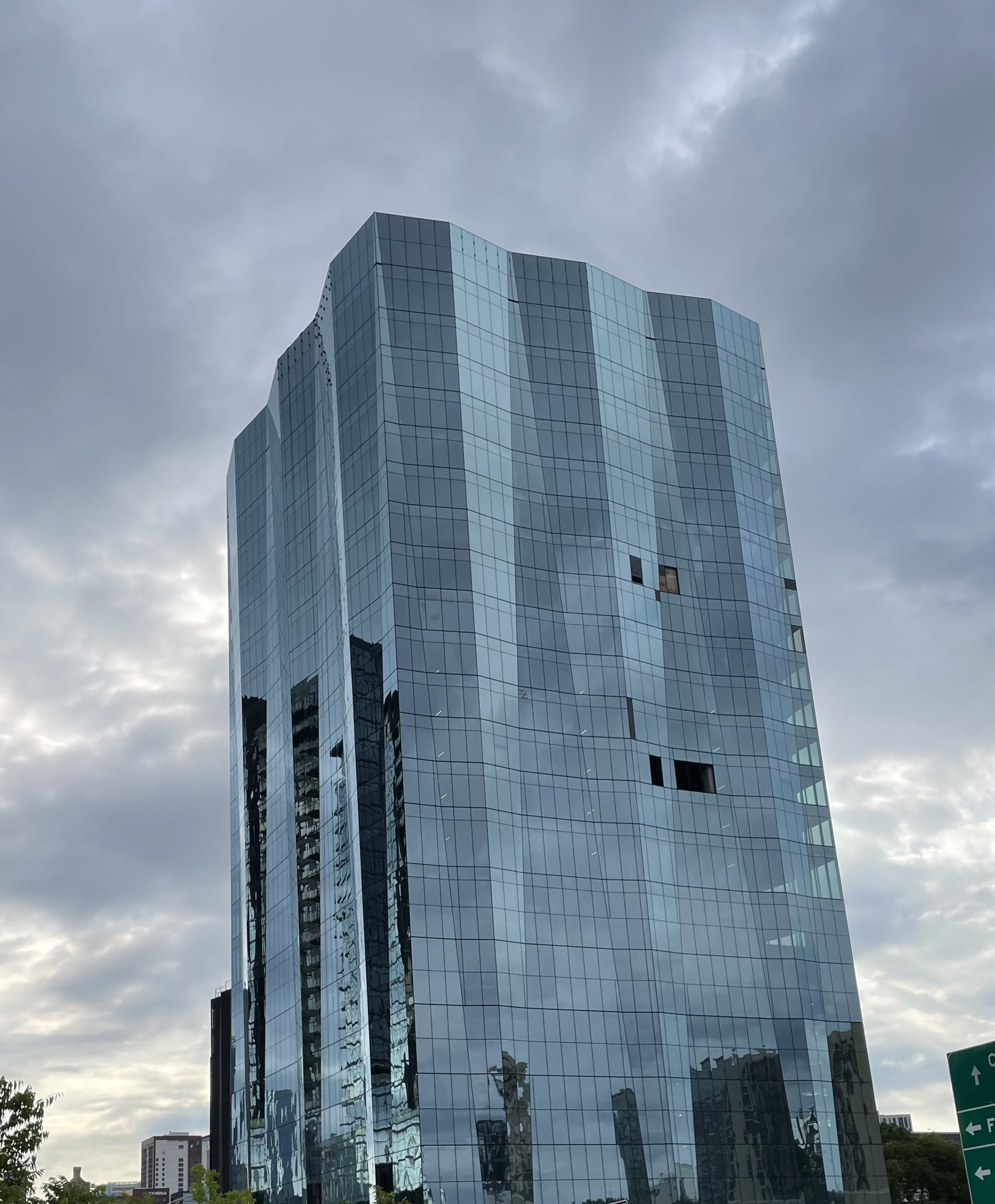
One22One in May 2022

== See also ==
- List of tallest buildings in Nashville
- List of tallest buildings in Tennessee
- Alcove
- Viridian Tower
- Bridgestone Tower
- Paramount Tower
