= The Roger Hotel =

Hotel in Manhattan, New York

Coordinates: 40°44′44.27″N 73°59′3.43″W

The Roger New York
- Interactive map of the The Roger New York area
- Former names: Roger Williams Hotel
- Alternative names: The Roger Hotel

General information
- Architectural style: Boutique; retro/eclectic
- Classification: Hotel
- Location: 131 Madison Avenue, Manhattan, New York
- Opened: 1930
- Renovated: 2012

Design and construction
- Other designers: Annette Jaffe; Interior Designer

Other information
- Number of rooms: 194
- Number of restaurants: 1
- Number of bars: 1
- Parking: Yes

Website
- www.TheRogerNewYork.com

The Roger New York is a luxury hotel in Midtown Manhattan, New York City. The hotel is operated and managed by Los Angeles-based JRK Property Holdings.

Originally built atop a plot of land leased from the 150-year-old Madison Avenue Baptist Church next door, the hotel was named "Roger Williams" in honor of the Rhode Island theologian and abolitionist who started the first Baptist Church in America.

== See also ==
- List of New York City hotels
