= BellSouth Building =

BellSouth Building may refer to:

- BellSouth Building (Atlanta): BellSouth Telecommunications headquarters (corporate headquarters is also in Atlanta at the Campanile Building), now called Tower Square.
- BellSouth Building (Nashville): regional headquarters, now called AT&T Building.

== See also ==
- BellSouth
