= William R. Snodgrass Tennessee Tower =

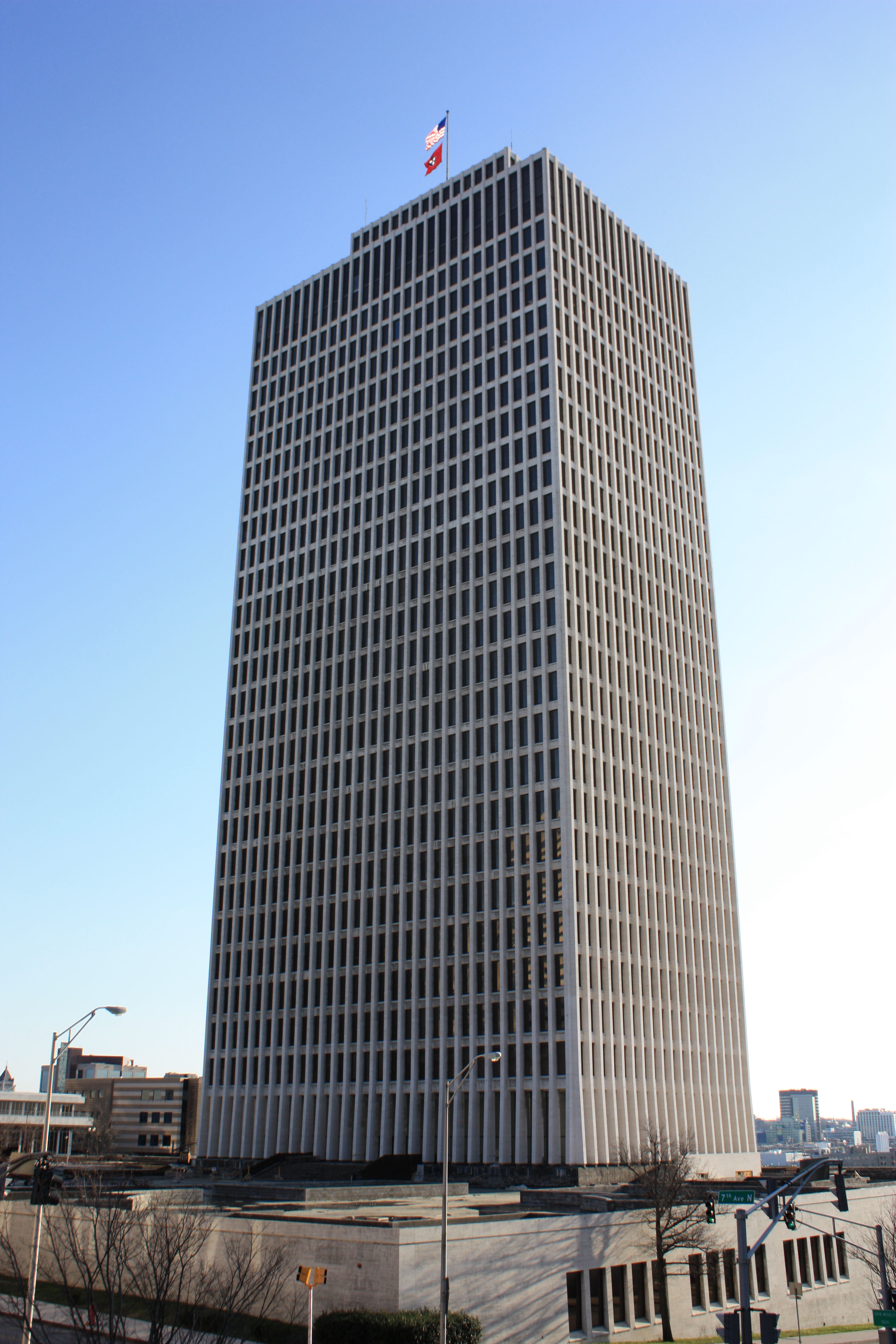
- Interactive map of the William R. Snodgrass Tennessee Tower area

General information
- Type: Office
- Architectural style: International Style
- Location: 312 Rosa L. Parks Ave. Nashville, Tennessee; United States
- Coordinates: 36.1639°N 86.7849°W
- Completed: 1970
- Owner: State of Tennessee

Height
- Roof: 452 feet (138 m)

Technical details
- Floor count: 31
- Floor area: 831,394 sq ft (77,239.0 m^{2})

Design and construction
- Architect: Skidmore, Owings & Merrill

The William R. Snodgrass Tennessee Tower (also known as the Tennessee Tower) is a skyscraper in downtown Nashville, Tennessee, that houses Tennessee government offices. The tower was built for the National Life and Accident Insurance Company and served as its National Life Center until the State of Tennessee acquired it on January 3, 1994. More than 1,000 state employees who had been assigned to numerous locations now work in the building.

The building is named in honor of William R. Snodgrass, a career public servant who served as Tennessee's Comptroller of the Treasury from 1955 to 1999.

The tower was struck by lightning on August 31, 2003, which caused a firepump to turn on the sprinkler system. This caused flooding and extensive damage to the elevator shafts.

Prior to being purchased by the state, the building was used to display messages by turning on lights in the windows on the front of the building. After being dormant for 10 years, a new message – "Peace" – was displayed on December 17, 2007. Since then, however, the light display was cut to reduce costs.

== See also ==
- List of tallest buildings in Nashville

Preceded by Life & Casualty Tower	Tallest Building in Nashville; 1970—1986; 138m	Succeeded by Fifth Third Center
