= Four Seasons Hotel and Residences (Nashville) =

Skyscraper in Nashville, Tennessee

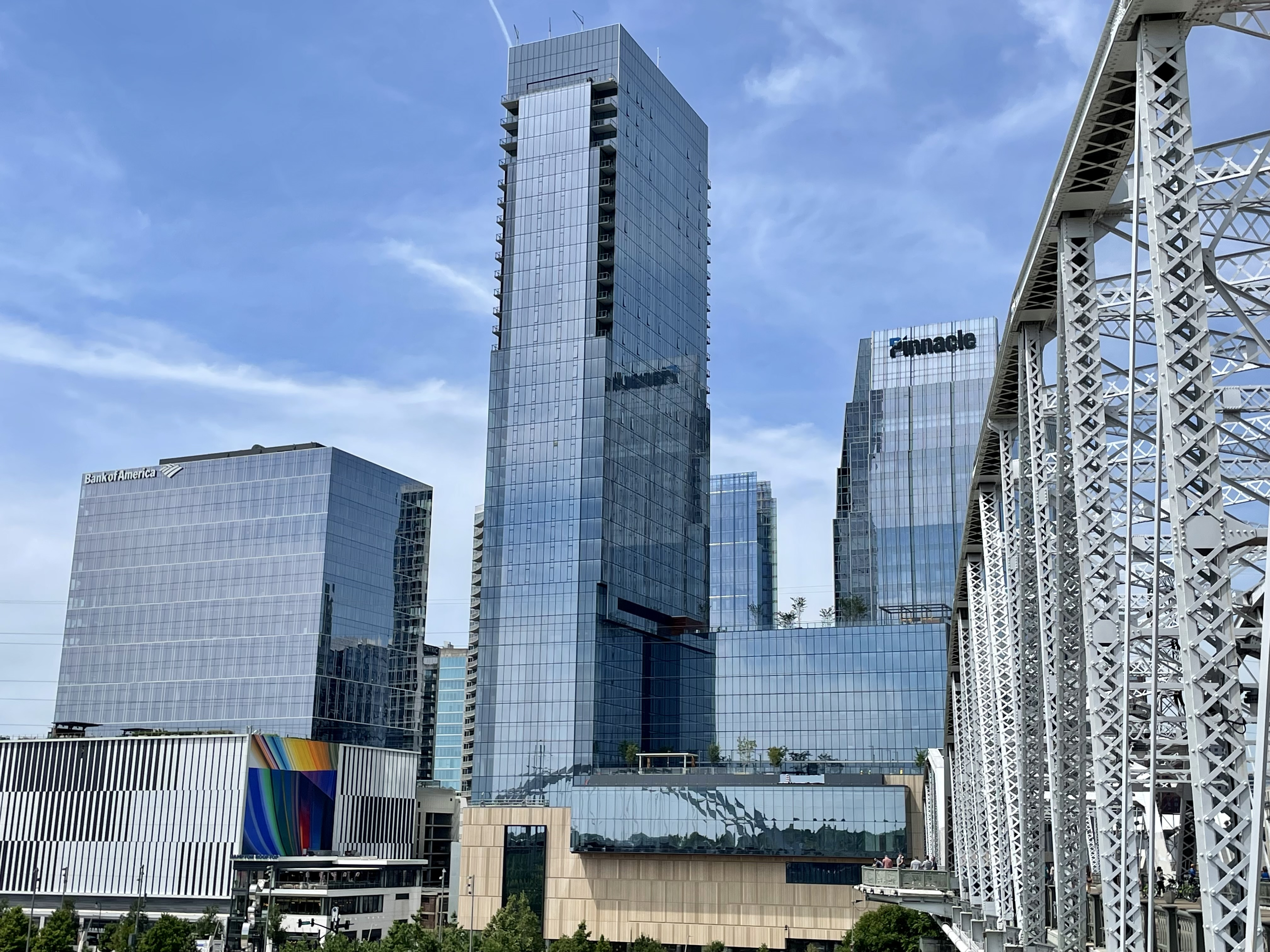
- Four Seasons Hotel and Residences in 2022
- Interactive map of the Four Seasons Hotel and Residences area

General information
- Status: Completed
- Coordinates: 36.16029022181093°N 86.77368637521833°W
- Construction started: June 2019
- Completed: November 2022

Height
- Height: 542 ft (165 m)

Technical details
- Floor count: 40

Design and construction
- Architect: Solomon Cordwell Buenz
- Developer: AECON Capital and The Congress Group
- Main contractor: AECOM Hunt

Four Seasons Hotel and Residences is a 542-foot (165 m), 40-story skyscraper located in Nashville, Tennessee. The building contains 235 hotel rooms between floors 5 and 14 and another 144 private condominium units on the upper levels. It is the largest competed building in Nashville during the 2020s thus far, however, it will be passed when Paramount Tower completes in 2028. Four Seasons Hotel and Residences is the tallest building by roof height in all of Tennessee. Also includes the tallest Penthouse in Nashville, selling for $33,500,000 on Zillow, making it the top 3 most expensive listings in Tennessee.

== History ==
Four Seasons Hotel and Residences was originally proposed by Los Angeles-based AECOM Capital and Boston-based The Congress Group as a two-tower project to redevelop a low-rise apartment building but the plans were later altered to instead include a single high-rise. In March 2019, Four Seasons Hotels and Resorts announced it would constitute the tower's hotel component. In April 2019, it was announced that construction would proceed after the development team secured $360 million in financing for the project. On June 20, 2019, a groundbreaking ceremony was held for Four Seasons Hotel and Residence.

In November 2023, the hotel component of Four Seasons Hotel and Residences was purchased by Mexico-based GD Holdings LLC for $165 million.

== Construction ==
Construction on Four Seasons Hotel and Residences began in June 2019 and was finished in November 2022. The building was designed by Solomon Cordwell Bunz and AECOM Hunt served as the general contractor.

== See also ==
- List of tallest buildings in Nashville
