= Courtyard Nashville Downtown =

Hotel in Nashville, Tennessee, US

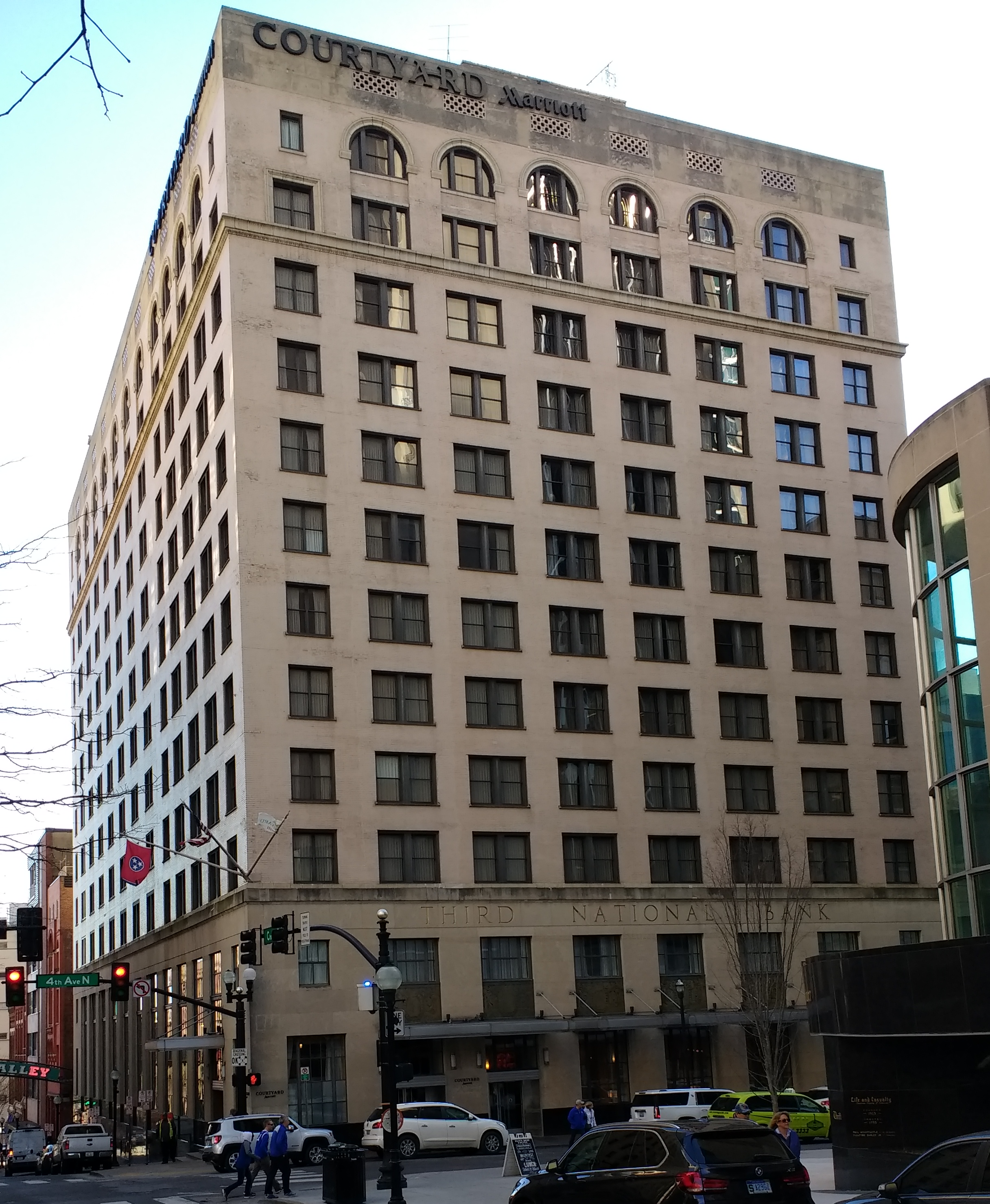
- Interactive map of the Courtyard Nashville Downtown area
- Former names: First National Bank Building; Independent Life Insurance Company Building; Third National Bank; J.C. Bradford Building

General information
- Architectural style: Neo-Classical
- Location: Nashville, Tennessee, 170 Fourth Avenue North
- Coordinates: 36.1637°N 86.7785°W
- Completed: 1904

Height
- Height: 168 feet (51 m)

Technical details
- Floor count: 12

The Courtyard Nashville Downtown is a hotel in Nashville, Tennessee, housed in the historic Neo-Classical-style First National Bank Building, built in 1904.

The First National Bank of Nashville was organized in 1863. The bank's twelve-story building, designed by architect Barnett, Hayes and Barnett and built in 1904, was the tallest building in the city at time of its construction and is known as "Nashville's first skyscraper".

In later years, when the building housed other tenants, it was known first as the Independent Life Insurance Company Building and later as the Third National Bank. In 1936, the Third National Bank added a twelve-story air-conditioned extension to the original bank building and installed a new facade. The Third National Bank name is emblazoned on the building's western and northern walls.

From 1968 to 1986 the building housed the offices of J.C. Bradford Company. After J.C. Bradford moved out, the building remained vacant until 1997, when it was restored and renovated for use as a hotel.

Preceded by Unknown	Tallest Building in Nashville; 1905—1908; 51m	Succeeded by The Stahlman
