= Alcove (Nashville) =

Skyscraper in Nashville

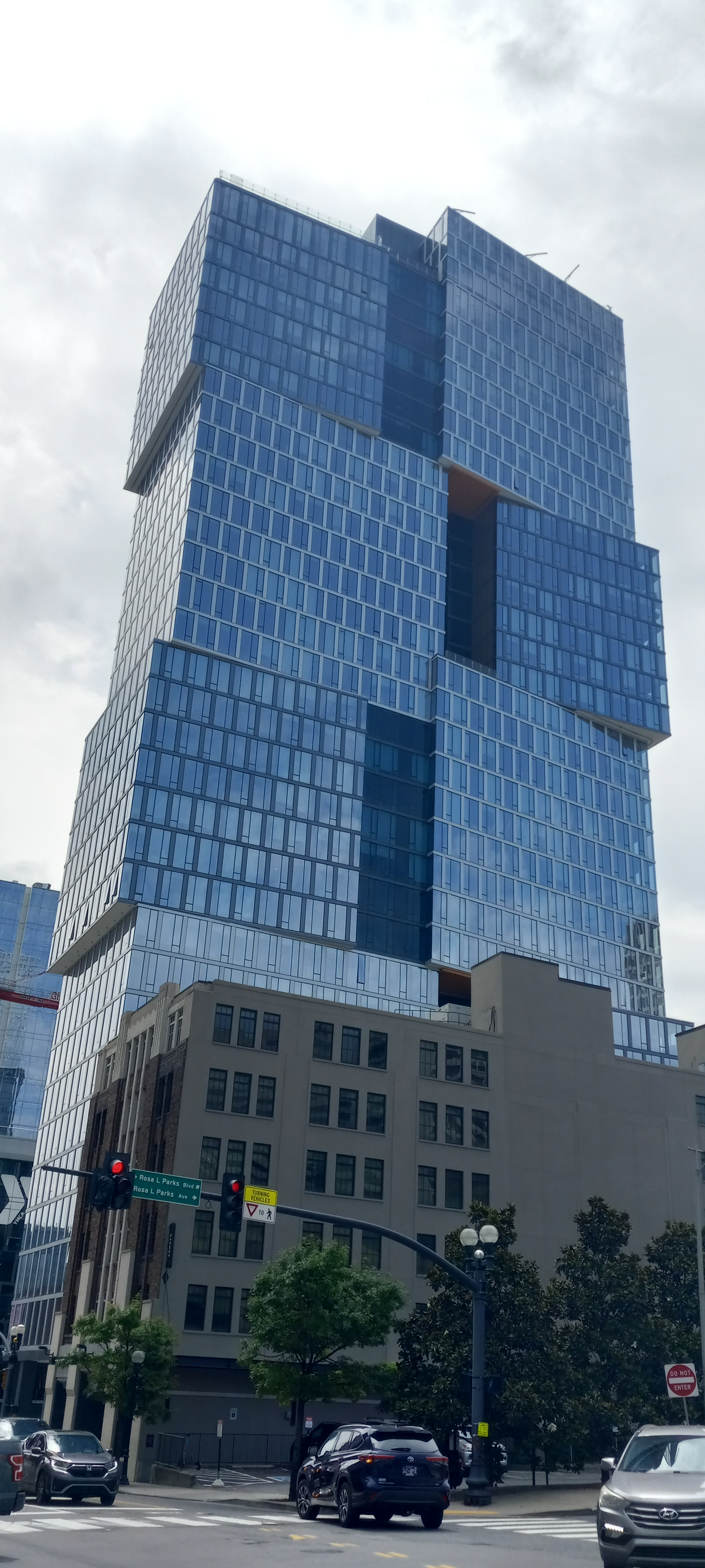
- Interactive map of the Alcove area

General information
- Status: Completed
- Type: Residential
- Location: 900 Church Street; Nashville, Tennessee; United States
- Coordinates: 36°9′41″N 86°47′05″W
- Construction started: 2021
- Topped-out: September 8, 2022
- Completed: 2023

Height
- Height: 419 ft (128 m)

Technical details
- Floor count: 34
- Floor area: 375,800 sq ft (34,910 m^{2})

Design and construction
- Architecture firm: Goettsch Partners
- Developer: Giarratana Development, LLC
- Main contractor: AECOM Hunt

Other information
- Number of units: 356

Website
- https://alcovenashville.com/

Alcove is a 419 ft (128 m), 34 story skyscraper in Nashville, Tennessee. Construction started in 2021 and finished in 2023 after originally being proposed in 2020. It is located at the intersection of Ninth and Church Street, adjacent to the Nashville Yards district. The building contains 356 residential units and 375,800 sq ft (34,910 m^{2}) of space. Alcove's design is intended to resemble Amazon boxes stacked on top of each other, referencing the Amazon offices two blocks away.

The building became noted in 2023 for being the first building in Nashville to use a Mitsubishi Electric elevator that includes touch-free calling capabilities.

In October 2024, Alcove won the category of best skyscraper in the 100-199 meter category as designated by the Chicago-based Council on Tall Buildings and Urban Habitat (CTBUH). It is the first building in Nashville to be recognized by the firm in this way.

On May 6, 2026, Elon Musk's Boring Company announced that they would tunnel through Church Street and add stations underneath Alcove, Prime, and the under-construction Paramount Tower for residents to use. The residents of these buildings would take an elevator from their building directly to the tunnels, which would eliminate the use of some conventional road trips. The Boring Company also states that the trip from Alcove would only be a two-minute drive from downtown, and nine minutes from the Nashville International Airport. No set completion date has been set for this project and would likely be built after phase one of the Music City Loop

== See also ==
- List of tallest buildings in Nashville
- List of tallest buildings in Tennessee
