= The Stahlman =

- U.S. Historic district – Contributing property
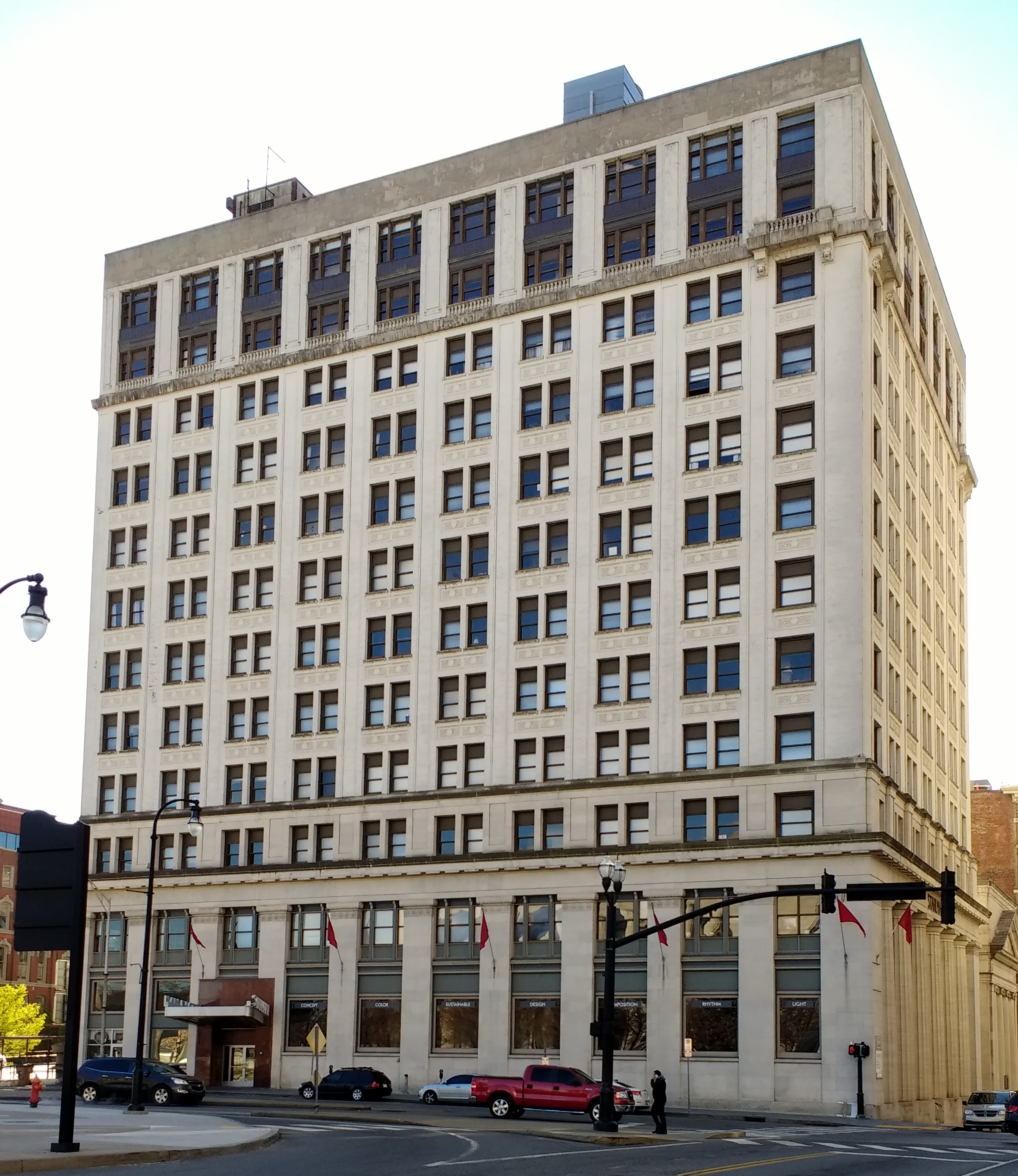

- Location within Tennessee Location within the United States
- Location: Third Avenue, North and Union Street, Nashville, Tennessee
- Coordinates: 36°09′56″N 86°46′42″W
- Area: <1 Acre
- Built: 1907
- Architect: James Edwin Ruthven Carpenter, Jr. and Walter D. Blair
- Architectural style: Beaux-Arts
- Part of: Nashville Financial Historic District (ID02000232)
- Designated CP: March 20, 2002

The Stahlman is a historic building in Nashville, Tennessee, U.S. It was completed in 1907 for Major Edward Bushrod Stahlman.

== History ==
It was built by Major Edward Bushrod Stahlman. When the Stahlman building opened in 1907, it housed the Fourth National Bank. The original vault still resides in the basement. It remained in the Stahlman family until the 1950s.

Over 100 years old, the building has been renovated into loft apartments and retail space. Since 1967, its roof has featured large neon letters spelling the callsign of radio station WKDF (and before that, its predecessor, WKDA), which occupied part of the building until moving to new facilities in 1978.

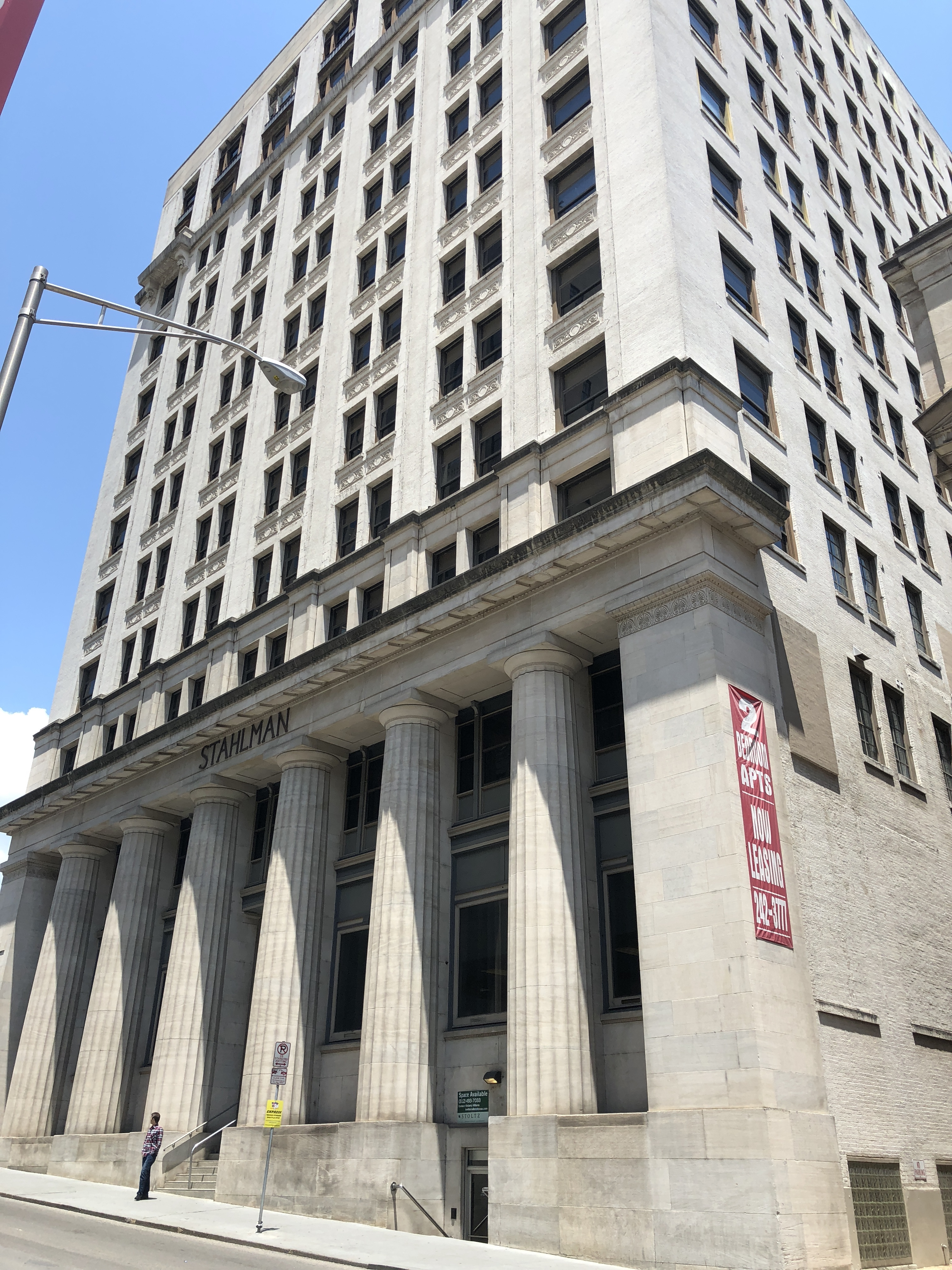
Stahlman Building Nashville 2018 from the southeast

== Architectural significance ==
The building was designed by architects James Edwin Ruthven Carpenter, Jr. and Walter D. Blair. It has been listed on the National Register of Historic Places as a contributing property to the Nashville Financial Historic District since March 20, 2002.

| Preceded by Courtyard Nashville Downtown | Tallest Building in Nashville; 1908—1957; 54m | Succeeded by Life & Casualty Tower |
