= 333 Commerce =

Skyscraper in Nashville, Tennessee

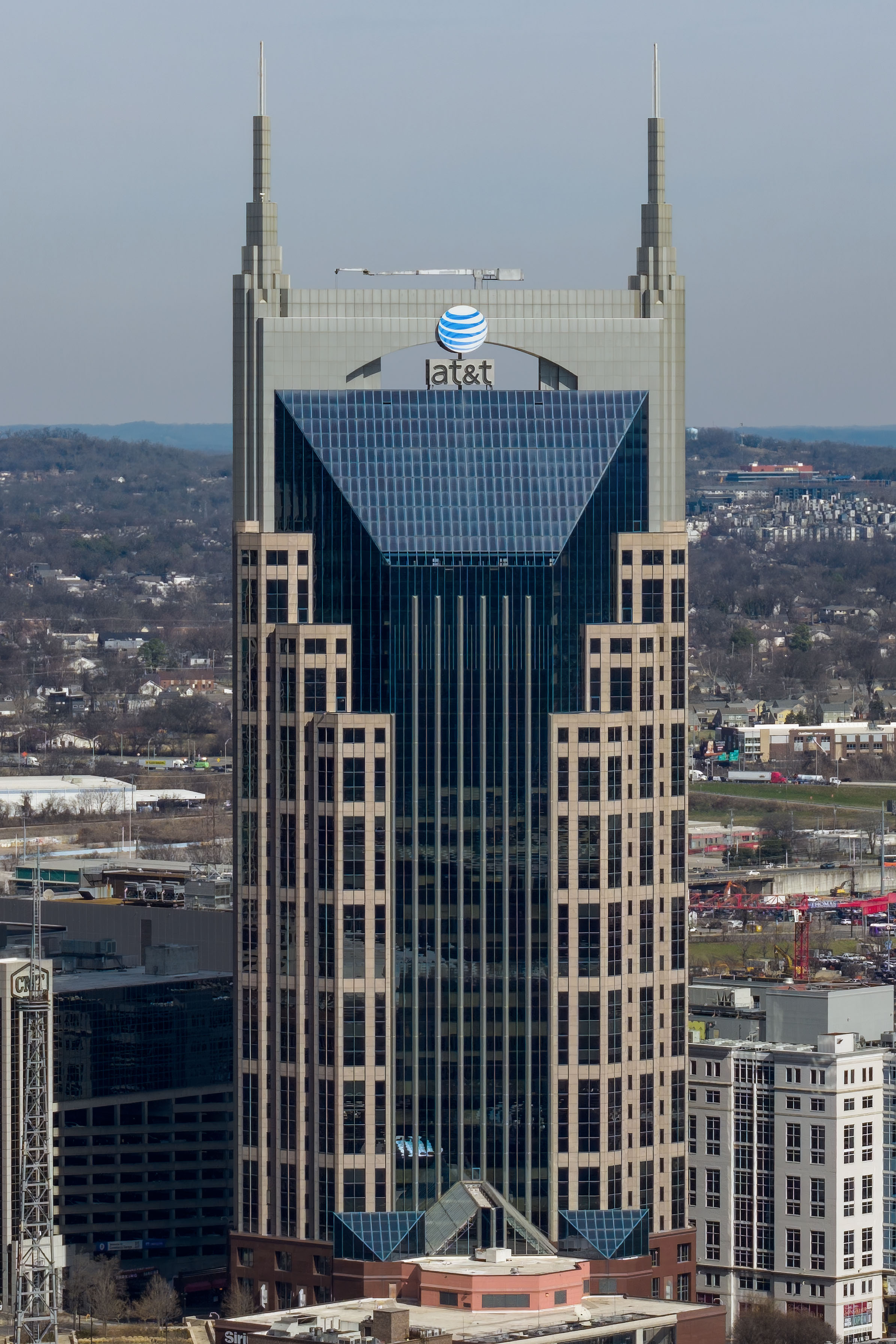
- 333 Commerce in 2026

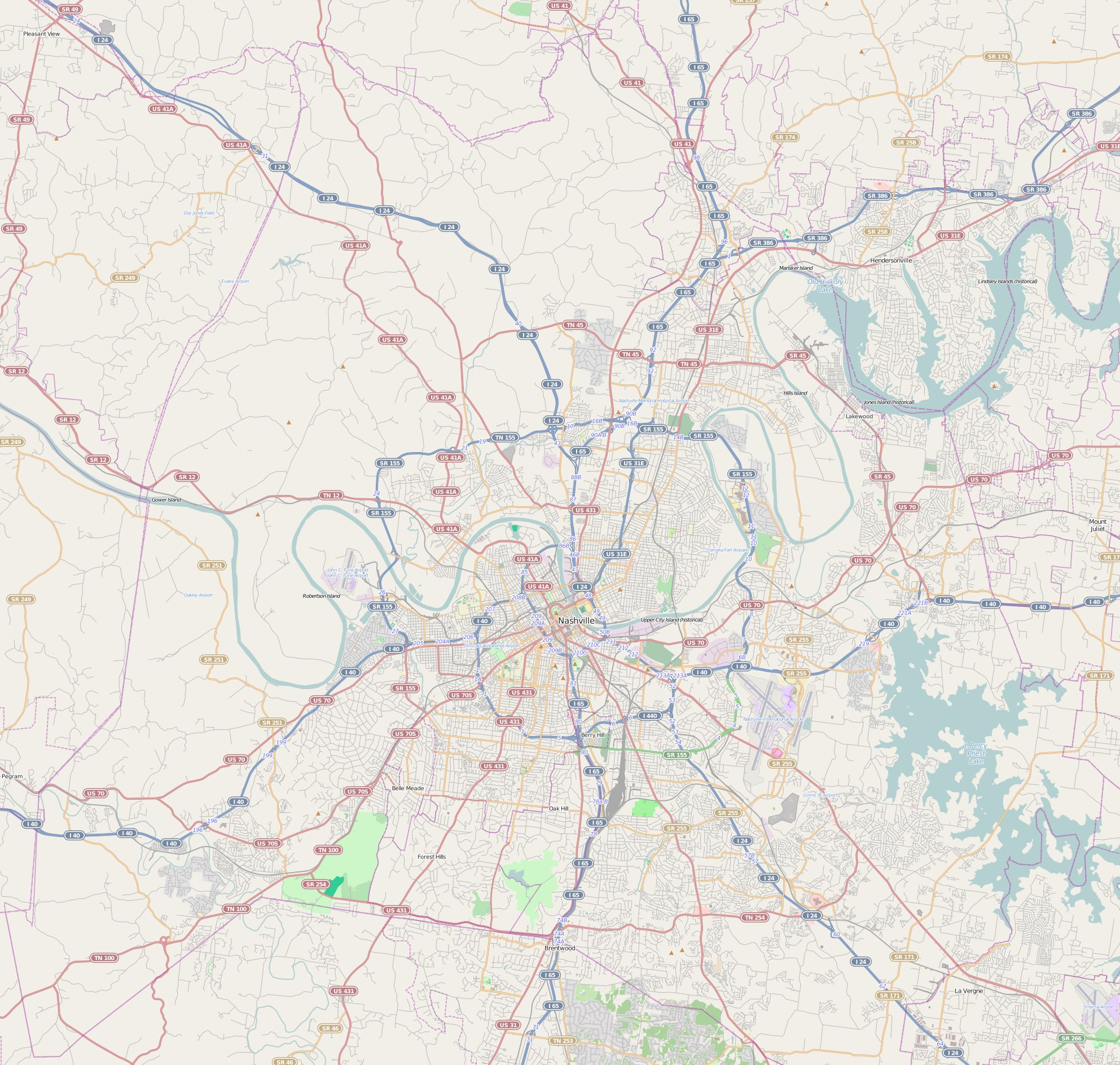
- Location within Nashville
- Former names: AT&T Building; South Central Bell Building; BellSouth Building
- Alternative names: Batman Building

General information
- Type: Office building
- Architectural style: Postmodern
- Location: 333 Commerce Street; Nashville, Tennessee, United States
- Coordinates: 36°9′45″N 86°46′37″W
- Construction started: 1991
- Topped-out: October 24, 1993
- Completed: September 1994
- Opened: October 1994
- Cost: US$94,000,000 (equivalent to $204,187,247 in 2025)
- Owner: Pitney Bowes; Cerberus Capital Management; MTL Leasing; Cushman & Wakefield

Height
- Antenna spire: 617 ft (188.1 m)
- Roof: 452 ft (137.8 m)

Technical details
- Floor count: 33
- Floor area: 690,297 sq ft (64,131 m^{2}) office area >1,000,000 sq ft (93,000 m^{2}) total area

Design and construction
- Architecture firm: Earl Swensson Associates
- Developer: The Mathews Company
- Structural engineer: Stanley D. Lindsey and Assoc.
- Services engineer: I. C. Thomasson Assoc.
- Main contractor: Brasfield & Gorrie; Ray Bell Construction

Website
- 333commerce.com

333 Commerce Street (formerly the AT&T Building, South Central Bell Building, and BellSouth Building, also colloquially known as the Batman Building) is a 617-foot (188 m), 33-story skyscraper completed in September 1994 and located in Nashville, Tennessee. The structure is designed as an office tower capable of housing 2,000 workers. It is currently the tallest building in the state of Tennessee.

== Architecture and design ==
The building sits on 2.7 acres (11,000 m^{2}) of property on Commerce St between 3rd and 4th Avenues North, and has a footprint of 1 2/3 city blocks. It features a three-story winter garden atrium as its foyer and has a nine-story underground parking garage with 1,300 vehicle capacity. Its distinctive design and dark coloration, along with its two spires, have earned it the nickname "Batman Building", due to its resemblance to the cowl of superhero character Batman.

Richard Miller, the president of architectural firm Earl Swensson Associates, said of the design process: "...at the time we did that [South Central Bell] wanted a signature piece of architecture. What happens inside the building drives the way the outside looks."

In August 2009, the French online business journal Le Journal du Net named the iconic "Batman Building", or as the article names it "La tour de Batman", one of the 12 most original office buildings in the world.

In 2011, a drawing of 333 Commerce – alongside images of iconic structures from Tennessee's three other large cities (the Memphis Pyramid, Knoxville's Sunsphere, and the Tennessee Aquarium of Chattanooga) – was incorporated into the standard design of Tennessee's state-issued driver's licenses. The design was replaced with a new one featuring the state capitol in 2024.

== Tenants ==
AT&T, previously BellSouth Telecommunications and before that South Central Bell, has operated its Tennessee headquarters out of the building since it was opened in 1994. Prior to 2006, it was the sole occupant of the building, and now occupies approximately 500,000 sq ft (46,000 m^{2}) of office space. AT&T held a 23.5 year lease ending in January 2020, which was renewed for an undisclosed period of time in March 2019. Nissan North America operated a temporary headquarters in the remainder of office area, twelve floors, for two years before relocating to a permanent location in Franklin, Tennessee, in mid-2008. Other notable tenants that have held space include Hankook Tire America and U.S. Bank.

Local television station WTVF Channel 5, while not utilizing office space, operates two live remotely controlled video cameras mounted on the western spire, which were established in 1995 and 1996. These cameras are used to provide scenic views of Nashville and assist in covering news events.

== Ownership ==
After completion in 1994, 333 Commerce was purchased by Prefco XIV L.P., a limited partnership of the Pitney Bowes Real Estate Financing Corp, for US$100.8 million. Ownership of the building was transferred to Cerberus Capital Management subsidiary EntreCap Financial in July 2006 after Cerberus acquired Prefco. The building was immediately placed back on the market for resell, and in mid-2007 was sold to MTL Leasing LLC for an undisclosed sum. The building is currently owned by MetLife Investment Management.

== See also ==
- List of tallest buildings in Nashville
- List of tallest buildings by U.S. state and territory

Preceded by Fifth Third Center	Tallest Building in Nashville; 1994—Present; 188.1 m	Succeeded by None
