= Renaissance Nashville Hotel =

Hotel in Nashville, Tennessee, US

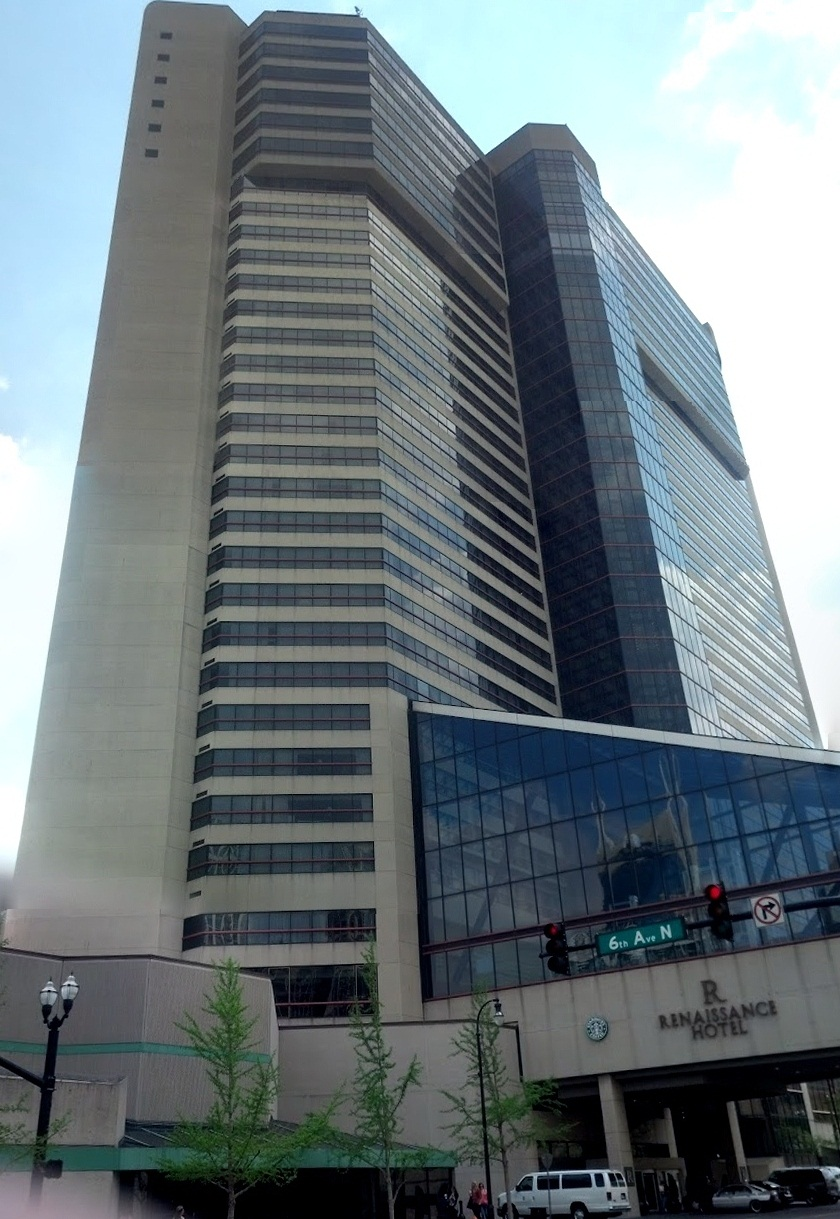
- Interactive map of the Renaissance Nashville Hotel area

General information
- Location: 611 Commerce Street; Nashville, Tennessee; United States
- Coordinates: 36.1608°N 86.7810°W
- Completed: 1987
- Owner: Renaissance Hotels

Height
- Roof: 385 ft (117 m)

Technical details
- Floor count: 31

Design and construction
- Structural engineer: Stanley D. Lindsey and Associates, Ltd.
- Main contractor: Derr Steel Erection Company

The Renaissance Nashville Hotel is a hotel in Nashville, Tennessee. The building is 385 feet high with 31 floors. The hotel was physically connected to the Nashville Convention Center until the demolition of the convention center in June 2017. Construction began on the 5th + Broadway complex at the location of the former convention center in early 2018, and the Renaissance Hotel will be located at the northwest corner of that development. The 5th + Broadway complex has a predicted completion date of spring 2020.

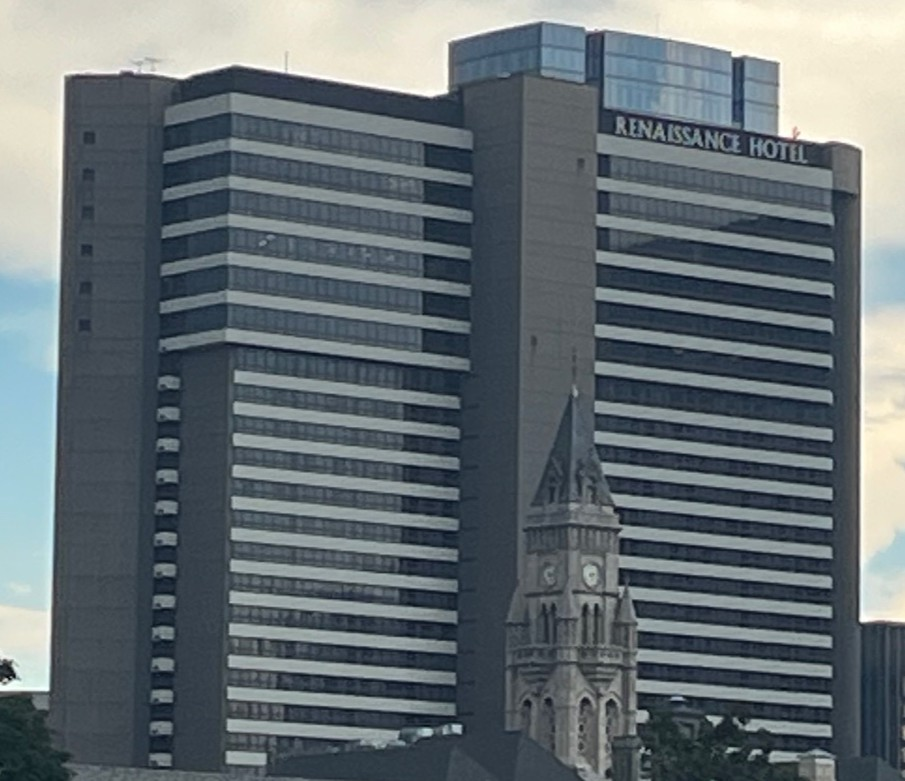
Renaissance hotel in 2026

The hotel contains 649 rooms, 24 suites, 25 meeting rooms with 31,000 sq ft of meeting space, and 2 concierge levels including a Starbucks coffee shop, 2 lounges, and a full-service restaurant. One of the lounges is located in an enclosed bridge walkway, spanning above Commerce Street, which connects the hotel to a parking garage across the street. This walkway was severely damaged during a 1998 tornado in downtown Nashville.

In addition to being a hotel, the building also contains office space in its top 6 floors, this portion being known as CitySpace. These office suites are serviced by a separate bank of elevators accessible on the third floor.

The hotel opened in 1987 as the Stouffer Nashville Hotel. It became the Stouffer Renaissance Nashville Hotel in 1993 and then the Renaissance Nashville Hotel in 1996.

== See also ==
- List of tallest buildings in Nashville
