= Sheraton Nashville Downtown =

Hotel in Nashville, Tennessee

Sheraton Nashville Downtown Hotel
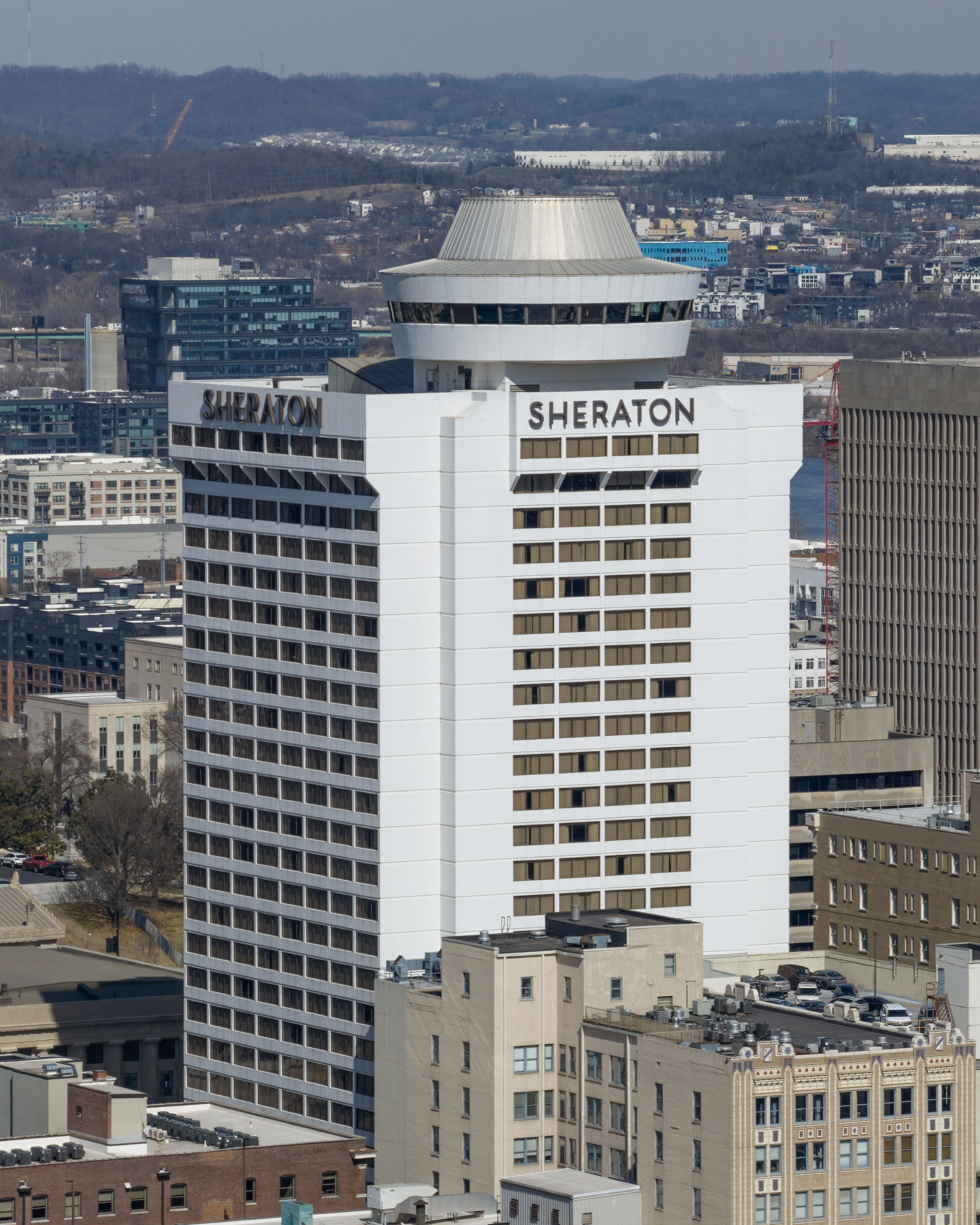
- Interactive map of the Sheraton Nashville Downtown Hotel area

General information
- Status: Completed
- Type: Hotel
- Architectural style: Brutalist
- Location: 623 Union Street; Nashville, Tennessee; United States
- Coordinates: 36°9′48.15″N 86°46′59.27″W
- Opening: 1975
- Owner: Sheraton Hotels and Resorts

Height
- Roof: 300 ft (91 m)

Technical details
- Floor count: 27

Design and construction
- Architects: John Mastin & Associates

The Sheraton Nashville Downtown Hotel is a high-rise hotel and restaurant in downtown Nashville, Tennessee. Sheraton Nashville Downtown’s multimillion-dollar transformation was conceptualized by New York–based designer Anna Busta. The Sheraton is the 41st tallest building in Nashville, with 27 stories and a height of 300 ft (91 m).

It is notable on the Nashville skyline for its prominent rooftop.

In August 2012, the hotel was acquired by the JRK Hotel Group, a subsidiary of JRK Property Holdings.

== See also ==
- List of tallest buildings in Nashville
