= List of tallest buildings in Nashville =

Skyline of Nashville
- Downtown Nashville and the Cumberland River
- Tallest building: 333 Commerce (1994)
- Tallest building height: 617 ft (188.1 m)
- First 150 m+ building: 333 Commerce

Number of tall buildings (2026)
- Taller than 100 m (328 ft): 32 + 1 T/O (Note: Topped-out.)
- Taller than 150 m (492 ft): 4

Number of tall buildings — feet
- Taller than 300 ft (91.4 m): 40 + 2 T/O

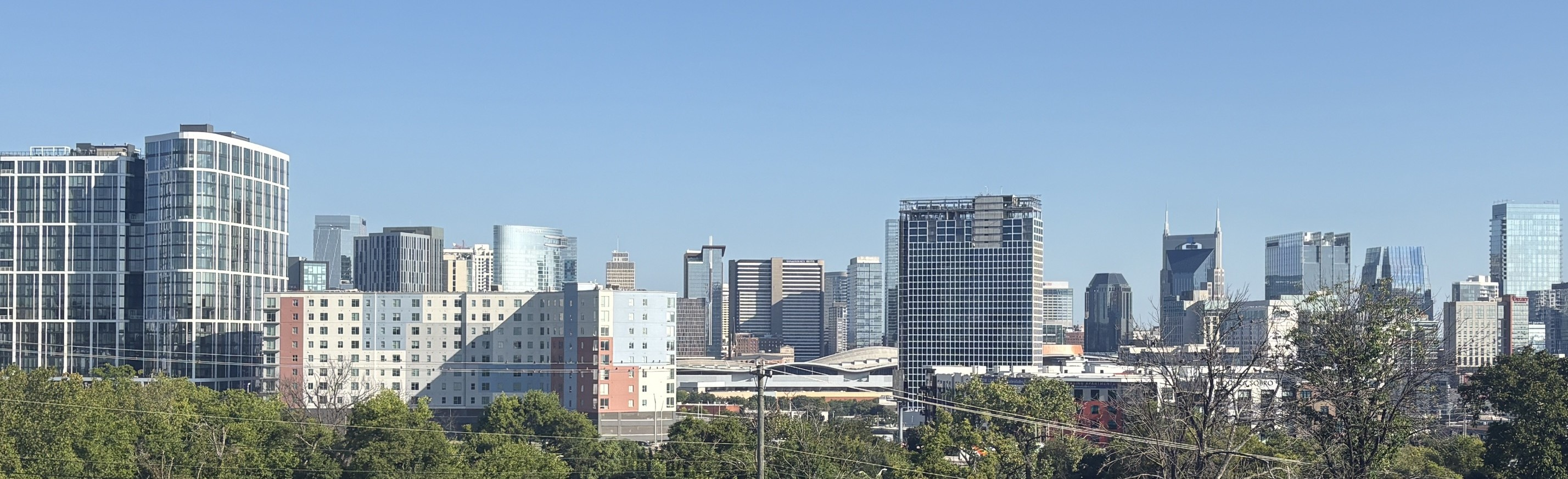
Nashville in 2026 looking northeast

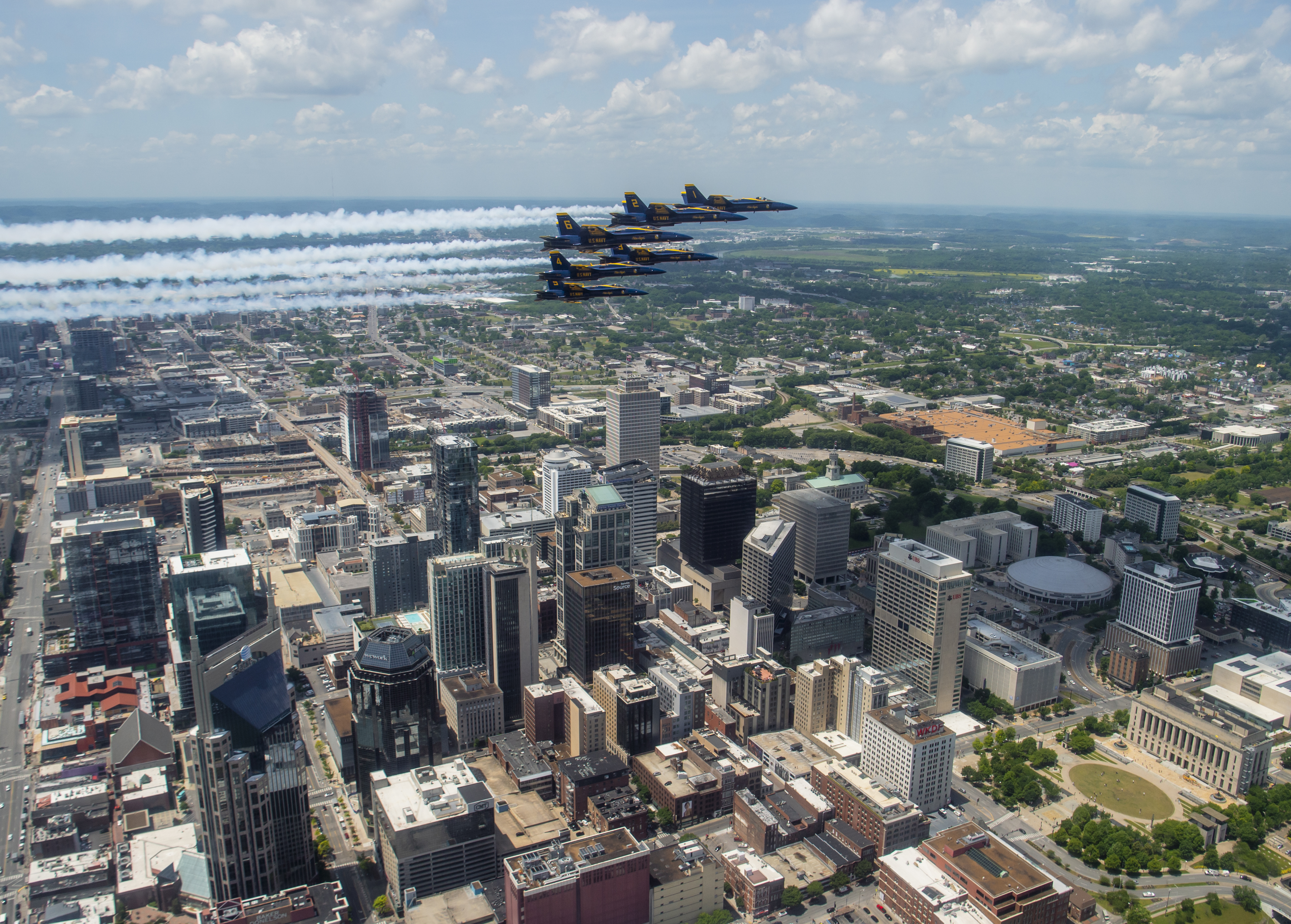
US Navy Blue Angels over downtown in 2020

Nashville is the capital and largest city in the U.S state of Tennessee, with a metropolitan area of 2.2 million people. Nashville is home to 42 buildings (two of which remain under construction but are topped out) with a height of 300 feet (91 meters) or greater as of late 2026. Four of those towers are taller than 492 feet (150 m). The tallest building in the city (and the state) is 333 Commerce, formerly and still commonly known as the AT&T Building, which rises 617 feet (188 m) in downtown Nashville and was completed in 1994. However, a 750-foot (228.6 m) tower called Paramount will assume the title of the tallest building in Nashville and Tennessee upon its 2028 construction completion. Since the early 2010s, Nashville has been undergoing an unprecedented skyscraper boom, as 26 high-rises were built from 2009 to 2025.

High-rise buildings first appeared in Nashville with the construction of the 12-story First National Bank Building (now the Downtown Courtyard Hotel) in 1905. The city's skyline remained short until the completion of the modernist Life & Casualty Tower in 1957. At 409 ft (125 m), it was much taller than any other building in Nashville at the time. From the 1970s to the mid-1990s, the city added several office and hotel skyscrapers downtown. In 1994, 333 Commerce was completed. It is still commonly known today as the "Batman Building" due to its appearance.

The 2010s and 2020s saw a construction boom in downtown and Midtown, with notable high-rises including the second, third, and fourth tallest buildings in the city: Four Seasons Hotel and Residences, 505, and The Pinnacle at Nashville Yards respectively. Downtown's most significant development is Nashville Yards, a 19-acre mixed-use development consisting of several high-rises, including two developed by Amazon. Construction on Nashville's new tallest building began in 2025; it is expected to be completed in 2028, surpassing 333 Commerce as Nashville's tallest building at 750 ft (229 m).

Most of Nashville's high-rises are located in downtown, west and southwest of the Cumberland River that runs through the heart of the city. Before the 2010s, the core of the skyline was found north of Broadway and east of Rosa L Parks Boulevard in the central business district; since then, the skyline has expanded southwards and westwards, and many neighborhoods such as SoBro, Midtown, and The Gulch have been transformed. The rapid growth has also made way for new urban nodes, such as Nashville Yards in the CBD and the development of the East Bank. The Gulch specifically has seen the most growth, from being a neighborhood with many low-rise and underutilized buildings to becoming one of the most popular neighborhoods in Nashville with many high rises in the area. The skyline has also extended past Interstate 40 into Midtown, with projects like the proposed The Sinclair, West End Tower in Vanderbilt University and the two-tower Broadwest development reshaping Midtown. The neighborhood offers multiple buildings standing 200 to 300 feet tall, with the tallest being the hotel-condo Broadwest tower, at 404 feet tall.

== History ==
Number of buildings by height in Nashville by the end of each year, based on the list below. Click on the legend to toggle a specific height on or off. View chart definition.

== Cityscape ==
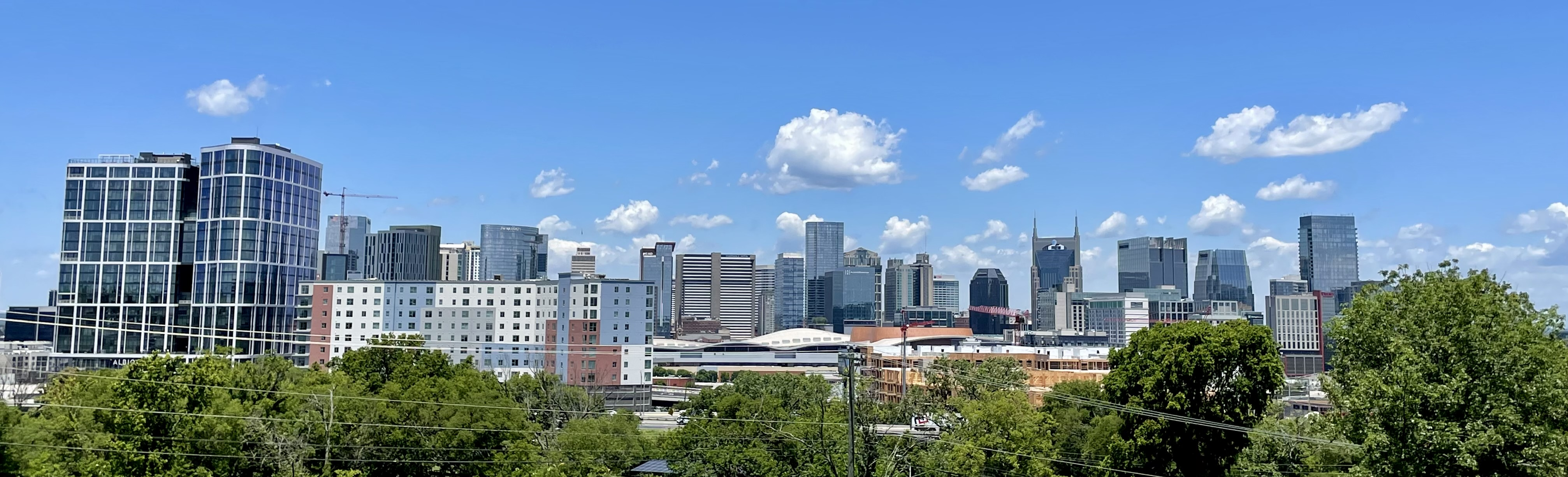
Skyline of Nashville in 2024 (Use cursor to identify buildings)

== Map of tallest buildings ==
The map below shows the location of every building taller than 300 feet (91 m) in Nashville. Each marker is numbered by the building's height rank, and colored by the decade of its completion.

All buildings taller than 300 ft (91 m) in Nashville.
- 1950s and before
- 1960s
- 1970s
- 1980s
- 1990s
- 2000s
- 2010s
- 2020s
1 333 Commerce
2 Four Seasons Hotel and Residences
3 505
4 The Pinnacle at Nashville Yards
5 Fifth Third Center
6 Prime
7 William R. Snodgrass Tennessee Tower
8 Bridgestone Tower
9 Amazon Tower Two
10 The Emory
11 Alcove
12 Symphony Place
13 The Place at Fifth + Broadway
14 Life & Casualty Tower
15 The Everett
16 Conrad Hotel and Residences
17 Nashville City Center
18 James K. Polk State Office Building
19 JW Marriott Nashville
20 Renaissance Nashville Hotel
21 1 Hotel and Embassy Suites
22 Viridian Tower
23 805 Lea
24 501 Commerce
25 One22One
26 Ray Nashville
27 One Nashville Place
28 UBS Tower
29 Albion Music Row
30 The Pullman at Gulch Union
31 SoBro
32 Amazon Tower One
33 222 2nd Avenue South
34 Broadwest Office Tower
35 Modera McGavock
36 Olive at Peabody Union
37 1200 Broadway
38 Westin Music City
39 Grand Hyatt Nashville
40 West End Tower
41 Sheraton Nashville Downtown
42 The Motley Tower 1

== Tallest buildings ==
This list ranks completed buildings in Nashville that stand at least 300 feet (91 m) as of 2026, based on standard height measurement. This includes spires and architectural details but does not include antenna masts. The “Year” column indicates the year of completion. Buildings tied in height are sorted by year of completion, and then alphabetically.

Was the tallest building in Nashville upon completion
Topped out but not yet completed

Rank	Name	Image	Location	Height ft (m)	Floors	Year	Purpose	Notes
1	333 Commerce		Downtown 36°09′45″N 86°46′37″W	617 (188.1)	33	1994	Office	Tallest building in Nashville and the state of Tennessee. Formerly and still commonly known as the AT&T Building. Also nicknamed The Batman Building due to its roof and spires resembling the Batman symbol. Tallest building completed in Nashville in the 1990s.
2	Four Seasons Hotel and Residences		SoBro 36°09′37″N 86°46′25″W	542 (165.2)	40	2022	Mixed-use	Mixed-use hotel and residential building. Located at 151 First Avenue South, the skyscraper offers 236 hotel rooms in addition to private residences. Tallest building completed in Nashville in the 2020s so far.
3	505		Downtown 36°09′46″N 86°46′49″W	535 (163)	46	2018	Residential	Tallest residential building in Tennessee. Tallest building completed in Nashville in the 2010s.
4	The Pinnacle at Nashville Yards	The Pinnacle headquarters at Nashville Yards	Downtown 36°09′35″N 86°47′08″W	504 (153.6)	37	2025	Office	The tallest high-rise in the multi-tower Nashville Yards project.
5	Prime		Downtown 36°09′41″N 86°47′03″W	456 (139)	39	2024	Residential	One of the two Giarratana Towers.
6	William R. Snodgrass Tennessee Tower	Tennessee_Tower_seen_down_Deaderick_St	Downtown 36°09′50″N 86°47′06″W	452 (137.8)	31	1970	Office	Originally the National Life Center. Tallest building in Nashville from 1970 to 1994. Tallest building completed in Nashville in the 1970s.
7	Bridgestone Tower		SoBro 36°09′32″N 86°46′31″W	444 (135.2)	31	2017	Office	The headquarters of Bridgestone for the Americas. Also known as Bridgestone Americas Tower.
8	Fifth Third Center		Downtown 36°09′50″N 86°46′49″W	490 (149.5)	30	1986	Office	Originally known as the Third National Financial Center. Tallest building completed in Nashville in the 1980s.
9	Amazon Tower Two		Downtown 36°09′41″N 86°47′13″W	420 (128)	28	2023	Office	One of two towers located in the Nashville Yards mixed-use development. Houses Amazon's Operations Center of Excellence.
10	The Emory		Downtown 36°09′36″N 86°47′03″W	420 (128)	35	2025	Residential	One of multiple Nashville Yards residential towers. Offers for-purchase condos.
11	Alcove		Downtown 36°09′42″N 86°47′06″W	419 (127.8)	34	2023	Residential	First of three Giarratana-led residential towers located on the fringe of the Nashville Yards development. Tallest for-rent residential building in Tennessee
12	Symphony Place		SoBro 36°09′37″N 86°46′29″W	417 (127.1)	29	2010	Office	Also known as The Pinnacle at Symphony Place. Formerly the headquarters of Pinnacle Financial Partners.
13	The Place at Fifth + Broadway		Downtown 36°09′38″N 86°46′48″W	415 (126.5)	34	2020	Residential	Located across the Ryman Auditorium, Fifth+Broadway is a residential skyscraper with a shopping mall and food court at ground level.
14	Life & Casualty Tower		Downtown 36°09′48″N 86°46′45″W	409 (124.7)	30	1957	Office	Commonly referred to as the L & C Tower, and is considered a quality example of modernist high-rise design. Tallest building in Nashville from 1957 to 1970. Tallest building completed in Nashville in the 1950s.
15	The Everett		Downtown 36°09′35″N 86°47′05″W	409 (124.7) (Note: Sources do not state the exact height of this building. This figure was determined using Google Earth by subtracting the altitude of the building's lowest main pedestrian open-air entrance from its highest architectural point.)	34	2025	Residential	The smaller of two residential twin towers in Nashville Yards.
16	Conrad Hotel and Residences		Midtown 36°09′16″N 86°47′40″W	404 (123)	34	2022	Mixed-use	Tallest building in Midtown. Part of the Broadwest development and located at 1600 West End Avenue, this building offers a 14-floor hotel component in addition to 220 condominiums. Also known as The Residences at Broadwest.
17	Nashville City Center	Nashville_City_Center_1	Downtown 36°09′50″N 86°46′54″W	402 (122.5)	27	1988	Office	19th tallest building in Tennessee.
18	James K. Polk State Office Building		Downtown 36°09′53″N 86°46′54″W	392 (119.5)	24	1981	Office	Office tower in the Capitol Hill neighborhood.
19	JW Marriott Nashville	JW Marriott Nashville during a storm (cropped)	SoBro 36°09′23″N 86°46′52″W	386 (117.6)	35	2018	Hotel	23rd tallest building in Tennessee.
20	Renaissance Nashville Hotel		Downtown 36°09′39″N 86°46′52″W	385 (117.3)	35	1987	Hotel	Hotel located near the heart of Broadway.
21	1 Hotel and Embassy Suites		SoBro 36°09′27″N 86°46′49″W	384 (117)	26	2022	Residential	Located across Demonbreun Street from the Nashville Convention Center, the Embassy Suites building is one of three hotel structures sitting adjacent to one another (with 1 Hotel and Cambria Hotel as the two others).
22	Viridian Tower		Downtown 36°09′47″N 86°46′46″W	378 (115.2)	31	2006	Residential	Tallest building completed in Nashville in the 2000s.
23	805 Lea		SoBro 36°09′14″N 86°46′48″W	370 (112.7)	31	2021	Residential	Located in downtown's SoBro district, this tower offers 354 residential units.
24	501 Commerce		Downtown 36°09′41″N 86°46′46″W	361 (110)	26	2020	Office	Includes office space for AllianceBernstein, also features a walking path on the roof.
25	One22One		The Gulch 36°09′21″N 86°47′18″W	360 (109.7)	26	2023	Office	Located at Broadway, the One22One features 373,000 square feet of class AA Office space. The façade also has a striking resemblance to the upcoming Paramount Tower by Giarratana.
26	Ray Nashville		Pie Town 36°09′11″N 86°46′34″W	360 (109.7)	32	2027	Mixed-use	Located at 601 Lafayette St. in downtown's Pie Town, this skyscraper will offer 411 residential units, 373 parking spaces, and 6,000 square feet of retail. Topped out and nearing full skinning, with interior work underway since mid 2026.
27	One Nashville Place		Downtown 36°09′46″N 86°46′41″W	359 (109.4)	23	1985	Office	Also referred to as the R2-D2 building by locals because of the building's facade.
28	UBS Tower	UBS_Tower	Downtown 36°09′57″N 86°46′47″W	354 (107.9)	28	1974	Office	originally called the First American Center.
29	Albion Music Row		Midtown 36°09′18″N 86°47′23″W	350 (106.7)	29	2026	Residential	Located at 14th Avenue South and McGavock Street in Midtown, the building is the taller of two residential towers planned for the site and offers 458 units.
30	The Pullman at Gulch Union		The Gulch 36°09′17″N 86°47′13″W	348 (106)	31	2024	Residential	Located at 1222 Demonbreun.
31	SoBro		SoBro 36°09′34″N 86°46′26″W	345 (105.2)	32	2016	Residential	Also known as Placemaker Premier SoBro.
32	Amazon Tower One		Downtown 36°09′39″N 86°47′12″W	344 (105)	21	2020	Office	Located at 1010 Church Street, in the Nashville Yards Development, this is the first of two towers developed for Amazon's Operations Center of Excellence.
33	222 2nd Avenue South		SoBro 36°09′35″N 86°46′24″W	326 (99.4)	26	2017	Office	Features an outdoor terrace, as well as a fitness center.
34	Broadwest Office Tower		Midtown 36°09′17″N 86°47′36″W	325 (99)	21	2022	Office	Located at 1600 West End Avenue in the Broadwest development, this tower offers 21 floors of class A office space.
35	Modera McGavock		The Gulch 36°09′20″N 86°47′17″W	325 (99)	29	2025	Residential	Features 396 units with 12,000 square feet of retail.
36	Olive at Peabody Union		SoBro 36°09′32″N 86°46′10″W	325 (99) (Note: This figure is an approximate height.)	27	2025	Residential	Located at 30 Peabody Street, the tower sits adjacent to a six-story office building owned by Eakin Partners and completed in 2019.
37	1200 Broadway		The Gulch 36°09′24″N 86°47′17″W	324 (98.8)	26	2019	Mixed-use	This office and residential mixed-use high-rise offers a ground-level Whole Foods grocery store, as well as iHeartMedia's second headquarters for digital media.
38	Westin Music City		SoBro 36°09′18″N 86°46′51″W	323 (98.5)	27	2016	Hotel	Includes 454 guest rooms, as well as a rooftop pool on the 27th floor.
39	Grand Hyatt Nashville		Downtown 36°09′29″N 86°47′06″W	305 (93)	25	2020	Hotel	First building completed in Nashville Yards, featuring many hotel rooms and restaurants off of Broadway.
40	West End Tower		West End 36°08′49″N 86°48′26″W	305 (93)	20	2021	Residential	Located on the western edge of the Vanderbilt University campus and overlooking West End Avenue. The Collegiate Gothic-style building features student apartments.
41	Sheraton Nashville Downtown	Sheraton_Nashville	Downtown 36°09′48″N 86°46′59″W	300 (91.4)	27	1975	Hotel	Located at 623 Union Street.
42	The Motley Tower One		Midtown 36°09′27″N 86°47′30″W	300 (91)	26	2027	Residential	Located at 1401 Church St (14th and Church), this is the first of a planned three-tower residential complex collectively called The Motley. The building, topped as of September 2026, will offer 326 units and 1,400 square feet of retail space.

== Tallest under construction or proposed ==
=== Under construction ===
The following table ranks buildings under construction in Nashville that are expected to be at least 300 ft (91 m) tall as of 2026, based on standard height measurement. The “Year” column indicates the expected year of completion. Buildings that are on hold are not included.

Architecturally topped out but not yet completed

Name	Image	Height ft (m)	Floors	Year	Purpose	Notes
Paramount Tower		750 (229)	60	2028	Residential	Will become the tallest building in Nashville and Tennessee upon completion. Located at 1010 Church Street. Nashville based Giarratana Development is developing the site with the 500-unit residential skyscraper. In early August 2025, the company landed a $340 million loan and full-scale construction began in early September 2025.
Pendry Hotel and Residences		388 (118)	30	2027	Mixed-use	Mixed-use residential and hotel building. Full scale work started in July 2025.
Nashville EDITION Hotel & Residences		355 (108)	28	2027	Mixed-use	Scale, use, and height have been updated as 12 floors were added to the project and will now include both the hotel and condominiums. Full scale construction is currently underway.
Voce		303 (92)	25	2027	Mixed-use	To be located at 1717 Hayes in Midtown and will include 194 condo units and 60,000 sq. ft. of office. Preliminary site work was undertaken in late 2024 and $130 million construction loan has been secured. Construction started in December of 2025. The structure is fully above grade as of mid-2026.

=== Proposed ===
This table ranks approved and proposed skyscrapers in Nashville that are planned to be at least 300 ft (91 m) tall as of 2026, based on standard height measurement. The “Year” column indicates the expected year of completion. A dash “–“ indicates information about the building is unknown or has not been released.

Name	Height ft (m)	Floors	Year	Purpose	Status	Notes
St. Regis Hotel and Condominiums	651 (198)	46	–	Mixed-use	Approved	Mixed-use residential and hotel building. To be built on the parking lot next to the JW Marriott.
319 Peabody St.	636 (194)	53	2028	Mixed-use	Approved	Mixed-use residential and hotel building. The tower is slated to offer 405 hotel rooms, 104 condos, and around 11,000 square feet of retail space. Chicago-based DAC Developments paid $22 million for the site in March 2026, with groundbreaking happening in late 2026.
Ritz Carlton Hotel & Residences	569 (173)	46	–	Mixed-use	Proposed	Mixed-use residential and hotel building. Site at 12th and Demonbreun being eyed for project that previously was planned for SoBro Roundabout.
11 North, Tower One	525 (160)	47	2033	Residential	Proposed	Tallest of three residential towers planned for a 10 year build out.
51 Platform South	513 (156)	36	-	Office	Proposed	Originally proposed at 43 stories; the current proposal has significantly increased square footage.
The Motley, Tower Three	500 (152)	44	–	Residential	Proposed	Four tower project at the old dairy processing lot in midtown.
The Autograph Hotel by White Lodging	485 (148)	35	2028	Hotel	Approved	Will be developed by a firm from Indiana. Located across the street from the JW Marriott Hotel and Music City Center.
531 Second Ave., Tower One	433 (132)	36	–	Residential	Approved	531 Second ave. The Boston developer who is developing the 40 story Four Seasons hotel. The developer has downgraded to 38 stories now 36 stories and has added a 18-story building to the proposal.
Hilton Signia	418 (127)	34	–	Hotel	Proposed	Nashville Yards master developer Southwest Value Partners is hoping to develop this site with what would be downtown’s largest hotel by room count (817).
10th & Clark Residential, Tower One	409 (125)	37	–	Residential	Proposed	10th + Clark Residential will be a two tower project. Tower one will stand 37 stories/409’ and yield 414 units. The site encompasses 2.16 acres at 810 Lea Ave. and 905 Clark Place, just to the west of The Westin Hotel.
Rutledge Hill, Tower Two	400 (122)	35	–	Residential	Proposed	Tallest of a three tower project proposed for a new culinary arts district in Southbank.
The Motley, Tower Two	393 (120)	32	–	Residential	Proposed	Four tower project at the old dairy processing lot in midtown.
531 Second Ave. Tower Two	375 (114)	32	–	Residential	Approved	Located at 531 Second ave.
901 Dr Martin Luther King Blvd	375 (114)	33	–	Residential	Approved	A proposed Tony Giarratana residential tower that will offer an affordable housing component.
Gulch Union Tower Three	372 (113)	28	–	Residential	Approved	Located at 1207 McGavock Street. Demolition of the existing building on the site is in progress.
10th & Clark Residential, Tower 2	354 (108)	34	–	Residential	Proposed	10th + Clark Residential will be a two tower project. Tower Two will stand 32 stories/354’ and yield 354 units. The site encompasses 2.16 acres at 810 Lea Ave. and 905 Clark Place, just to the west of The Westin Hotel.
Paseo South Gulch, Tower Four	350 (107)	22	–	Residential	Proposed	Part of the Paseo South development that will include plans of 1,500 parking spaces, 396 units, 11,180 of retail square feet.
125 11th Ave North Tower	322 (98)	26	2027	Residential	Proposed	125 11th Ave. North will be a 26-story, 322' residential tower featuring 387 units, 17,000 sq. ft. of ground level restaurant/retail, and an internal garage (2 levels below grade, 2 above) with about 425 spaces. It is being developed by Flank, Inc., and will serve as a companion tower to their 21-story Gibson Residences currently under construction directly to the west. There will be an upper patio/plaza that connects the two over Comer's Alley and fronting the Church Street Viaduct.
11 North, Tower Two	313 (95)	28	2033	Residential	Proposed	Second tallest of a three tower residential project with 1,475 total units.
11 North, Tower Three	311 (95)	29	2033	Residential	Proposed	Third of a three tower residential project off Church St with a total of 1,475 units.
The Sinclair	306 (93)	27	–	Mixed Use	On Hold	Would be across the Street from West End Tower at Vanderbilt. The height for the building was originally planned to be 375 feet (114 m).

== Timeline of tallest buildings ==
This lists buildings that once held the title of tallest building in Nashville. The first skyscraper in the city was the First National Bank Building, now the Courtyard Hotel, from 1905 until 1908. This table excludes the Tennessee State Capitol, which if counted, would have been the tallest building in Tennessee at 206.6 ft (63.0 m) tall from 1859 to 1957.

Name	Image	Street address	Years as tallest	Height ft (m)	Floors	Ref.
First National Bank Building		170 Fourth Avenue North	1905–1908	170 (52)	12	
The Stahlman		211 Union Street	1908–1957	180 (55)	12	
Life & Casualty Tower		401 Church Street	1957–1970	409 (125)	30	
William R. Snodgrass Tennessee Tower	Tennessee_Tower_seen_down_Deaderick_St	312 Rosa L. Parks Boulevard	1970–1994	452 (138)	31	
333 Commerce		333 Commerce Street	1994–present	617 (188)	33	
