= Lake Palmer =

Former lake in Nashville, Tennessee, United States

- Location within Tennessee Location within the United States
- Location: 1600 West End Avenue; Nashville, Tennessee; United States
- Coordinates: 36.1545°N 86.7935°W
- Built: 2005
- Max. length: 400 feet (120 m)
- Max. width: 300 feet (91 m)
- Average depth: 60 feet (18 m)
Broadwest
- Interactive map of the Broadwest area
General information
- Status: Proposal
- Type: Mixed use
- Cost: $490 million USD
- Owner: Propst Development
Height
- Roof: 406 ft (124 m)
Technical details
- Floor count: Residential/hotel tower, 34 stories; office tower, 21 stories, 510,000 sq ft (47,000 m^{2}); retail/office building, 125,000 sq ft (11,600 m^{2})
- Floor area: 900,000 sq ft (84,000 m^{2}).
Design and construction
- Architects: Kendall/Heaton Associates Inc. Duda/Paine Architects; Cooper Carry
- Developer: Propst Development, Chartwell Hospitality
- Structural engineer: Stanley D. Lindsey & Associates
- Main contractor: Bovis Lend Lease (2006-2008) Turner Construction Company (2013–2017) Batson-Cook Construction (2017–2018) Turner Construction Company and Hoar Construction (2018–)

Lake Palmer was a man-made lake in Nashville between 16th Ave and 17th Ave, south of Hayes St and north of West End Ave. This was the proposed location of a long-mooted mixed-use construction project near downtown Nashville that failed to materialize for over ten years. Conceived by Nashville-based Alex S. Palmer & Company, the project was originally planned to open in 2007 as the West End Summit, a $300 million project for office space and apartments.

Excavation initially started in 2005, but the project stalled due to the 2008 financial crisis. The developer sought an anchor tenant for the office portion of the project. The resulting lake was a source of water for swimming pools and country clubs during water restrictions following the 2010 Tennessee floods. The construction proposal was relaunched in September, 2012 with news that Nashville-headquartered Hospital Corporation of America (HCA) had signed leases to occupy two office towers on the site. In addition to the office towers, an InterContinental Hotel was planned as part of the development. After plans stalled, the property was sold to Propst Development in March, 2018.

The site remained a massive, block-long excavation that was commonly called Lake Palmer, as this 85-foot-deep (26 m) hole was mostly filled with water. As of September 2019, the lake was still visible on Google Maps and labelled as Lake Palmer.

== West End Summit ==
On September 27, 2012, Nashville Mayor Karl Dean, Gov. Bill Haslam, and HCA Chairman and CEO Richard Bracken, jointly announced the location of two corporate headquarters divisions of HCA at the site. The proposed development was to include two towers of approximately 20 stories each, with a total floor area of 900,000 sq ft (84,000 m^{2}). The corporate headquarters of Parallon Business Solutions would anchor one tower, and the other would be anchored by Sarah Cannon Research Institute (SCRI). The rainwater was completely drained (mostly into the street) in 2013 for the anticipated construction of the HCA building.

More than a year after HCA signed leases, construction had failed to start due to Alex S. Palmer & Company being unable to obtain equity financing for the $275 million project. In December 2013, HCA withdrew from the project, opting to build its own campus on a nearby site in Nashville's North Gulch district. The excavation filled back up with water.

Intercontinental Hotels withdrew their 12-story hotel proposal in February 2016. The lake was again temporarily drained in March 2016, although no further proposal was revealed.

=== Criticism ===
The failed West End Summit project, along with developer Alex S. Palmer & Company, faced public and media scrutiny because of its numerous construction delays, financing woes and construction liens. Harmon Inc. filed a lawsuit stating it was owed US$120,000 by Alex S. Palmer & Company and Bovis Lend Lease for engineering services related to the project.

== Broadwest ==
On March 23, 2018, Huntsville, Alabama-based Propst Development announced they had purchased Lake Palmer for $36.9 million. The announcement did not include detailed plans for the site. Propst Development principal Chris Brown stated on June 27, 2018, that the mixed-use project would include a hotel and condos in a tower as high as 40 stories, and that another tower would include at least 500,000 sq ft (46,000 m^{2}) of office space. Turner Construction Company returned jointly with Hoar Construction as contractors, and Cooper Carry was named as the firm providing architecture for the renamed "Broadwest" project. On August 20, 2018, Brown told the Nashville Business Journal that the residential tower would be 34 stories and the office tower would be 21 stories, with a projected cost of $490 million entirely funded by the Propst family and Chartwell Hospitality, a hotel operator based in Franklin, Tennessee. The hotel in the residential tower would open in 2021 with 245 rooms, and be owner-operated by Chartwell Hospitality. The plan included a park, and 2,500 vehicle parking spaces. Construction was expected to start in the fall of 2018.

The first of four tower cranes was erected in March 2019. The 21-story office tower is planned to open in February 2021, and the 34-story residential tower is planned to open about six months later.

== See also ==
- List of tallest buildings in Nashville
