= Life & Casualty Tower =

Skyscraper in Nashville, Tennessee

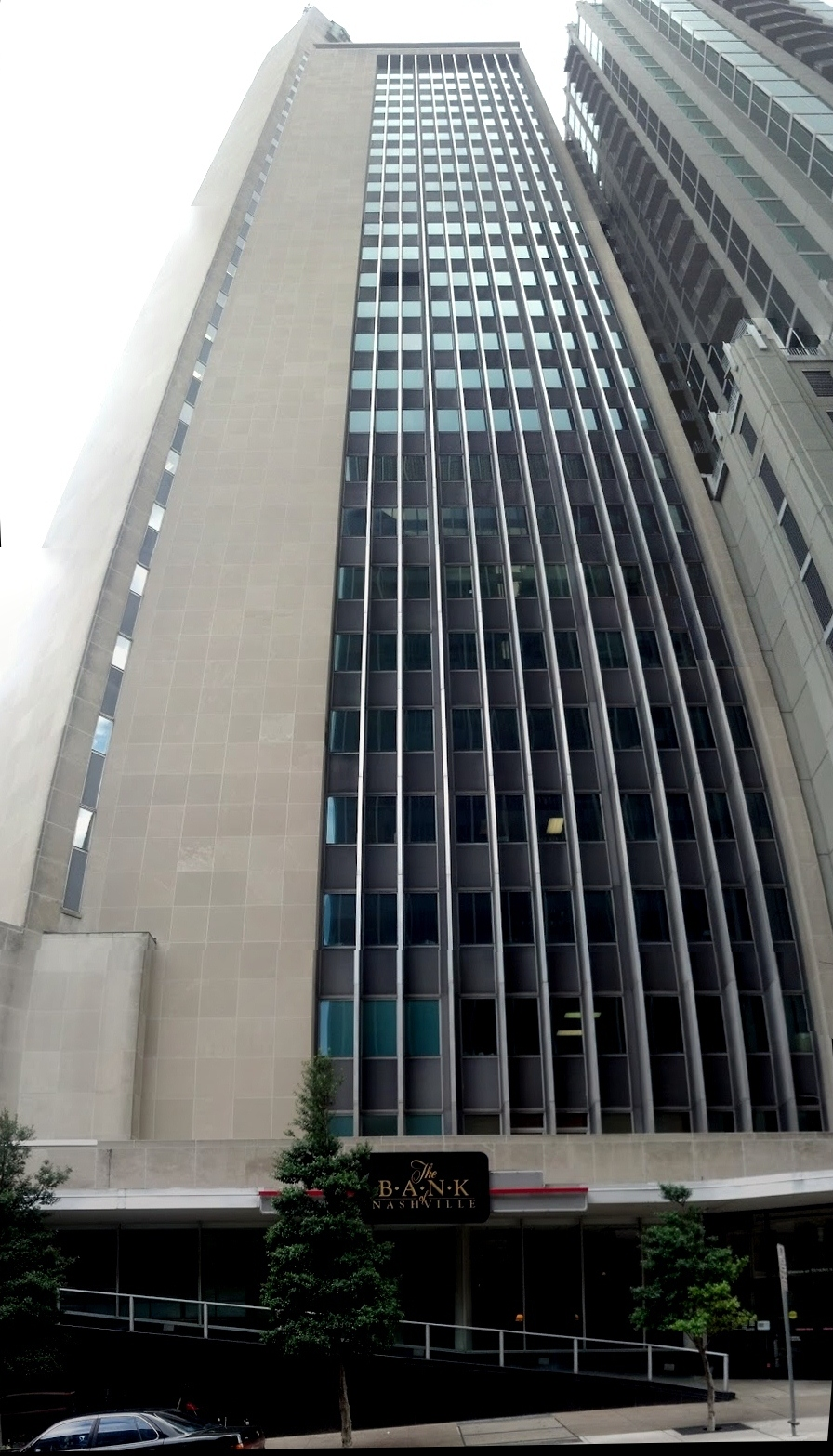
- Main entrance, pictured in 2012
- Interactive map of the Life & Casualty Tower area

General information
- Type: Office
- Location: 401 Church Street; Nashville, Tennessee; United States
- Coordinates: 36°09′49″N 86°46′45″W
- Completed: 1957

Height
- Antenna spire: 500 feet (150 m)
- Roof: 410 feet (120 m)

Technical details
- Floor count: 30
- Floor area: 831,394 sq ft (77,239.0 m^{2})

Design and construction
- Architect: Edwin A. Keeble
- Structural engineer: Ross Bryan Associates
- Main contractor: Henry C. Beck Company

The Life & Casualty Tower (also known as the L & C Tower) is a skyscraper in Nashville, Tennessee, located at 401 Church Street. It stands 409 feet (125 m) and has 30 floors. It was designed by Edwin A. Keeble, with structural engineering done by Ross Bryan Associates, and was finished in 1957. It was Nashville's first true skyscraper and the tallest building in Tennessee until 1965, when 100 North Main Street in Memphis surpassed it.

Exterior materials are limestone, granite, and bright green glass windows. Intersecting curves and angles at the building's base focus attention on the entrance, which angles out to the corner of Church Street and 4th Avenue.

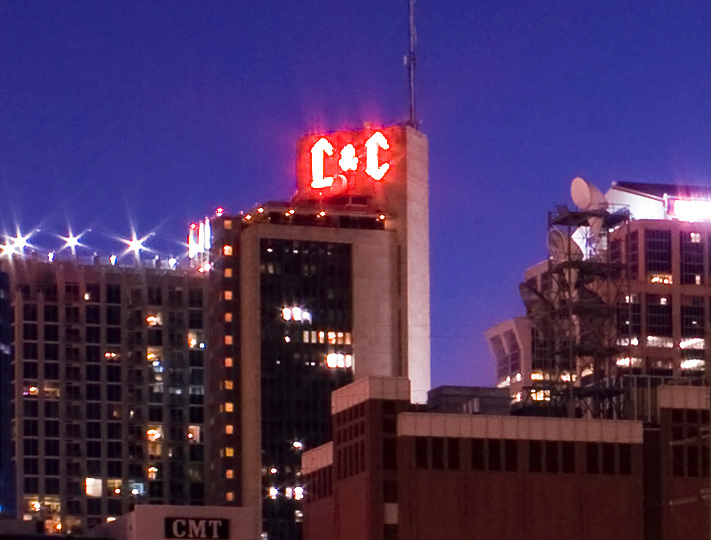
The tower's weather beacon (pictured in 2009)

In the building's early days, the L&C sign at its apex functioned as a weather beacon, changing color to indicate the weather forecast.

== History ==
The Life & Casualty tower was constructed as the new headquarters for the Life and Casualty Insurance Company of Tennessee and other tenants. The company's headquarters were previously located adjacent to the building. The building was topped out on February 23, 1956. Tenants began moving into the building in early 1957, and it was dedicated by Tennessee Governor Frank G. Clement and officially opened on April 30, 1957. It was the tallest building in Tennessee and the Southeastern United States when it was completed. The building dominated the Nashville skyline until the 1980s. Today, it is surrounded by several buildings of similar heights or taller.

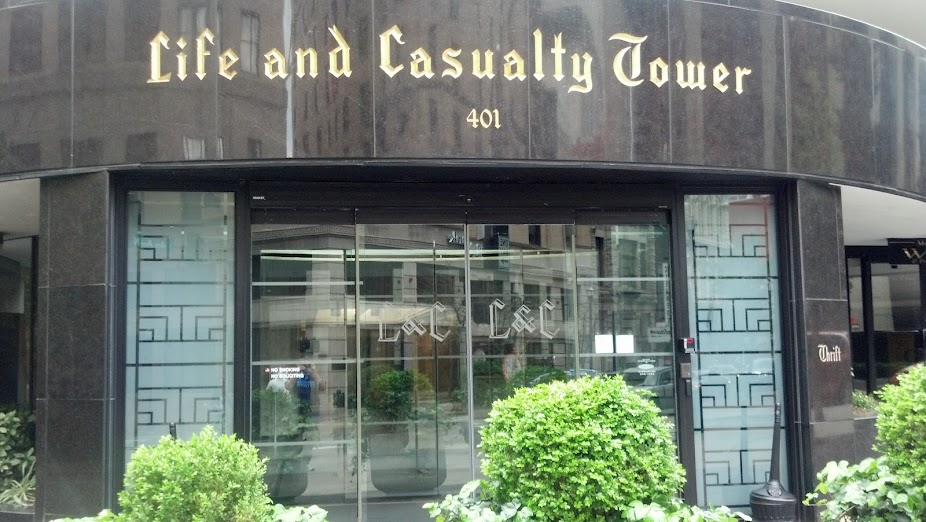
L&C Tower Entrance

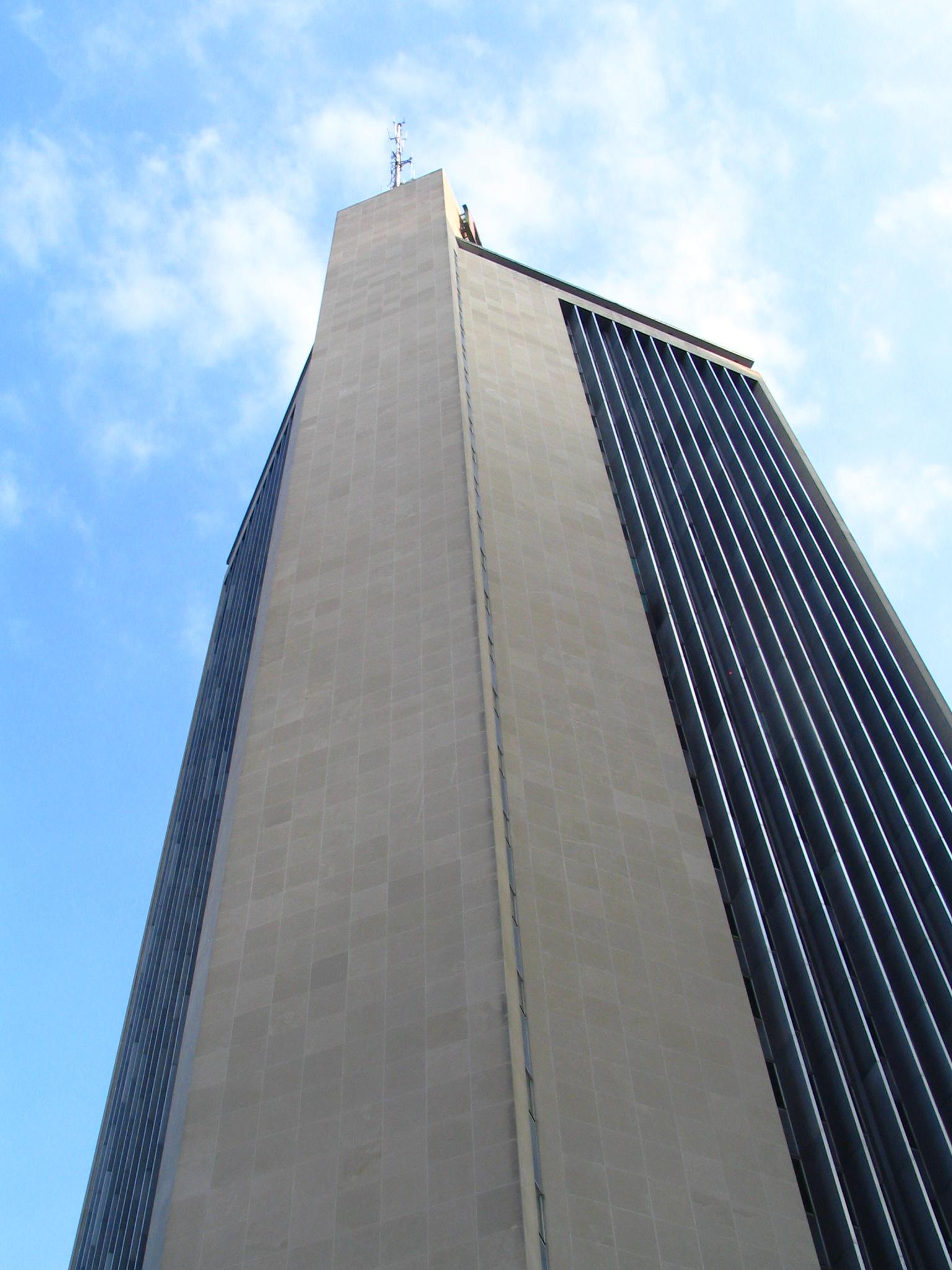
Looking up at the L&C

== See also ==
- Life and Casualty Insurance Company of Tennessee
- List of tallest buildings in Nashville

Preceded by The Stahlman	Tallest Building in Nashville; 1957—1970; 125m	Succeeded by William R. Snodgrass Tennessee Tower
