= Viridian Tower =

Residential skyscraper in Tennessee, US

Viridian Condominiums
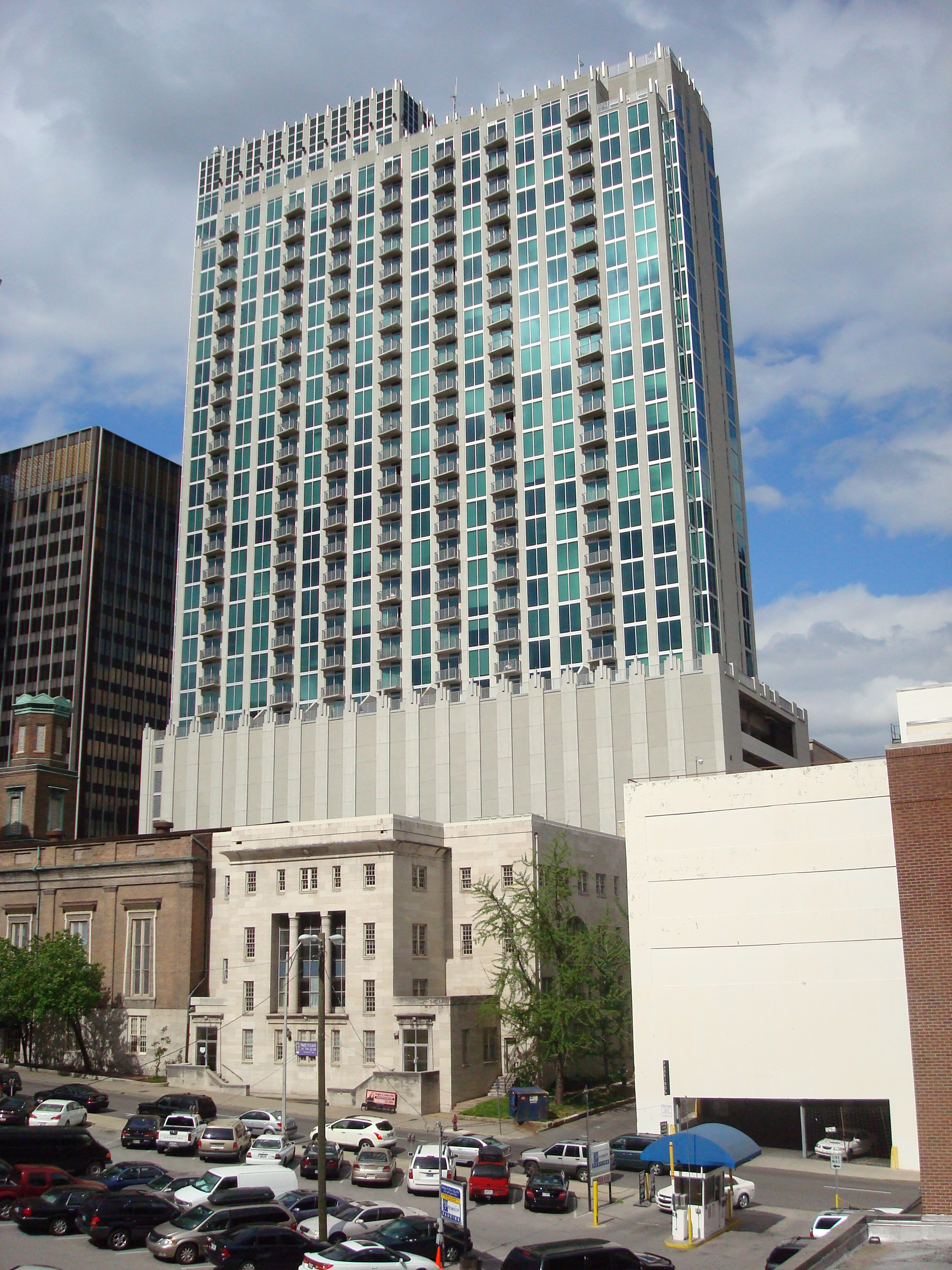
- Interactive map of the Viridian Condominiums area

General information
- Type: Residential
- Location: 415 Church Street; Nashville, Tennessee; United States
- Coordinates: 36°09′48″N 86°46′46″W
- Construction started: October 15, 2004
- Completed: 2006
- Opening: October 1, 2006
- Management: Novare Management

Height
- Roof: 378 ft (115 m)

Technical details
- Floor count: 31
- Lifts/elevators: 4, including 1 service elevator

Design and construction
- Architects: Smallwood, Reynolds, Stewart, Stewart & Associates, Inc.
- Developer: Novare Group, Anthony D. Giarratana
- Main contractor: R.J. Griffin and Co.

The Viridian Tower is a 378-foot (115 m), 31 story skyscraper in Nashville, Tennessee. The building's features include an H.G. Hill grocery store on the bottom floor, rooftop pool, fitness center and clubroom, and secure key card access. In 2007, the building received Project of the Year Award by Urban Land Institute. It is currently the twenty-second tallest building in Nashville.

== See also ==
- List of tallest buildings in Nashville
