= JRK Property Holdings =

Real estate holding and property management company

- Type: Private
- Industry: Property management, real estate, holding company
- Founded: 1991; 35 years ago
- Founder: James Lippman; Robert Rooney; Keith Holmes
- Headquarters: Los Angeles, California, United States
- Key people: Bobby Lee (Chief Executive Officer); Danny Lippman (President); Matt Lippman (COO)
- Total assets: 9 billion+ (2025)
- Number of employees: 700+ (2025)
- Subsidiaries: JRK Hotel Group; JRK Residential Group
- Website: JRK website

JRK Property Holdings is a Los Angeles based real estate holding and property management company. In 2025, JRK was the 50th largest apartment owner in the United States as ranked by the National Multi Housing Council with 26,938 units.

== History ==
The company was founded in 1991 by Jim Lippman, who currently serves as non-executive chairman and Robert Rooney, and Keith Holmes. JRK was created with the purchase of five multifamily properties from an RTC pool of Executive Life assets that Lippman had been managing via receivership. Thirty years later, the company has amassed a commercial portfolio throughout the United States valued in excess of $9 billion and, in 2008, became a member of the National Multifamily Housing Council's NMHC 50 – a list of the nation's fifty largest apartment owners.

=== 2006–2010 ===
In 2006, JRK Property Holdings launched its first investment fund, JRK Birchmont, which was named after Pierce Camp Birchmont. The fund closed oversubscribed at $203 million and focused on value-add multifamily real estate investments. During this period, the company expanded its acquisition strategy, by acquiring a 17-property multifamily portfolio from Apartment Investment and Management Co. (AIMCO) for over $285 million. The transaction, conducted through a joint venture with JRK Birchmont Advisors, spanned multiple U.S. states.

=== 2011–2020 ===
In 2011, JRK acquired five multifamily properties comprising over 1,800 residential units across the Washington D.C., Atlanta, and Dallas–Fort Worth metropolitan areas. The acquisitions totaled approximately $160 million, funded with $50 million in equity from the JRK Multifamily Platform fund and financing from Fannie Mae and Freddie Mac. In the same year, the company was recognized among the top 25 apartment owners in the United States.

By 2014, with continued investments and operations, JRK became the 15th largest multifamily property owner in the United States, managing an apartment portfolio of 53,373 units across 27 states.

=== 2021–present ===
In 2021, JRK acquired five multifamily communities totaling over 1,500 units across Florida, Texas, Louisiana, and Maine, for $390 million. These transactions were conducted through JRK Platform 4 and JRK Multifamily Opportunities II and included properties such as a 266-unit complex in Panama City Beach, Florida, and a 500-unit garden-style development in Portland, Maine. It also acquired MF Communities - Carrington Park at Gulf Pointe, in Houston, TX and Fieldpointe of St. Louis in St. Louis, MO, for $81.5 million. The company also expanded its hospitality portfolio during this time, acquiring and renovating boutique and full-service hotels in locations including Santa Monica, Santa Barbara, San Diego, Palm Springs, San Francisco, New York City, Nashville, Portland Oregon, and Puerto Rico.

In 2023, JRK Property Holdings started deploying $1 billion multifamily fund, JRK Platform 5. JRK is actively acquiring properties through its $1 billion Platform 5 Fund, a multifamily value-add and core-plus vehicle focused on high-quality assets built after 1990 with operational and or physical repositioning opportunities. In January 2024, JRK completed the acquisition of two Hyatt-branded hotels—Hyatt Place and Hyatt House—in San Juan, Puerto Rico, totaling 275 rooms, marking its first hotel acquisitions outside the continental United States. In July 2024, it acquired the Hilton La Jolla Torrey Pines resort in California for $165 million. In the same year, JRK also acquired Class A multifamily communities including Woodbury Park (a 224-unit townhome property outside Minneapolis), 333 Fremont (a high-rise multifamily asset in San Francisco), Brook on Janes (a 288-unit community in suburban Chicago).

== Portfolio ==
The company's portfolio consists of residential, commercial and hotel properties.

=== Hotel properties ===
Through the company's hotel division, JRK Hotel Group, the company operates a number of notable hotels, including Oceana Beach Club Hotel in Santa Monica, California, the Holiday Inn Express and the Sheraton Nashville Downtown Hotel, both in Nashville, Tennessee.

=== Commercial properties ===
The company's commercial properties consist of office complexes, storage facilities and industrial parks.

=== Residential properties ===
Through the company's multifamily division, JRK Residential Group, the company operates an additional 80 residential properties, consisting of 26,938 units in 28 different states.
