= Bridgestone Tower =

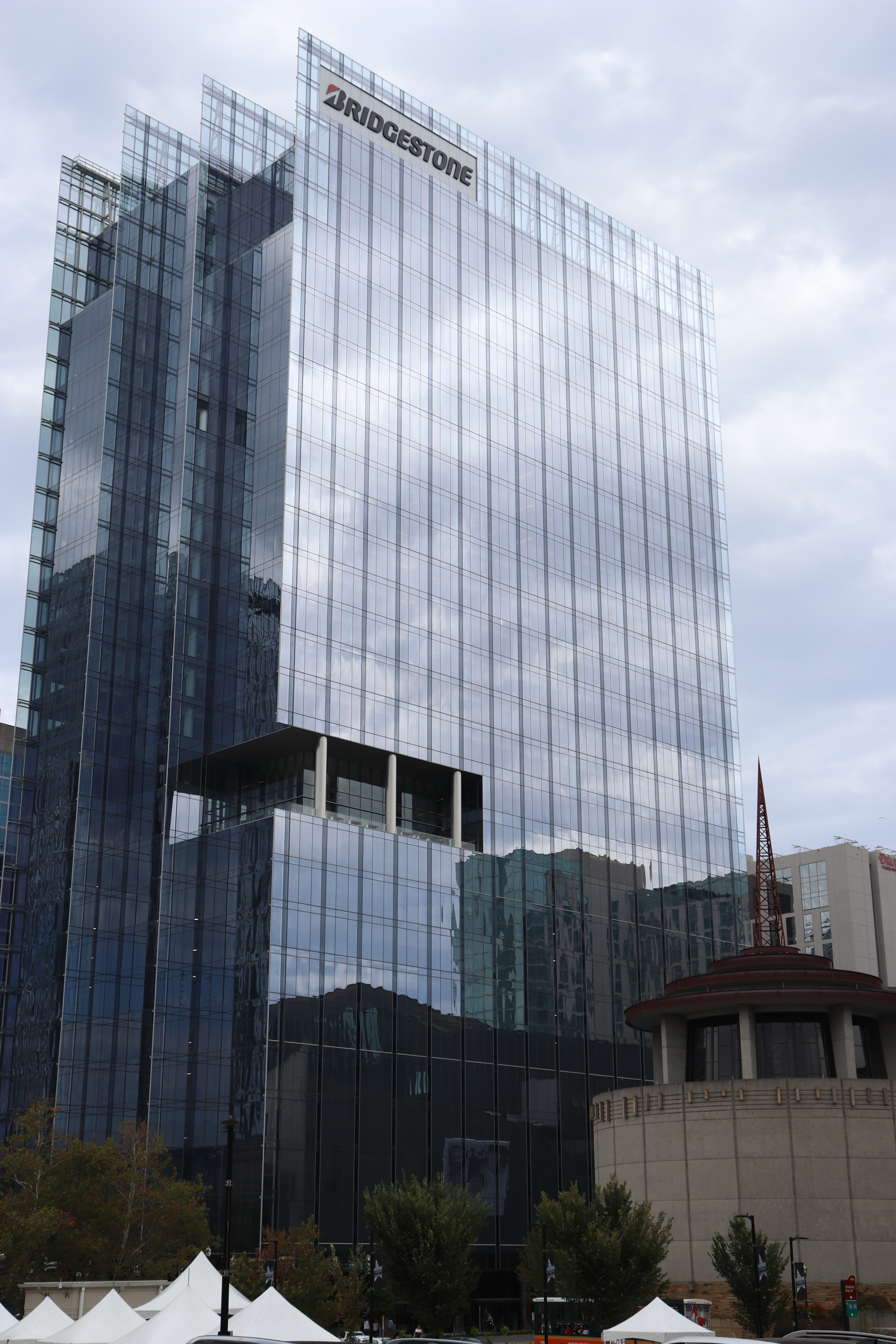
- Bridgestone Tower from Hilton Nashville Downtown
- Interactive map of the Bridgestone Tower area

General information
- Status: Completed
- Type: Office
- Location: 200 4th Avenue South; Nashville, Tennessee; United States
- Coordinates: 36°09′32″N 86°46′31″W
- Construction started: Early 2015
- Completed: 2017
- Cost: $200 million
- Owner: Highwoods Properties

Height
- Roof: 460 feet (140 m)

Technical details
- Floor count: 31
- Floor area: 514,000 sq ft (47,800 m^{2})

Design and construction
- Architect: Perkins+Will
- Developer: Highwoods Properties
- Main contractor: Brasfield & Gorrie

Bridgestone Tower is an American skyscraper in Nashville, Tennessee located at 200 4th Avenue South. It stands 460 feet (140 m) and has 31 floors. It was designed by Perkins&Will and was finished in 2017. The building serves as the headquarters of Bridgestone Americas, a subsidiary of Bridgestone, the global tire and rubber manufacturer. Throughout 2017, Bridgestone Americas consolidated many of their business units into a single building, housing nearly 2,000 employees. The tower is nestled between the Country Music Hall of Fame and the Schermerhorn Symphony Center, and is only a few hundred feet from Bridgestone's namesake NHL facility, Bridgestone Arena.

== History ==
Bridgestone Americas, then operating as Bridgestone-Firestone, moved its headquarters from Akron, Ohio to Nashville, Tennessee in 1992. In November 2014, Bridgestone announced a new downtown tower to be developed by Highwoods Properties. Construction began after the groundbreaking ceremony on January 7, 2015. The tower was completed and opened in December 2017. In 2018, Bridgestone Tower was awarded the LEED Gold Certification for its environmentally sustainable design.

== See also ==
- List of tallest buildings in Nashville
