= Fifth Third Center (Nashville) =

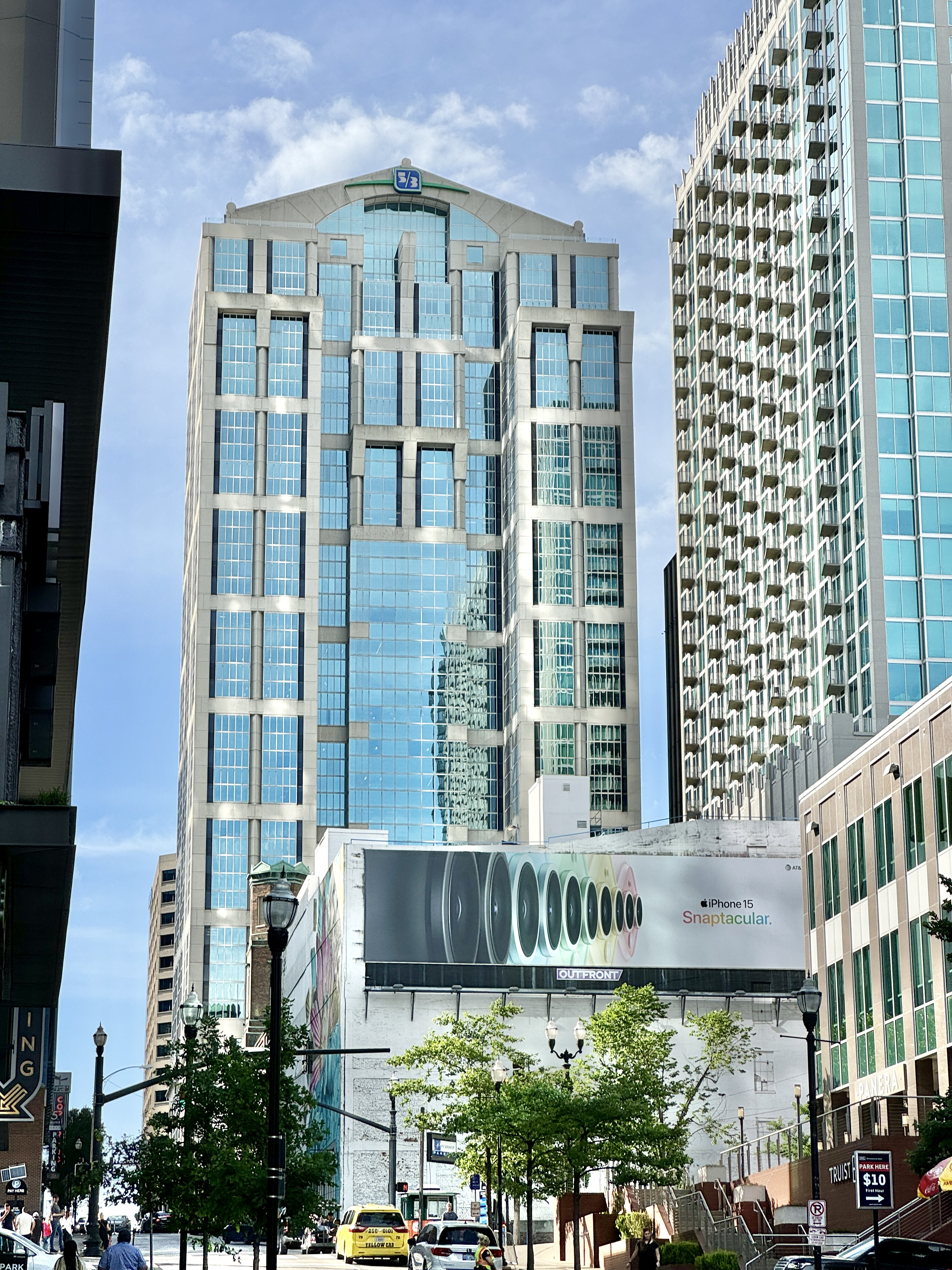
- Fifth Third Center

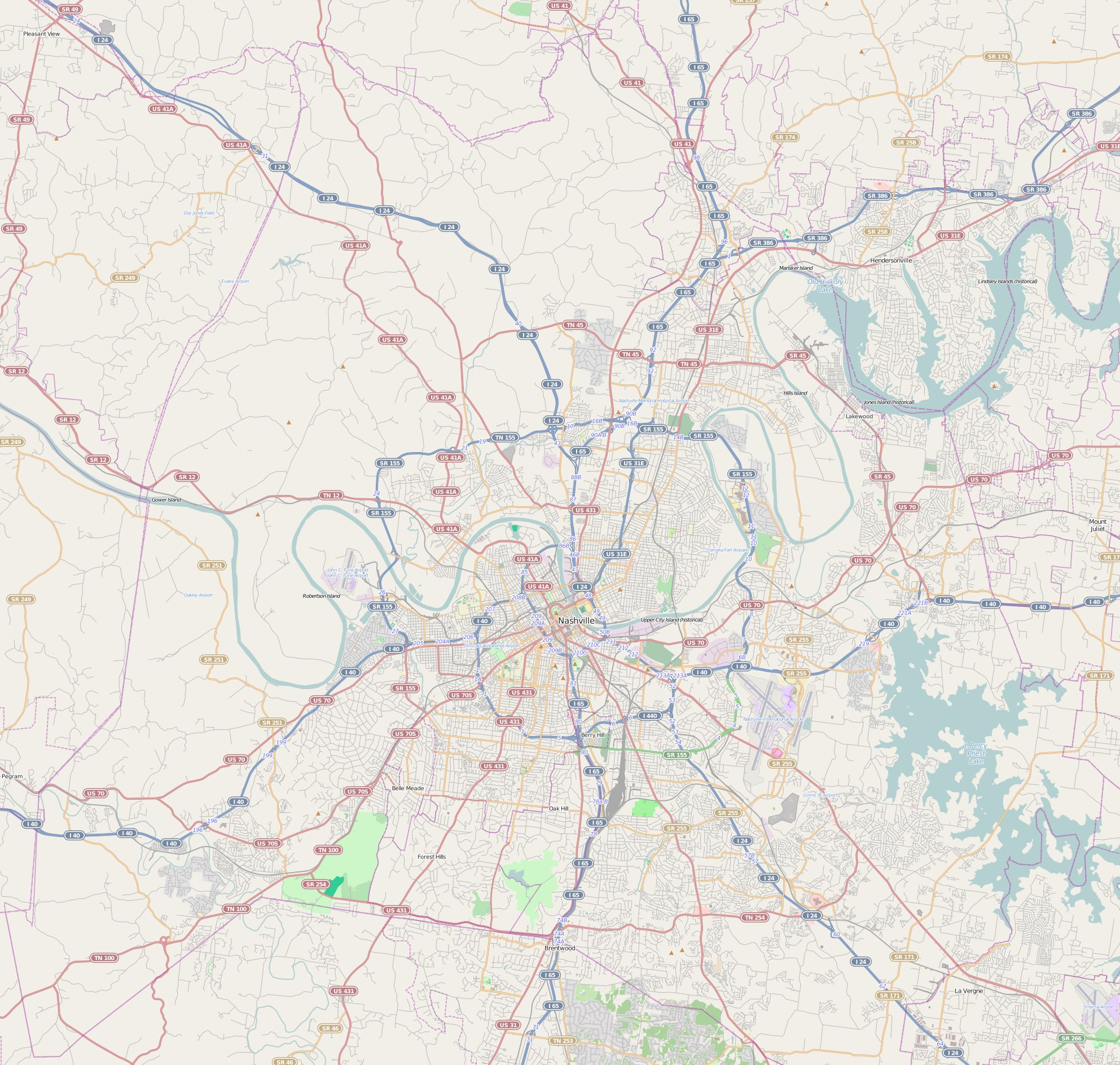
- Location within Nashville

General information
- Type: Office
- Architectural style: Postmodern
- Location: 424 Church Street; Nashville, Tennessee; United States
- Coordinates: 36.1637°N 86.7801°W
- Completed: 1986
- Owner: Amstar Group

Height
- Roof: 435 ft (133 m)

Technical details
- Floor count: 31
- Floor area: 488,853 sq ft (45,415.9 m^{2})
- Lifts/elevators: 13

Design and construction
- Architect: Kohn Pedersen Fox

The Fifth Third Center in Nashville, Tennessee, is a 31-story, 435-foot-tall (133 m) skyscraper. It was constructed in 1986 and is located on Church Street and Fifth Avenue North. It was the second tallest building in Nashville when it was completed. The Council on Vertical Urbanism lists the height of the building being 490 ft (150 m) tall, however it is debated whether the height counts the 50 ft deep underground parking garage. It serves as the home to Fifth Third Bank's Nashville headquarters.

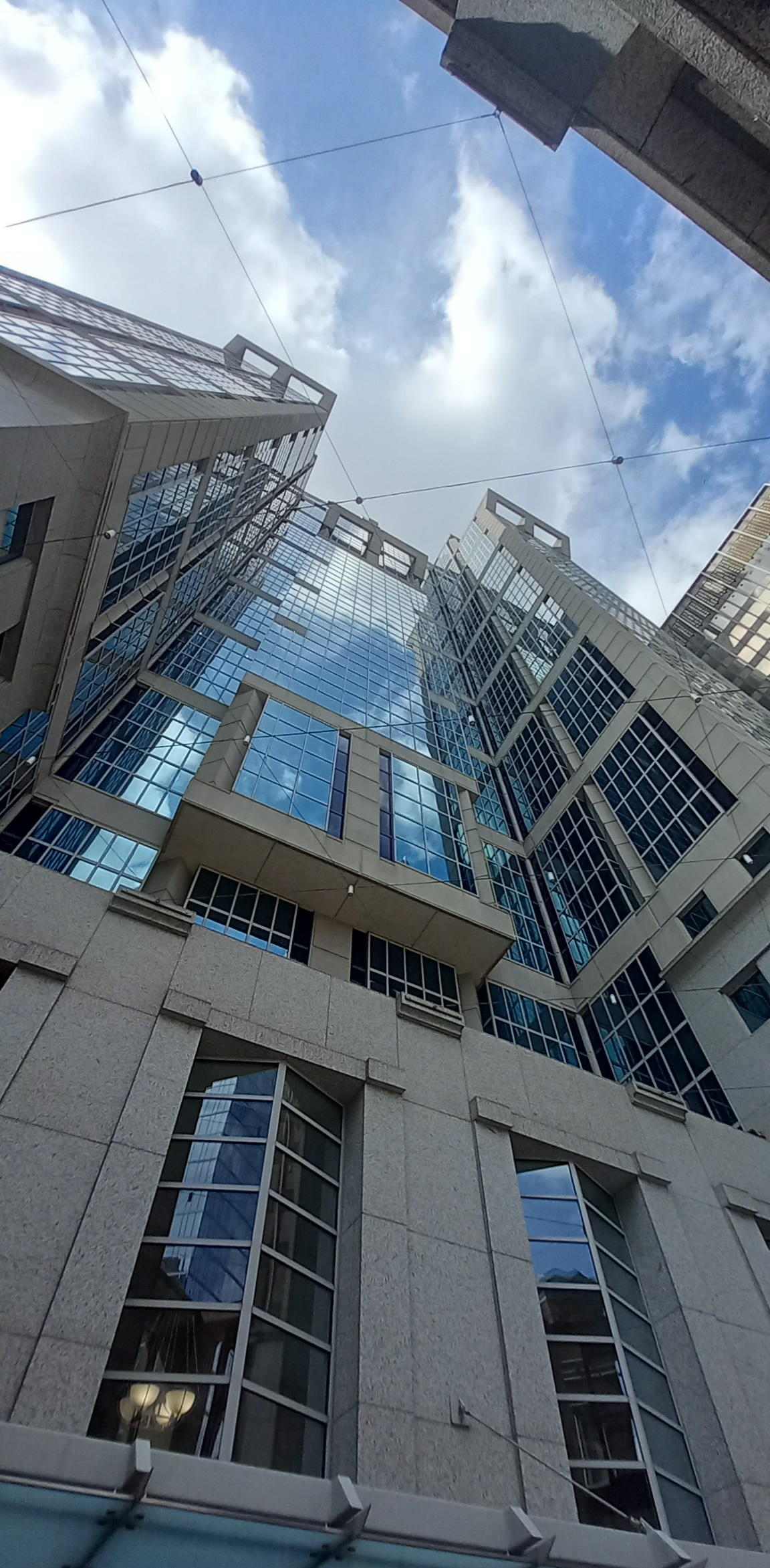

== History ==
The tower was designed as the Third National Corporation headquarters, and originally called Third National Financial Center. After the acquisition of Third National by SunTrust, the tower became known as SunTrust Center until 2004, when the naming rights were given up due to SunTrust's plans to move to the upcoming SunTrust Plaza.

This site was also home to the First Masonic Hall, designed in 1818. The structure burned in 1856 and was rebuilt as a Masonic Hall, which was used during the American Civil War as a hospital supply store by Federal troops. This new structure also included a theater known as "the Masonic" and "the Grand". The Masonic/Grand Theater was vacated for theatrical purposes in 1914, and the property was sold in 1915 to Joe Fensterwald, who demolished it and erected the steel and concrete building that was to house Burk and Company. In August 2025, the building went for sale and was eying a hotel conversion. During 2026, the building was announced to be anchored by Hilton and set to become a nearly 500-room hotel, making it the largest hotel transformation project in the entire state of Tennessee.

== See also ==
- List of tallest buildings in Nashville
