= Paramount Tower =

Future skyscraper in Nashville

- Former names: 1010 Church Street

General information
- Status: Under construction
- Type: Residential
- Location: 1010 Church Street; Nashville, Tennessee; United States
- Coordinates: 36°9′40″N 86°47′07″W
- Construction started: September 15, 2025
- Completed: Spring 2028

Height
- Height: 750 ft (229 m)

Technical details
- Floor count: 60
- Floor area: 700,000 sq ft (65,000 m^{2})

Design and construction
- Architecture firm: Goettsch Partners
- Developer: Giarratana Development, LLC

Other information
- Number of units: 500

Website
- https://www.paramountnashville.com/

Paramount Tower is a 750 feet (230 m), 60 story skyscraper under construction in Downtown Nashville, Tennessee, United States. Upon completion, it will be the tallest building in Nashville and the state of Tennessee. It was first announced on October 4, 2021 by long-time Nashville developer Giarratana Development. Construction began in 2025 and is expected to be completed in 2028. The building will contain 360 apartments and 140 condos for sale.

== History ==
=== Background ===
The concept of Paramount can be traced back to 2014, when Giarratana proposed Paramount to be the tallest building in the state on 505 Church, the site of the canceled Signature Tower. Giarratana has stated that Paramount was originally named after an old local theater. The building was planned with 60 stories. This was later downsized to 45, and the building was completed and renamed to 505 in 2018. After 505's completion, Giarratana proposed another skyscraper by the name of Paramount one block west of 505 that would once again be 750 feet tall, but would add 5 stories to bring the floor count to 65.

=== Revival ===
On October 4, 2021, Giarratana revealed his plans to construct Paramount (then known as 1010 Church as a placeholder) adjacent to his five-story YMCA Downtown expansion, as a 60-story residential tower with a different design and location than his original 2019 proposal. The proposal was submitted for the city to review in December of that year. Giarratana has stated that he originally wanted the tower to be 1000 feet tall (304 Meters), but ultimately that idea was scrapped in the early phases of planning.

== Design ==
Paramount will possess a zigzag exterior similar to nearby One22One that reflects sunlight in multiple directions. The exterior will gradually converge into a "crown" (as described by Goettsch) made of five isosceles triangles pointing down. The building's primary amenities are on the 9th floor, including a lounge, a fitness room, a game room, and a deck with an open-air pool to accommodate the residents' needs. Several of these can also be found on the 40th floor.

=== Construction ===
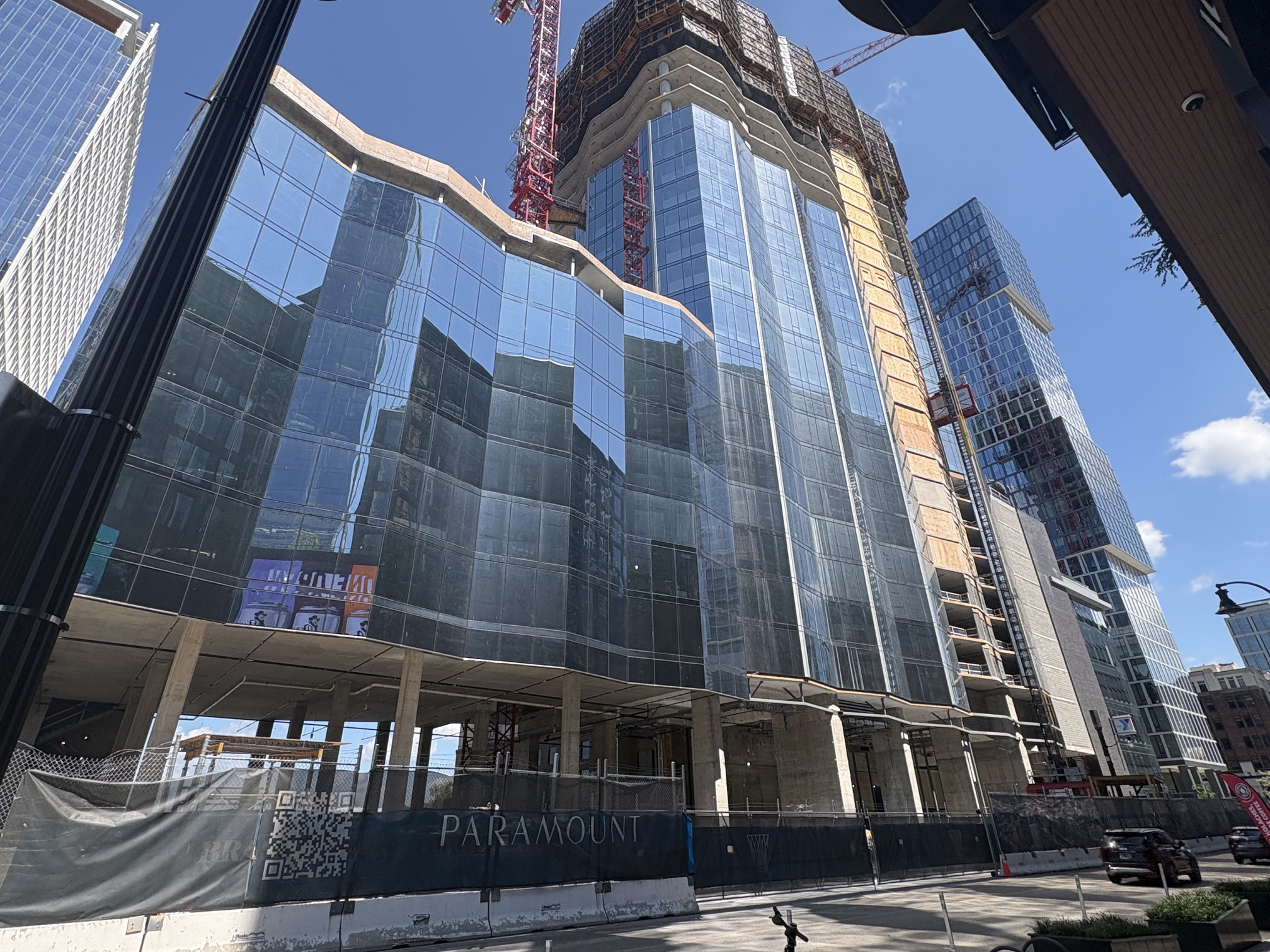
Paramount Tower during August 2026

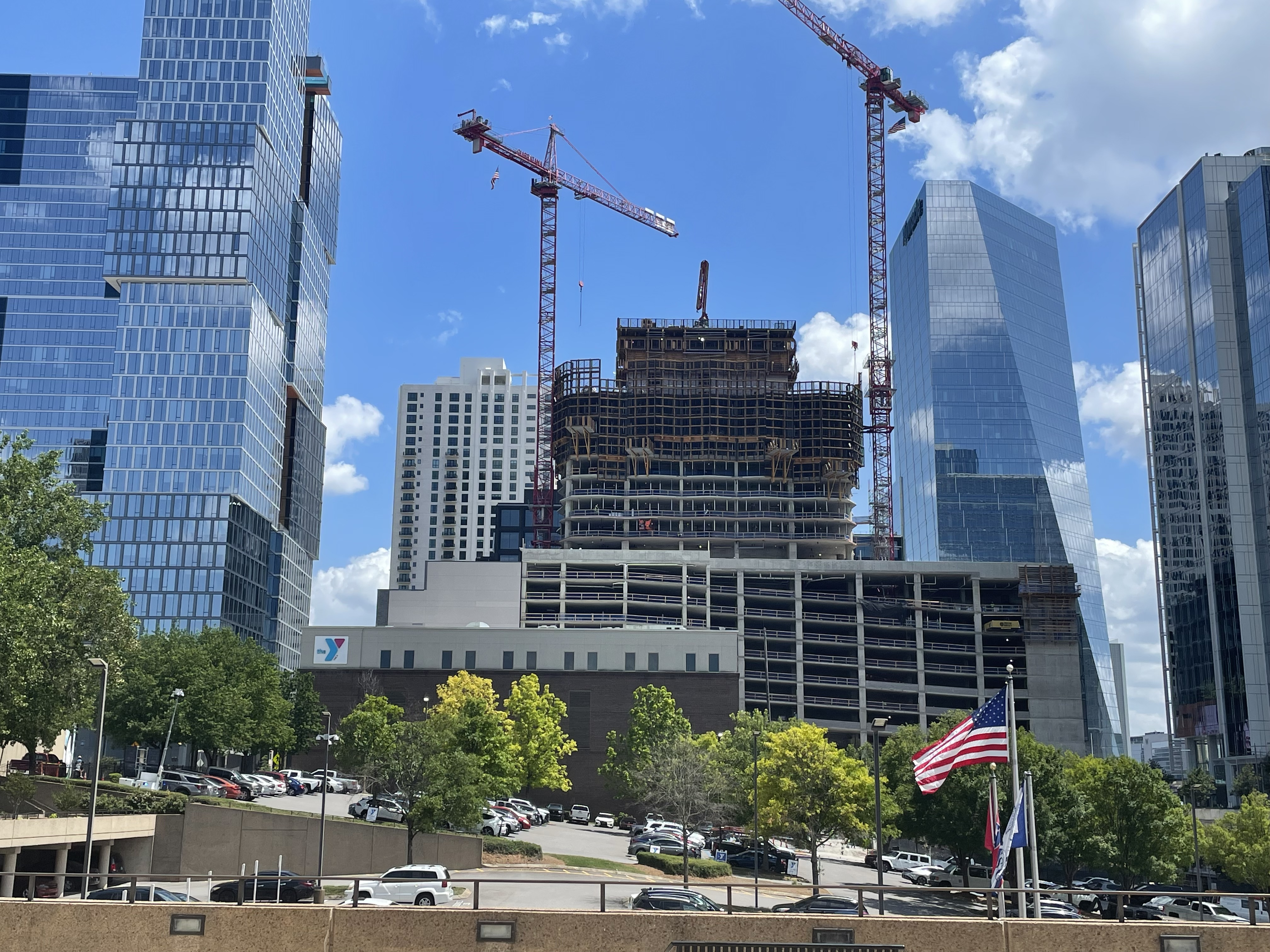
Paramount Tower from the backside, June 2026

Giarratana was approved for a $232 million loan to finance its construction in April 2024. However, he would terminate the loan a year later in 2025. In August, he would be approved for a new $340 million loan by New York City-based Franklin Templeton Investments. Construction began on September 15, 2025. Construction is currently well underway. The tower has started work on the apartments in the main structure. The building is currently expected to be completed by the spring of 2028, and is already a month ahead of schedule.

== See also ==
- List of tallest buildings in Nashville
- List of tallest buildings in Tennessee
