= List of tallest buildings in Tennessee =

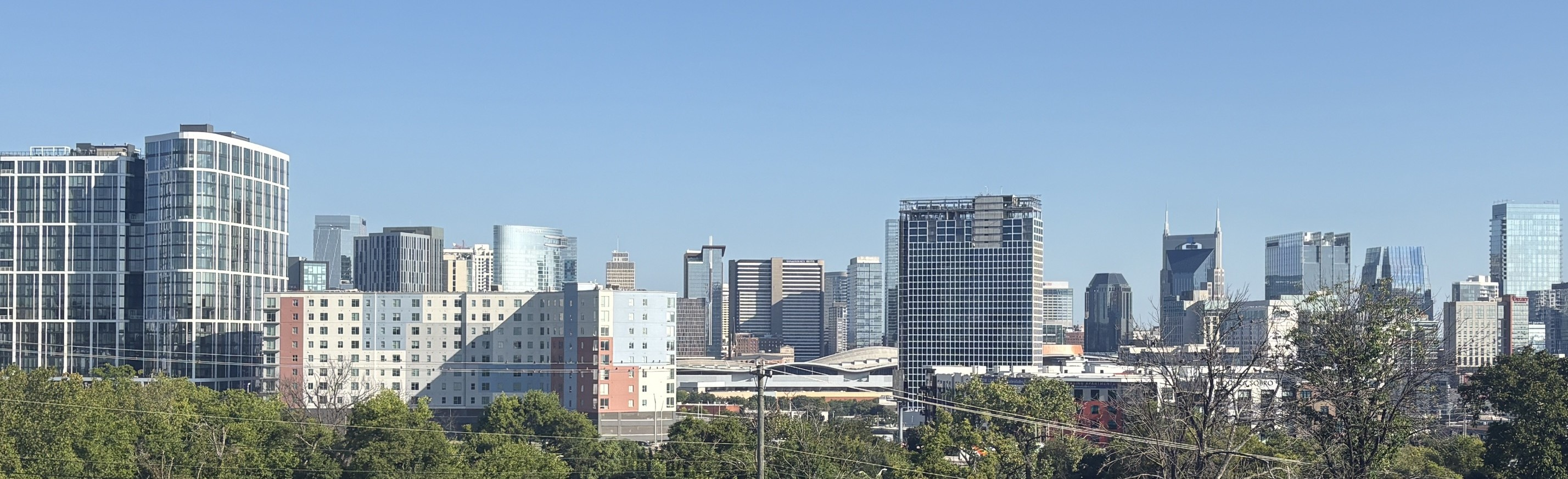
Nashville

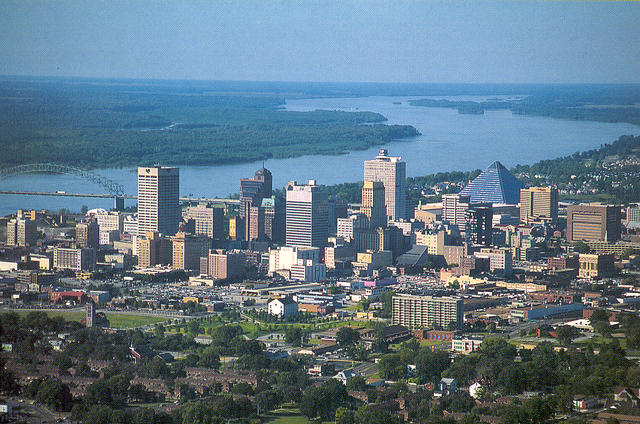
Memphis

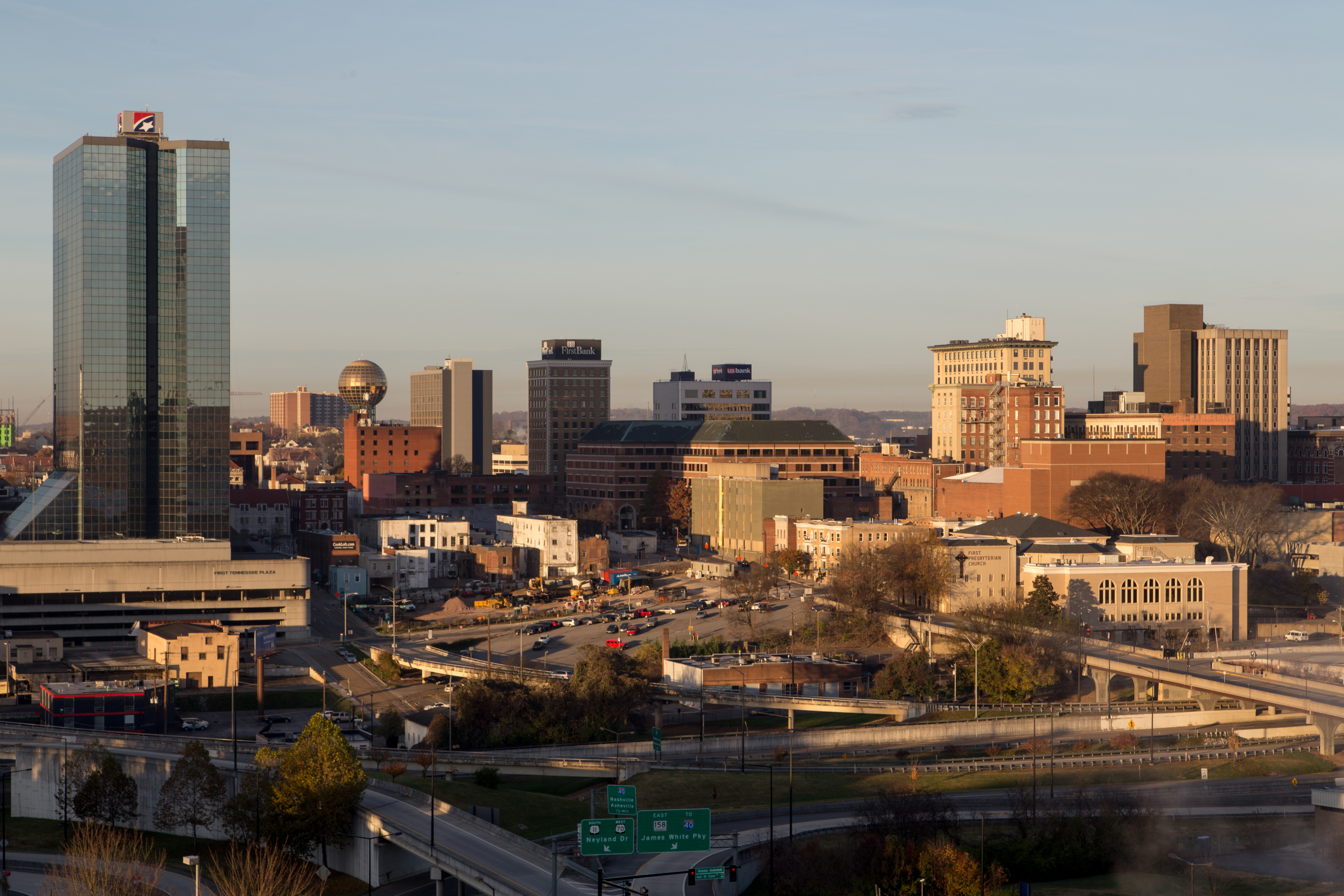
Knoxville

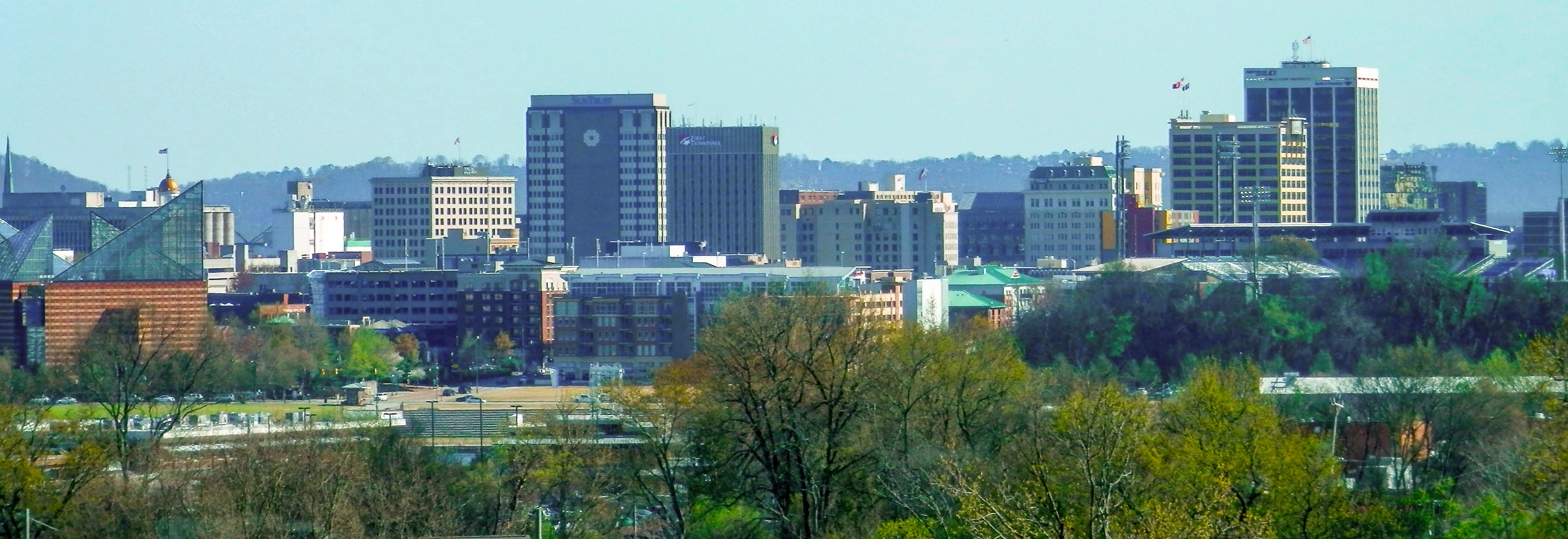
Chattanooga

This list of tallest buildings in Tennessee ranks skyscrapers in the U.S. state of Tennessee by height. Since 1970, all five tallest buildings statewide have been in Nashville. As of May 2026, 41 out of the 52 of the buildings on this list are in Nashville. The tallest by height is the AT&T Building, but the tallest by roof height is Four Seasons Hotel and Residences. However, Paramount Tower, under construction in Nashville, is set to surpass the AT&T Tower as the tallest building in Tennessee, with a height of 750 feet. Construction in Paramount is a month ahead of schedule and set for completion in early 2028, with topping out as soon as late 2027.

== Tallest buildings ==
This list ranks Tennessee skyscrapers that stand at least 300 feet tall, based on standard height measurement. This includes spires and architectural details but does not include antenna masts or other objects not part of the original plans. Existing structures are included for ranking purposes based on present height.

Was the tallest building in Nashville upon completion
Topped out but not yet completed

Rank	Name	Image	Height ft (m)	Floors	Year	City	Notes
1	333 Commerce		617 (188)	33	1994	Nashville	Tallest building in Tennessee. Previously named the South Central Bell Building, BellSouth Building, and AT&T Building.
2	Four Seasons Hotel and Residences		542 (165)	40	2021	Nashville	Tallest building in Tennessee by roof height. Tallest building completed in the 2020s so far.
3	505		522 (159)	45	2018	Nashville	First building in state history with forty or more floors. Tallest building in Tennessee by number of floors. Tallest building completed in the 2010s.
4	The Pinnacle at Nashville Yards	Pinnacle's_headquarters_at_Nashville_Yards,_taken_during_August_2026	504 (154)	35	2025	Nashville	Currently the tallest tower in the multi-tower Nashville Yards project.
5	Prime	Prime_Nashville_b	456 (139)	38	2024	Nashville	Prime is one of two Giarratana towers that are both residential and complimentary in styles.
6	William R. Snodgrass Tennessee Tower	Tennessee_Tower	452 (137.8)	31	1970	Nashville	Originally the National Life Center. Tallest building completed in Tennessee in the 1970s
7	Bridgestone Tower		444 (135.2)	30	2017	Nashville	Headquarters for Bridgestone in the United States
8	Fifth Third Center	Fifth Third Center Nashville TN	436 (133)	30	1986	Nashville	Originally known as the Third National Financial Center. Tallest building completed in Tennessee in the 1980s.
9	Amazon Tower Two	Amaz1	421 (128)	35	2023	Nashville	Second of two towers, in the Nashville Yards Development, for Amazon's Operations Center of Excellence.
10	The Emory	Emory	420 (128)	35	2025	Nashville	Built alongside The Everett as a two-tower project in the Nashville Yards neighborhood.
11	Alcove	Alcove_Nashville	418 (127)	34	2023	Nashville	First of three Giarratana-led residential towers surrounding the Nashville Yards development.
12	Pinnacle at Symphony Place		417 (127.1)	29	2010	Nashville	
13	The Place at Fifth + Broadway		415 (126.5)	34	2020	Nashville	Located at 5th and Broadway
14	100 North Main		430 (130)	37	1965	Memphis	Tallest building in Memphis since 1965. Tallest in Tennessee from 1965 to 1970. Listed on the National Register of Historic Places. Currently sits vacant, but major renovation underway. In 2017, new owner who will be gut-renovating and converting to apartments/possibly office use in 2019/2020.
15	The Everett	NY res ev2	409 (125)	34	2025	Nashville	Built alongside The Emory as a two-tower project in the Nashville Yards neighborhood.
16	Life and Casualty Tower		409 (125)	30	1957	Nashville	
17	Conrad Hotel and Residences		406 (124)	35	2021	Nashville	Topped out. This building will have a 14-story hotel in addition to 220 condominiums
18	Raymond James Tower		403 (123)	21	1985	Memphis	Includes the spire atop the building
19	Nashville City Center		402 (123)	27	1988	Nashville	
20	Clark Tower		400 (122)	34	1971	Memphis	Tallest building outside of downtown.
21	One Commerce Square		396 (121)	30	1972	Memphis	
22	James K. Polk State Office Building		392 (119)	24	1981	Nashville	
23	JW Marriott Nashville		386 (118)	33	2018	Nashville	
24	Renaissance Nashville Hotel		385 (117)	31	1987	Nashville	
25	Embassy Suites		384 (117)	30	2021	Nashville	Third hotel in a suite of hotels in this development: Embassy Suites, One Hotel and Cambria Hotel
26	Viridian Tower		378 (115)	31	2006	Nashville	
27	805 Lea		370 (110)	30	2021	Nashville	Located in Nashville's SoBro District, the building will have a total of 354 residential units.
28	Sterick Building		365 (111)	29	1930	Memphis	
29	One Nashville Place		359 (109)	23	1985	Nashville	
30-T	One22One	One22One_during_August_2026	360 (109.7)	28	2022	Nashville	
30-T	Ray Nashville		360 (109.7)	32	2027	Nashville	Located at 601 Lafayette St. in downtown's Pie Town, this skyscraper will offer 411 residential units, 373 parking spaces, and 6,000 square feet of retail. Topped out and nearing full skinning, with interior work underway as of May 2026.
32	UBS Tower		354 (108)	28	1973	Nashville	
33	The Olive at Peabody Union		350 (107)	27	2025	Nashville	Located at 30 Peabody Street, the tower is adjacent to a six-story office building owned by Eakin partners completed in 2019.
34	Albion Music Row		350 (106.7)	34	2026	Nashville	Fully skinned as of April 2026 and will accept first residents by spring's end, according to local media reports. Located at 14th and McGavock in Midtown, this will be the taller of two residential towers planned for the site and will offer 458 units.
35	The SoBro		345 (105)	33	2016	Nashville	
36-T	1200 Broadway		344 (105)	27	2019	Nashville	Also known as Endeavor Tower
36-T	Amazon Tower 1		344 (105)	21	2020	Nashville	Located at 1010 Church Street, in the Nashville Yards Development, this is the first of two towers being developed for Amazon's Operations Center of Excellence.
38	Westin Hotel		337 (103)	27	2016	Nashville	
39	First Horizon Bank Tower		332 (101)	25	1964	Memphis	
40	501 Commerce		331 (101)	26	2020	Nashville	
41	Hilton Memphis		329 (100)	27	1975	Memphis	
42	Plaza Tower		327 (100)	27	1979	Knoxville	Tallest building outside of Nashville and Memphis
43-T	222 2nd Avenue South		326 (99)	26	2017	Nashville	
43-T	Broadwest Office Tower		326 (99)	21	2021	Nashville	Located in Midtown Nashville
45	Modera McGavock		325 (99)	29	2025	Nashville	Features 396 units with 12,000 square feet of retail.
46	Memphis Pyramid		321 (98)	5	1991	Memphis	7th-tallest pyramid and largest Bass Pro Shops in the world. Home to retail, restaurants, an observation deck, a hotel, a bowling alley, and the largest free-standing elevator in America.
47	Grand Hyatt		320 (98)	25	2020	Nashville	This Grand Hyatt 27-floor tower opened in 2020 in downtown Nashville.
48	Riverview Tower		312 (95)	24	1985	Knoxville	
49	West End Tower		306 (93)	21	2021	Nashville	Located on the edge of the Vanderbilt University campus and West End Avenue, this tower houses student apartments.
50-T	Sheraton Nashville Downtown		300 (91)	27	1975	Nashville	
50-T	Republic Centre		300 (91)	21	1975	Chattanooga	Tallest building in Chattanooga.
50-T	The Motley Tower One		300 (91)	26	2027	Nashville	Located at 1401 Church St, this is the first of a planned three-tower residential complex collectively called The Motley. Tower one topped out and will offer 326 units and 1,400 square feet of retail space.

== Tallest under construction ==
The following table ranks buildings under construction in Nashville that are expected to be at least 300 ft (91 m) tall when topped out or completed.

Name	Photo	Height ft (m)	Floors	Year	Purpose	City	Notes
Paramount Tower		750 (230)	60	2028	Residential	Nashville	Will be, once completed, Tennessee's tallest building. Located at 1010 Church St., the Nashville-based Giarratana Development is developing the with 500 residential units.
Pendry Hotel and Residences		388 (118)	30	2027	Mixed-use	Nashville	Mixed-use residential and hotel building. Full scale work started in July 2025.
Nashville EDITION Hotel & Residences		355 (108)	28	2027	Mixed-use	Nashville	Will include both hotel and condominiums. Full scale underway as of 2026.
Voce		303 (92)	25	2027	Mixed-use	Nashville	To be located at 1717 Hayes in Midtown and will include 194 condo units and 60,000 sq. ft. of office. Preliminary site work was undertaken in late 2024 and $130 million construction loan has been secured. Construction started in December 2025. Structure is fully above grade as of mid-2026.

== Tallest pending construction ==
These buildings have either been issued permits and approved that stand 280 feet (85 m) using standard measurement.

Name	Height feet	Height meters	Floors	Year	City	Notes
800 Lea	610	190	45		Nashville	Located at 800 Lea st. The developer will be Giarratana. The design will be a curved tower. They say it could be 18 months for permits to be approved and the construction will take 3.5 years to take on. A permit has been issued to allow grading work to start
Ritz-Carlton Tower	569	173	46		Nashville	Located on the former KVB tower property it will be accompanied by a 32-story Tower with planned early 2022 start
Circle South Office Tower	443	135	30	2023	Nashville	Located at 410 8th avenue south. The design will be a leaning tower. The current buildings on the property will be razed and demolished.
531 Second Ave. Tower 1	433	132	36	2024	Nashville	531 Second ave. The Boston developer who is developing the 40 story Four Seasons hotel. The developer has downgraded to 38 stories now 36 stories and has added a 18-story building to the proposal.
Ritz-Carlton Residential Tower	396	121	32	2025	Nashville	Located at 417 Seventh Ave S. A two tower project would take the place of One KVB tower which fell through. Eyeing an early 2022 groundbreaking.
531 Second Ave. Tower 2	375	114	32	2023	Nashville	located at 531 Second ave.
Gulch union Tower 3	362	110	28	2024	Nashville	Located at 1207 McGavock st.
1601 Broadway	326	99	27	2022	Nashville	This Midtown mixed use tower is by the New York firm Scenic Investments. Eyeing a summer 2021 start, no on site action but a fence is around the property. The property is located at the west end Ave and the Broadway split. The development of Broadwest, Alcove and Regent Apartments is in the area and the development of a future high rise is in the books at the locally famous Nashville sign.
18 Main LLC Pinch District Office	325	99	22	2023	Memphis	Proposed tower adjacent to downtown in the Pinch. Will be one of 5 or 6 towers.
18 Main LLC Mixed use Tower: Residential or office or hotel, TBD.	325	99	24	2023	Memphis	5th highrise in Pinch Development.
Avalon	323	98	25	2022	Nashville	Located at 1719 Hayes st. Was planned as a 30-story building but it underwent a design change making the building smaller. Eyeing a 2021 Summer start
18 Main LLC Pinch District Hotel	300	91	20	2024	Memphis	Major high rise brand hotel.
North Main Hotel Loews Brand Convention Center Hotel	300	91	26	2024	Memphis	Loews Hotel next to convention center.
18 Main LLC Pinch District Residential	300	91	22	2023	Memphis	Second high rise residential tower in the Pinch District.

== Timeline of tallest buildings ==
This lists buildings that once held the title of tallest building in Tennessee.

Name	City	Street Address	Years as tallest	Height feet	Height meters	Floors
Number 10 Main	Memphis	10 South Main Street	1904–1905	216	66	16
Madison Hotel	Memphis	79 Madison Avenue	1905–1910	232	71	16
Exchange Building	Memphis	9 North Second Street	1910–1924	264	80	19
Lincoln American Tower	Memphis	60 North Main Street	1924–1930	290	88	22
Sterick Building	Memphis	8 North Third Street	1930–1965	365	111	29
Life & Casualty Tower	Nashville	100 North Main Street	1957–1965	409	125	31
100 North Main	Memphis	100 North Main Street	1965–1970	430	130	37
William R. Snodgrass Tennessee Tower	Nashville	312 Rosa L. Parks Avenue	1970–1994	452	138	32
AT&T Building	Nashville	333 Commerce Street	1994–present	632	193	33

== See also ==
- List of tallest buildings in Chattanooga
- List of tallest buildings in Knoxville
- List of tallest buildings in Memphis
- List of tallest buildings in Nashville
