= List of tallest buildings in Memphis =

Skyline of Memphis
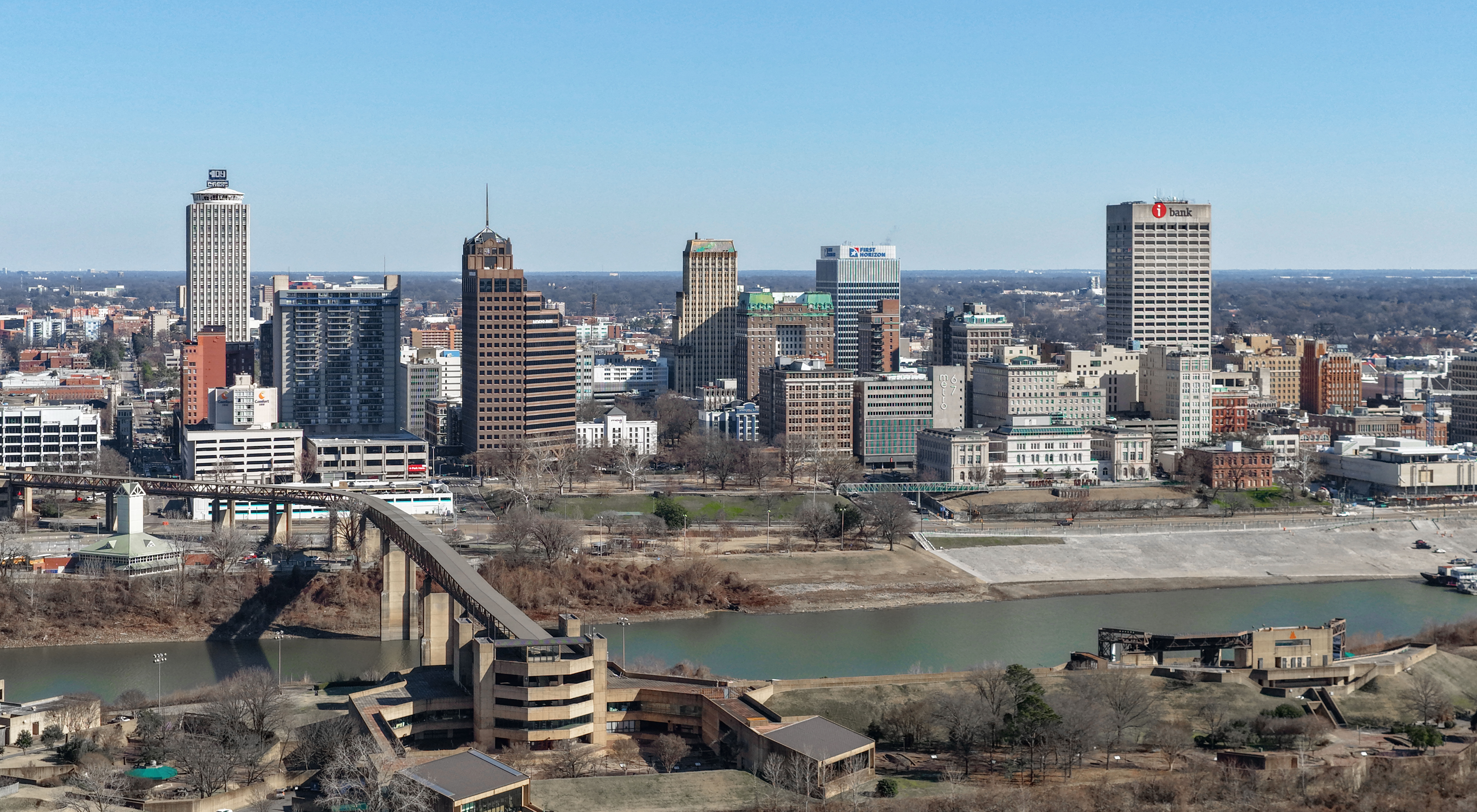
- Downtown Memphis in 2026
- Tallest building: 100 North Main (1965)
- Tallest building height: 430 ft (131.1 m)

Number of tall buildings (2026)
- Taller than 100 m (328 ft): 7

Number of tall buildings — feet
- Taller than 200 ft (61.0 m): 22 + 2 T/O (Note: Topped-out.)
- Taller than 300 ft (91.4 m): 8

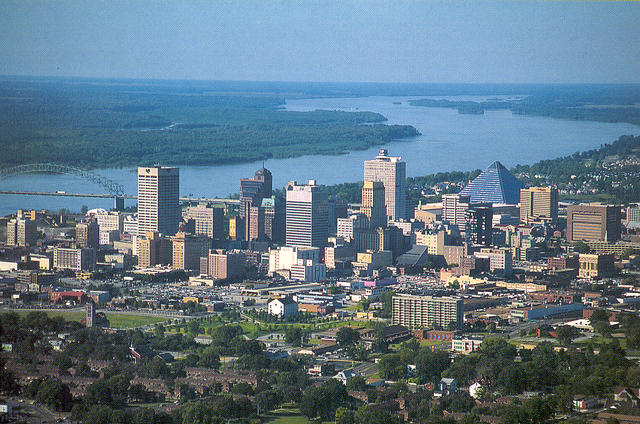
Aerial view of Memphis in 2005

Memphis is the second largest city in the U.S. state of Tennessee, with a metropolitan area of 1.34 million residents. The city is the site of over 80 high-rise structures. 24 buildings stand taller than 200 feet (61 m) as of 2026, eight of which have a height greater than 300 feet (91 m). Memphis has the second largest skyline in Tennessee after Nashville. The tallest building in Memphis is 100 North Main, a 430 ft (131 m), 37-story office building constructed in 1965. 100 North Main has sat vacant since 2014, with plans underway to redevelop it into a mixed-use building.

The city's first skyscraper is considered to be the D.T. Porter Building, which was built in 1895 at a height of 10 stories. Early high-rises include the Memphis Trust Building, the Madison Hotel, and the Exchange Building, each of which became the tallest building in Memphis and in Tennessee. The 1920s saw the construction of the Gothic Revival style Lincoln American Tower in 1924. With a height of 288 ft (88 m), it was the tallest building in the state before being surpassed by the 365 ft (111 m) Sterick Building in 1930. The Sterick Building was the tallest building in the Southern United States until 1932, when it was surpassed by the Louisiana State Capitol in Baton Rouge.

Following the onset of the Great Depression, little high-rise development occurred from the 1930s to 1950s. This pause was broken by the First Horizon Bank Tower in 1964. A year later, 100 North Main was completed. It would be the last building in Memphis to be the tallest in Tennessee, as the Tennessee Tower in Nashville took the title in 1970. Clark Tower, the city's third tallest building, was completed in 1972 in East Memphis. The Raymond James Tower, Memphis' second tallest building, was completed in 1985. The iconic Memphis Pyramid, reflecting the city's namesake in Egypt, opened in 1991. At 321 ft (98 m), it is the eighth-tallest building in Memphis. Unlike many other downtowns in the Sun Belt, Memphis did not experience the high-rise building booms of the late 1980s or 2000s, resulting in a smaller, more historic skyline compared to other cities of a similar size.

Most high-rises in the city are located in Downtown Memphis, which is eastof the Mississippi River. However, three of the city's tallest buildings are in the neighborhood of East Memphis: Clark Tower, Hilton Memphis, and the White Station Tower. The St. Jude Children's Research Hospital is adding several clinical high-rise buildings north of downtown, with two topped out as of 2026. The One Beale project, first proposed in the 2000s, planned to add several towers to the downtown riverfront.

== History ==
Number of buildings by height in Memphis by the end of each year, based on the information in this article. This takes into account two demolished buildings. Click on the legend to toggle a specific height on or off. View chart definition.

== Map of tallest buildings ==
The map below shows the location of buildings taller than 200 ft (61 m) in Memphis, over half of which are located in downtown. Each marker is numbered by the building's height rank, and colored by the decade of its completion.

Buildings taller than 200 ft (61 m) in Memphis. An asterisk (*) next to the building's name indicates it is located outside the map.
- 1950s and before
- 1960s
- 1970s
- 1980s
- 1990s
- 2000s
- 2010s
- 2020s
1 100 North Main
2 Raymond James Tower
3 Clark Tower*
4 One Commerce Square
5 Sterick Building
6 First Horizon Bank Tower
7 Hilton Memphis*
8 Memphis Pyramid
9 Indigo Riverview
10 Lincoln American Tower
11 White Station Tower*
12 St. Jude Children's Research Hospital Outpatient Clinic Building
13 St. Jude Children's Research Hospital Clinical Office Building
14 Le Bonheur Children's Hospital
15 Exchange Building
16 One Memphis Place
17 Madison Hotel
18 Memphis Trust Building
19 Memphis Riverline Hotel
20 The Goodwyn
21 Claridge House
22 Mid-Memphis Tower*
23 The Tower at Peabody Place
24 The Artesian*

== Cityscape ==
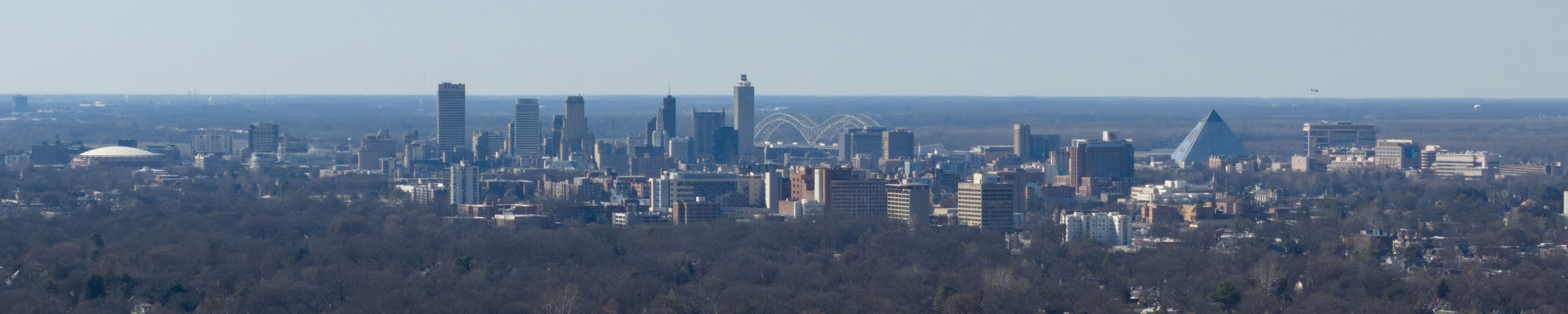
Memphis in 2026, looking west

== Tallest buildings ==
This list ranks completed buildings in Memphis that stand at least 200 ft (61 m) tall as of 2026, based on standard height measurement. This includes spires and architectural details but does not include antenna masts. The “Year” column indicates the year of completion. Buildings tied in height are sorted by year of completion with earlier buildings ranked first, and then alphabetically.

Was the tallest building in Memphis upon completion
Indicates buildings still under construction that have been architecturally topped out

Rank	Name	Image	Location	Height ft (m)	Floors	Year	Purpose	Notes
1	100 North Main		35°08′52″N 90°03′03″W	430 (131.1)	37	1965	Office	Tallest building in Memphis since 1965. Tallest building in Tennessee from 1965 to 1970. Tallest building completed in Memphis in the 1960s. Listed on the National Register of Historic Places. The building has sat vacant since 2014, and renovation is underway to convert it into a mixed-use office, residential, and hotel building. The first phase is set to be completed in 2026.
2	Raymond James Tower		35°08′50″N 90°03′11″W	403 (122.9)	21	1985	Office	Tallest building completed in Memphis in the 1980s. The height figure includes the 61 ft (18.6 m) spire. Formerly known as the Morgan Keegan Tower.
3	Clark Tower		35°06′44″N 89°53′30″W	400 (121.9)	34	1971	Office	Tallest building completed in Memphis in the 1970s. Tallest building in Memphis outside of downtown.
4	One Commerce Square		35°08′38″N 90°03′10″W	396 (120.7)	31	1973	Office	
5	Sterick Building		35°08′41″N 90°03′00″W	365 (111.3)	29	1930	Office	Tallest building in Tennessee and the Southern United States from 1930 to 1957. Tallest building in Memphis from 1930 to 1965. Tallest building completed in Memphis in the 1930s. Listed on the National Register of Historic Places.
6	First Horizon Bank Tower		35°08′39″N 90°03′03″W	332 (101.2)	25	1964	Office	Formerly known as the First National Bank Building and the First Tennessee Bank Building.
7	Hilton Memphis		35°06′19″N 89°52′06″W	329 (100.3)	27	1975	Hotel	Tallest hotel building in Memphis.
8	Memphis Pyramid		35°09′21″N 90°03′07″W	321 (97.8)	3	1991	Mixed-use	Tenth-tallest pyramid and largest Bass Pro Shops in the world. Home to retail, restaurants, an observation deck, a hotel, a bowling alley, and the largest free-standing elevator in America. Tallest building completed in Memphis in the 1990s.
9	Indigo Riverview		35°08′52″N 90°03′09″W	296 (90.2)	25	1968	Residential	Tallest residential building in Memphis. Also known as 99 Tower Place.
10	Lincoln American Tower		35°08′48″N 90°03′07″W	288 (87.8)	22	1924	Residential	Tallest building in Memphis from 1924 to 1930. Listed on the National Register of Historic Places. Tallest building completed in Memphis in the 1920s.
11	White Station Tower		35°06′47″N 89°53′35″W	280 (85.4)	22	1965	Office	When constructed, the top of the building was utilized as a revolving restaurant. The Memphis-based Independent Bank (or i-Bank) is headquartered in the building and its logo is illuminated on the top of the building.
12	St. Jude Children's Research Hospital Outpatient Clinic Building		35°09′16″N 90°02′39″W	265 (80.8)	15	2026	Health	Tallest building completed in Memphis in the 2020s.
13	St. Jude Children's Research Hospital Clinical Office Building		35°09′17″N 90°02′42″W	256 (78.0)	15	2026	Office	
14	Le Bonheur Children's Hospital		35°08′42″N 90°01′54″W	251 (76.5)	12	2010	Health	
15	Exchange Building		35°08′43″N 90°03′06″W	248 (75.6)	19	1910	Residential	Tallest building in Memphis from 1910 to 1924. Listed on the National Register of Historic Places. Tallest building completed in Memphis in the 1910s.
16	One Memphis Place		35°08′48″N 90°02′57″W	221 (67.4)	15	1985	Office	
17	Madison Hotel		35°08′43″N 90°03′12″W	219 (66.8)	16	1907	Hotel	Tallest building in Memphis from 1907 to 1910. Listed on the National Register of Historic Places. Tallest building completed in Memphis in the 1900s.
18	Memphis Trust Building		35°08′41″N 90°03′09″W	212 (64.6)	16	1904	Residential	Tallest building in Memphis from 1904 to 1907. Listed on the National Register of Historic Places. Also known as 10 Main Apartments.
19	Memphis Riverline Hotel		35°09′06″N 90°02′59″W	210 (64) (Note: Sources do not state the exact height of this building. This figure was determined using Google Earth by subtracting the altitude of the building's lowest main pedestrian open-air entrance from its highest architectural point.)	19	1985	Hotel	Formerly known as the Crowne Plaza Hotel, Marriott Memphis Downtown, and Sheraton Memphis Downtown.
20	The Goodwyn		35°08′41″N 90°03′07″W	207 (63.1)	18	1909	Residential	Originally an office building serving as home to First Tennessee Bank and later Central Bank and Trust Co. Converted into condominiums in 2006.
21	Claridge House	—	35°08′53″N 90°03′07″W	206 (63)	15	1924	Residential	
22	Mid-Memphis Tower	—	35°08′11″N 90°00′54″W	203 (61.9)	16	1976	Office	
23	The Tower at Peabody Place		35°08′29″N 90°03′15″W	202 (61.6)	15	1997	Office	
24	The Artesian		35°07′42″N 90°04′05″W	201 (61.3)	16	2015	Residential	

== Tallest under construction or proposed ==
=== Under construction ===
The following table includes buildings under construction in Memphis that are planned to be at least 200 ft (61 m) tall as of 2026, based on standard height measurement. The “Year” column indicates the expected year of completion. Buildings that are on hold are not included.

Name	Height ft (m)	Floors	Year	Purpose	Notes
St. Jude Children's Research Hospital Advanced Research Center II	280 (85.3)	16	2028	Health	

=== Proposed ===
The following table includes approved and proposed buildings in Memphis that are expected to be at least 200 ft (61 m) tall as of 2026, based on standard height measurement. The “Year” column indicates the expected year of completion. A dash “–“ indicates information about the building’s height, floor count, or year of completion is unknown or has not been released.

Name	Height ft (m)	Floors	Year	Purpose	Notes
One Beale - Residential Tower	460 (140)	30	–	Residential	

== Tallest demolished ==
There have been two buildings that once stood taller than 200 ft (61 m) in Memphis and has since been demolished.

Name	Image	Height ft (m)	Floors	Year completed	Year demolished	Purpose	Notes
Baptist Memorial Hospital		255 (77.7)	21	1967	2005	Health	The 21-story main tower of Baptist Memorial Hospital was demolished via controlled implosion in 2005.
Medical Center Towers	—	253 (77)	20	1968	2026	Hotel	Formerly a Holiday Inn hotel. University of Tennessee Health Science Center bought the building in 2015.

== Timeline of tallest buildings ==
This lists buildings that once held the title of tallest building in Memphis.

Name	Image	Street Address	Years as tallest	Height ft (m)	Floors
Memphis Trust Building		10 South Main Street	1904–1905	212 (64.6)	16
Madison Hotel		79 Madison Avenue	1905–1910	219 (66.8)	16
Exchange Building		9 North Second Street	1910–1924	248 (75.6)	19
Lincoln American Tower		60 North Main Street	1924–1930	288 (87.8)	22
Sterick Building		8 North Third Street	1930–1965	365 (111.3)	29
100 North Main		100 North Main Street	1965–present	430 (131.1)	37
