= Robert Lee Hall =

American architect

Robert Lee Hall (July 19, 1922 – January 24, 1990) was an architect based in Memphis, Tennessee who established the firm of Robert Lee Hall and Associates. He designed Clark Tower in East Memphis, 100 North Main in downtown Memphis, and Patterson Hall at the University of Memphis.

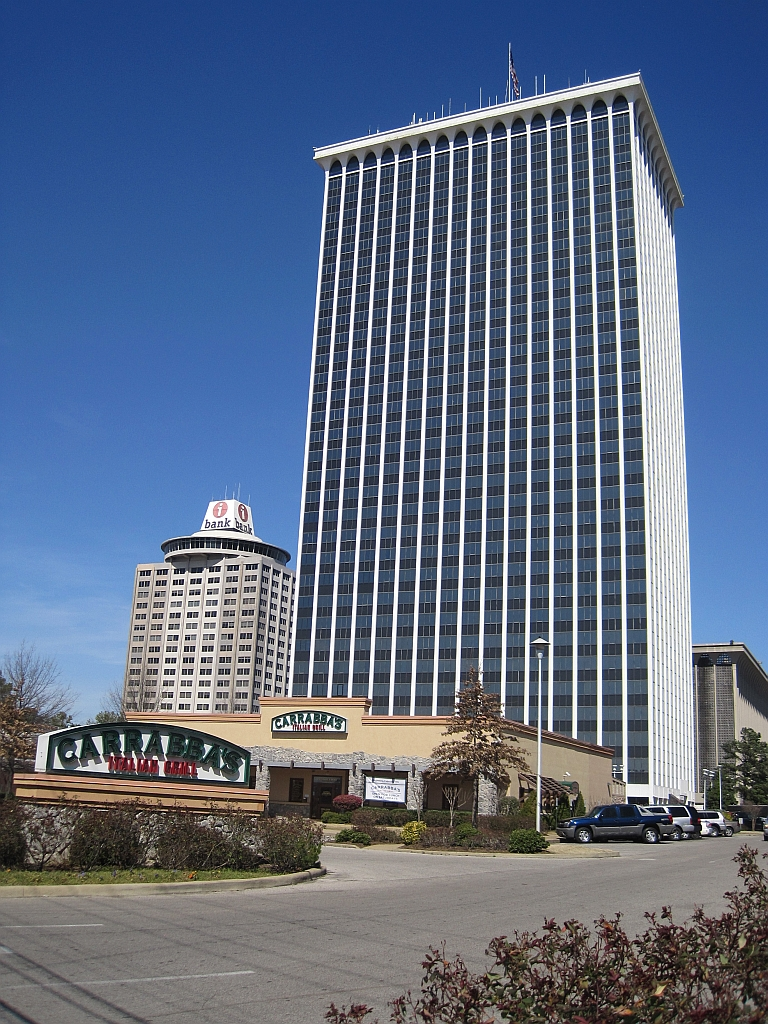
White Station Tower (left) and Clark Tower in Memphis, both designed by Hall

Hall was born in Jackson, Tennessee. He worked at Fisher Body aircraft plant in Memphis where he met Annie Laurie McGee, a Memphis socialite, whom he married in 1943. He served in the Army Air Corps during World War II.

His firm eventually became a partnership with his former associate Ben Waller as Hall & Waller Architects.

Hall was an alderman in Germantown, Tennessee and served on the city planning board. He was also a Shriner and belonged to the Kiwanis Club. He had four children. He was also a boyscout leader.

He was president of the American Institute of Architects Memphis branch in 1972.

He is buried at Memorial Park Cemetery in Memphis.

Hall graduated from the Memphis Academy of Arts (Memphis College of Art).

He was given an honorary architecture degree from the University of Tennessee. He was a trustee at the Germantown United Methodist Church.

== Work ==
- Clark Tower (1970 - 1971) in East Memphis. Renovated in 2004.
- Patterson Hall at the University of Memphis
- Clark Oil building on 6th Street in Milwaukee
- Old Holiday Inn in Rivermont
- Building similar to 100 North Main, but without the revolving restaurant, in Milwaukee, Wisconsin
- 100 North Main (1965) in downtown Memphis, the city's tallest building.
- Parkway Towers (1968) in Nashville, Tennessee
- International Trade Mart (World Trade Center New Orleans) building (now the Four Seasons Hotel and Private Residences New Orleans) (1967) in New Orleans, Louisiana, associate architect with Edward Durell Stone NRHP listed
- The Troubadour (1967) in New Orleans, Louisiana
- iBank Tower, also known as White Station Tower, (1965) at 5050 Poplar Avenue in Memphis, Tennessee
- 136 East South Temple (1965) in Salt Lake City, Utah
- University Club Building in Salt Lake City with ashley Carpenter
- Anthony Wayne Bank Building (1964) in Fort Wayne, Indiana Converted into the Anthony Wayne Building, a condo tower, in 2011.
- River Tower at South Bluffs (1964) in Memphis, Tennessee
- 633 Building (1962) in Milwaukee, Wisconsin
- Mid-South Coliseum with Furbringer and Merrill G. Ehrman
