= Memphis Riverline Hotel =

Skyscraper hotel in Memphis, Tennessee, US

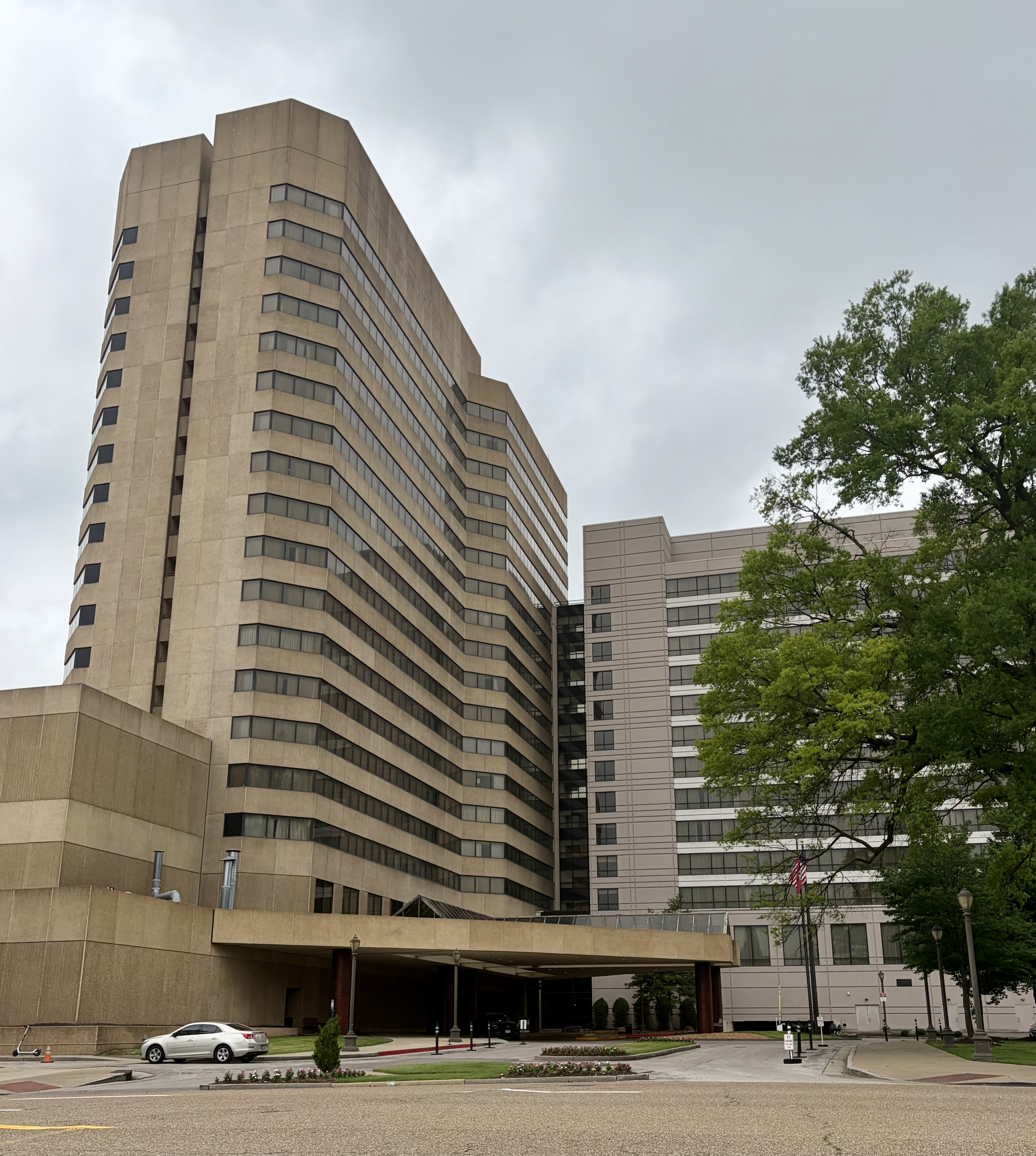
- The hotel viewed from Second Street in 2026
- Interactive map of the Memphis Riverline Hotel area
- Former names: Crowne Plaza Hotel (1985–1998), Marriott Memphis Downtown (1998–2013), Sheraton Memphis Downtown (2013–2026)

General information
- Location: 250 North Main Street, Memphis, Tennessee, U.S.
- Coordinates: 35°9′6″N 90°2′59″W
- Year built: 1983–1985
- Opened: July 13, 1985
- Renovated: 2001
- Cost: $43 million (equivalent to $129 million in 2025)

Technical details
- Floor count: 18

Design and construction
- Architect: Granville Taylor

Website
- Official website

The Memphis Riverline Hotel (formerly known as the Crowne Plaza Hotel, Marriott Memphis Downtown and Sheraton Memphis Downtown) is a convention center hotel in Memphis, Tennessee, United States. With 600 rooms, it is the largest hotel in Memphis. It is connected to the Renasant Convention Center and was built to help draw large conventions to the city.

Built and renovated with taxpayer financing, in its early decades the hotel did not generate enough revenue to repay those loans. In response to deteriorating conditions and the loss of convention business by Memphis, the city purchased the hotel in 2025. As of 2026, it is scheduled for a major renovation.

== Architecture ==
The main hotel building has 18 stories. The original plan had 12 stories, oriented diagonally, but was shifted during design by architect Granville Taylor to an east–west orientation to maximize views of the Mississippi River for guests and to provide a visual marker for the north end of the Main Street pedestrian mall.

The hotel lobby includes a 60-foot (18 m) atrium oriented toward the southwest. The pre-cast concrete used in the exterior was colored to match the Memphis Cook Convention Center, as it was known at the time. Interior finishes included brass, mahogany and marble.

== History ==
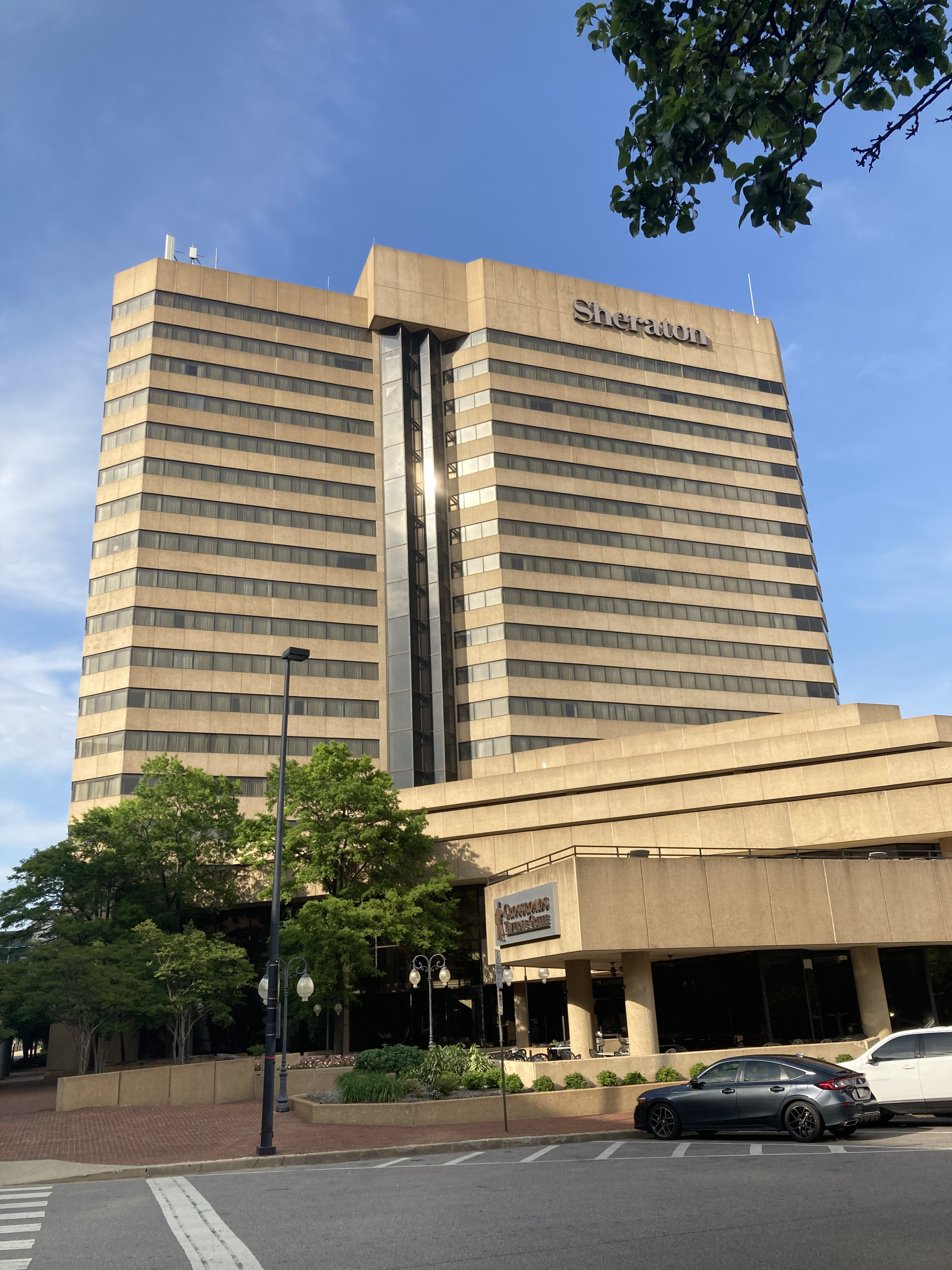
The south side of the hotel photographed with Sheraton branding in 2025

Planning for a large Memphis convention center hotel began in the 1970s. Plans to build a Hyatt Regency and a Radisson on the site across Main Street from the Cook Convention Center fell through. In 1982, Memphis and Shelby County made a $10 million (equivalent to $33 million in 2025) loan using state funds to support construction, which was also facilitated by the issuance of $23.5 million worth of privately financed and tax-free bonds. Progress remained slow, and in 1983 the Memphis Commercial Appeal editorial board complained that "nothing has vexed this community's effort to revitalize downtown more than building a downtown hotel," adding that the decision not to build a hotel simultaneously with the convention center, which opened in 1968, was resulting in Memphis losing convention business to new hotels in Little Rock and Nashville.

The Holiday Inn Crowne Plaza opened on July 13, 1985, with 406 rooms. It was the 13th hotel to open under the Crowne Plaza brand. The official "first guest" was a guest who had been the inaugural guest at Kemmons Wilson's original Holiday Inn, also located in Memphis. A grand opening was scheduled for September of that year. Its total cost of construction was $43 million (equivalent to $129 million in 2025). The hotel was one of four new buildings, including the Morgan Keegan Tower, in downtown Memphis in 1985 to surpass 15 stories.

In 1991, Shelby County's tax assessor assessed the historic Peabody Hotel at $9.4 million, substantially less than the then-406-room Crowne Plaza's $28.6 million (equivalent to $68 million in 2025) assessment. After concerns were raised about the assessment methodology, the county board that heard appeals cut the Crowne Plaza's assessment to $9 million, saving its owners nearly $400,000 (equivalent to $950000 in 2025) in annual property taxes. In 1995, the hotel dropped the "Holiday Inn" part of its name as part of the Crowne Plaza rebranding.

The sale of the Crowne Plaza to Host Marriott Corporation was announced in 1997 with plans to add a 200-room, 13-floor addition that would bring the hotel's room count to 600, surpassing the Peabody to make it the largest hotel in Memphis. The expansion coincided with an renovation of the Memphis convention center. In approving the deal, the Shelby County government waived repayment of the $10 million loan of state funds provided in 1982 to construct the hotel; the hotel had never generated enough revenue to make payments on the loan or on the tax-free bonds issued for its construction. The hotel was rebranded as the Marriott Memphis Downtown in 1998, and Marriott completed a $15 million renovation in May 2000, coordinated with renovations to the Cook Convention Center and the addition of the new Cannon Center for the Performing Arts.

In 2013, the hotel was rebranded as a Sheraton property. A 2017 shooting at the hotel following an attempted robbery on the hotel's seventh floor wounded two people and disrupted commencement ceremonies for the University of Tennessee Health Science Center at the adjacent convention center.

By 2024, the Sheraton had long been considered outdated and in need of major upgrades. Its design was described as "harsh," "monotonous" and "lacking in features that engage people," and customer reviews highlighted the hotel's dilapidated condition and a 2024 ant infestation in guest rooms. Decisions by convention organizers, such as the choice by the Memphis-based Church of God in Christ denomination to shift its annual convocation to St. Louis, were attributed to the hotel's deteriorated condition. In 2025, WREG-TV revealed emails showing that prospective convention hosts were avoiding holding events in Memphis and that prior event hosts would not return due to poor conditions at the hotel, where as many as 200 of its 600 rooms were not in service.

Rather than pursue a $226-million plan to renovate the hotel and add an additional 300 rooms, the hotel's owners put it on the market. In November 2025, the city of Memphis bought the hotel for $22 million and transferred it to a development company, which would assume the expense of renovating the hotel. The following year, the hotel dropped its Sheraton branding and adopted the name "Memphis Riverline Hotel". Renovations were set to take place in 2027 and 2028 and to be completed by 2029, at which point the hotel is intended to be rebranded as a Marriott property. The hotel is set to remain open during renovations and continue as part of the Marriott rewards program.

== See also ==
- List of tallest buildings in Memphis
