= White Station Tower =

i-Bank Tower
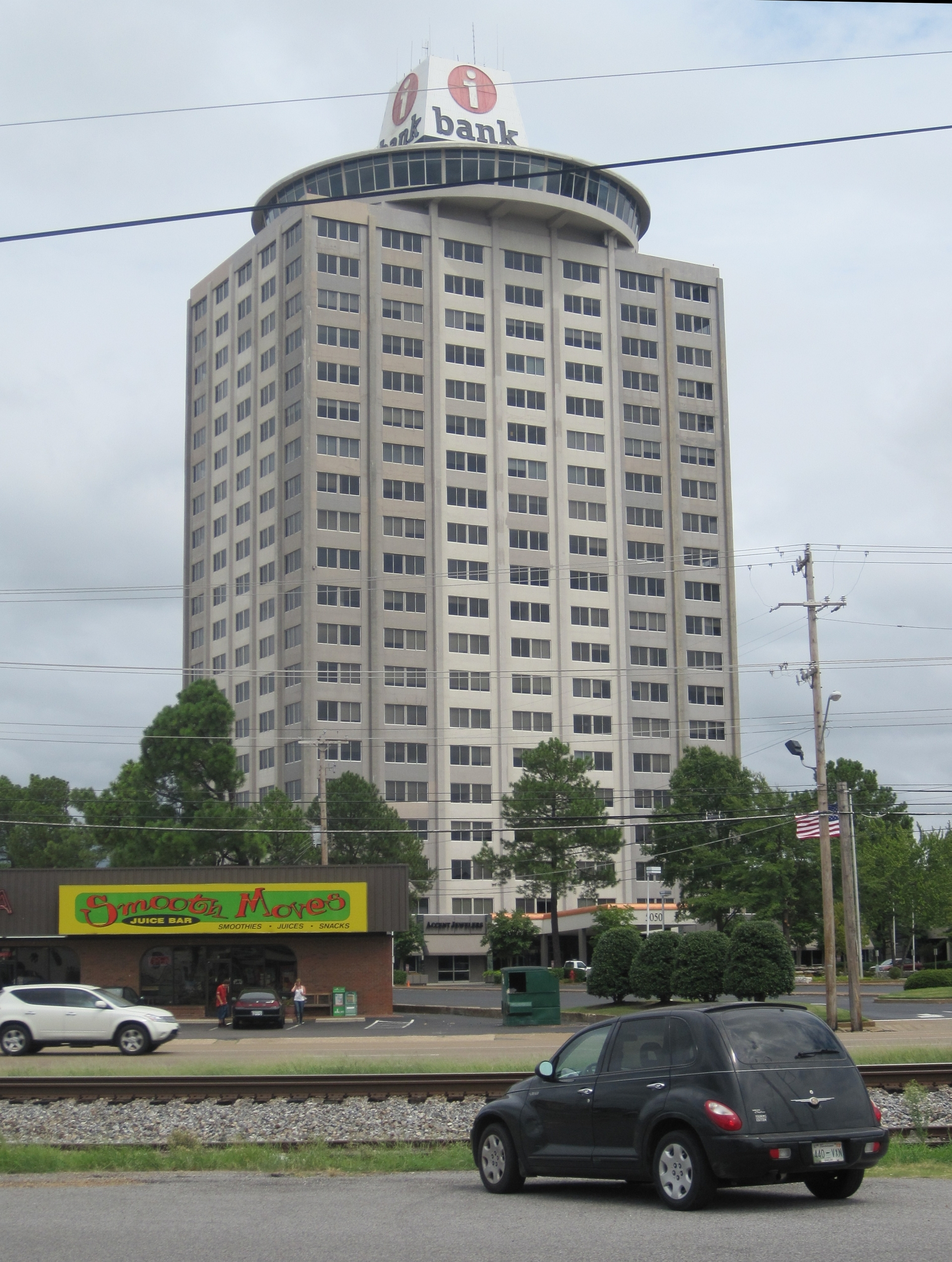
- Interactive map of the i-Bank Tower area

General information
- Status: Completed
- Type: Offices
- Architectural style: Modern
- Location: 5050 Poplar Ave Memphis, TN 38157, US
- Coordinates: 35.1132°N 89.8933°W
- Opening: 1965
- Owner: In-Rel Properties
- Management: In-Rel Properties

Height
- Roof: 274 ft (84 m)

Technical details
- Floor count: 22

Design and construction
- Architect: Robert Lee Hall

Other information
- Public transit access: MATA

i-Bank Tower is a 22-story, 274-foot-tall high-rise office building in Memphis, Tennessee, USA. It was designed by the Memphis-based architect Robert Lee Hall who also designed Clark Tower nearby. It is located at 5050 Poplar Avenue near White Station Road. Built in 1965, it was one of the first skyscrapers built away from the downtown skyline, about 15 miles away. When constructed, the top of the building was utilized as a revolving restaurant. However, it is now used as office space. The Memphis-based Independent Bank (or i-Bank) is headquartered in the building and its logo is illuminated on the top of the building (installed in the 2000s), replacing an old sign for Union Planters Bank. A similar logo was installed on the top of the One Commerce Square building downtown in June 2012 when another branch of the bank was opened.

== See also ==
- List of tallest buildings in Memphis
