= Sterick Building =

- U.S. National Register of Historic Places
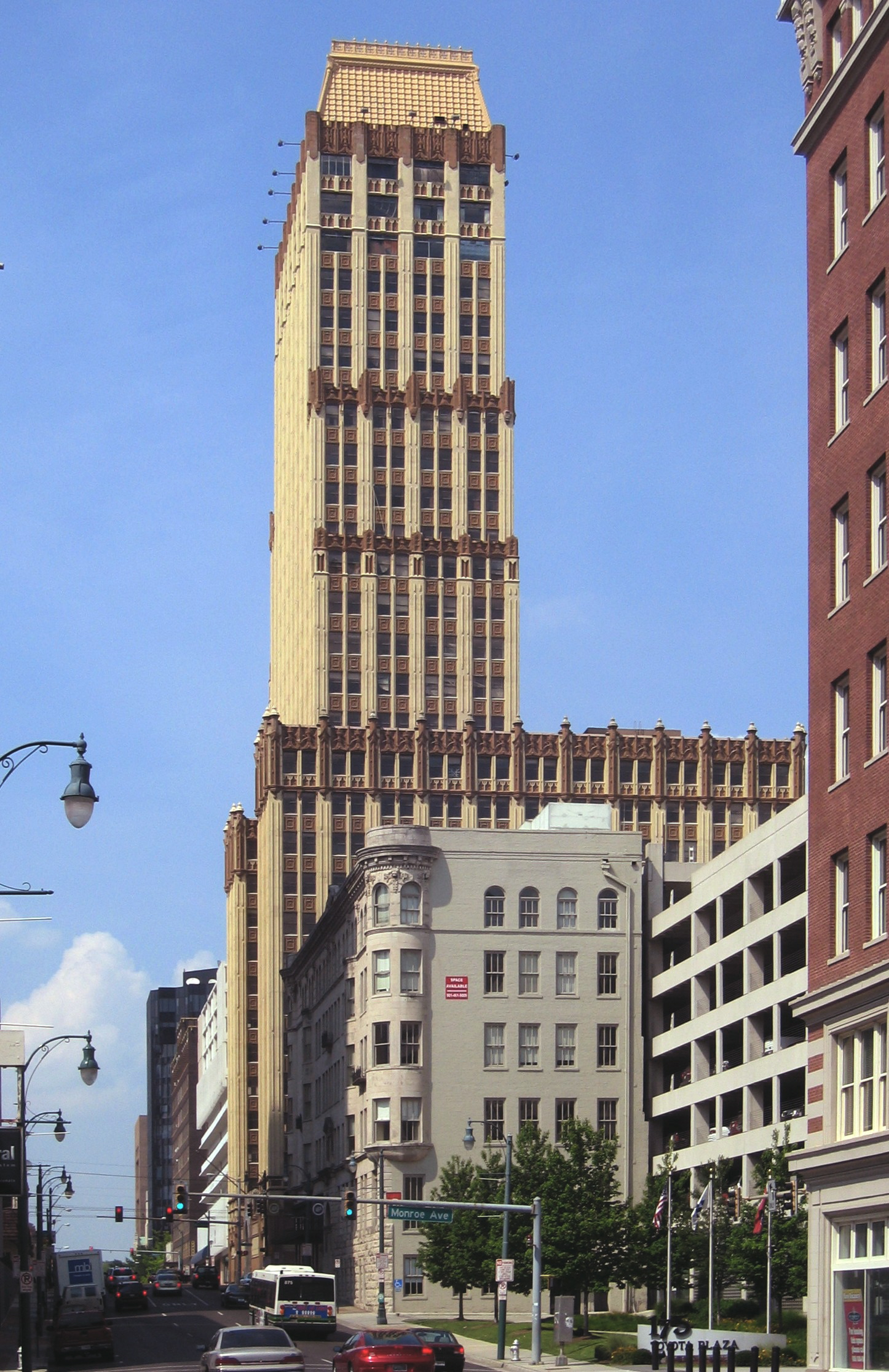
- The Sterick Building
- Location: 8 N. B.B. King Boulevard; Memphis, Tennessee
- Coordinates: 35°8′41.09″N 90°2′59.33″W
- Built: 1928
- Architect: Wyatt C. Hedrick
- Architectural style: Gothic Revival
- NRHP reference No.: 78002636
- Added to NRHP: October 2, 1978

Sterick Building
- Interactive map of the Sterick Building area

General information
- Location: Memphis, Tennessee
- Coordinates: 35°8′41.09″N 90°2′59.33″W
- Completed: 1928

Height
- Top floor: 365 feet (111 m)

Technical details
- Floor count: 29
- Floor area: 350,883 square feet (32,598.1 m^{2})

Design and construction
- Architect: Wyatt C. Hedrick

Other information
- Public transit: MATA; Main Street; Madison Avenue

The Sterick Building is a historic Gothic-style skyscraper in Memphis, Tennessee, 111 m (365 ft) tall with 31 floors, two of which are below grade. Its name is a portmanteau of the original owners' names, Texas Governor Ross S. Sterling and it's architect Wyatt C. Hedrick.

Completed in 1929, it was the tallest building in the American South and remained so until 1957.

Located at the corner of Madison Avenue and North B.B. King Boulevard, as of 2026 the Sterick is undergoing an extensive mixed-use redevelopment to include a hotel, apartments, and retail space.

== History ==
The Sterick Building is clad in limestone and had a crown with stone spires topped with a green tile roof; its own bank, pharmacy, barber shop, and beauty parlor; and stockbrokers' offices. It was also the regional headquarters for the FBI and Chrysler. The first three floors were clad in granite and limestone. Eight high-speed elevators served the building's 2,000+ occupants, providing access to the upper floors, including the Regency Room restaurant on the top floor.

In the 1950's, Sterick suite 1916 was the office location of Stars, Inc. principal, Bob Neal, who managed noted musicians Elvis Presley and Johnny Cash, among others. Neal established Elvis Presley Enterprises in February of 1955.

In 1956, New York real estate magnate, Lawrence Wien, purchased The Sterick and made significant cosmetic and systems upgrades, including adding air conditioning.

In 1994, the movie The Client featured the building.

== Decline ==
As new, more modern office buildings were built in downtown Memphis in the 1960s, the building began to lose tenants and—despite a number of alterations— (including being repainted from its original color to yellow and tan in 1982), it has been left vacant since 1986. It was added to the National Register of Historic Places in 1978.

The original development included a land lease arrangement wherein the developers leased the land underneath the building for 99 years, complicating subsequent redevelopment.

The land was owned by heirs of Napoleon Hill and the building lease was held by Equitable Life Insurance Company.

The original land lease for the property, dating from 1926, also stipulated the $1,500 monthly payment to be paid in gold coin “of standard weight and fineness or its equivalent.” An unsuccessful 1975 lawsuit by the land owners sought to recalculate the rent at the then-current price of gold, or roughly $13,500 per month.

== Recent events ==
Increasing residential growth in Downtown Memphis has made the Sterick Building, with its height and views over the Mississippi River, a candidate for residential conversion. Preservationists have also noted the possibility of tax credits and possible conservation easements for developers.

In March 2023, Constellation Properties, purchased the Sterick Building, resolving the longstanding ground lease that had separated the ownership of the building itself and the land underneath the building.

Constellation plans to revitalize the building and restore it importance to Downtown Memphis.

== Gallery ==
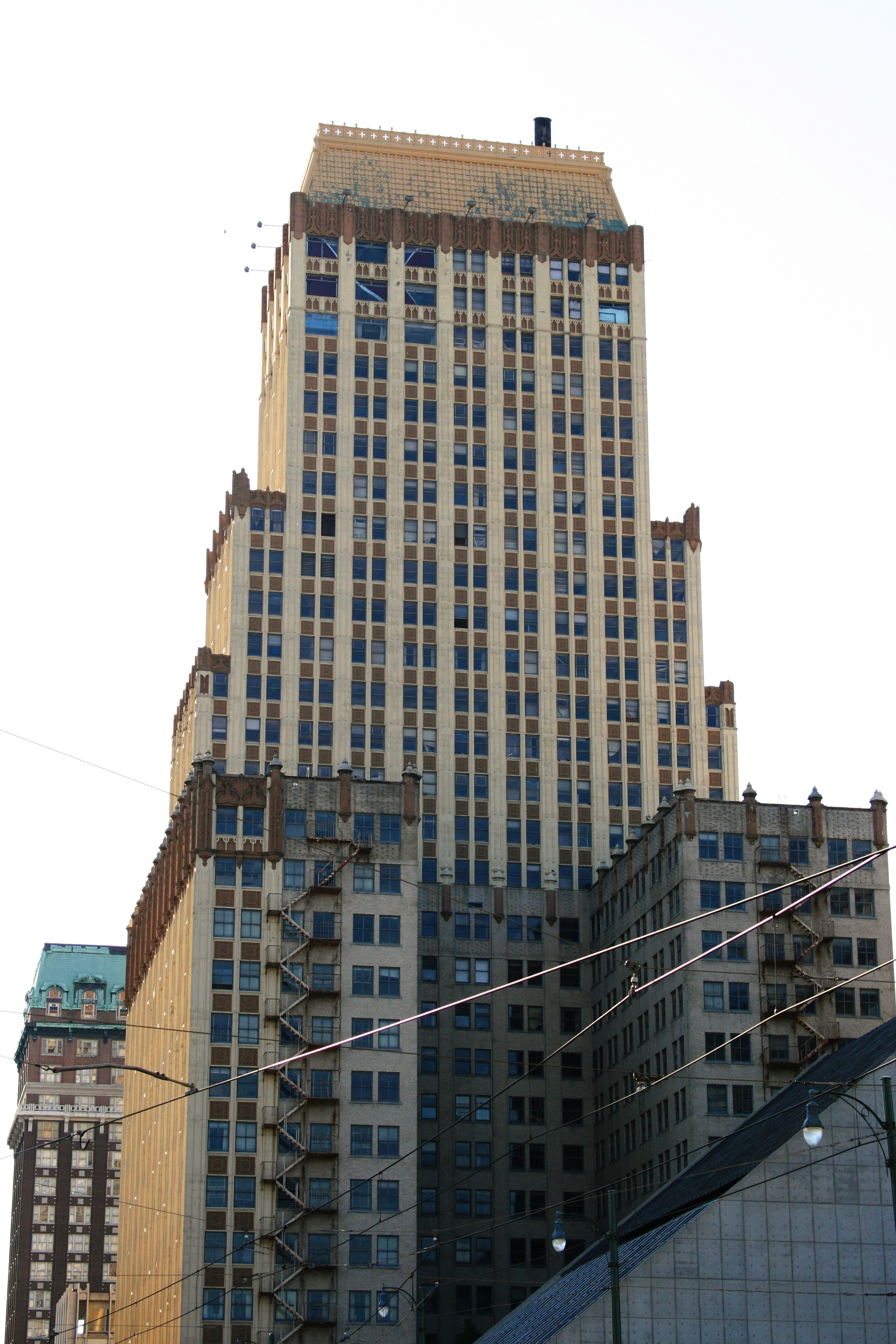
Backside view of the building, from Madison Ave.

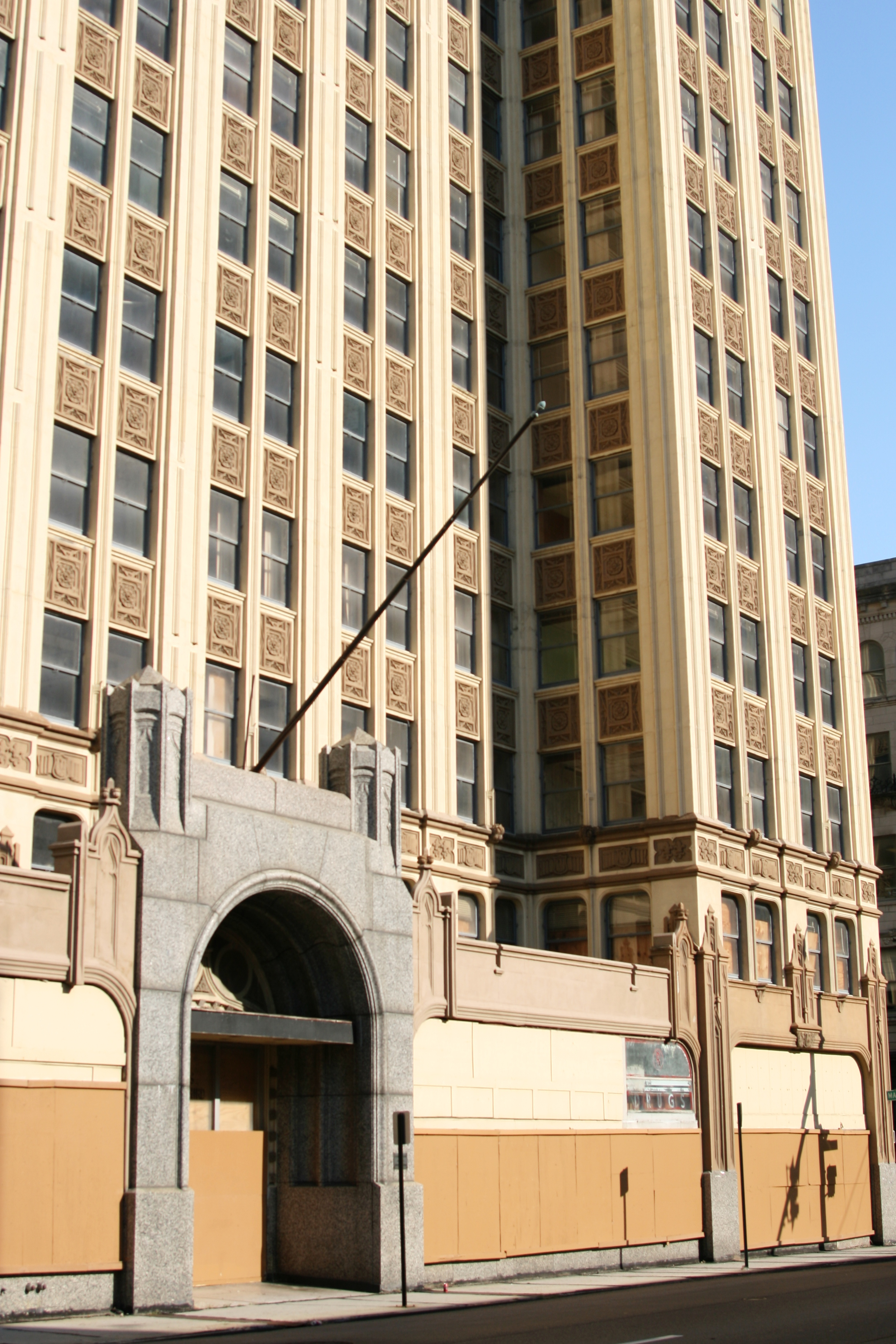
Boarded-up entrance and first floor

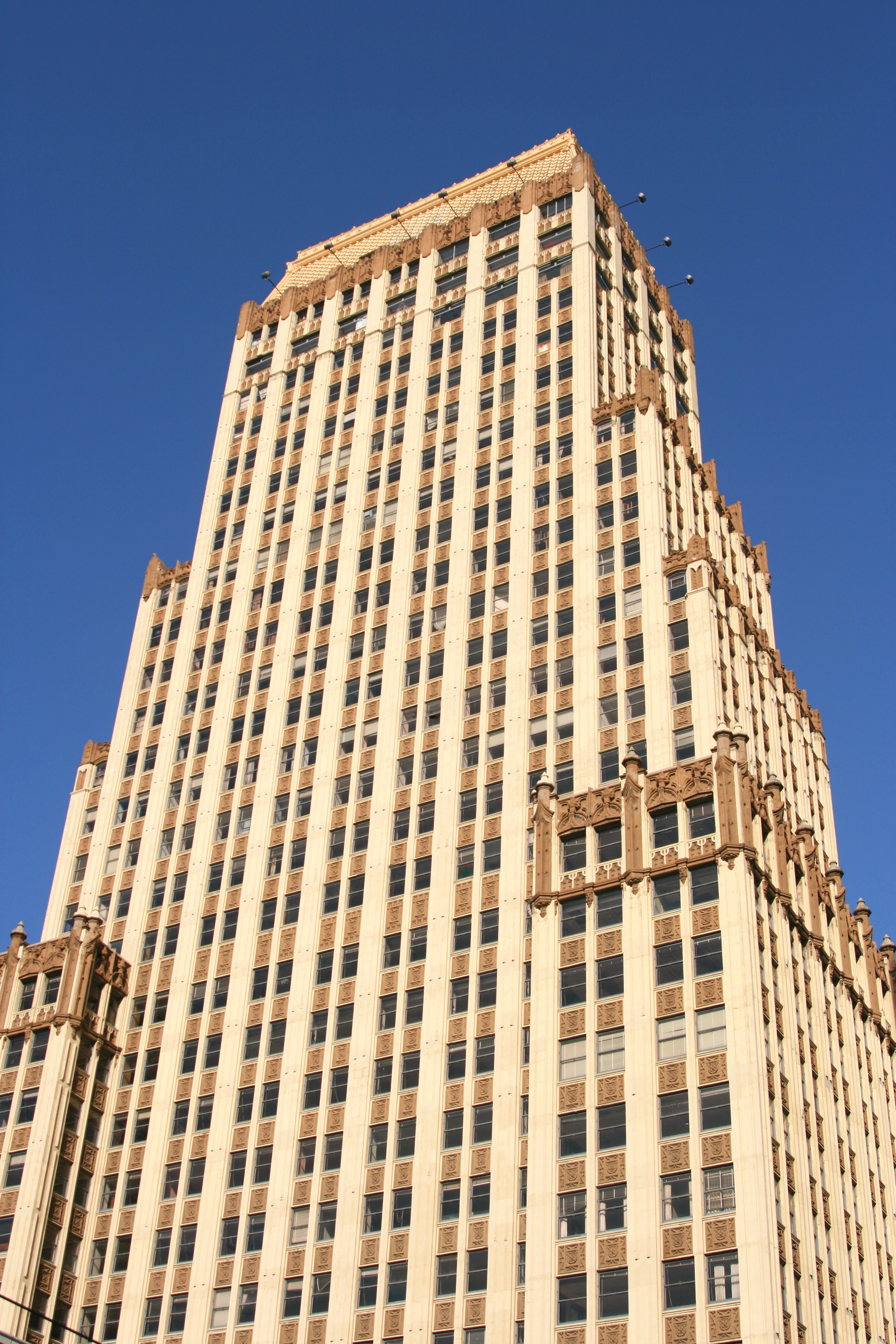
Front view

== See also ==
- National Register of Historic Places listings in Shelby County, Tennessee

Preceded by Lincoln American Tower	Tallest Building in Memphis; 1930 - 1965; 111m	Succeeded by 100 North Main
