= One Beale =

- Interactive map of the One Beale area

General information
- Status: Approved
- Location: Memphis, TN
- Coordinates: 35°8′25″N 90°3′28″W
- Estimated completion: 2024

Design and construction
- Architects: HBG Design, Cooper Carry
- Developer: Carlisle Development Company

Other information
- Public transit access: Main Street Line; Riverfront Loop One Beale LLC M&M Enterprises

One Beale is a proposed four-phase development in Memphis, Tennessee. Located at the corner of Beale Street and Riverside, the $400 million riverfront development located in downtown Memphis will include high-end apartments, a full-service Hyatt hotel, and space for restaurants and events stretching 5.5 acres from Beale Street to Pontotoc Avenue and along Front Street and west to the Mississippi River. As of October 2020, One Beale had three phases under construction valued at $200 million with another $200 million in the development pipeline.

== History ==
In December 2005, Gene Carlisle proposed a building at Beale Street and Riverside Drive in Downtown Memphis. The first phase of One Beale was a $150 million, 27 story condominium and hotel standing at 313 ft (95 m) tall. The tower was to feature 168 hotel rooms and 159 condos. The tower also featured 75,000 square feet (7,000 m^{2}) of class A office space. The architectural firm working on this project was Hnedak Bobo Group, Inc.

In August 2006, Gene Carlisle revised his proposal to include two towers. The northern tower was to be 30 stories tall and 436 ft (133 m) making it the tallest building in Memphis over 100 North Main which is 430 ft (130 m) tall. The southern tower was to be 27 stories tall. Together the proposal was for approximately 250 hotel rooms, 150 condos, 70,000 sq ft (6,500 m^{2}) of Class A office space, and 70,000 sq ft (6,500 m^{2}) of retail, commercial and meeting space.

On September 15, 2006, Land Use Control Board of Memphis unanimously approved the proposal for the tower.

The proposed towers were met with stiff opposition from residents of other buildings who complained that One Beale would block their view of the Mississippi River. Gene Carlisle responded to the opposition, "At the end of the day we're confident we'll be a great neighbor and we'll raise the property values in their part of the world. Of course, you can't please everybody and we've tried very hard to do that. We're very sensitive to this neighborhood. We've been there for a long time, almost 30 years."

On October 18, 2006, the building was unanimously approved by the Memphis City Council.

After a prolonged hiatus due to poor economic conditions, the One Beale project was revived in June 2014.

In December 2015, it was announced that Carlisle Corp. was considering adding a third tower to their development. The third tower, if built, would contain office space, reportedly in order receive federal grant money to help with the costs of modernizing the property's utilities. This plan was adjusted in April 2016, when it was announced that the hotel tower would be axed to make way for a larger office tower.

== New Development ==
After more than a decade of setbacks and plan revisions, on August 20, 2019, One Beale celebrated the construction start for One Beale, which promises to extend Beale Street's energy to the Mississippi River.

Chance Carlisle – Carlisle LLC CEO and lead developer for One Beale, provided new architectural renderings and updated the public on their plans for rental rates, restaurants and a development timeline.

- Phase 1: The 232-unit Landing apartments, already under construction; 16,000 square feet of office space; and 7,000 square feet of restaurants and retail space.

Opening in December 2020 were the first 100 of 232 apartments that will eventually wrap around a parking structure.

- Phase 2: The Hyatt Centric, an eight-story, 227-room hotel under construction at Beale and Front. It is scheduled to open March 3, 2021. Phase 2 includes 11,000 square feet of meeting space in two nearby and historic Ellis Machine Shop buildings.
- Phase 3: The boutique, 10-story hotel called Caption by Hyatt. Construction of the 136-room hotel should start in December and be complete by April–June 2022.

Phase 3 also includes two restaurants. One is the fine-dining Amelia Gene's, which will be in the Ellis & Sons Machine Shop building at the northwest corner of Front and Dr. Martin Luther King Jr. The other will be Charlotte's Sweet Shop & Speakeasy housed in the three-story Ellis & Sons Pattern Building at the northeast corner of Dr. Martin Luther King Jr. and Wagner.

- Phase 4: Originally set up as an office tower, the Grand Hyatt is now set to fill the site, with 350 hotel rooms and 43,000 square feet of meeting space. Construction is anticipated to start in October 2022 and wrap up in the fourth quarter of 2023 or first quarter of 2024.

Carlisle initially planned to develop an office tower that would have included 150 hotel rooms, and 240 condominiums and apartments. The company was set to finalize those plans in March 2020, but the emergence of COVID-19 put those plans on indefinite hold.

Carlisle's plan changed when Downtown Memphis Commission president Jennifer Oswalt asked him what he thought about restarting work on the site but changing the hotel from 150 rooms to 350 rooms.

After reviewing numbers and negotiating with the City of Memphis, Carlisle became convinced a large hotel was best for him and the city. "Our goal is to deliver to the city a hotel that can act as a bridge for the hotel rooms that were in the pipeline [prior to the pandemic] that we still need," Carlisle said. "We're trying to provide certainty … that our convention center … has the room-block agreements to be able to sell the space."

While not a convention center hotel for the Renasant Convention Center, Chance Carlisle agreed to a plan to provide a block of discounted rooms at the $190 million Grand Hyatt hotel, entering into a room-block agreement with the newly renovated Renasant Convention Center in downtown Memphis. One Beale's Hyatt Centric is also set to be included in the room-block agreement.

== School districts ==
One Beale would be zoned to the following Shelby County Schools campuses:

- Downtown Elementary School
- Vance Middle School
- Booker T. Washington High School
