= Elvis Presley Enterprises =

Corporate entity

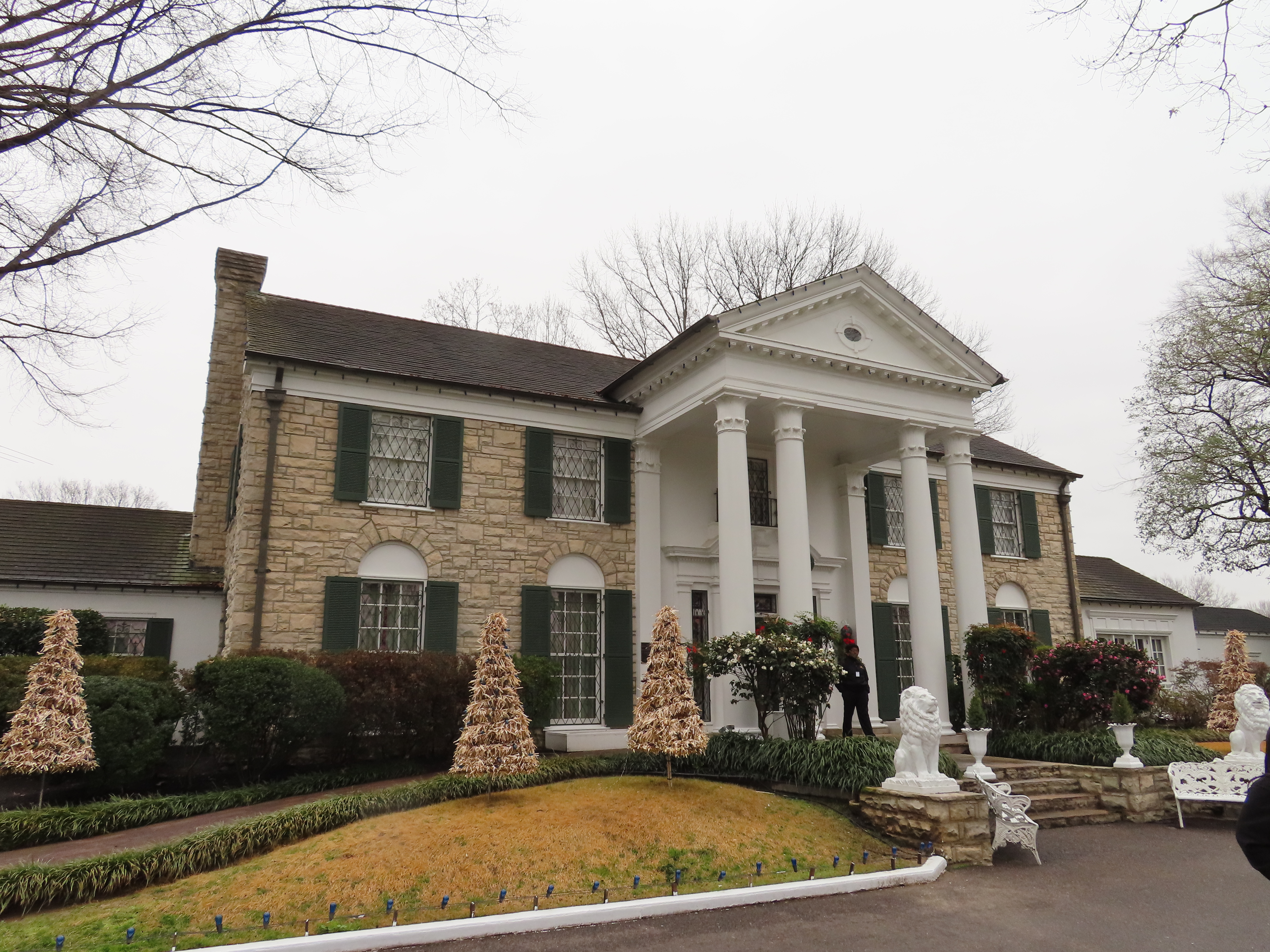
Graceland in 2019

Elvis Presley Enterprises, Inc. (EPE) is a corporate entity created by "The Elvis Presley Trust" to conduct business and manage its assets, including Graceland. EPE's business extends far beyond the Graceland operation, and includes worldwide licensing of Elvis-related products and ventures, the development of Elvis-related music, film, video, television and stage productions, the ongoing development of EPE's Internet presence and the management of significant music publishing assets.

== Origins ==
After Elvis Presley's death from cardiac arrhythmia and heart failure on August 16, 1977, at Graceland, his will appointed his father, Vernon Presley, as executor and trustee. The beneficiaries of the trust were Vernon, Elvis' grandmother Minnie Mae Presley, and his nine-year-old daughter Lisa Marie Presley. After Vernon's death in 1979, Elvis' ex-wife Priscilla Presley was named as one of three trustees by his will with the National Bank of Commerce in Memphis, which was the bank Elvis and Vernon had done business with, and Joseph Hanks, who had been Elvis and Vernon's accountant for a number of years. EPE was formally set up by Priscilla in 1979. With Minnie Mae's death in 1980, Lisa Marie became the last surviving beneficiary named in Elvis's will; she too died in 2023.

== Parker's dealings ==
Following Elvis' death, his manager "Colonel Tom" Parker had set up a licensing operation with Factors Etc. Inc, to control Presley merchandise and keep a steady income supporting his estate. Due to an ill-advised agreement between Parker and Elvis which gave RCA sole ownership of all his recording royalties prior to 1973, the estate was relying heavily on the income from Factors Etc. Inc. However, because Parker was still entitled to 50% of all Elvis' income, and after taxes were taken off, the overall amount going towards the upkeep of the estate was less than $1 million a year.

By 1980 the cost of running the estate was estimated to be as much as $500,000 a year. Priscilla and the Trust weren't prepared to let Parker continue to handle Elvis's business affairs, and petitioned the court to that end. However, Judge Joseph Evans, aware that Lisa Marie Presley was still a minor, appointed attorney Blanchard E. Tual to investigate Parker's management. His preliminary finding was that Parker's management deal of 50% was extortionate compared to the industry average of 15-20%. He also noted that Parker's handling of Elvis's business affairs during his lifetime, including the decision to sell off past royalties to RCA for $5.4 million in 1973, were "unethical" and poorly handled. During a second, more detailed investigation, all earnings were paid directly to the Trust instead of Parker. By this time, with the IRS demanding almost $15 million in taxes, the estate was facing bankruptcy.

On August 14, 1981, Judge Evans ordered EPE to sue Parker for mismanagement. In response to this, Parker countersued. The case against Parker was settled out of court in 1983, with the estate paying him $2 million, and the termination of his involvement in any Elvis related earnings for five years. He was also ordered to hand over any Elvis audio recordings or visual images that he owned.

== Opening of Graceland ==
During the court case Priscilla was advised to sell Graceland to avoid bankruptcy. She decided against this because did not want to sell her daughter's first home. In late 1981, the estate hired Jack Soden, at the time a Missouri investment counselor, to plan and execute the opening of Graceland to the public and oversee the total operation. Graceland opened for tours on June 7, 1982.

Interest in Graceland was such that EPE decided to expand its operation. In 1983, they acquired the shopping center plaza across the street from Graceland. The plaza was built in the sixties, and had been a typical suburban strip shopping center. However, after Elvis' death, it became filled with Elvis souvenir shops, which carried mostly bootleg items not licensed by the Presley Estate. In 1993, Graceland purchased the property and all the shops and attractions in what is now known as Graceland Plaza are owned and operated by EPE.

By the mid-1980s EPE was interested in securing the rights to Elvis' image and intellectual property. Following many court cases against business and private parties, EPE helped to push through new copyright and trademark legislation in the United States.

In 1991, Graceland was placed on the National Register of Historic Places, and in 1999 EPE purchased and redeveloped what became The Elvis Presley Heartbreak Hotel.

According to Sean O'Neal, "Elvis is a cultural icon today, but he didn't become that way simply because of his talent and good looks. There was money to be made ... so a company was founded to create this icon, and it has controlled his image ... ". The author describes EPE as a "well-run marketing machine" that runs on tight regulation of Elvis's images and lawsuits, when necessary. EPE, for instance, "absolutely refuses to license a product picturing an overweight Elvis". Since 1979 "EPE has filed more than a hundred lawsuits to assert the estate's exclusive right to Elvis's name and likeness". Later, EPE was wholly owned by the "Elvis Presley Trust" and Elvis' daughter, Lisa Marie Presley, until February 2005, when Robert F. X. Sillerman and his new media and entertainment company CKX acquired an 85% interest in Elvis Presley Enterprises, including its physical and intellectual properties. In November 2013, the company sold its 85% interest in EPE to Authentic Brands Group.

Lisa Marie Presley's estate retains a 15% ownership in the company and she continued to be involved until her 2023 death. Her mother Priscilla Presley is also actively involved in the company. Lisa Marie's estate retains sole ownership of the mansion itself, as well as her father's personal effects. Her assets are to be inherited by her three daughters.

The company endeavors to turn Elvis Presley's former estate into an international tourist destination.

== See also ==
- List of music artists by net worth
- Forbes list of the world's highest-paid dead celebrities
