= Clark Tower (Memphis, Tennessee) =

Building in Memphis, Tennessee

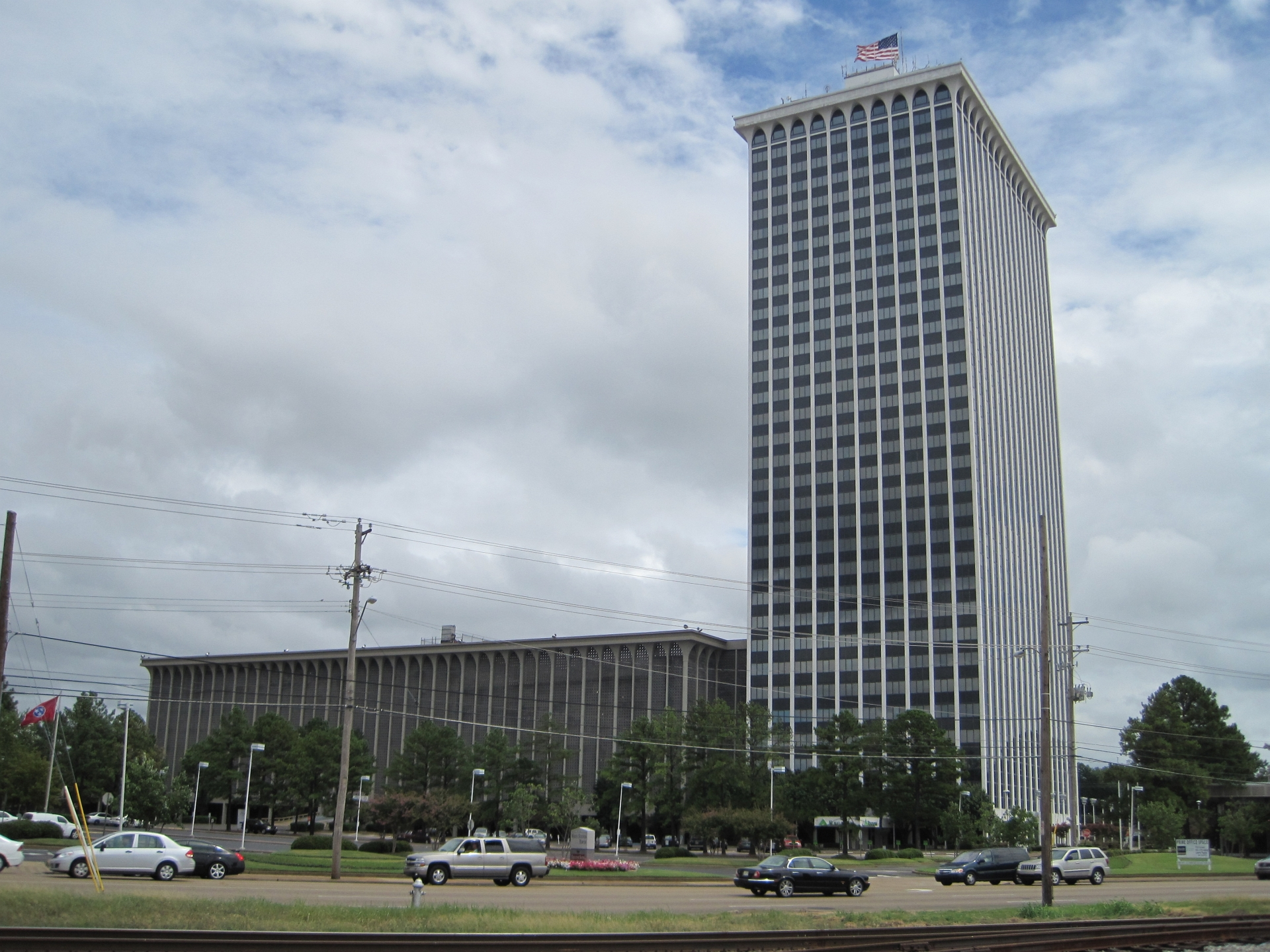
- Clark Tower in 2010

General information
- Status: Completed
- Type: Offices
- Architectural style: Modern
- Location: 5100 Poplar Ave # 711 Memphis, TN 38137, US
- Coordinates: 35.1121°N 89.8917°W
- Construction started: July, 1970
- Completed: July 9, 1971
- Opening: 1972
- Owner: In-Rel Properties, Inc.
- Operator: In-Rel Properties, inc.

Height
- Antenna spire: 400 ft (120 m)
- Roof: 365 ft (111 m)

Technical details
- Floor count: 34
- Floor area: 648,074 square feet (60,200 m^{2})
- Lifts/elevators: 6 low rise elevators (Floors 1-21); 6 high rise elevators (Floors 21-34); 1 freight elevator

Design and construction
- Architect: Robert Lee Hall
- Developer: William B. Clark, Sr.

Other information
- Public transit: MATA

Website
- clarktower.com

Clark Tower is a 34-story high-rise office building located at 5100 Poplar Avenue in the East Memphis neighborhood of Memphis, Tennessee. It was completed in 1972. The building is owned by Cicada Capital Partners and Eightfold Real Estate Capital L.P. and managed by Avison Young Management.

== History ==
Clark Tower was built in the early 1970s by developer William B. Clark Sr. It was constructed to the east of the smaller White Station Tower which Clark also developed in 1967. Clark Tower and its seven-story parking garage stand on land previously occupied by 27 homes along Harvey Road. When completed in 1971, Clark Tower was the largest office building in the Mississippi Valley between St. Louis and New Orleans. It was planned to be part of a large, interconnected, mixed-use development that was to include a 400-room high-rise hotel and a regional shopping mall. Another office tower, identical to Clark Tower, was planned at the corner of Mendenhall and Sanderlin. The high-rise hotel, mall and twin tower were never built, and the adjacent land was later developed for other commercial uses.

The building was designed by architect Robert Lee Hall, who also designed 100 North Main in downtown Memphis, as well as Patterson Hall at the University of Memphis. Construction began in July 1970, with a "topping out" on July 9, 1971. Its last major renovation was in 2004. It continues to be leased as Class A office space - the highest available.

Clark Tower was a major catalyst in the migration of the Class A office market away from downtown Memphis and into the eastern suburbs. With 649,000 square feet (60,300 m^{2}) of leasable space, it remains the largest commercial office building in the city.

== Design features ==
Clark Tower is one of the most recognizable landmarks to Memphis residents and visitors. Built on relatively high ground along Poplar Avenue, it can be seen easily from vantage points eight to ten miles (16 km) away, including Bartlett and Memphis International Airport.

Emporis.com lists the height of the building at 400 feet (120 m), which places it at either the 2nd or 3rd in the city behind 100 North Main and the Morgan Keegan Tower (if the latter's spire is included in measurements). It is by far the tallest building outside of downtown. The main roof of is at 365 feet (111 m), with a recessed penthouse and top cap located above. The building also has an attached, 7-story parking garage enclosed by a lattice-type exterior. The ground floor of this garage is retail space. Unlike the neighboring White Station Tower, Clark Tower does not have a subterranean parking garage.

Clark Tower was dismissed as an architectural "dud" by Eugene J. Johnson and Robert D. Russell Jr. in their 1990 book Memphis: An Architectural Guide. The authors claim that architect Hall was inspired by the works of Minoru Yamasaki, but failed to apply a proper sense of scale.

=== The 33rd floor ===
The 33rd floor of Clark Tower is now occupied by the catering firm Wade and Company. The space is open for private events. The former Tower Restaurant on the 33rd floor shut down in June 2010. The Tower Room was a public restaurant. For many years, the 33rd floor was occupied by the private Summit Club.

From outside wall of the 33rd floor forms arches just below the main roof.

== See also ==
- List of tallest buildings in Memphis
