= Parkway Towers =

Office building in Tennessee, US

- Interactive map of the Parkway Towers area

General information
- Status: Completed
- Type: Office building
- Location: 404 James Robertson Parkway; Nashville, Tennessee; United States
- Coordinates: 36°10′3.2″N 86°46′49.6″W
- Completed: 1986

Technical details
- Floor count: 21
- Floor area: 204,600 sq ft (19,010 m^{2})

Parkway Towers is a high-rise office building in downtown Nashville, Tennessee, located on James Robertson Parkway. The building contains several Tennessee state government agency offices, including the human resources divisions of the Board of Parole, Higher Education Commission, Tennessee Housing Development Agency, and Tennessee Student Assistance Corporation.

Considered a distressed property by real estate developers, the building was purchased by real estate investment firms Tourbinaeu Real Estate Partners and Realm for $12.5 million in 2025. In 2026, it was announced that the building's owners planned to convert it into a 331-room hotel.

== See also ==
- List of tallest buildings in Nashville
