= Memphis Trust Building =

- U.S. National Register of Historic Places
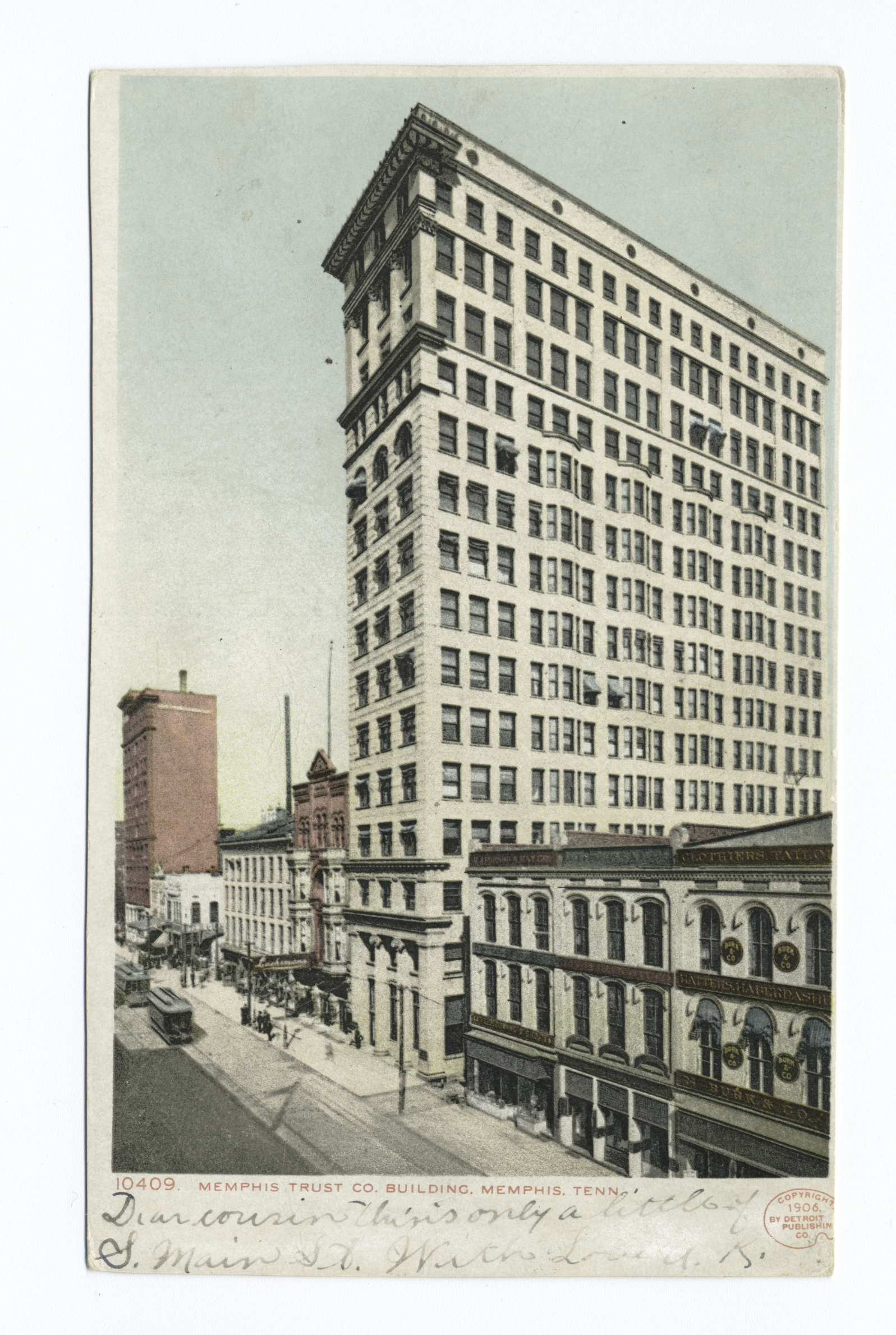
- Memphis Trust Building in the 1900s

- Location within Tennessee Location within the United States
- Location: 12 S. Main St., Memphis, Tennessee
- Coordinates: 35°8′40″N 90°3′9″W
- Area: less than one acre
- Built: 1904
- NRHP reference No.: 80003867
- Added to NRHP: November 25, 1980

The Memphis Trust Building is a historic building in Memphis, Tennessee, U.S.. It was built in 1904 for the Bank of Commerce and Trust. It was designed by Hanker & Cairns. It has been listed on the National Register of Historic Places since November 25, 1980.
