= National Bank of Commerce (Memphis) =

National Bank of Commerce was an American bank headquartered in Memphis, Tennessee, until it was taken over by SunTrust Banks in 2005.

== History ==
Bank of Commerce & Trust began in 1873. Its limestone Classical Revival building was built in 1929.

The 31-story One Commerce Square was completed in 1973 and has also been called the NBC Building and the SunTrust Building.

In 1982, when Thomas M. Garrott became president of National Bank of Commerce and its parent company National Commerce Bancorporation (NCBC), NBC had 24 branches in Memphis.

In 1985, NCBC made an arrangement with Kroger, which resulted in NBC branches being located inside grocery stores in Tennessee, Kentucky, Missouri, Arkansas, Mississippi and Alabama. The first in-store branch opened in Germantown, Tennessee, later that year. During 1985 and 1986, NBC entered the Nashville, Tennessee, and Knoxville, Tennessee, markets under the names "Nashville Bank of Commerce" and "NBC Knoxville Bank".

By 1988, NBC had 48 branches, 33 inside stores.

At the end of 1992, NCBC had total assets of $2.3 billion. Garrott became chairman when Bruce Campbell retired.

In 1993, NCBC bought the charter of First Federal Savings Bank of Belzoni, Mississippi, allowing NCBC to operate in more than one state. Later in the year, NBC entered Roanoke, Virginia.

In 1994, NCBC began a consulting subsidiary and entered the Raleigh-Durham, North Carolina, market.

In 1995 and 1999, U.S. Banker named NCBC the number one financial institution of the top 100 in the United States.

In 1996, NBC entered the Greensboro/Winston-Salem, North Carolina, market and north Georgia.

In 1997, NCBC and Ukrop's started First Market Bank, which the two companies owned jointly, with branches in Ukrop's Super Markets. This marked the company's entry into Richmond, Virginia. That same year, the company opened its first Wal-Mart branches.

At the end of the year, NCBC had $4.7 billion in assets and 128 branches, 109 in stores.

In 1998, NCBC bought First Citizens Bancshares Company of Marion, Arkansas; Bancshares of West Memphis in West Memphis, Arkansas; and First Community Bancorp of Cartersville, Georgia. NBC opened its first free-standing North Carolina branch May 1, 1998, in a former UCB in Raleigh, North Carolina; at that time 110 of its 130 branches were inside Kroger stores, 23 of those in North Carolina.

In 1999, BankINVESTOR named NCBC the top financial institution in the United States in terms of five-year results. That same year, NCBC bought First Financial Corporation of Mount Juliet, Tennessee, and entered the Charleston, West Virginia, market. NCBC also joined Standard & Poor's MidCap 400 Bank Index.

In 2000, NCBC bought Piedmont Bancorp. of Hillsborough, North Carolina.

Later that same year, NCBC agreed to a $1.94 billion "merger of equals" with Durham, North Carolina–based CCB, which had 208 branches and $8.2 billion in assets in March 2000. NCBC would be the surviving corporation. Corporate headquarters would stay in Memphis but Durham would be the operational headquarters. NCBC chairman and chief executive officer Garrott would become chairman, while CCB chairman and CEO Ernest C. Roessler would become CEO of the new company. The combination would give NCBC "market capitalization of about $4.2 billion, combined assets of $15 billion, deposits of $11.3 billion and 370 branches in eight states". Wachovia Securities vice president John B. Moore pointed out that NCBC "is the first major out-of-state bank to come into North Carolina, which is a highly competitive, very concentrated market."

Unlike CCB, which grew by buying other banks, NBC added new markets, with a strategy of one free-standing branch for every three in-store locations.

NCBC had $7.3 billion in assets and 162 National Bank of Commerce (NBC) branches in Tennessee, Georgia, Mississippi, Virginia, West Virginia, Arkansas and North Carolina.

In April 2001, National Commerce Bancorporation changed its name to National Commerce Financial Corporation. In July 2001, National Commerce Financial Corporation received approval to list its stock on the New York Stock Exchange using the symbol NCF.

Later in July 2001, NCF announced the $126 million purchase of SouthBanc Shares, Inc. of Anderson, South Carolina, which had 11 branches and $671 million in assets, $508 million in loans and $452 million in deposits in the Greenville-Spartanburg area.

Also in 2001, NCF bought First Vantage Bank of Knoxville, Tennessee, and announced a plan to locate ten branches inside Bi-Lo stores in South Carolina.

Later in 2001, NCF announced it would enter the Atlanta, Georgia, market with 30 Kroger branches, and the Savannah, Georgia, market with four.

As a result of the First Union-Wachovia merger, NCF bought twelve branches of the former First Union and Wachovia banks in Georgia and Virginia which would become NBC branches. 25 other branches became CCB locations as of February 15, 2002, and one became a First Bank.

When Garrott announced his retirement in April 2002, NCF had 447 branches, 156 of them in stores, in nine states.

In 2003, NCF and Wal-Mart started Wal-Mart Money Centers, located inside Wal-Marts.

In April 2004, NCF announced it would locate 70 NBC branches inside Wal-Marts in Florida and Georgia, marking the company's entry into Florida. Three-fourths of the branches would be in Florida, in such areas as Jacksonville, Orlando, and Tampa-St. Petersburg. NBC already operated Wal-Mart branches in the Chattanooga, Tennessee, area. At the time, the planned NBC branches were not being called Wal-Mart Money Centers. NCF had about 1250 employees and nearly 500 branches.

In May 2004, NCF announced it would merge with SunTrust, making SunTrust the seventh-largest bank in the United States. Several Kroger branches in the Nashville, Tennessee, and Durham, North Carolina, areas were merged into U.S. Bank branches. Also announced at that time were the fates of NCF's major executives. NCF chief operating officer Richard Furr would head the Carolinas group. Scott Edwards, chief administrative officer, would become head of credit for the Carolinas and be based in Durham. Robert Jones would succeed the retiring Richard Glover as Triangle-area president. John Stallings, NCF head of retail banking, would oversee SunTrust's Carolinas group retail business. NCF Atlanta region president would take over the Carolinas group commercial and commercial real estate areas.
