= Exchange Building (Memphis) =

1910 skyscraper in Memphis, Tennessee

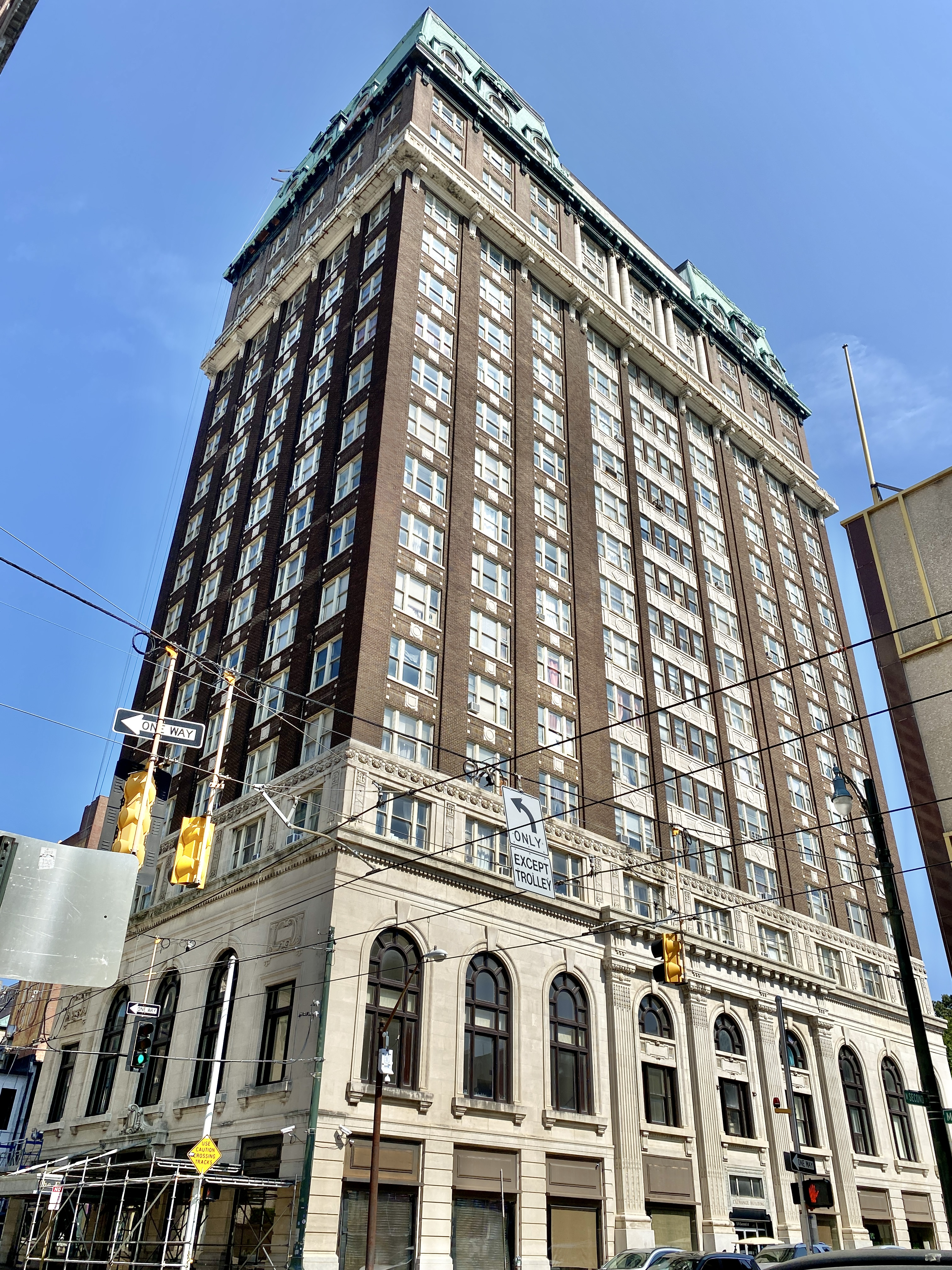
- Interactive map of the Exchange Building area
- Former names: Memphis Cotton Exchange & Merchant Exchange

General information
- Architectural style: Beaux Arts
- Location: 9 North Second Street, Memphis, Tennessee
- Coordinates: 35.145275°N 90.051767°W
- Completed: 1910

Height
- Height: 264.0 feet (80.5 m)

Technical details
- Floor count: 19
- Floor area: 217,244 square feet (20,182.6 m^{2})

Design and construction
- Architect: Neander Montgomery Woods

Other information
- Public transit: MATA; Main Street Line

The Exchange Building is a 19-story skyscraper, which was formerly known as the Cotton Exchange and the Merchants Exchange', and is the twelfth-tallest building in Memphis, Tennessee. It should not be confused with the Memphis Cotton Exchange which is located on Front Street and Union Avenue. The Exchange Building is located at the corner of Second Street and Madison Avenue in downtown Memphis, Tennessee. It is 264.0 feet (80.5 m) tall and has 217,244 square feet (20,182.6 m^{2}) of living space. The building is made of steel and concrete, and employs many decorative elements including Tennessee marble, granite, and detailed plaster work.

== Location ==
The building, which has an alternate address of 130 Madison Avenue, sits on 0.25 acres at the northwest corner of Madison Avenue and Second Street, just south of Court Square, Memphis.

== History ==
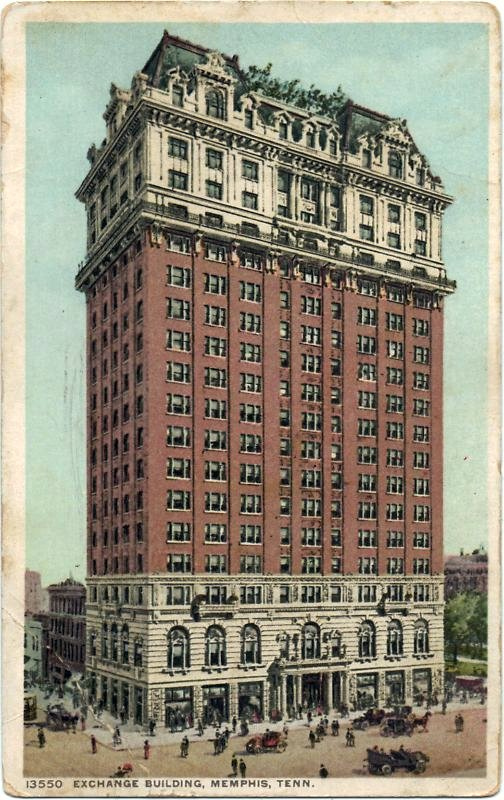
Postcard of the Exchange Building in 1911. The decorative top of the building was actually red brick rather than white.

The building was built in 1910 by the Memphis Cotton and Merchants Exchange. Locally, it became known as the "Exchange Building." The building was designed by Memphis architect Neander Montgomery Woods Jr. in the Beaux Arts style.

The Exchange Building was added to the National Register of Historic Places in 1979. The building is listed as the Memphis Merchants Exchange in the National Register of Historic Places listings in Shelby County, Tennessee.

== Current use ==
The building is used as a mixed use building with hotel units and residential apartments, with occupancy that includes the top floors. Conversion to residential use was completed in 1996. The building houses 202 units, including handicap equipped housing units.

== See also ==
- List of tallest buildings in Memphis
- Downtown Memphis
- National Register of Historic Places listings in Shelby County, Tennessee
