= Raymond James Tower =

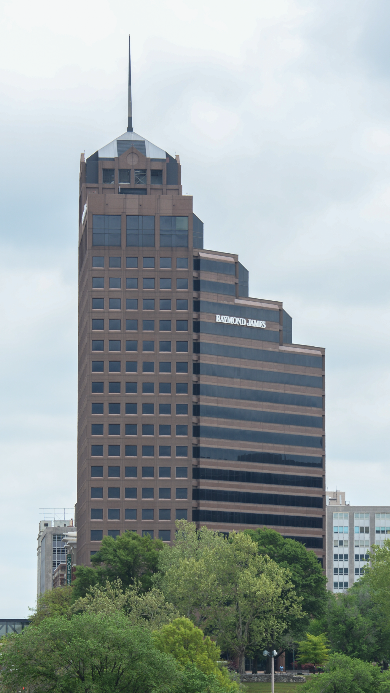
- Raymond James Tower
- Interactive map of the Raymond James Tower area
- Former names: Morgan Keegan Tower
- Alternative names: Rucker Companies Tower

General information
- Architectural style: Postmodern
- Location: 50 North Front Street, Memphis, Tennessee
- Coordinates: 35.147167°N 90.053061°W
- Current tenants: KPMG
- Completed: 1985
- Owner: Madison Realties LLC.
- Landlord: Madison Realties LLC.

Height
- Height: 396.0 feet (120.7 m)

Technical details
- Structural system: Steel
- Floor count: 21
- Floor area: 338,213 sq ft (31,421.0 m^{2})

Design and construction
- Architecture firm: 3D/International
- Main contractor: Lowery Companies, LLC.com

Other information
- Public transit: MATA; Main Street Line; Riverfront Loop

Raymond James Tower is a 21-story skyscraper and is the second tallest building in Memphis, Tennessee. The building is located at the corner of North Front Street and Jefferson Avenue and South Main Street. It is 403.0 feet (122.8 m) tall, including a 61.0 feet (18.6 m) spire, and has 334,668 square feet (31,091.7 m^{2}) of office space.

It was owned by Orlando, Florida based Parkway Properties, which had owned the building since 1997 until 2016. The company once owned six other buildings in Memphis, but has since sold them off. As of July 2008, the building was 100% occupied.

== Structure ==
The building is clad in carmen red flame cut and polished granite, and is topped with a 61-foot spire, which is a distinctive feature of the Memphis skyline.

In a nod to the past, the four giant stone griffins — a mythological creature with the body of a lion and the wings and head of an eagle - that adorned the former Hotel King Cotton are displayed in the atrium of the Raymond James Tower.

== History ==
The site was previously occupied by the Hotel King Cotton, a 12-story high-rise hotel built in 1927. The building demolition was performed by Memphis Wrecking Company and Controlled Demolition, Inc. in April 1984.

The building was developed by Lowery Companies, LLC., and was designed by 3D/International of Houston.

It was home to Raymond James, formerly known as Morgan Keegan & Company. Raymond James was the anchor tenant. As of February 2021, Raymond James has moved to two East Memphis locations. Other tenants include KPMG, Dr. Kelli Dumas DDS, and several local law firms.

== See also ==
- List of tallest buildings in Memphis
