= One Commerce Square =

Building in Memphis, Tennessee

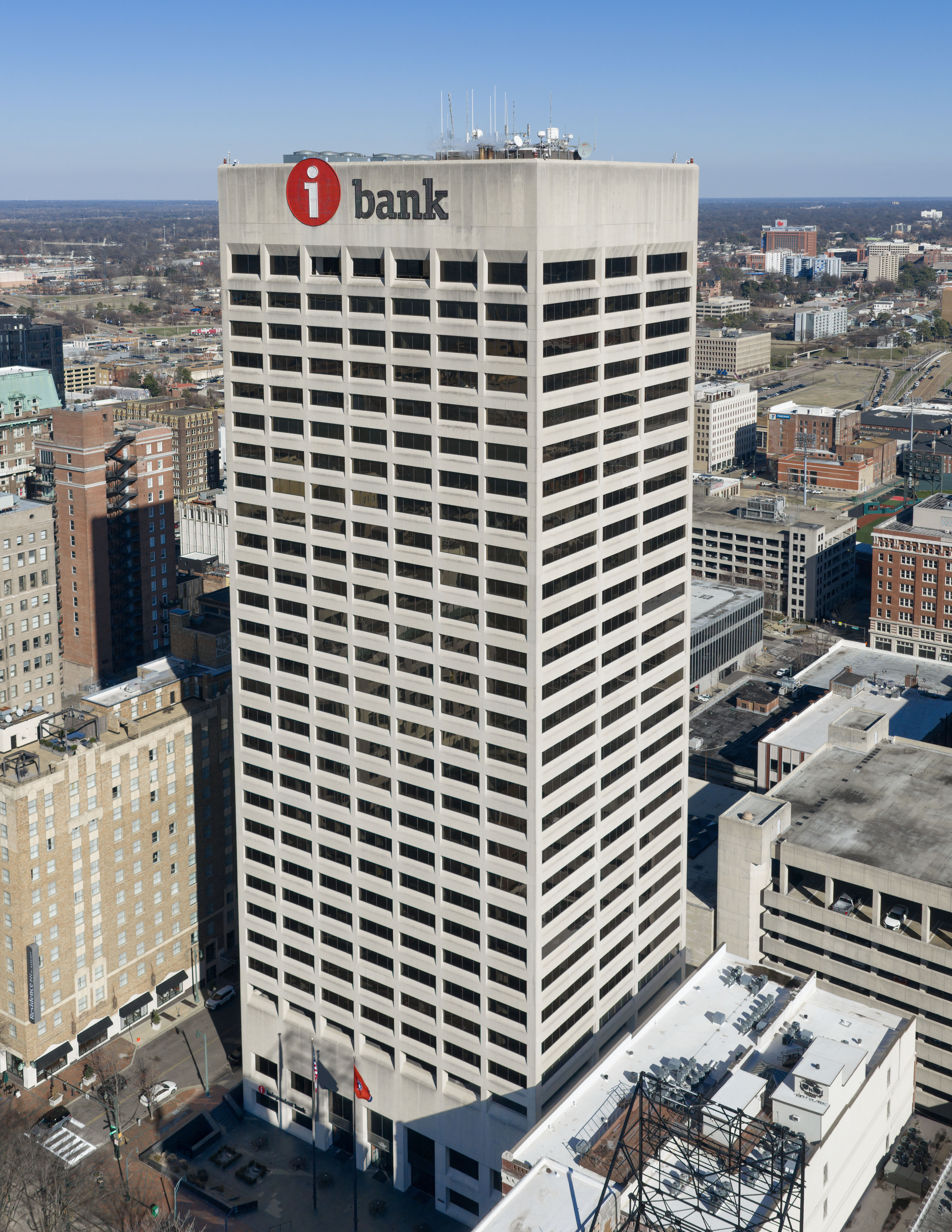
- Former names: National Bank of Commerce Building, Sun Trust Bank Building
- Alternative names: iBank Building

General information
- Architectural style: Modern
- Location: 40 South Main Street, Memphis, Tennessee
- Coordinates: 35.143823°N 90.052885°W
- Completed: 1972
- Owner: Memphis Commerce Square Partners

Height
- Height: 396.0 feet (120.7 m)

Technical details
- Floor count: 30
- Floor area: 503,999 sq ft (46,823.0 m^{2})

Design and construction
- Architecture firm: Roy P. Harrover & Associates

Other information
- Public transit: MATA; Main Street Line

Website
- http://www.onecommercesquare.com

One Commerce Square is a 30-story skyscraper in Downtown Memphis which is locally referred to as the "iBank Tower". The building was formerly known as the NBC Building and the SunTrust Building, and is the fourth tallest building in Memphis, Tennessee. The building is located at the corner of Monroe Avenue and South Main Street.

== History ==
=== Construction ===
Construction started in 1972 by the National Bank of Commerce (NBC), and the building was completed in 1973, preserving the original bank lobby that was built in 1929. One Commerce Square represents a modernism architectural style and is currently a Class A multi-tenant commercial office building in downtown Memphis. It was designed by local Memphis architect Roy Harrover who also designed the Memphis International Airport and Memphis College of Art. Locally, it became known as the "NBC Building." In 1984, NBC sold the building for $46.1 million.

=== Foreclosure ===
The building was purchased in 1999 for $31.5 million by Jacksonville, Florida–based Southcoast Capital Group, which operated as One Commerce Square LLC. However, One Commerce Square LLC defaulted on a $24.5 million loan dated December 20, 2002, through Archon Financial LP.

=== Memphis Commerce Square Partners ===
On October 30, 2009, Park National Bank was taken over by the Federal Deposit Insurance Corporation and the bank's assets were sold to U.S. Bancorp. In December 2010, a local investment group known as Memphis Commerce Square Partners purchased the building from U.S. Bancorp. Management is by Avison Young.

In 2015, One Commerce Square became the first building in Memphis to attain LEED gold certification after cutting energy usage by 45 percent through renovations.

== Tenants ==
One Commerce Square houses the headquarters of Cargill Cotton and Hnedak Bobo Group (HBG), Memphis's largest architecture firm.

=== Former Tenants ===
==== SunTrust ====
In 2005, NBC, still the anchor tenant of the building at the time, was acquired by SunTrust Banks, and the building became known as the SunTrust Building. The building suffered a major blow when its anchor tenant, SunTrust, vacated 155,000 square feet (14,400 m^{2}) in the building when its lease ended in January 2009.

==== Pinnacle Airlines ====
On October 8, 2010, regional airline Pinnacle Airlines Corp. announced that it intended to move over 600 employees that would occupy 155,000 square feet (14,400 m^{2}) on 12 floors of One Commerce Square. The Downtown Memphis Commission helped attract Pinnacle by providing $5 million of a total $20 million public/private investment, along with the city of Memphis, to refurbish the building and provide below-market rental rates to new and existing tenants. The move took place in the autumn of 2011, contingent on a lease with the potential ownership group of Lynch-Schledwitz-Prosterman. The architecture firm of Looney Ricks Kiss designed a makeover of the building. However, Pinnacle Airlines announced in January 2013 that it would relocate to Minneapolis, thereby vacating the space in One Commerce.

==== Southern Airways Express ====
Southern Airways Express launched operations in June 2013, with its first flight taking place on Wednesday, May 29, with an inaugural flight for industry partners and members of the media from Memphis to Destin. Stan Little, chairman and CEO, answered the first phone call after the airline moved into its new office headquarters in One Commerce. On March 7, 2016, Southern announced the acquisition of Fort Lauderdale-based Sun Air Express. Following the acquisition of Sun, the operational headquarters of Southern Airways was relocated from Memphis to Pompano Beach, Florida.

== See also ==
- List of tallest buildings in Memphis
