= Hu. Hotel =

- Tennessee Trust Building
- U.S. National Register of Historic Places
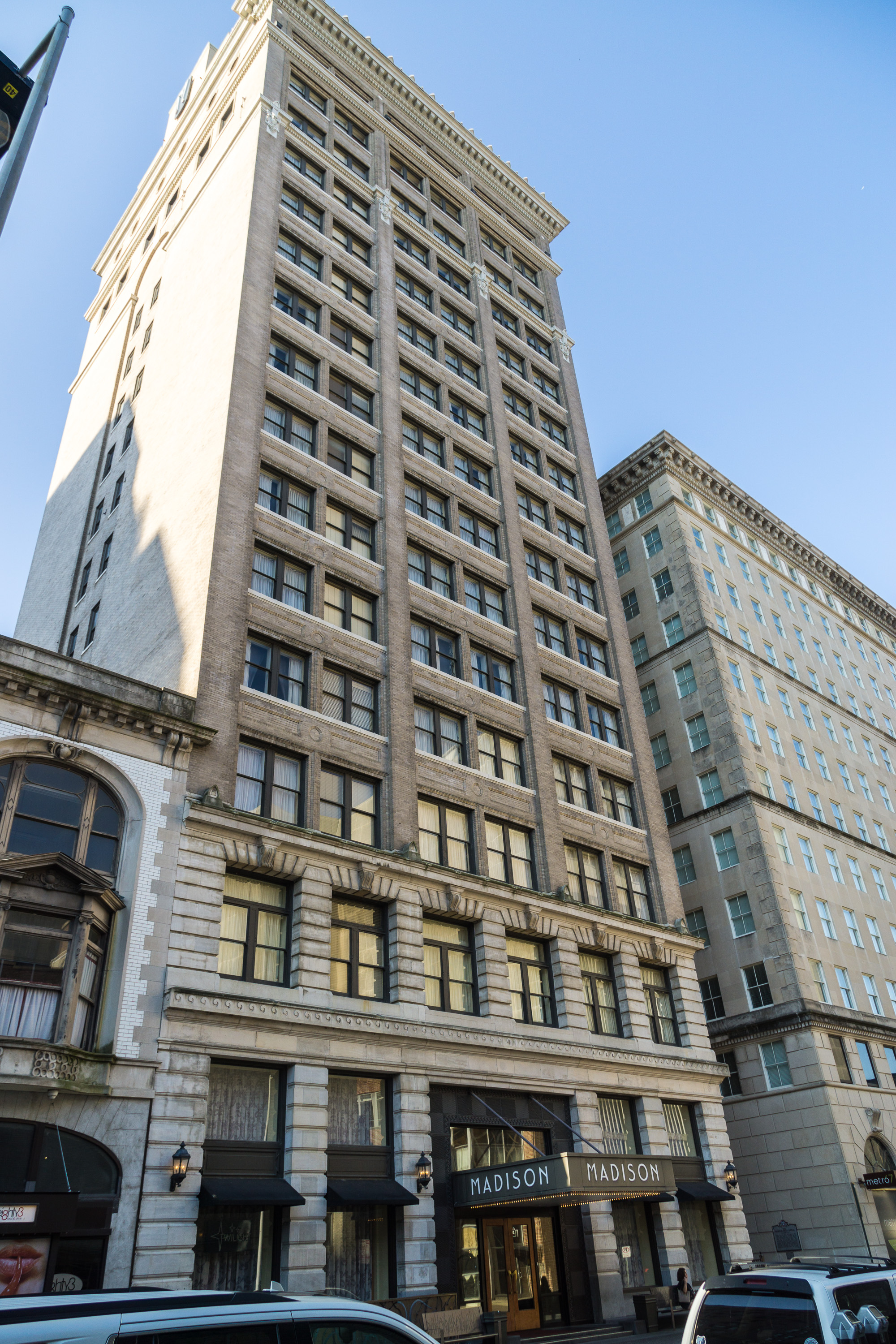
- Hu. Hotel in downtown Memphis.

- Location within Tennessee Location within the United States
- Location: 81 Madison Ave., Memphis, Tennessee
- Coordinates: 35°08′43″N 90°03′12″W
- Built: 1906
- Architect: Shaw, George M.; Pfeil, Charles O.
- Architectural style: Beaux-Arts
- NRHP reference No.: 82001732
- Added to NRHP: December 09, 1982

The Hu. Hotel is a luxury boutique hotel in Downtown Memphis, Tennessee, United States, located in the historic former Tennessee Trust Bank building.

== History ==
=== Construction ===
Built in 1905, the 14-story Tennessee Trust Building was among downtown Memphis' first "skyscrapers." The building's architects, the firm of Charles O. Pfeil (1871–1952) and George M. Shaw (1870–1919) were noted at the time for designing buildings with ornate, classical styling and massing. The building was constructed with a large underground vault, which is currently re-purposed as the hotel gym. The scroll pattern on the west facade of the Tennessee Trust Building is visible on other downtown Memphis buildings from the era designed by Shaw & Pfeil. For instance, the firm's Memphis Fire Engine House #1 (1910) and the Memphis Police Station (1911) are on the National Register of Historic Places. The Tennessee Trust Building was added to the National Register of Historic Places in 1982.

=== Hotel conversion ===
In 2002, Unison Hotel Co. acquired the deteriorating structure and converted it into an upscale 110-room boutique hotel, the Madison Hotel. In 2016, the hotel was sold to the Chicago-based Aparium Hotel Group, which renamed it the Hu. Hotel in 2018.

== Gallery ==
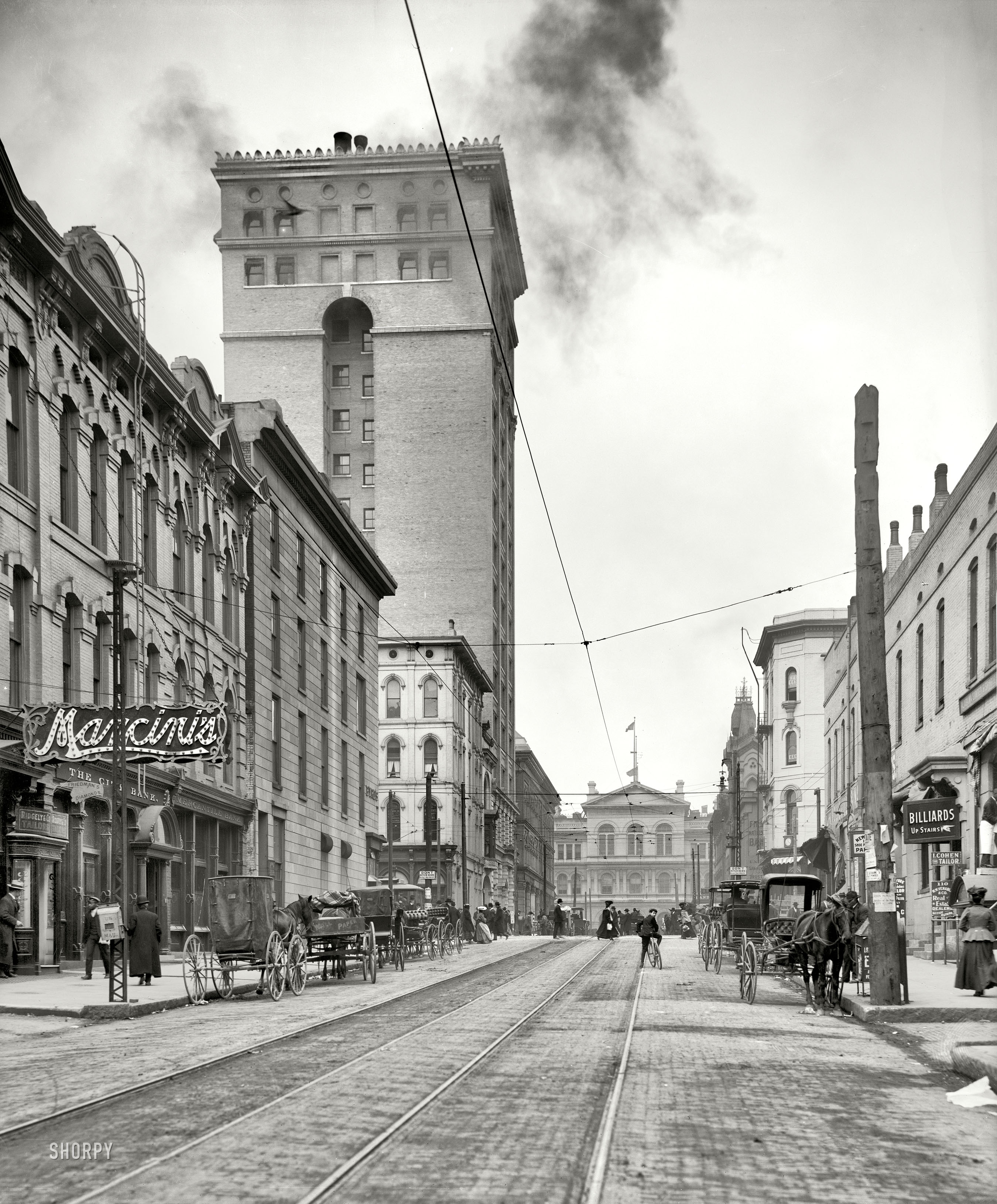
View west on Madison Avenue, with the building prominently featured on the left (1906)

Awning of Madison Hotel, with The University of Memphis, School of Law in the background

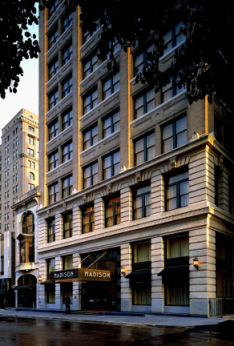
