= First Horizon Bank Tower =

Office building in Memphis, Tennessee

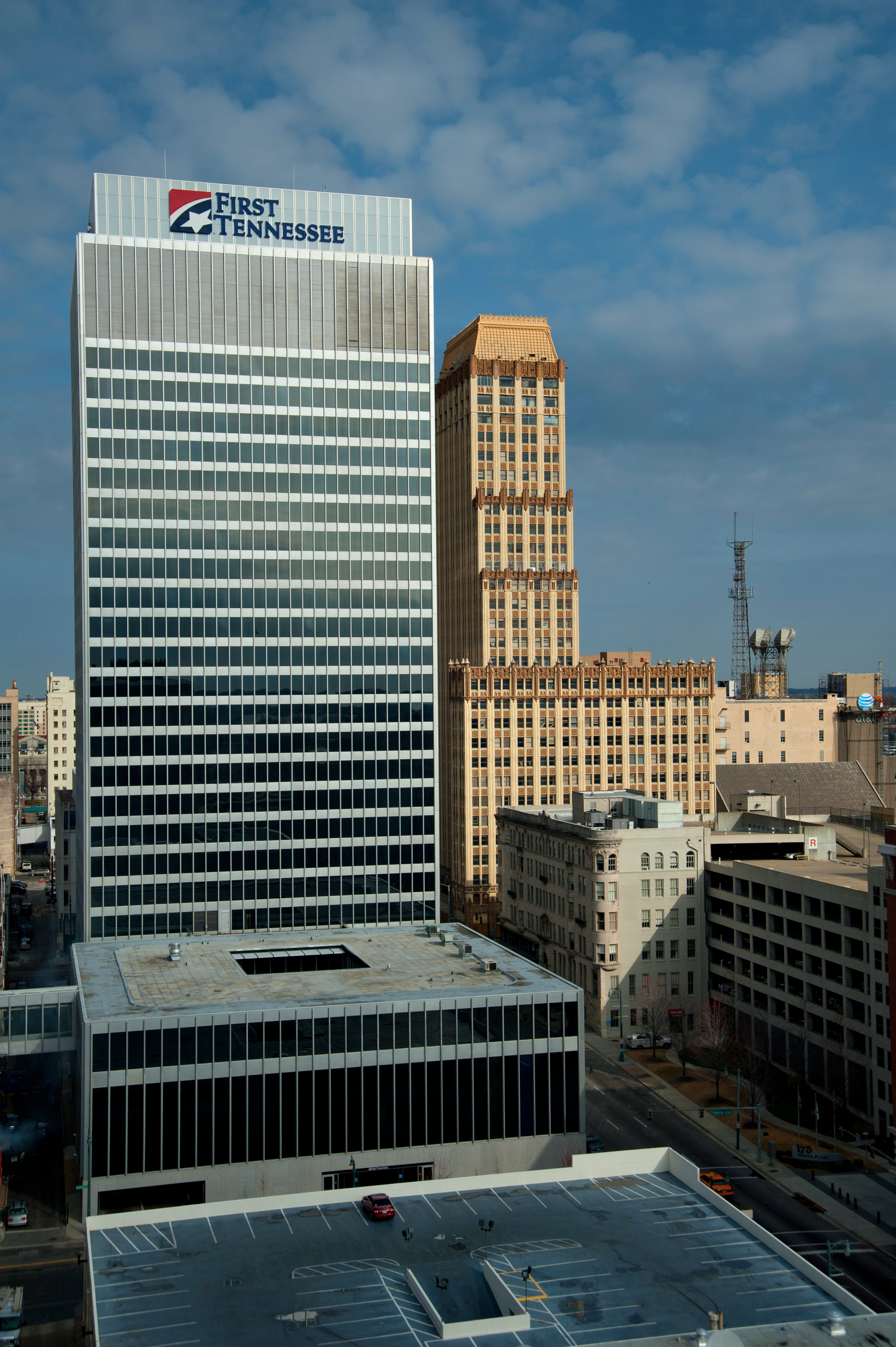
- Interactive map of the First Horizon Bank Tower area
- Former names: First Tennessee bank Building

General information
- Status: Completed
- Type: Office
- Architectural style: International style
- Location: 165 Madison Avenue, Memphis, Tennessee 38103
- Coordinates: 35.1443°N 90.0508°W 90° 3' 3.186" W
- Construction started: May 16, 1962
- Completed: 1964

Height
- Height: 332 ft (101 m)

Technical details
- Floor count: 25

Design and construction
- Architect: Walk C. Jones Jr.
- Structural engineer: Gardner & Howe
- Main contractor: J.A. Jones Construction

Other information
- Public transit: MATA; Main Street; Madison Avenue

The First Horizon Bank Tower (formerly First National Bank Building and First Tennessee Bank Building) is a high-rise office building in Memphis, Tennessee.

The building's namesake is its main tenant First Horizon Bank. It is currently the seventh tallest building in the city. Light panels adorn the sides of the building, which are used to illuminate various images on the side of the building at night.

== History ==
The site was originally occupied by the Goodwyn Institute, an institutional office building completed in 1927. Construction of the building began in 1961 and was completed in 1964. Its formal ribbon-cutting ceremony occurred on March 22, 1964, and former state senator Lewis Taliaferro making the first transaction at the building.
