= 100 North Main =

Tallest building in Memphis, Tennessee

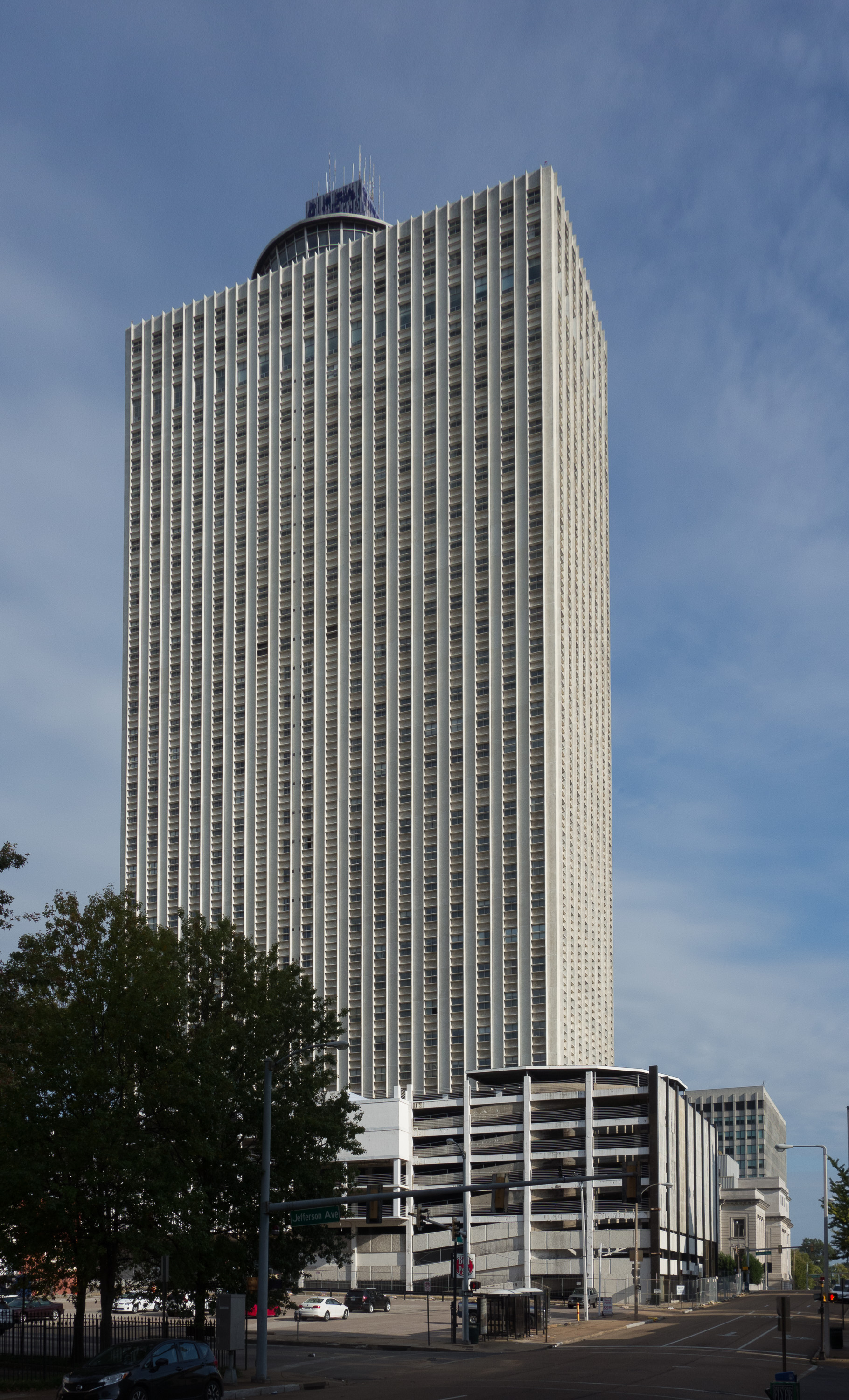
- 100 North Main in 2016

General information
- Architectural style: International style
- Location: 100 North Main Street; Memphis, Tennessee
- Completed: 1965

Height
- Roof: 430 ft (130 m)

Technical details
- Floor count: 37
- Floor area: 436,272 square feet (40,500 m^{2})

Design and construction
- Architect: Robert Lee Hall
- Main contractor: Southern Builders, Inc of Tennessee

Other information
- Public transit: MATA; Main Street Line
- One Hundred North Main Building
- U.S. National Register of Historic Places
- NRHP reference No.: 15000187
- Added to NRHP: April 24, 2015

100 North Main is the tallest building in Memphis, Tennessee. At 430 feet, (131m) it has 37 floors and stands bordering Adams Avenue, North Second Street, and North Main Street. The building is currently totally vacant and closed to public entry. Plans for renovation to convert the building to hotel and apartments have repeatedly stalled. The building has been condemned by Shelby County Environmental Court since late 2015 when it was discovered that chunks of concrete were falling from the building's exterior walls, as well as the elevators being inoperable and the fire safety systems not being up to code or functional. It was listed on the National Register of Historic Places in 2015.

== History ==
In 2006, the aging office tower was priced for sale at US$20 million. Due to limited demand for commercial office space in downtown Memphis, much office space began to decline in value. In January 2012, only 30% of the building was occupied.

In February 2014, the building's new owners revealed plans to convert the building into apartments and a hotel at a cost of almost $100 million. Construction began in June 2014, after all remaining tenants vacated the building.

The building stands abandoned and fenced off as of May 2016. The building has been condemned by Shelby County Environmental Court since late 2015 when it was discovered that chunks of concrete were falling from the building's exterior walls, as well as the elevators being inoperable and the fire safety systems not being up to code or functional.

On January 8, 2018, the current owner of 100 North Main, New York-based Townhouse Management Co., made public plans to convert the building into a 550-room Loews Hotel with 220 apartment units. The developer also planned to build a new, 34 story office tower on an adjacent property.

On March 9, 2021, the Downtown Memphis Commission purchased 100 North Main from Townhouse Management Co. for $12 million. As a part of the agreement, all lawsuits against Townhouse regarding the building were dropped.

In late 2023, renovations of 100 North Main began after a $216 million investment. The plan is to have parking, retail, and office space on lower floors. It also had a hotel and apartments on the upper floors with a spinning restaurant at the top of the building. The first phase, construction, started in 2024 and is expected to be finished in 2026.

As of late 2025, the developer has completed cleaning and interior demolition at 100 North Main and construction is halted as interior designs are being finished.

== Design features ==
In their 1986 book Memphis: An Architectural Guide, authors Eugene J. Johnson and Robert D. Russell, Jr. called 100 North Main "one of the least interesting" downtown structures.

== See also ==
- List of tallest buildings in Memphis
- National Register of Historic Places listings in Shelby County, Tennessee

Preceded by Sterick Building	Tallest Building in Memphis; 1965 - Present; 131m	Succeeded by -
