= South Main Street Historic District (Memphis, Tennessee) =

Coordinates: 35.135323°N 90.058352°W

- South Street Historic District
- U.S. National Register of Historic Places
- U.S. Historic district
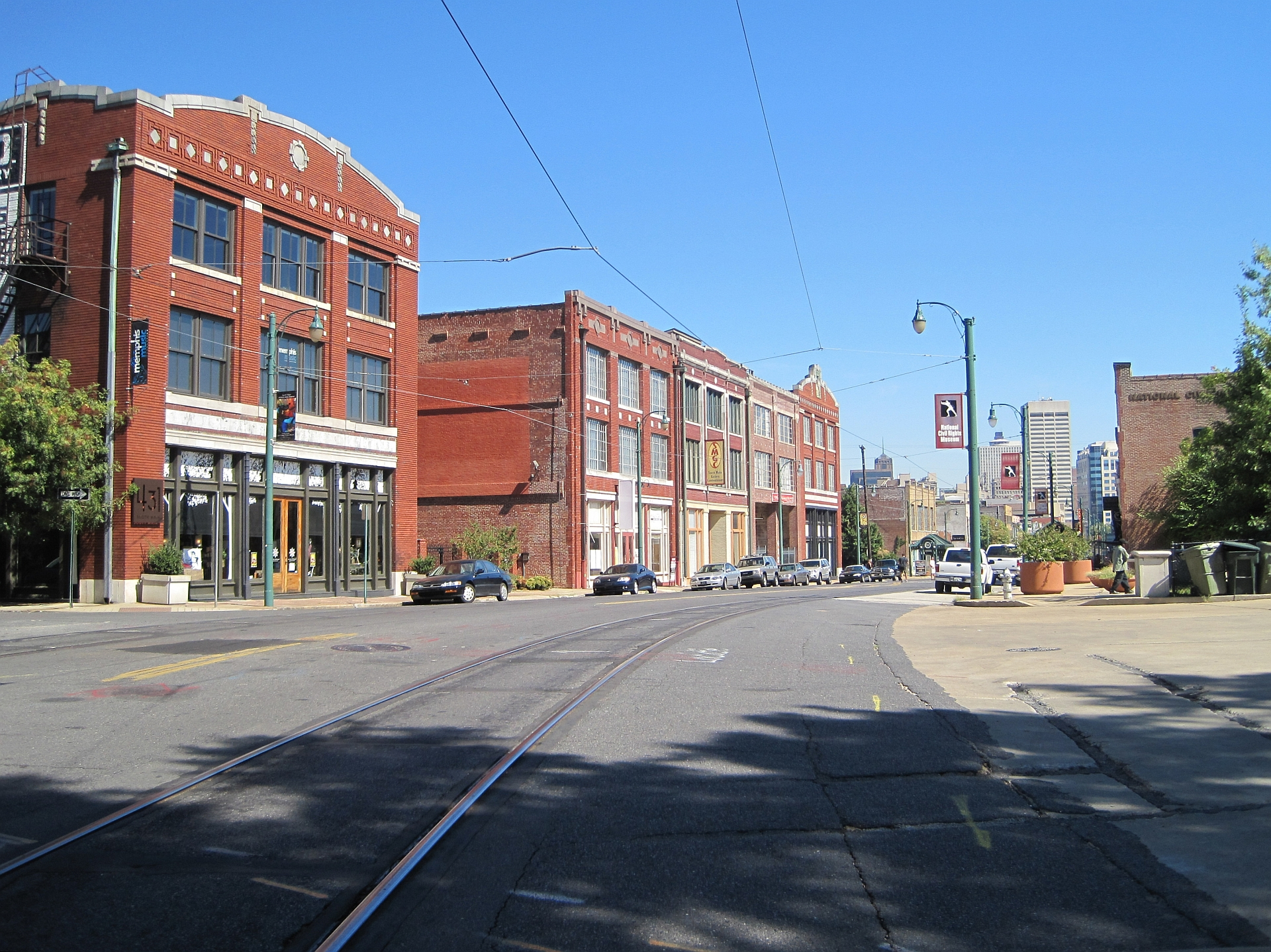
- South Main, looking north from Longshot, in 2010

- Location within Tennessee Location within the United States
- Location: Roughly S. Main St. between Webster and Dr. Martin Luther King Junior Avenues, and Mulberry between Calhoun and Vance Avenues, Memphis, Tennessee
- Area: 20 acres (8.1 ha)
- Architect: Multiple
- NRHP reference No.: 82004054 (original); 97000224 (increase 1); 99000756 (increase 2); 13000503 (increase 3)

Significant dates
- Added to NRHP: September 2, 1982
- Boundary increases: March 8, 1997; July 9, 1998; August 13, 2013

The South Main Street Historic District in Memphis, Tennessee, United States, is located south of the city's central business district encompassing over 100 mostly commercial buildings spread across 11 blocks. The area was constructed between 1900 and 1930 in a wide range of early-twentieth-century architectural styles including Beaux Arts, Georgian Revival, Art Deco and Chicago Commercial. The district was added to the National Register of Historic Places in 1982 as an area of Memphis representing the impact of the railroad on the city during the a period of railroad-led prosperity that ended with the Great Depression. The district includes the Lorraine Motel, constructed in 1925, where Martin Luther King Jr. was assassinated in 1968. The South Main Arts District is a smaller area within the historic district. The district is also a City of Memphis local historic district or Historic Overlay District.

== Rail expansion ==
The first station in the district was on Calhoun Street, built c. 1855 by the Mississippi and Tennessee Railroad. It was replaced by a newer Calhoun Street Station that was demolished when Memphis Central Station (originally Grand Central Station) was built on the same site in 1912–1914 by the Illinois Central Railroad and a subsidiary, the Yazoo & Mississippi Valley Railroad that ran south to New Orleans, Louisiana. This station was a main anchor of the rail business in Memphis, especially for north–south traffic, along with Memphis Union Station, built a few blocks away on Calhoun Street in 1910–1912 by other railroads primarily as a hub for east–west traffic.

== Original district ==
When added to the register in 1982, the district contained 105 structures and a few vacant lots. Of these, only six were considered to be "non-contributing" with either little or no "historic or architectural significance", or significantly altered from their original appearance or otherwise out of character with the district.

The district includes South Main Street between Linden and Webster; and Mulberry Street, which parallels Main, between Vance and Butler. There are also buildings fronting Butler, Calhoun, Huling, Pontotoc, and Vance near their intersections with Main and Mulberry. Most buildings are one to three stories, with a few taller. Almost all buildings in the district are contributing properties and they are primarily masonry buildings, constructed of either brick, terra-cotta, or cast stone. Most buildings on South Main Street were built right at the sidewalk, the only grass in the district is at the fire station which was set back farther from the street and at one hotel.

The most prominent building in the district is Memphis Central Station, which opened in 1916 and is not the only remaining passenger station in the city. Many of the other buildings in the district were built to serve railroad travelers. They included hotels, restaurants, bars, and similar places. Also located in the district were businesses that made heavy items and which were shipped by rail and located there to reduce transportation costs. The area had previously been a "fashionable residential area of Memphis", but most residences were replaced with commercial buildings. A few large houses survived as hotels.

== Increases ==
An increase in 1997 added the 1914 Railway Express Agency Building at 663 S. Main St as significant to the history of rail-related transportation in Memphis and a good example of a freight-handling business.

An increase in 1999 added 384 Mulberry and 129 Talbot, two identical buildings built as examples of African-American tenement housing in Memphis, both built c. 1905.

A third increase occurred in 2013 when 124–125, 136–137, 148, 153, 154, 158, and 161 G.E. Patterson Ave., and 138 St. Paul Ave. were added to the district as additional good examples of freight-handling businesses significant to the rail history of Memphis.

== Redevelopment ==
The area, which declined with the rail industry after World War II, gained national notoriety after King's assassination at the Lorraine Motel. It has more recently become trendy with restaurants, bars, and shops operating in the historic buildings. In 2017, developers announced a plan to convert Memphis Central Station, a service stop for Amtrak's City of New Orleans route and the MATA Trolley system, into "a hotel like none other". The station's old powerhouse building was converted into a seven-screen theater in 2019. Memphis has also approved tax breaks to spur other development in the area.

The National Civil Rights Museum, originally the Lorraine Motel, opened in 1991. The Orpheum Theatre, located on South Main just a block outside the district, is also individually listed on the National Register of Historic Places.
