= Memphis Central Station =

Railway station in Memphis, Tennessee

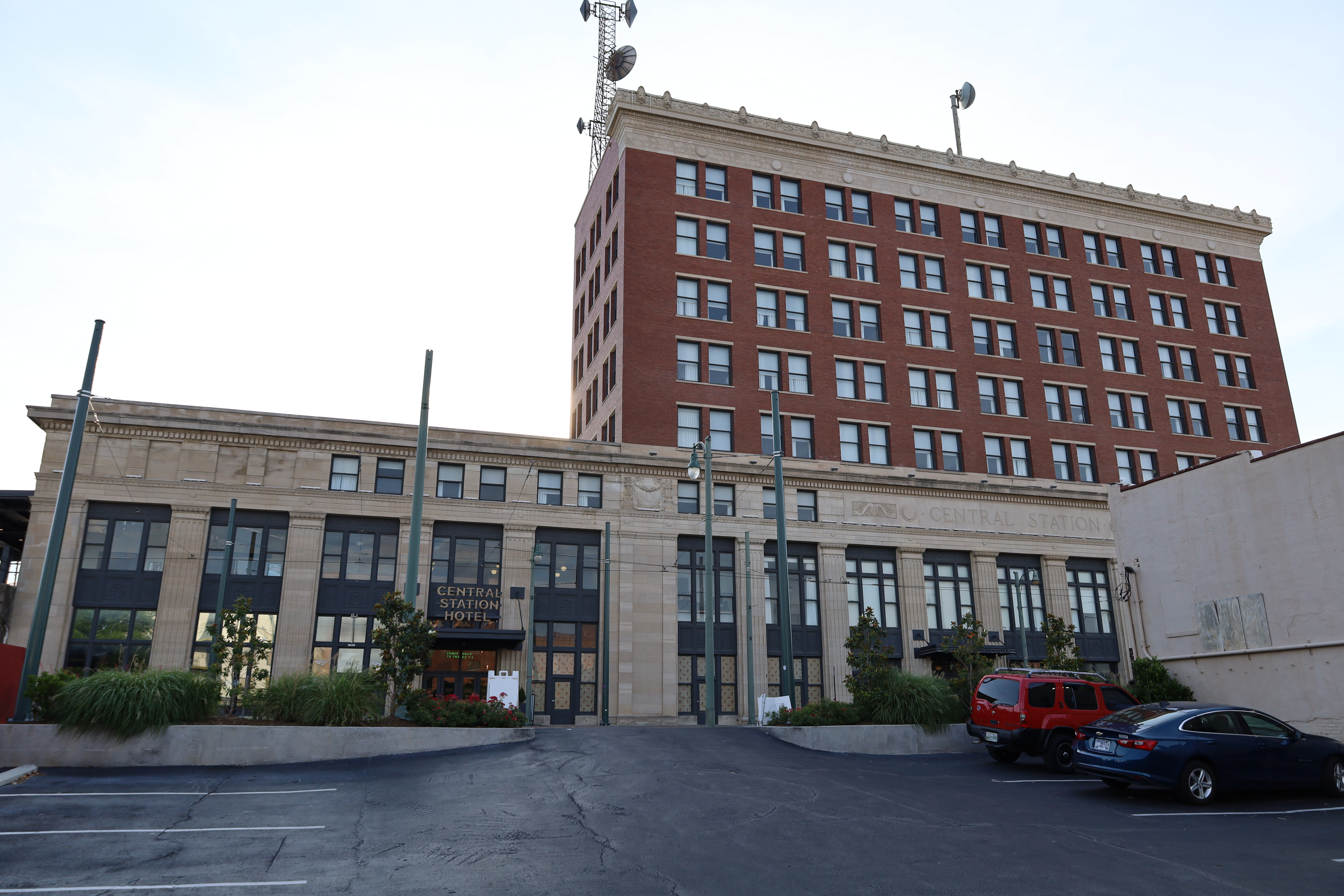
- The station in 2022

General information
- Location: 545 S. Main Street; Memphis, Tennessee; United States
- Coordinates: 35.1323°N 90.0594°W
- Owner: Memphis Area Transit Authority
- Line: Illinois Central (CN)
- Platforms: 1 side platform (formerly more)
- Tracks: 2 (formerly 10)
- Connections: MATA Trolley: Main Street Line, Riverfront Loop; MATA bus: Route 12

Construction
- Parking: Yes
- Cycle facilities: Yes
- Accessible: Yes

Other information
- Station code: Amtrak: MEM

History
- Opened: 1914; 112 years ago
- Rebuilt: 1999; 27 years ago

Passengers
- FY 2025: 65,941 (Amtrak)

Services
Preceding station	Amtrak	Following station
Marks toward New Orleans	City of New Orleans	Newbern toward Chicago
Former services
Preceding station	Amtrak	Following station
Batesville before 1995 toward New Orleans	City of New Orleans	Newbern toward Chicago
Preceding station	Illinois Central Railroad	Following station
Hernando toward New Orleans	Main Line	Woodstock toward Chicago
Terminus	Memphis – Louisville	Woodstock toward Louisville
Walls toward New Orleans	Yazoo and Mississippi Valley Railroad Main Line	Terminus
Terminus	Memphis – Greenwood	Walls toward Greenwood
Preceding station	Chicago, Rock Island and Pacific Railroad	Following station
Hulbert toward Tucumcari	Tucumcari – Memphis	Terminus
Preceding station	St. Louis–San Francisco Railway	Following station
Terminus	Memphis – St. Louis	Turrell toward St. Louis
Marion toward Kansas City	Kansas City – Birmingham	College Park toward Birmingham
- Memphis Central Station
- U.S. Historic district – Contributing property
- Part of: South Main Street Historic District (ID82004054)
- Designated CP: September 2, 1982
Location

Memphis Central Station, referred to as Grand Central Station prior to 1944, is a passenger terminal in Memphis, Tennessee. Located along Main Street and G.E. Patterson Boulevard in Downtown Memphis, it currently a service stop for Amtrak's City of New Orleans route, arriving in late evening northbound and in the morning southbound. It is also served by the MATA Trolley system. The building was opened in 1914, and is located within the city's South Main Arts District. It is also a contributing property to the South Main Street Historic District of the National Register of Historic Places, as are the National Civil Rights Museum and other historic properties within the district boundaries.

== History ==
=== Early history ===
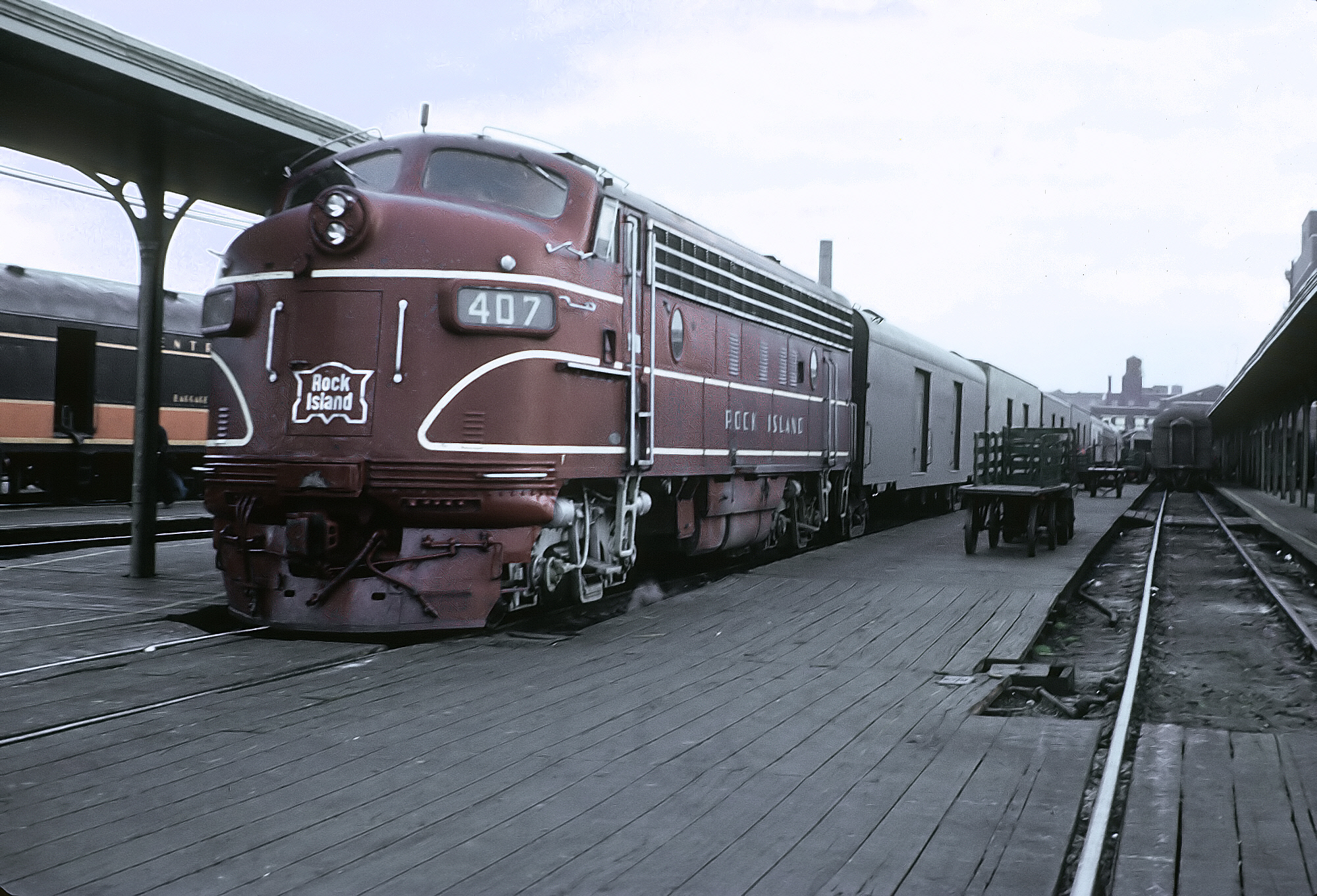
Train 22, the Rock Island's Cherokee from Tucumcari waiting at Memphis Central Station on April 16, 1962

Central Station was built on the site of a former station known as Calhoun Street Station. Both stations were owned by the Illinois Central Railroad or its predecessors. Construction of Memphis Central Station began in September 1912, and the station was opened for service on October 4, 1914. The track design included five stub-end tracks (station tracks 1–5), and five through tracks (station tracks 6–10).

The station was also used by Yazoo and Mississippi Valley Railroad, St. Louis-San Francisco Railway, (also known as the Frisco) and Chicago, Rock Island and Pacific Railway (also known as Rock Island Railroad). Between April 1, 1964, and November 30, 1966, the Louisville and Nashville Railroad was also a tenant, during the time that Memphis Union Station was closed.

Lavender v. Kurn, 327 U.S. 645 (1946) was a case decided by the Supreme Court of the United States dealing with a negligent wrongful death case brought by the estate of an Illinois Central employee, a switchtender at Broadway Crossing. In December 1939, the switchtender had lined Frisco train #106 to back into Central Station. After the train passed, the switchtender was found fatally injured, although the cause could not with certainty be determined to be accidental from being hit by a RPO mail hook or being murdered by a hobo in the area. The relatives of the switchtender sued for negligence under the Federal Employers Liability Act and the Supreme Court upheld the claim.

=== Decline and renovation ===
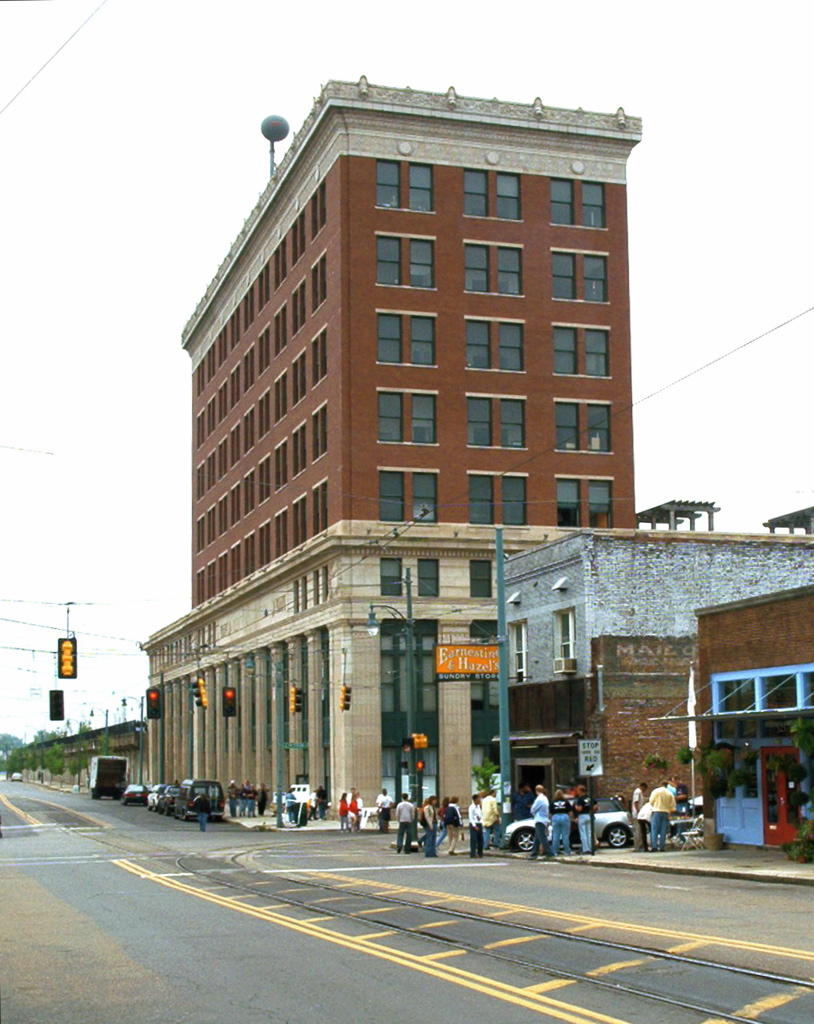
Side view of the station in 2002

Like other large stations across America, the rapid decline of the passenger train network after World War II made Memphis Central Station an aging, nearly deserted monument to an earlier era. Rock Island passenger train service to Memphis ended in November 1967, and Frisco train service ended a month later, leaving Illinois Central as the sole occupant of the station. With the permanent closure of Union Station in 1968, Central Station became the sole intercity station in Memphis.

On May 1, 1971, Amtrak took over nearly all passenger trains in the United States. Amtrak cut back service to a single train, the City of New Orleans, and large sections of Central Station were closed off and abandoned. Illinois Central offices were moved from the station, and it appeared that the station would eventually be razed, facing the same fate as Union Station.

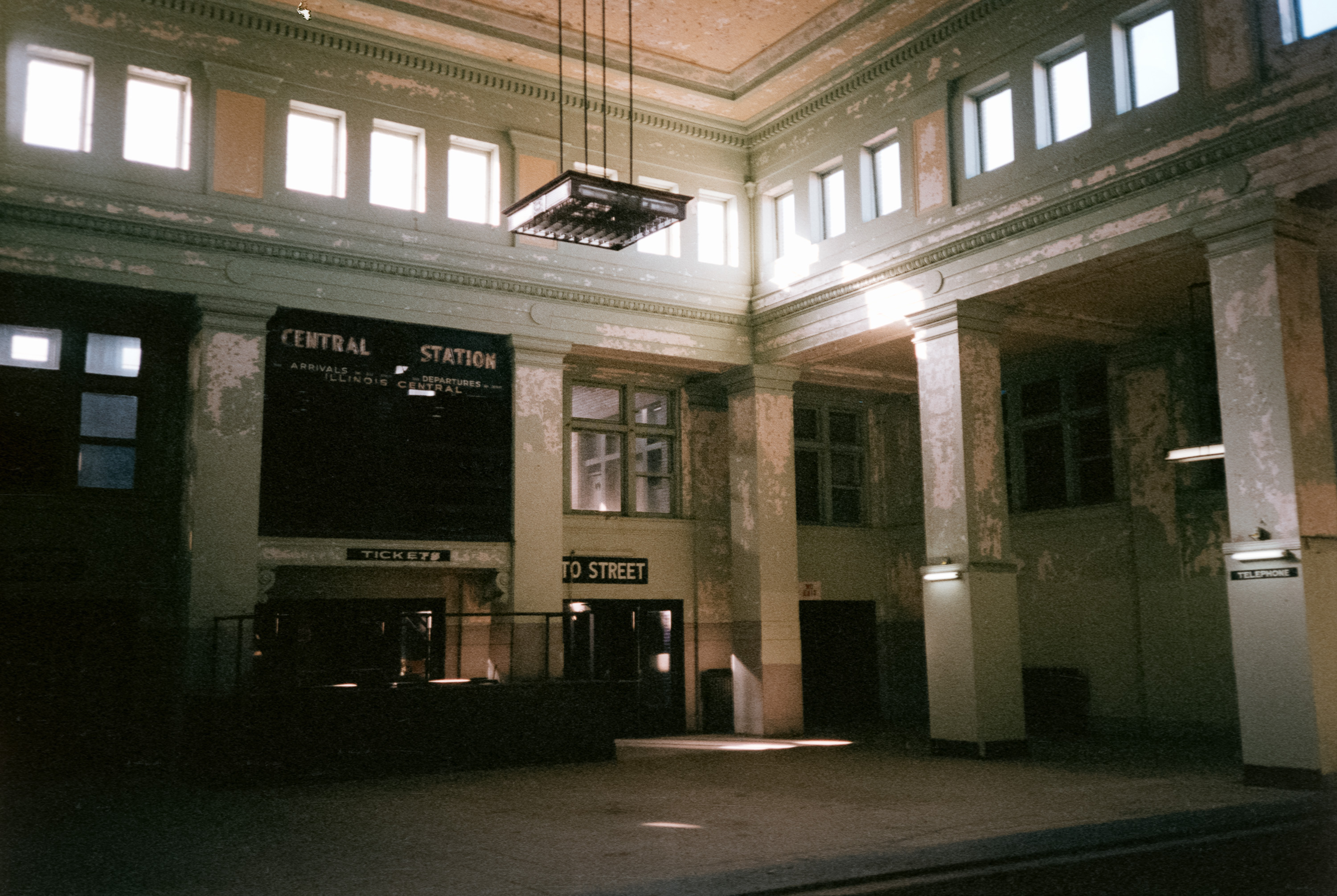
Memphis Central Station interior, December 1995

The station's upkeep deteriorated to an extent that for much of time from the 1970s to the mid-1990s, it had a reputation as one of the worst stations on the Amtrak system. In 1998 the property was acquired by Memphis Area Transit Authority, which undertook a $23.2 million renovation project. Much of the former waiting area would become a public meeting area, the Illinois Central office space on upper floors was converted to condominiums, and Amtrak retained a smaller presence in the former midway area of the station. The station renovation, which was completed in November 1999, helped to speed the renovation and redevelopment of this once deserted area of downtown Memphis.

=== Role during Hurricane Gustav (2008) evacuations ===
In anticipation of the landfall of Hurricane Gustav, the city of New Orleans began evacuating residents without the means to leave the city, starting on August 30, 2008. One thousand twenty-four evacuees arrived in Memphis via Amtrak.

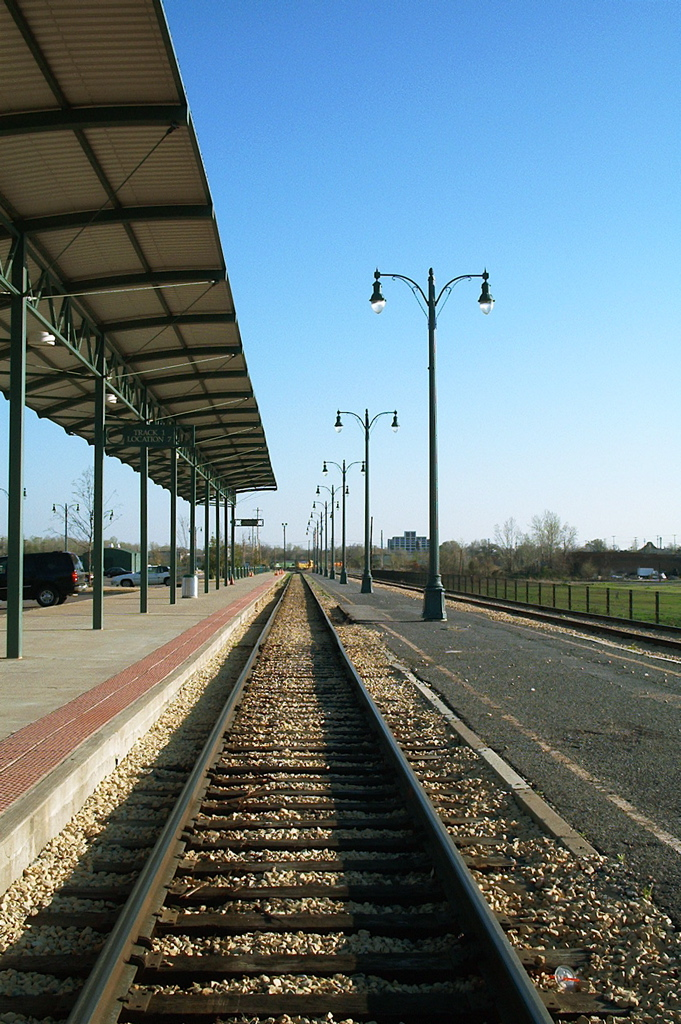
Today the station has just a single platform

=== Today ===
In 2019 the station underwent a major $55 million remodel that included a new Amtrak ticket office and waiting area. A new luxury hotel was opened in the station: Central Station Hotel, Curio by Hilton. The hotel includes a refurbished ballroom, two restaurants and a bar. The MATA Trolley Main Street Line heritage streetcar was extended to Central Station in 2021.

In 2026 it was announced that Central Station was sold to a group of investors who will add a high-end steakhouse, a private members club, a coffee shop, and retail shops to the property. Investors include Staley Cates, Kevin McEniry, Bill Rhodes and Henry Turley.

The station continues to be served by the City of New Orleans, which has called here since the train's inception in 1949. It previously served the train's nighttime counterpart, the famed Panama Limited.

Presently, this is one of only two Amtrak stations in Tennessee, the other being the Newbern Depot. It is the only Amtrak station in the state with full service; Newbern is a flag stop.

== Named trains serving Memphis Central Station ==
A partial list of named trains in the pre-Amtrak period that served Central Station:

- Chicago, Rock Island and Pacific Railway (Rock Island)
  - Choctaw Rocket
  - Cherokee
  - Hot Springs Special
  - Memphis Californian
  - Southwest Express
- Illinois Central Railroad
  - Panama Limited
  - City of New Orleans
  - Delta Express
  - Irvin S. Cobb
  - Louisiane
  - Northern Express/Southern Express
- Louisville and Nashville Railroad (since 1964)
  - Pan-American
- Southern Railway (since 1964)
  - Tennessean
- St. Louis-San Francisco Railway (Frisco)
  - Memphian
  - Kansas City-Florida Special
  - Sunnyland
- Yazoo and Mississippi Valley Railroad (in latter years, absorbed into Illinois Central)
  - Delta Express
  - Planter

== See also ==
- Union Station (Memphis)
