= South Main Arts District, Memphis =

Area of Memphis, Tennessee, United States

South Main Arts District
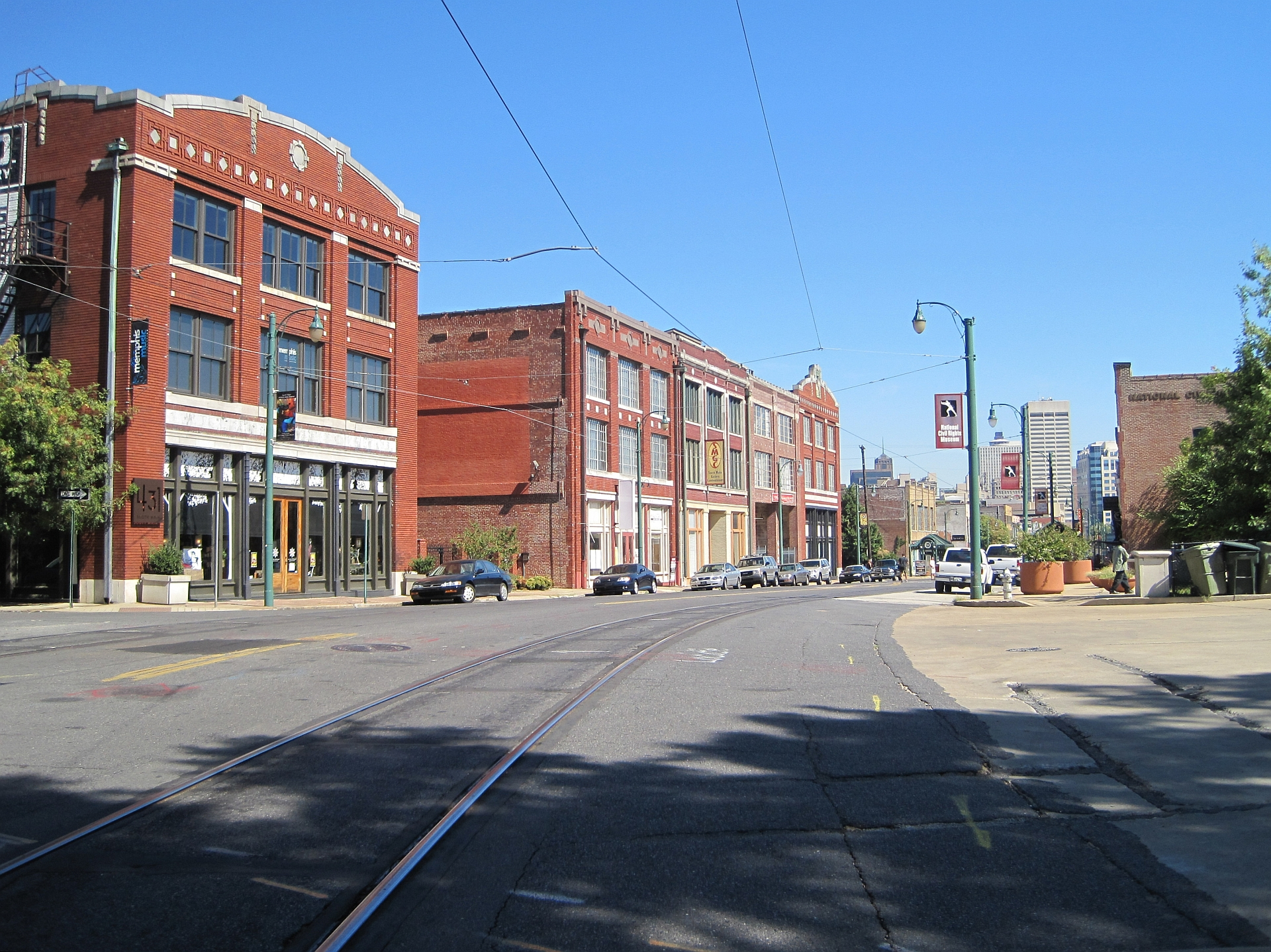
- South Main Street (2010)
- Location: South Main St. between Beale Street and G.E. Patterson, Memphis, Tennessee
- Coordinates: 35°8′1.24″N 90°3′32.24″W

The South Main Arts District in Memphis, Tennessee makes up the southern portion of Downtown Memphis. It is located along South Main Street and is within the South Main Street Historic District.

== Attractions ==
=== Points of historical interest ===
Many great points of historical interest in Memphis reside in this area. One is the National Civil Rights Museum. The others include the Blues Hall of Fame and the historic restaurant the Arcade, located on the south corner of South Main and G.E. Patterson. It is the oldest coffee shop and one of the oldest family owned restaurants in Memphis. Elvis used to hang out at the Arcade and it has become a favorite among filmmakers; several movies have had scenes filmed at the diner-styled restaurant.

=== Art Trolley tour ===
On the last Friday of each month, an event called "Trolley Night" is put on by the South Main Association, as well as owners of the South Main businesses and art galleries. From 6-9 pm, this includes free MATA trolley service up and down Main Street, open art galleries, and longer hours for most area shops and restaurants.

=== Locations and buildings ===
Several notable locations and buildings are located in the South Main district.

- National Civil Rights Museum
- Central Station

== Films ==
The South Main district has been featured in many films, sometimes as just background scenery in Memphis, sometimes masquerading as an older version of Beale Street.

Some of the films featuring scenes from the South Main district are:

- The Firm — Tom Cruise and the FBI meet at The Arcade Restaurant.
- 21 Grams
- Hustle & Flow
- Walk the Line — The scenes shown on "Beale Street" are actually South Main, somewhat dressed up and slightly CGI enhanced.
- Black Snake Moan — While most of the movie was shot in the Pyramid, several scenes were shot on South Main as well.
- My Blueberry Nights — Filmed inside Ernestine and Hazel's and the Arcade Restaurant, as well as several exterior shots along South Main and G.E. Patterson.
- Nothing But the Truth — Scenes were shot at the Arcade Restaurant (which is transformed via green screen special effects into a Washington eatery).
- Mystery Train — Not only shot in Memphis, but the front entrance of the Arcade Restaurant is depicted on the movie poster.
- Great Balls of Fire
- Elizabethtown — Scenes shown in the National Civil Rights Museum, Ernestine and Hazel's, and the Arcade Restaurant.
- Lovely By Surprise — Scene filmed in the Arcade Restaurant.
- The Client

== See also ==
- National Register of Historic Places listings in Shelby County, Tennessee
