= Maxine Smith =

American academic and civil rights activist (1929–2013)

- Born: October 31, 1929; Memphis, Tennessee, United States
- Died: April 26, 2013 (aged 83)
- Burial place: Elmwood Cemetery, Memphis
- Education: Spelman College, Middlebury College
- Occupations: Academic, school board official
- Organization: National Association for the Advancement of Colored People
- Known for: American Civil Rights Movement
- Spouse(s): Vasco A. Smith, Jr.
- Children: One

Maxine (Atkins) Smith (October 31, 1929 — April 26, 2013) born in Memphis, Tennessee, United States, was an academic, civil rights activist, and school board official.

Smith's leadership in the National Association for the Advancement of Colored People (NAACP), and her involvement with educational planning at both the local and state levels in Tennessee, enabled her to support the American Civil Rights Movement and advance school desegregation.

== Personal life and education ==
Smith was the youngest of three children of Joseph and Georgia Rounds Atkins. In 1945, at age 15, Smith graduated Booker T. Washington High School in Memphis. She earned a bachelor's degree in biology from Spelman College in Atlanta in 1949, and a master's degree in French from Middlebury College in Vermont.

In 1955 she married Vasco A. Smith Jr., a dentist, civil rights leader, and the first black county commissioner in Memphis. Smith gave birth to a son in 1956.

== Career and civil rights involvement ==
Smith became assistant professor of French at Prairie View A&M University in Prairie View, Texas, and then at Florida A&M University in Tallahassee, Florida. Smith then taught briefly at LeMoyne-Owen College in Memphis, Tennessee.

In 1957, Smith applied to pursue graduate studies at the University of Memphis, but was denied admission because she was black. This led Smith to become involved with the Memphis Branch of the NAACP. In 1962, Smith was named Executive Secretary of the branch, and continued in that role until her retirement in 1995.

In 1960, Smith assisted in desegregating Memphis public schools, and in 1961 Smith personally escorted the first 13 black children to their new desegregated schools. Through her leadership with the Memphis NAACP, Smith advocated for civil rights by organizing sit-ins, marches, lawsuits, voter registration drives, and student boycotts such as the "If You're Black, Take It Back" campaign to boycott downtown stores which had segregated water fountains and work forces.

In 1968, Smith served on the coordinating committee of the Memphis sanitation strike, an event which brought Martin Luther King Jr. to the city, where he was assassinated on April 4.

In 1971, Smith was the first African-American elected to the Memphis Board of Education, a position she held until her retirement in 1995. Smith advocated for the promotion of school principal W. W. Herenton to the role of school superintendent in 1978, the first African-American to hold that position in Memphis. Smith later supported Herenton's successful bid to become mayor of Memphis.

In 1991, Smith was elected president of the Memphis Board of Education, a role she served for two terms, retiring in 1995. In 1994, Tennessee Governor Ned McWherter appointed Smith to the Tennessee Board of Regents, the governing body for many public colleges and universities throughout the state.

== Honors and recognition ==
Smith was presented with a Freedom Award by the National Civil Rights Museum in 2003, and awarded a Doctor of Humane Letters by her alma mater, Spelman College, in 2004.

Smith was featured in the 2008 documentary about the Civil Rights Movement, The Witness: From the Balcony of Room 306.

Smith was featured in documentary "The Memphis 13".

== Death ==
Smith had a number of health issues, and underwent heart surgery in 2012. She died April 26, 2013, at age 83, and was buried at Elmwood Cemetery in Memphis. Congressman Steve Cohen commented:

Maxine Smith was the Mother of the Civil Rights Movement in Memphis, having served on the National Board of the NAACP and as the Executive Secretary of the Memphis Branch of the NAACP where she coordinated the desegregation of everything in Memphis from schools to lunch counters to theater seating, and libraries, as well as public accommodations and facilities. Maxine Smith was an unstoppable force during the Civil Rights Movement, not only in Memphis but across America.
