= Memphis Street Railway Company =

Streetcar line in Memphis, Tennessee

Overview
- Locale: Memphis, Tennessee
- Dates of operation: 1895–1961
- Successor: Memphis Transit Authority

The Memphis Street Railway Company (MSR) was a privately-owned operator of streetcars and trolleybuses in Memphis, Tennessee on roughly 160 route miles of overhead electrified cable and rails between 1895 and 1960. The longest of the rail lines reached from downtown to Memphis National Cemetery near Raleigh.

== History ==
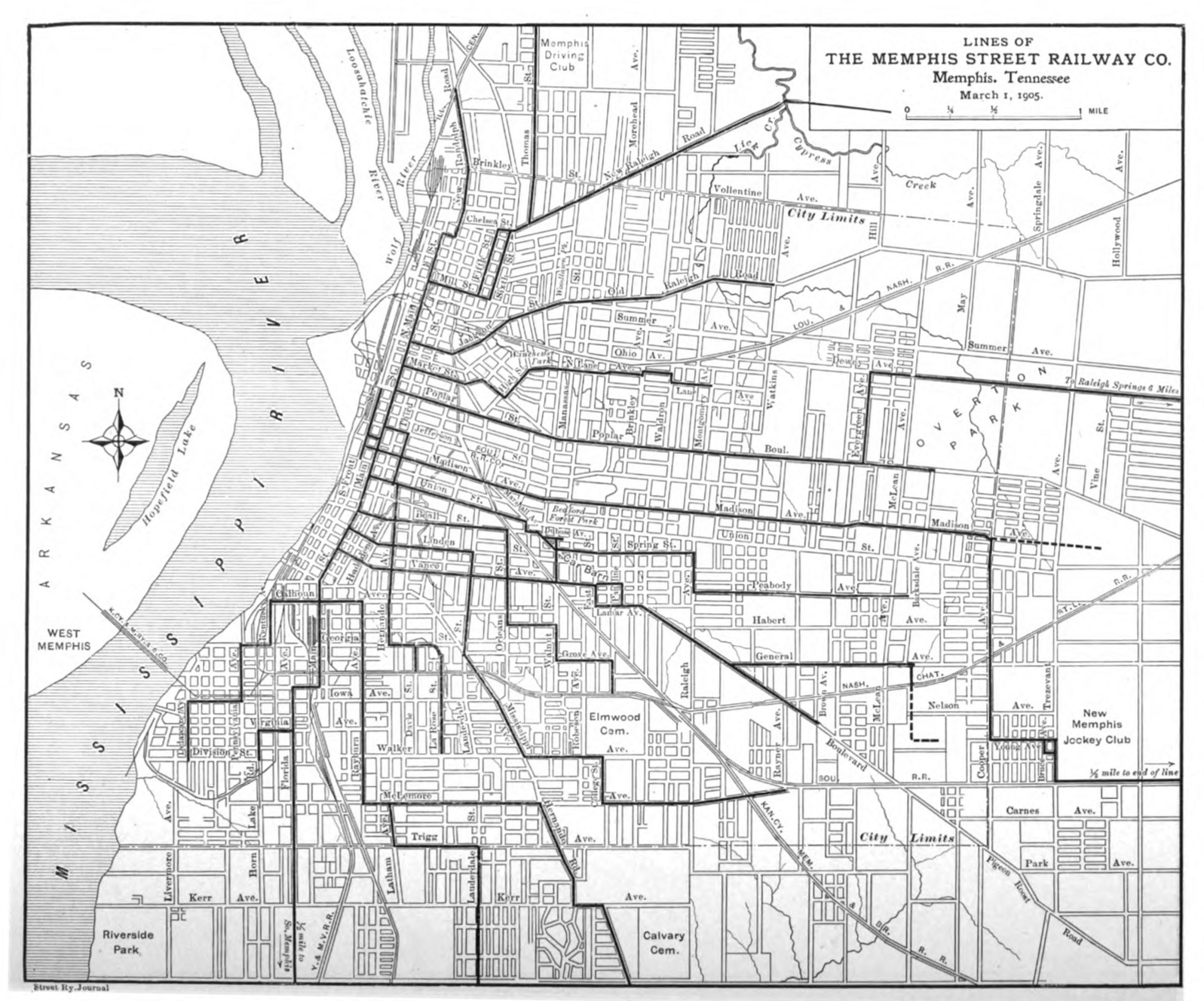
Map of Memphis Street Railway system in 1905

The Memphis Street Railway was created in March 1895 through the merger of several smaller systems including the Memphis & Raleigh Springs Railroad, East End Street Railway, Citizens Street Railroad and City & Suburban Railway. In 1890, when The Citizens Street Railroad of Memphis, Tenn. suffered a financial setback, Mr. Albert Merritt Billings of Chicago bought the company for over $2,000,000. Billings electrified the system, and the company became a great success. Billings recruited Frank G. Jones from Iowa to operate the company as vice-president. At its peak the interurban operated nearly 77 miles of trackage, 51 of which was double-track.

Memphis Street Railway started operating their first trolleybus route on November 8, 1931. The electric buses replaced the Lamar streetcar line. Streetcars remained in use until 1947 when trolleybuses were phased in fully.

In April 1958, Memphis Street Railway rebranded itself as Memphis Transit Company. Trolleybuses were discontinued in use for diesel buses by 1960. In 1961, the City of Memphis Transit Authority, which later became the Memphis Area Transit Authority, purchased Memphis Transit Company and became publicly owned.

=== Today ===
The formerly major intersection at Main St and Madison Ave of the Main St and Fair Grounds lines was returned to service as a part of MATA’s Main Street and Madison Avenue trolleys.

== Service ==
Memphis, then only 44 square miles (smaller than San Francisco), could be traversed easily with frequent service to within blocks of any corner in the city. Fares included a free transfer.

== Lines ==
1 Normal
2 Fair Grounds
3 Raleigh-Macon Road
6 Lamar [trolleybus]
7 Crosstown
8 Elmwood
9 Glenview
11 Wellington
12 Florida
14 Second-Desoto Park
15 Jackson
16 Lane-Faxon
17 Forest-Hill
19 Walker Av
