= Newbern Depot =

Railway station in Newbern, Tennessee

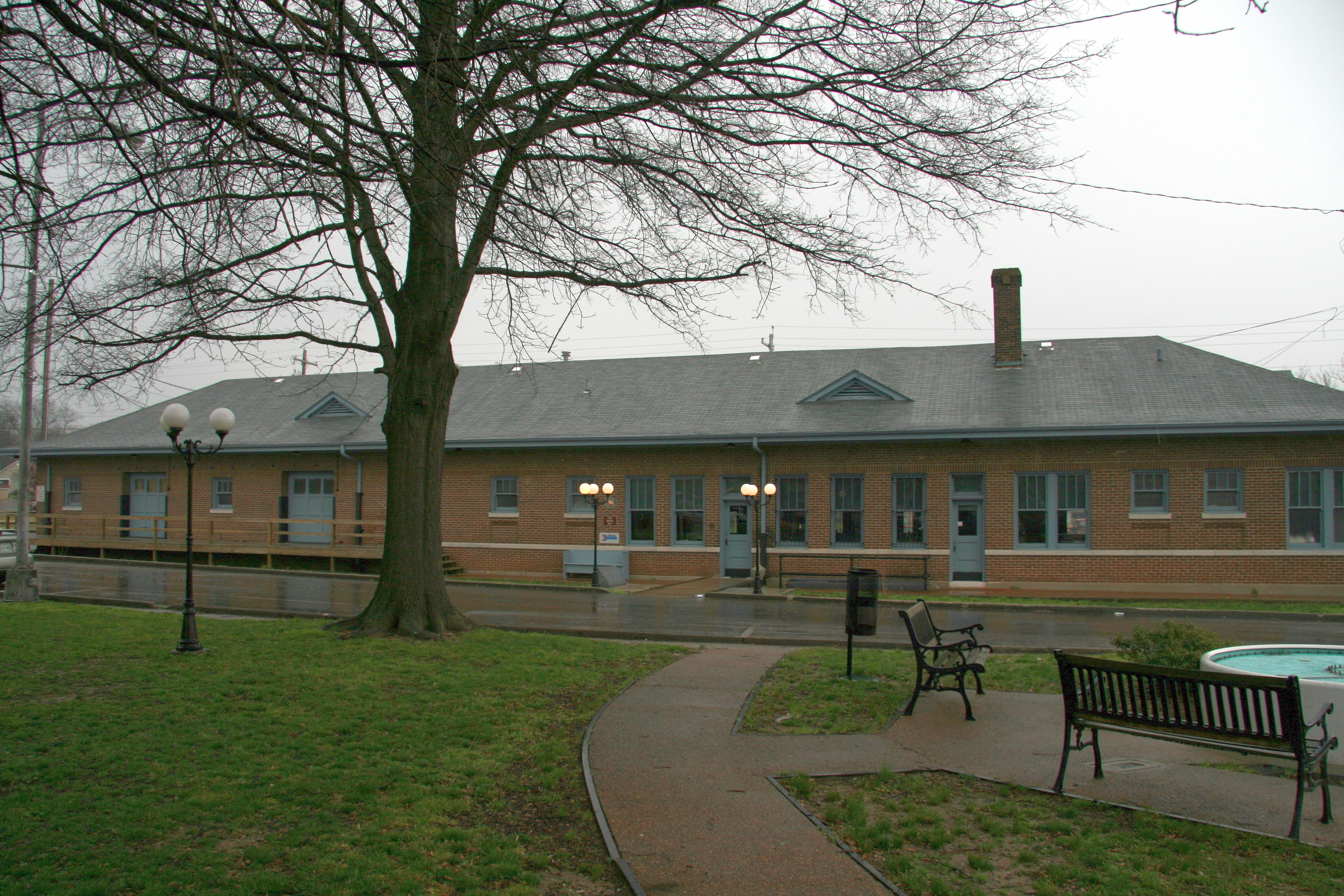

General information
- Location: 108 Jefferson Street; Newbern, Tennessee; United States
- Coordinates: 36.1125°N 89.2625°W
- Line: Illinois Central (CN)
- Platforms: 1 side platform
- Tracks: 1

Other information
- Status: Flag stop; unstaffed
- Station code: Amtrak: NBN

Passengers
- FY 2025: 4,008 (Amtrak)

Services
Preceding station	Amtrak	Following station
Memphis toward New Orleans	City of New Orleans	Fulton toward Chicago
Former services
Preceding station	Illinois Central Railroad	Following station
Dyersburg toward New Orleans	Main Line	Templeton toward Chicago
Dyersburg toward Memphis	Memphis – Louisville	Trimble toward Louisville
- Newbern Illinois Central Depot
- U.S. National Register of Historic Places
- Location: Jct. of Main and Jefferson Sts., Newbern, Tennessee
- Coordinates: 36°6′44″N 89°15′44″W
- Area: 1.5 acres (0.6 ha)
- Built: 1920
- Built by: Illinois Central Railroad
- Architectural style: Combination Depot, American Craftsman
- NRHP reference No.: 93000213
- Added to NRHP: March 25, 1993
Location

Newbern Depot, also known as Newbern Illinois Central Depot or as the Newbern–Dyersburg station, is an Amtrak station and museum in Newbern, Tennessee. It is an unstaffed flag stop on the City of New Orleans route, which serves Newbern and nearby Dyersburg when passengers have tickets to and from the station. The building was constructed by Illinois Central Railroad in 1920 and was added to the National Register of Historic Places in 1993.

== History ==
The depot was built in 1920 by the Illinois Central Railroad. The third station erected at Newbern, it replaced a wooden building that burned in 1918. The new brick facility was a combination depot that accommodated both passenger and freight services in a single one-story building, along with a railroad business office. It was built to a standard floor plan with little architectural ornamentation, but the windows and eaves show Craftsman influences. Adjacent to the depot building is a cotton-loading platform where bales of cotton were taken off wagons and transferred to railcars during the era when Newbern was a center for the cotton ginning and shipment of cotton grown in surrounding counties.

Illinois Central Railroad ceased passenger train service to the depot in 1965. The building was then used for storage until 1990, when it was acquired by the city of Newbern to create the Newbern Depot and Railroad Museum. To pay for a restoration, the town held a fundraising event, "Depot Days", which has become an annual celebration in the town. It was subsequently restored based on the original architectural drawings, and was added to the National Register of Historic Places on March 25, 1993, as Newbern Illinois Central Depot. In 1992, Amtrak service was moved from the small stop in nearby Dyersburg to the restored Newbern Depot in order to serve both towns; it is thus sometimes called the Newbern-Dyersburg station. Amtrak's City of New Orleans train comes through twice a day; the depot is a flag stop, meaning passengers can get on or off the train, but there is no staffed ticketing or baggage service.

Amtrak completed a $3.5 million accessibility project at the station, including a 350-foot (110 m)-long platform, in May 2024.

== Newbern Depot Museum ==
The museum exhibits old photos, railroad tools, uniforms, schedules, and other memorabilia, along with model trains and artwork commemorating the town's railroading past.
