= The Witness: From the Balcony of Room 306 =

- Directed by: Adam Pertofsky
- Produced by: Margaret Hyde
- Production company: Rock Paper Scissors
- Distributed by: National Civil Rights Museum; HBO
- Release date: 2008
- Running time: 32 minutes
- Country: United States
- Language: English

The Witness: From the Balcony of Room 306 is a 2008 American short documentary film created to honor the 40th annual remembrance of the life and death of Martin Luther King Jr. Directed by Adam Pertofsky, the film received a 2008 Oscar nomination in the "Best Documentary Short Subject" Category at the 81st Academy Awards.

== Description ==
Directed by filmmaker Adam Pertofsky and produced by Margaret Hyde, the 32-minute film describes the weeks and days leading up to King's return in 1968 to assist sanitation workers striking in Memphis, Tennessee. On April 4, as he stood on the balcony of the Lorraine Motel outside of Room 306 greeting visitors below, King was assassinated by a gunman. With an intimate portrayal provided by Samuel "Billy" Kyles who himself was on the balcony only a few feet away when the fatal shot was fired, the film is an introduction to the legacy of King as revealed in conversations and personal aspirations shared with Kyles and others who played a key role in the Civil Rights Movement during that pivotal era of U.S. history.

Although numerous films have been made on Martin Luther King and the Civil Rights Movement, Witness looks at King's work from the perspective of a friend and one of the last surviving eyewitnesses (Rev. Kyles). The film contributes original personal interviews along with a local perspective. Shot on-location in Memphis at several historic sites, it highlights King's efforts to improve physical safety and financial conditions of the sanitation workers in the city where he ultimately met his untimely death.

In addition to Kyles, others interviewed for the film include Benjamin Hooks, Civil Rights Leader and former Executive Director of the NAACP, Maxine Smith, previous Executive Secretary for the NAACP Memphis Branch, and Taylor Rodgers, one of the original sanitation workers who participated in the strike for better working conditions and had marched alongside King and Kyles.

"The Witness" is a regular feature at the National Civil Rights Museum that is situated at the Lorraine Motel in Memphis, Tennessee, where a wreath marks the location of the balcony outside of Room 306 where King was standing when he was shot and period automobiles adorn the parking lot below.

== Production ==
Filming began in February 2008, with an April 1, 2008 deadline for completion in time for the 40th memorial of King's death. It was done on location at the Lorraine Motel and at several other historic sites in Memphis including the National Civil Rights Museum and Mason Temple Church of God in Christ. About the project, director Adam Pertosfsky said, "I've always had a passion for Dr. King's teachings and the Civil Rights Movement, so when Margaret Hyde, the producer, approached me about doing this film, I was ecstatic. I felt it was a very important piece of history that needed to be documented."

Regarding the effort that took the film from inception to screening in seven months, Executive Producer Margaret Hyde said, "Everyone, especially Rev. Kyles, participated with the proviso that we didn't seek to personally benefit from the film and that all proceeds would go to the Museum. We knew we just couldn't think of making the film any other way. Everyone interviewed in the film donated his or her time and we were able to screen the film at the NCRM in time for the 40th anniversary of Dr. King's assassination commemoration."

Kyles, reflecting on why he was present on that balcony that day and how it became clear only much later: "He was there to help keep alive King's legacy and his dream of equal rights for African-Americans. 'Crucifixions have to have witnesses,' says Kyles. 'You can kill the dreamer but you cannot...kill the dream.'"

== Awards and Academy Awards nomination ==
The film received positive critical acclaim and received an Oscar nomination at the 2009 Academy Awards for "Best Documentary Short Subject". At the 2008 Palm Springs International ShortFest, it won the Audience "Favorite" Award for "Best Documentary" along with the Jury award for Best Documentary. It won in these categories at the Aspen Film Shortsfest 2009, and received "Best Documentary Short" at the 2009 Nashville Film Festival and at the Riverrun International Film Festival 2009. LA Times television critic Robert Lloyd described the film as "powerful".

== See also ==
- Civil rights movement in popular culture
