= National Civil Rights Museum =

Motel that was the site of the assassination of Martin Luther King Jr., now a museum

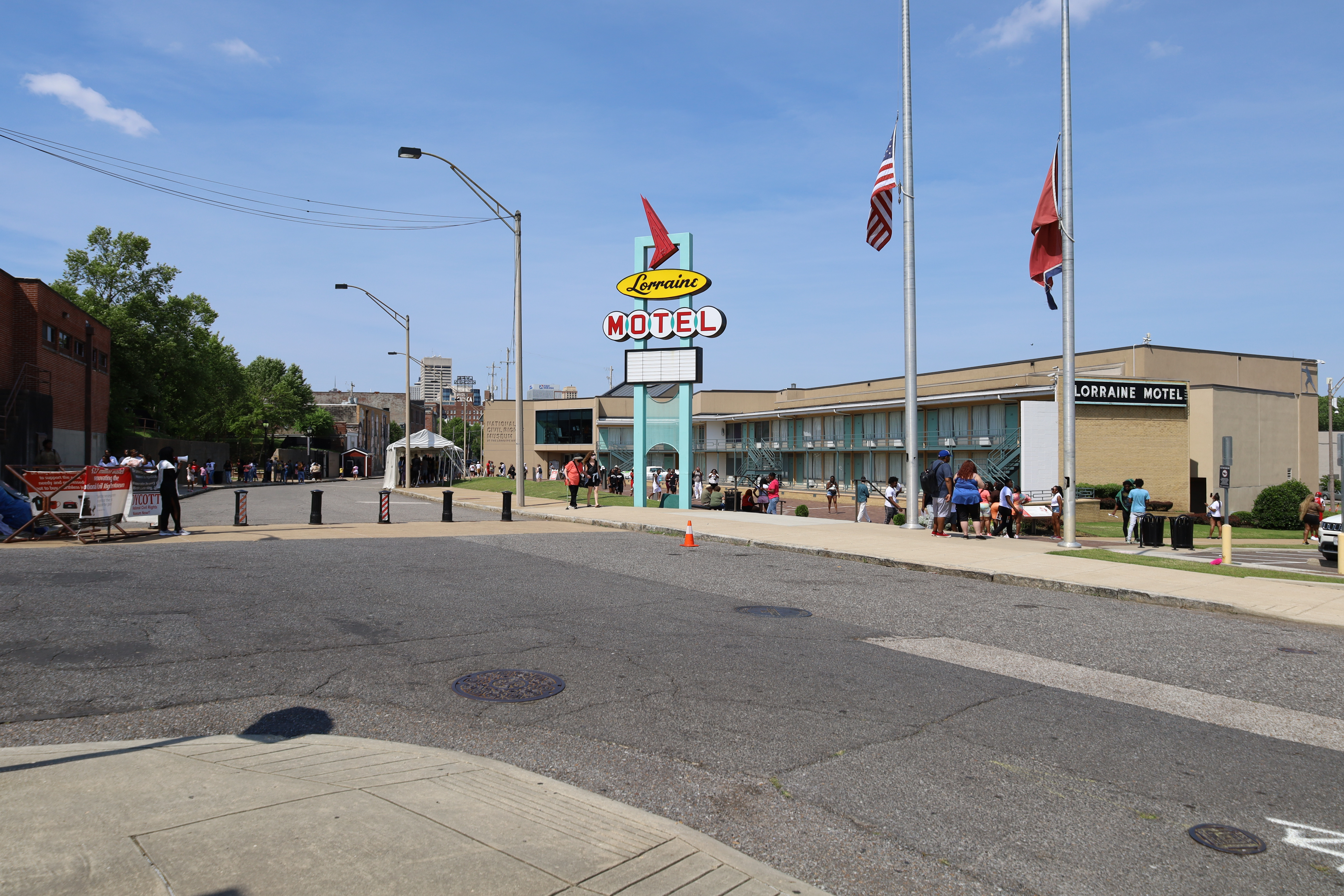
- View from southwest in 2022
- Established: September 28, 1991; 35 years ago
- Location: 450 Mulberry Street, Memphis, Tennessee, U.S.
- Coordinates: 35.1345°N 90.0576°W
- Type: Civil rights history museum
- President: Russ Wigginton
- Owner: Lorraine Civil Rights Museum Foundation
- Public transit access: Trolley: █ (Main Street Line)
- Website: civilrightsmuseum.org

U.S. National Register of Historic Places
- Type: Contributing property
- Designated: 1982
- Part of: South Main Street Historic District
- Reference no.: 82004054

The National Civil Rights Museum is a complex of museums and historic buildings in Memphis, Tennessee, United States; its exhibits trace the history of the civil rights movement in the United States from the 17th century to the present. The museum is built around the former Lorraine Motel, the site of the assassination of Martin Luther King Jr. in 1968. Two other buildings and their adjacent property, also connected with the King assassination, have been acquired as part of the museum complex.

After renovations, the museum reopened in 2014 with an increase in the amount of multimedia and interactive displays, as well as various short films to show highlights. The museum is owned and operated by the Lorraine Civil Rights Museum Foundation, based in Memphis. The Lorraine Motel is owned by the Tennessee State Museum and leased long term to the Foundation to operate as part of the museum complex. In 2016, the museum was honored by becoming an affiliate museum of the Smithsonian Institution. It is also a contributing property to the South Main Street Historic District of the National Register of Historic Places.

== Location and complex ==
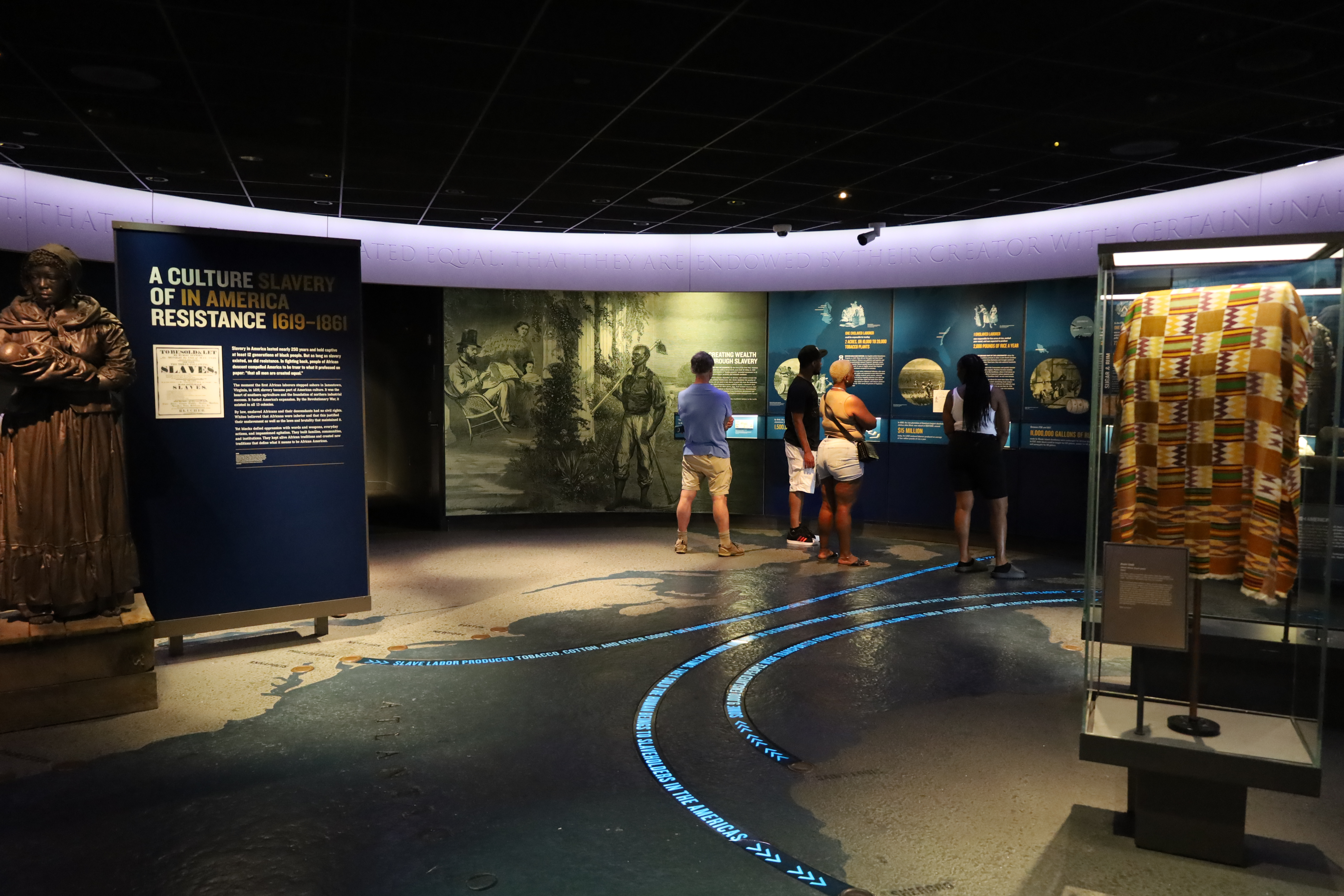
Museum exhibit

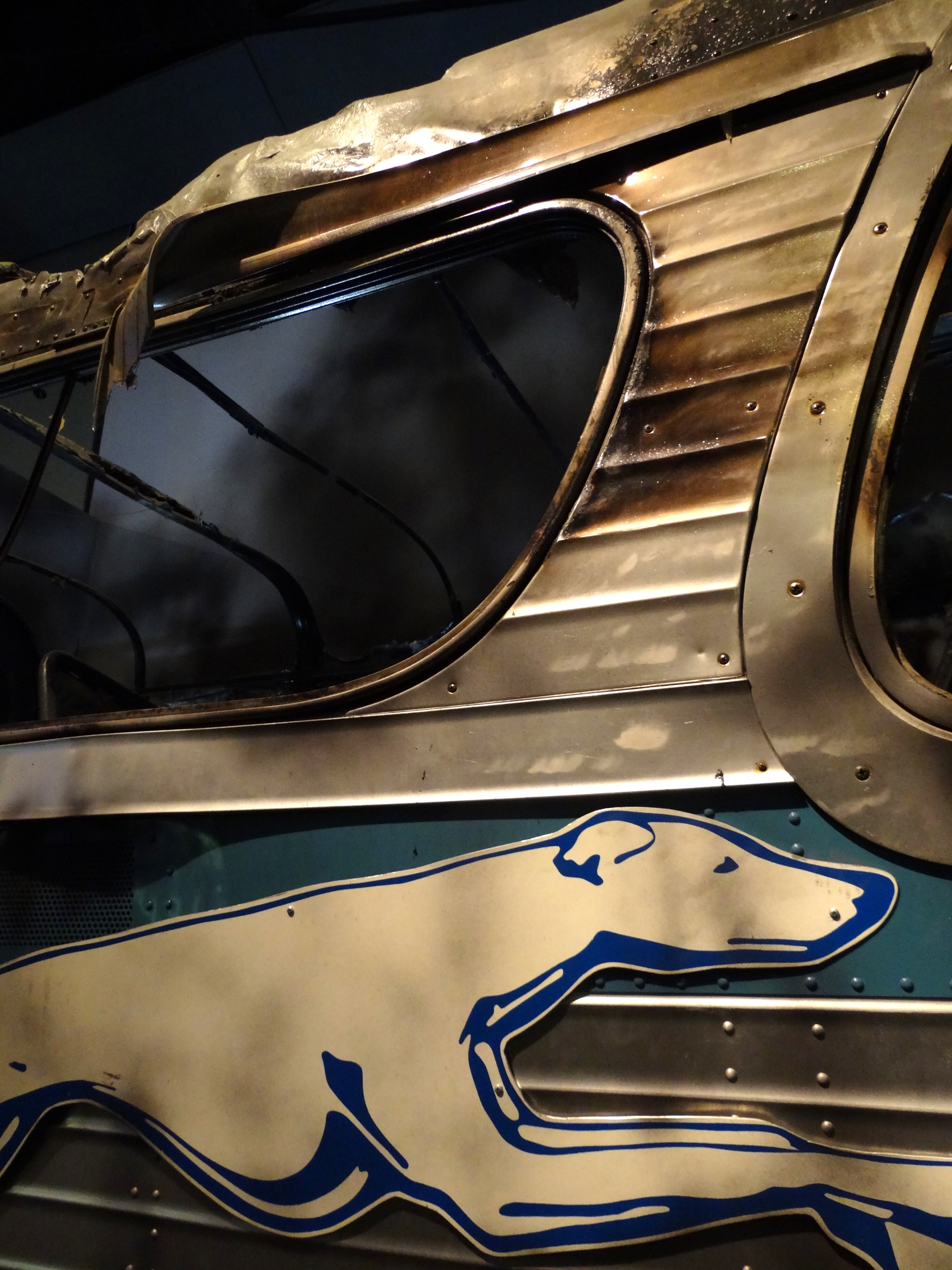
Replica of the Greyhound Bus destroyed by white supremacists during the Freedom Rides

The complex is located at 450 Mulberry Street, with all properties except the Lorraine Motel owned by the Lorraine Civil Rights Museum Foundation. The motel is owned by the state of Tennessee and operated by the foundation under a 20-year lease with the state museum in Nashville.

The main museum is located on the south edge of downtown Memphis, in what is now the South Main Arts District, about six blocks east of the Mississippi River. The main 4.14-acre (1.7 ha) site includes the museum, the Lorraine Motel, and associated buildings. The museum also owns the Young and Morrow Building at 422 Main Street, where James Earl Ray initially confessed (and later recanted) to shooting King. The complex includes Canipe's Amusement Store at 418 Main Street, next to the rooming house where the murder weapon with Ray's fingerprints was found. Included on these grounds is the brushy lot that stood between the rooming house and the motel.

The museum exhibits a number of vehicles of historic value or which are otherwise relevant to the time period. Vehicles on display include an International Harvester garbage truck in an exhibit on the 1968 Memphis sanitation strike that brought King to Memphis, James Earl Ray's 1966 white Ford Mustang, a 1968 Cadillac and 1959 Dodge parked outside the motel, a re-creation of the burned shell of a Greyhound bus used by Freedom Riders, and a bus representative of the Montgomery bus boycott.

== History ==
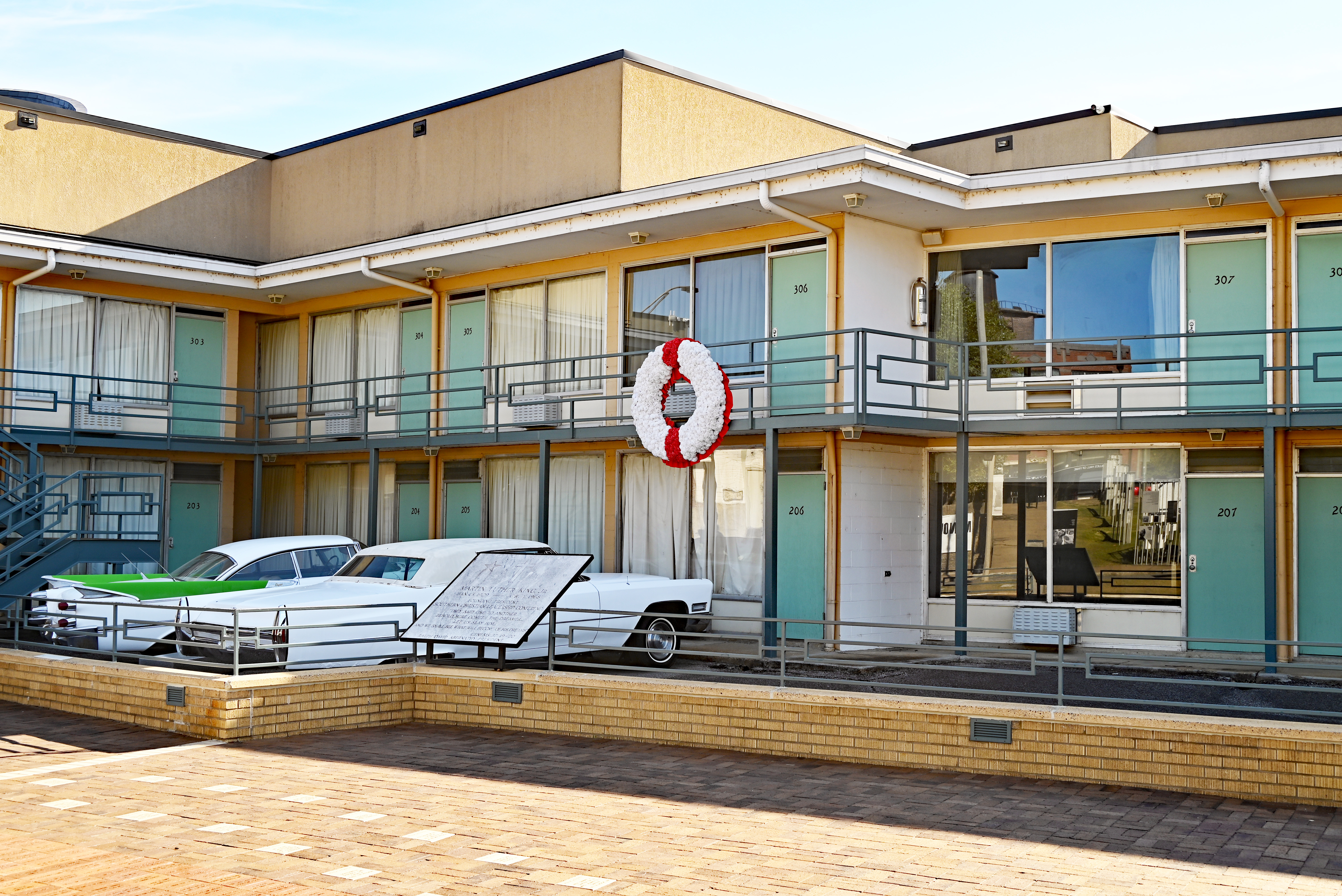
The Lorraine Motel is part of the complex of the National Civil Rights Museum. The wreath marks King's approximate place at the time of his assassination.

The site first opened as the 16-room Windsor Hotel in 1924, and was later known as the Marquette Hotel. In 1945, Walter Bailey purchased it and renamed it for his wife Loree and the song "Sweet Lorraine".

During the segregation era, Bailey operated the hotel as upscale lodging that catered to a black clientele. After the Civil Rights Act of 1964 banned segregated businesses, Bailey believed he needed to improve the facility to compete with other hotels that were no longer whites-only. He expanded the complex significantly later that year, adding a second floor, a swimming pool, and drive-up access for new rooms on the south side of the complex. Accordingly, he then changed the name from the Lorraine Hotel to the Lorraine Motel. Many musicians stayed at the motel in the 1960s while recording at Memphis' Stax Records, including Ray Charles, Lionel Hampton, Aretha Franklin, Ethel Waters, Otis Redding, the Staple Singers and Wilson Pickett.

=== Assassination of Martin Luther King Jr. ===
Civil rights movement leader Martin Luther King Jr. stayed in Room 306 of the Lorraine Motel in early April 1968, while working to organize protests around the ongoing Memphis sanitation strike. While standing on the balcony outside his room on the evening of April 4, King was suddenly shot once through the neck by an unseen assassin's sniper's bullet. King fell to the ground, bleeding from his head and neck. He was rushed to St. Joseph's Hospital, but the wound was fatal. He died at the hospital an hour after the shooting.

King was 39 years old. James Earl Ray, a 40-year-old resident of a rooming house across the street from the motel, was convicted of his murder in 1969. Ray pleaded guilty to the murder on his forty-first birthday, but later recanted his confession. The King family, alongside many others, have long believed that Ray was not the culprit and that the assassination was carried out by a group of conspirators, possibly including agents of the U.S. federal government. In the Loyd Jowers trial in 1999, a Memphis jury found Loyd Jowers, owner of a restaurant near the motel, liable for King's wrongful death.

Within days of the assassination, King's supporters began asking Bailey to build a permanent memorial at the Lorraine Motel, with one early suggestion being an eternal flame similar to the one at the grave of John F. Kennedy. On May 2, one of the caravans of marchers headed to participate in the Poor People's March on Washington started its journey at the motel. King's widow Coretta and Ralph Abernathy, his successor as president of the Southern Christian Leadership Conference, unveiled a memorial plaque at the motel shortly before the march started. In June, Room 306 was converted into a shrine to King's memory which was opened to the public. Touring the Dr. Martin Luther King Memorial Room was initially free, but later cost an admission fee of one dollar.

=== Establishing the memorial foundation ===
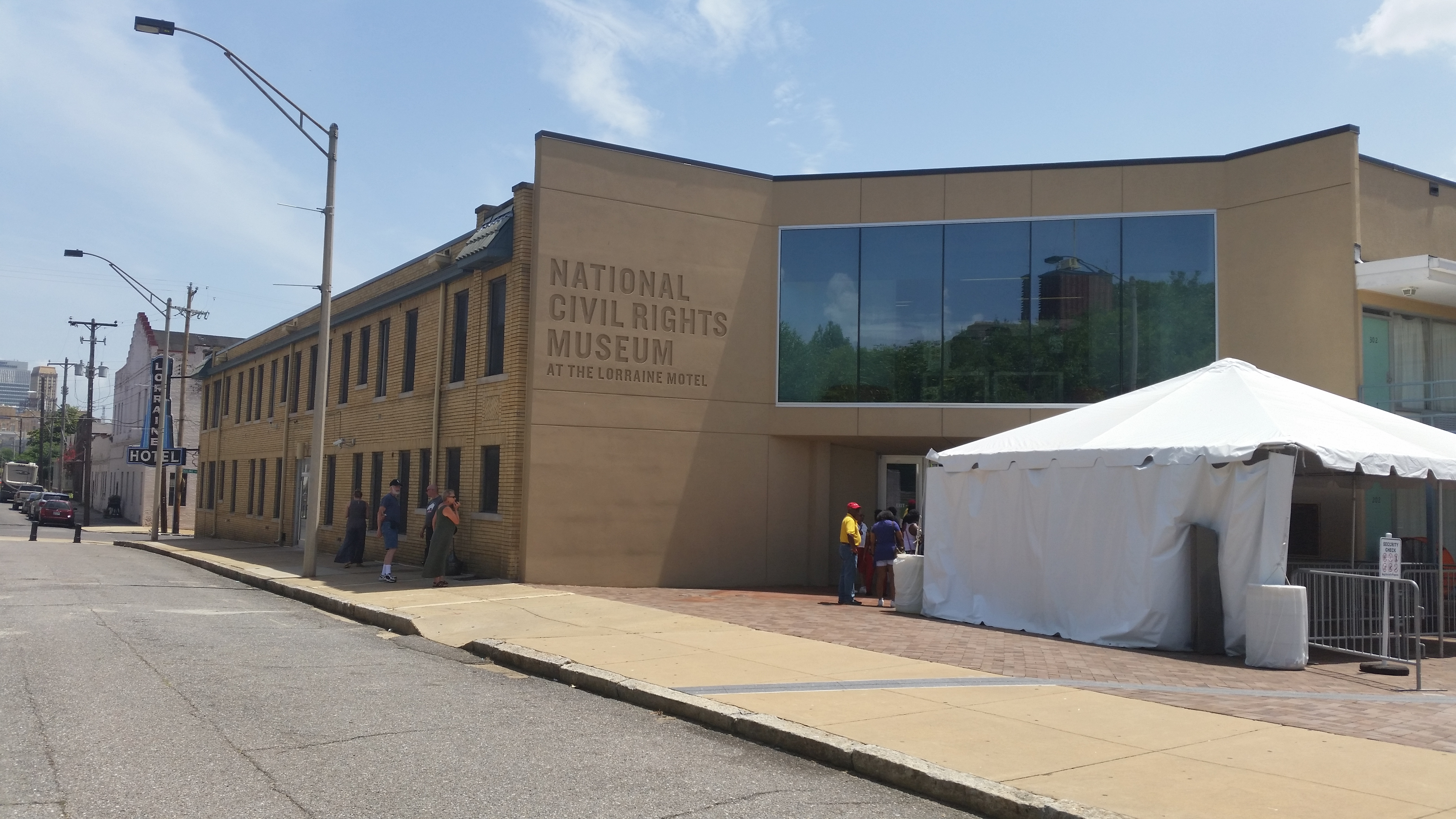
National Civil Rights Museum entrance

In the years following the assassination, business at the motel declined and Bailey ran into increasing debts, even as the assassination site became a frequent destination for sightseers. Approximately 15,000 people signed the motel's guestbook in 1980, while a report by the Shelby County Office of Planning and Development that year estimated that 70,000 people took commercial tours that stopped at the motel annually. Based on the findings of this report, the county considered purchasing the motel and turning it into a memorial or museum.

In April 1982, Bailey defaulted on a $140,000 construction loan, causing the lender to attempt foreclosure on the property. Bailey filed for bankruptcy a few days later, halting the foreclosure auction, and the news of the foreclosure provoked local business leaders to try to save the motel. The Martin Luther King Memphis Memorial Foundation, a newly established non-profit organization, agreed to purchase the motel from Bailey for $240,000, which it would need to raise from donors to finalize the sale. Later that year, the motel was added to the National Register of Historic Places, as part of the South Main Street Historic District.

The foundation held a series of fundraising events to purchase the motel property, including an exhibition basketball game at the Mid-South Coliseum that featured Magic Johnson, Isiah Thomas, George Gervin, and Marques Johnson. However, these efforts raised only $96,568 of the needed $240,000 in time for the set deadline of October 28, 1982, leading the motel to be placed back on the auction block. The foundation took out a $50,000 loan and was able to win the ensuing auction with its only bid of $144,000.

The group, which changed its name to the Lorraine Civil Rights Museum Foundation, stopped charging admission to tour Room 306 in March 1983. The foundation continued to operate the Lorraine as a single-room occupancy motel while seeking to raise funds to convert the building into a museum. However, it proved difficult to gather the millions of dollars needed for the construction. In May 1987, the foundation reached an agreement with the state of Tennessee, Shelby County, and the city of Memphis to develop the museum. The foundation agreed to sell the property to the state, which would provide $4.4 million in funding to build a museum that would be designed and controlled by the foundation, while the city and county would each provide another $2.2 million.

The motel closed to customers on January 10, 1988, when the state took possession of the property. Former owner Walter Bailey moved out of his residence in the motel that day after living there for over 40 years. Bailey died later that year.

=== Jacqueline Smith protest ===
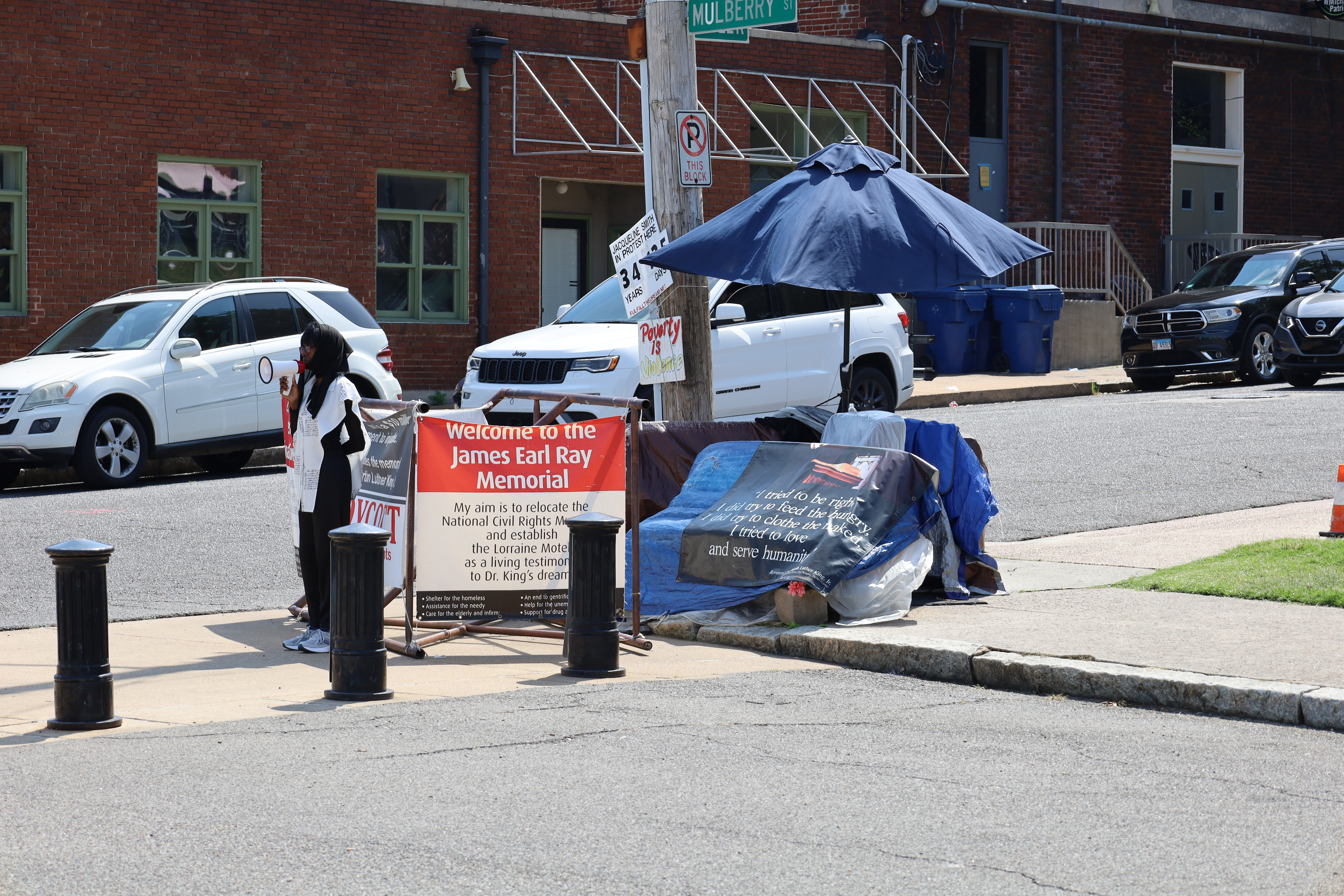
Jacqueline Smith protest vigil outside the Lorraine in 2022

When the motel closed, one of the remaining long-term tenants, Jacqueline Smith, refused to leave her room. Smith, who had lived at the motel since 1973 and had worked there as a housekeeper, protested the creation of the museum. Smith thought King would have objected to having millions of dollars spent on a memorial for him, evicting poor residents in the process, instead of policies and programs that would benefit the neighborhood community, which was generally lower-income and predominantly Black at the time. She saw the creation of the museum as part of a larger gentrification of the South Main Street area, pushing out poor residents as part of transforming it into the South Main Arts District.

For several weeks Smith continued to live inside the closed motel, which at the time was surrounded with an eight-foot-tall chain-link fence. On March 2, 1988, four sheriff's deputies forcibly carried her out of the building, while she shouted, "You people are making a mistake [...] If King were alive he wouldn't want this." Before the eviction, Smith had told reporters, "If I can't live at The Lorraine, I'll camp out on the sidewalk out front." After she was removed from the building and her belongings were dumped on the curb outside, she covered the items with a tarp and pitched a tent next to them.

Smith has lived outside the museum ever since, in a round-the-clock vigil that has lasted for more than 35 years. Her presence caused delays in the construction of the museum, as the construction work risked endangering her safety. As a result, she was ordered to leave her spot on the sidewalk outside the motel. On July 16, 1990, Smith was forcibly carried from that spot and dumped on the opposite side of the street.

Since her vigil began, Smith has spoken to thousands of museum visitors, including former president Jimmy Carter. Carter visited the museum site in December 1991 when his daughter Amy graduated from the Memphis College of Art, but did not enter the museum after listening to Smith's criticisms, which Amy agreed with. However, when Carter received an award in September 1994 for his humanitarian work in Haiti, he attended the award ceremony at the museum, leading Smith to feel that he had betrayed her. In addition to her criticism of the gentrification of the South Main neighborhood, Smith has also criticized the museum for its inherent focus on the moment of King's violent death, referring to it as the "James Earl Ray Memorial". In a 2018 column in the Memphis Commercial Appeal, Smith elaborated on her stance, saying, "Let's relocate the museum within Memphis, along with its Klan hoods, James Earl Ray rifle, and other negative memorabilia and turn the Lorraine into an establishment that Dr. King and Memphis can be rightly proud of and where visitors can experience his dream in action."

=== Museum opening in 1991 ===
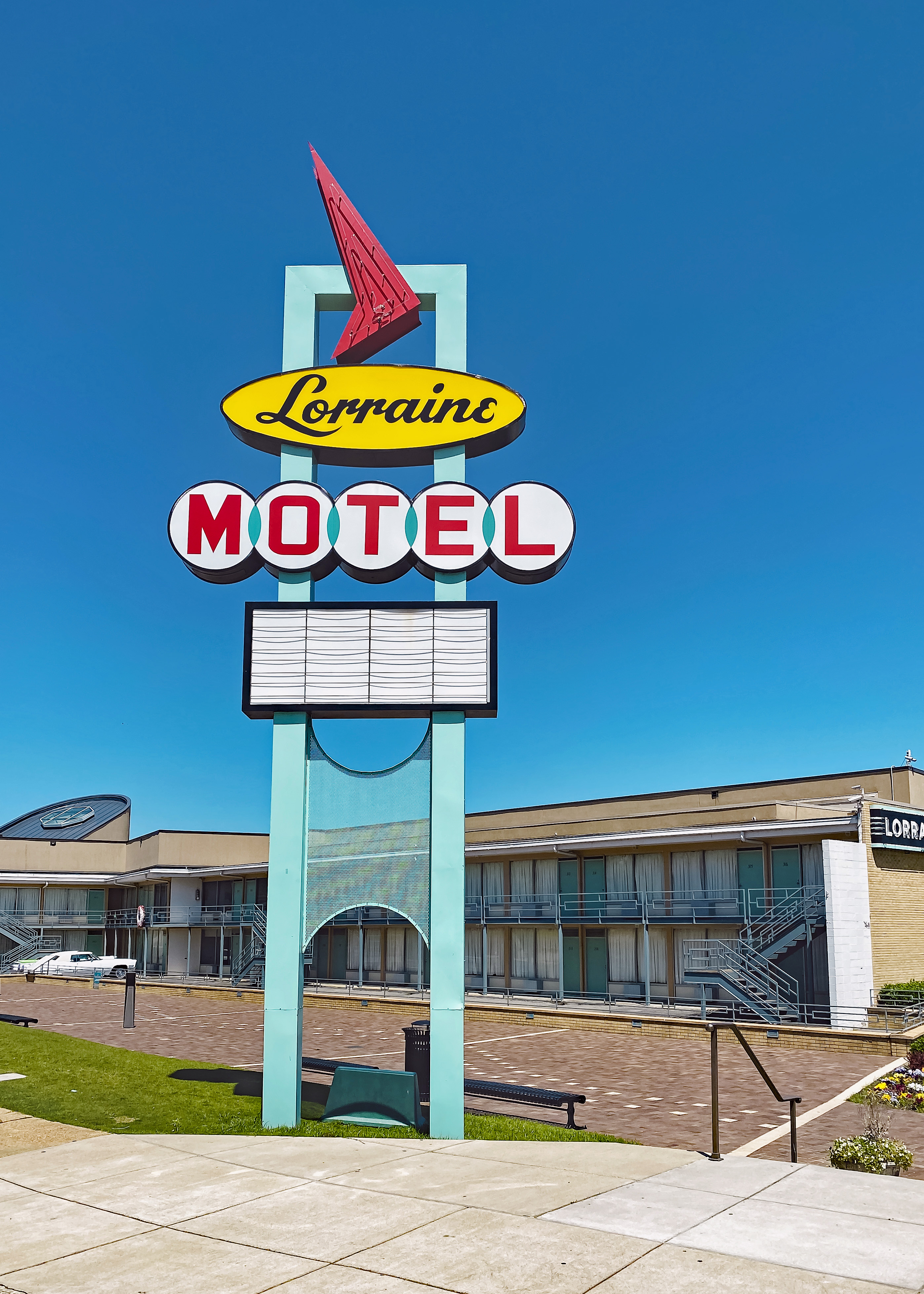
Historic Lorraine Motel sign

The Foundation worked with Smithsonian Institution curator Benjamin Lawless to develop a design to save historical aspects of the site. The Nashville, Tennessee firm McKissack and McKissack was tapped to design a modern museum on those portions of the grounds that were not directly related to the assassination.

A groundbreaking ceremony for the museum was held on January 27, 1989. The museum was dedicated on July 4, 1991, and officially opened to the public on September 28, 1991. D'Army Bailey was the founding president of the museum.

In 1999, the Foundation acquired the Young and Morrow Building, and its associated vacant lot on the West side of Mulberry, as part of the museum complex. A tunnel was built under the lot to connect the building with the motel. The Foundation became the custodian of the police and evidence files associated with the assassination, including the rifle and fatal bullet. The latter are on display in a 12,800-square-foot (1,190 m^{2}) exhibit in the former Y & M building, which opened September 28, 2002.

=== Renegotiation of lease with state in 2007 ===
Through the years, there has been controversy over composition of the board of the museum Foundation and of the mission of the museum, as people have differing opinions. These issues came to a head in December 2007, as the museum foundation was asking the state, which owned the property, to extend its lease for 50 years rent-free. D'Army Bailey, a circuit court judge and founder of the museum, said he was disappointed with the museum's emphasis on history. He said that he had envisioned it as an institution to inspire activism. By 2007, members of the board included whites from the corporate world. Bailey and other community activists criticized the board as "too white" and claimed they were shutting out the community. Beverly Robertson, then director of the museum, defended the board and the museum's operation.

Gregory Duckett, a board member, disagreed with Bailey's interpretation, saying the museum was never designed as an activist institution. Robertson noted that many board members were African Americans who had been activists and also entered corporate life. In 2007, the state agreed to a 20-year lease, while taking over major maintenance of the complex. It required the museum board to hold annual public meetings and increase the number of African-American board members.

=== 2012 renovations ===
The main museum closed in November 2012 for a $27.5 million renovation, to include changes to exhibits and upgrades to building systems. The exhibits were updated for historical accuracy and to add to their evocative power; the work was guided by a group of recognized civil rights scholars. Many of the museum's most popular exhibits did not change, such as Room 306 (where King was staying when he died), the replica sanitation truck (King came to Memphis to support an AFSCME sanitation workers' strike), and the replica of the bus Rosa Parks rode in Montgomery, Alabama, before initiating the Montgomery bus boycott of 1955–1956. The original bus resides at the Henry Ford Museum in Dearborn, Michigan.

In the 2014 reopening, a major new exhibit featured is a replica of the U.S. Supreme Court room where oral argument was heard in 1954 in the seminal Brown v. Board of Education, in which the Court ruled that segregation in public schools was unconstitutional. This was a major victory for the civil rights movement. The museum has several interactive kiosks where patrons can access audio, images, text and video about the full civil rights movement. Visitors can search for text based on event, location, or theme. Many exhibits now feature "listening stations" where patrons with headphones can hear audio about the exhibit they are seeing; one features the voice of Malcolm X in a debate. More than 40 new short films throughout the museum also enhance the effect of the exhibits.

The renovated museum opened to the public on April 5, 2014. A review by the Associated Press described it as "an evocative, newly immersive museum experience that chronicles the history of the civil rights struggle in America." King scholar Clayborne Carson of Stanford University said that the museum's renovations present "the best and most recent scholarship on civil rights available today".

== See also ==
- The Witness: From the Balcony of Room 306
- Birmingham Civil Rights Institute
- International Civil Rights Center and Museum site of the Greensboro, North Carolina sit-ins
- National Voting Rights Museum
- Center for Civil and Human Rights
- The Mountaintop (2009 play)
- Mississippi Civil Rights Museum
- List of memorials to Martin Luther King Jr.
- List of museums in Tennessee
- List of museums focused on African Americans
- Civil rights movement in popular culture
