= Memphis Area Transit Authority =

Public transportation provider for Memphis, Tennessee

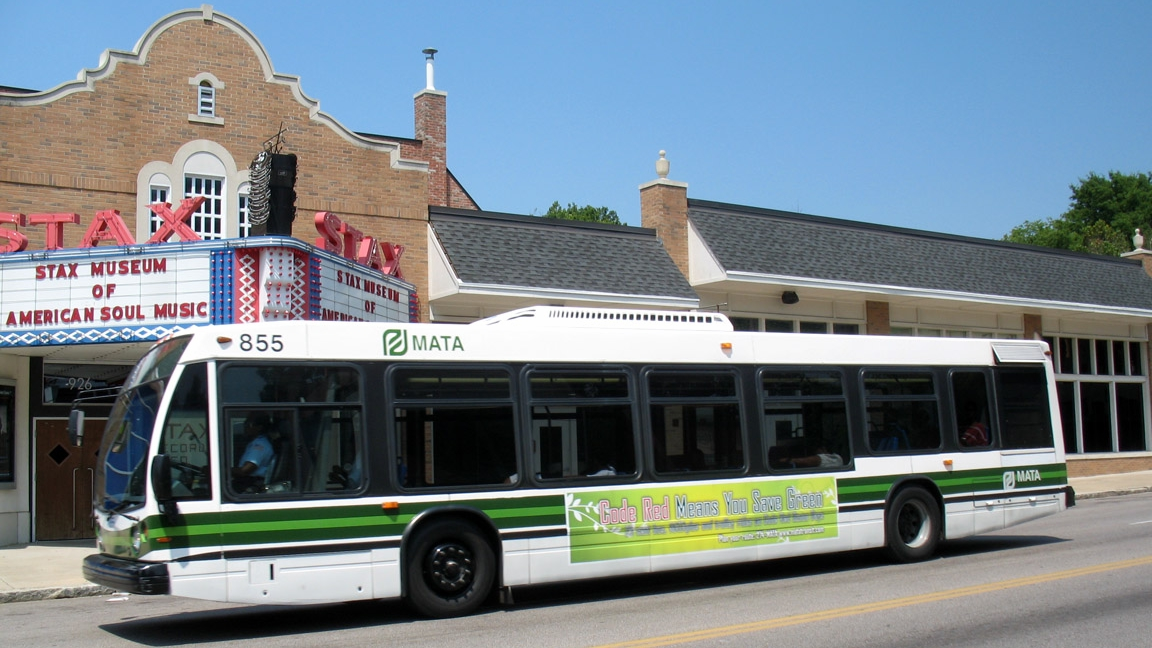
- Founded: May 13, 1975; 51 years ago
- Headquarters: 1370 Levee Road; Memphis, TN
- Locale: Memphis, Tennessee
- Service type: Bus; Trolley; Paratransit
- Routes: 24 (bus); 3 (trolley)
- Fleet: 122 buses 5 trolleys
- Daily ridership: 11,100 (total, weekdays, Q2 2026); 8,800 (bus, weekdays, Q2 2026); 0 (trolley, weekdays, Q2 2026)
- Annual ridership: 2,507,000 (total, 2025); 2,293,100 (bus, 2025); 0 (trolley, 2025)
- Fuel type: Diesel, diesel-hybrid, and electric
- Chief executive: Rodrick Holmes (interim)
- Website: matatransit.com

The Memphis Area Transit Authority (MATA) is the public transportation provider for Memphis, Tennessee, United States. It is one of the largest transit providers in the state of Tennessee with more than 2,507,000 trips carried in 2025. MATA serves Memphis and parts of Shelby County on fixed-route buses, paratransit vehicles, demand-responsive service, and the MATA Trolley system. The system is managed by a seven-member policy board appointed by the mayor and approved by the Memphis City Council.

== History ==
=== Predecessors ===
In December 1960, the stakeholders of the privately owned Memphis Transit Co (MTC), successor to the Memphis Street Railway Company, voted to sell the system to the City of Memphis due to high operating losses. The following month, the City issued bonds to complete the acquisition and purchase 40 new air-conditioned GM New Look buses for the newly formed Memphis Transit Authority (MTA). The MTC continued to manage the system, but a board of commissioners was appointed by the City to set fares, fix routes, buy equipment, and make contracts.

Over the next few years, MTA bought and sold buses to modernize its fleet. MTA continued to purchase buses from GM after finding demo Flxible New Look buses unsatisfactory due to issues with the air conditioning units. Despite the fleet improvements and increased service, ridership began to decline.

=== Early years ===
MATA was established by a city ordinance on May 13, 1975 to replace the MTA. The change increased the size of the board from three members to seven and gave the board the authority to hire a management firm to run the company. Purchasing power was transferred from the MTA purchasing department to a City purchasing agent. This change was made in part because of poor publicity due to decisions made by MTA manager Tom Evans and city chief administrative officer Clay Huddleston.

In 1981, MATA suffered from insufficient operating funds due cuts in federal and state subsidies and insufficient city funding. To make ends meet, MATA cut service and raised fares in September 1981 and again in April 1982. At the end of the year, MATA restored Sunday service and started an advertising campaign to restore its public image. In 1983, MATA started operating MAN articulated buses to reduce personnel costs on busy routes. The lack of wheelchair accommodations was met with pushback from disabled riders.

=== Trolley and light rail ===
In 1986, MATA board approved a plan to turn the declining Mid-America Mall (located on Main Street) into a transit mall, with existing bus routes running along it. However, due to pushback, the imitation-trolley shuttle bus and streetcar alternatives were chosen for further consideration. MATA began awarding construction contracts in 1991, and trolley operations began on April 29, 1993.

In June 1997, MATA completed a regional transit plan studying the construction of light rail along three corridors originating in Downtown Memphis: north to Frayser and Millington, southeast to Germantown and Collierville, and south to Whitehaven and Southaven. The Regional Rail Steering Committee was established in 1999 to guide the planning process and performing public outreach about the development. On January 22, 2001, the MATA Board of Commissioners formally adopted the corridor between Downtown and the Memphis International Airport for further study. The Board voted to eliminate consideration of bus rapid transit and monorail technology for the corridor in September 2001. The final two alternatives were both extensions of the Madison Avenue trolley. However, the rail network plan was shelved in the 2003 due to financial constraints and opposition from businesses in Cooper-Young. The project came to a halt by 2012.

In 2004, MATA studied purchasing hybrid electric buses to reduce emissions and fuel consumption. MATA received their first Gillig hybrid buses in 2007 and piloted them on MATAplus service. By 2010, MATA bought 15 hybrid buses and planned to buy 12 more, bringing the total to 15% of their fleet.

=== Since 2010 ===
In 2017, MATA started development for the Transit Vision network redesign plan to reverse declining ridership. The final report was completed in March 2019. It included both a short-term recommended network to be implemented in 2022 as well as a long-term network to be implemented by 2040. In November 2019, the U.S. DOT awarded MATA a $12 million grant to fund the design and construction of the Memphis Innovation Corridor. The final design consisted of an 8-mile (13 km) bus rapid transit line running from downtown to the University of Memphis using battery-electric buses. MATA received another $76 million in 2022 for purchasing buses and constructing maintenance facilities and charging stations for them. MATA received the first three battery buses in July 2023 and made plans to purchase 40 additional buses by December 2024.

In February 2024, Deputy CEO Bacarra Mauldin became interim CEO after Gary Rosenfeld stepped down from the position. In May, Mauldin announced the discovery of a $60 million budget deficit through the Tennessee Comptroller. On August 27, MATA finalized its fiscal year 2025 budget, eliminating six routes and laying off 241 employees to reduce the operating budget by $10 million. In September, the board of commissioners approved the cuts. But in November, Mayor Paul Young replaced all board members after receiving a diagnostic report from TransPro Consulting identifying issues with the bus system. The new board subsequently postponed the budget cuts and fare changes to February 2025.

In January 2025, the board of commissioners signed an eight-month contract with TransPro for interim staffing, appointing John Lewis as CEO of MATA. In September 2025, Memphis City Council appointed two trustees to manage MATA after vetoing the board's efforts to find a permanent CEO following the end of TransPro's contract.

== Service ==
=== Buses ===
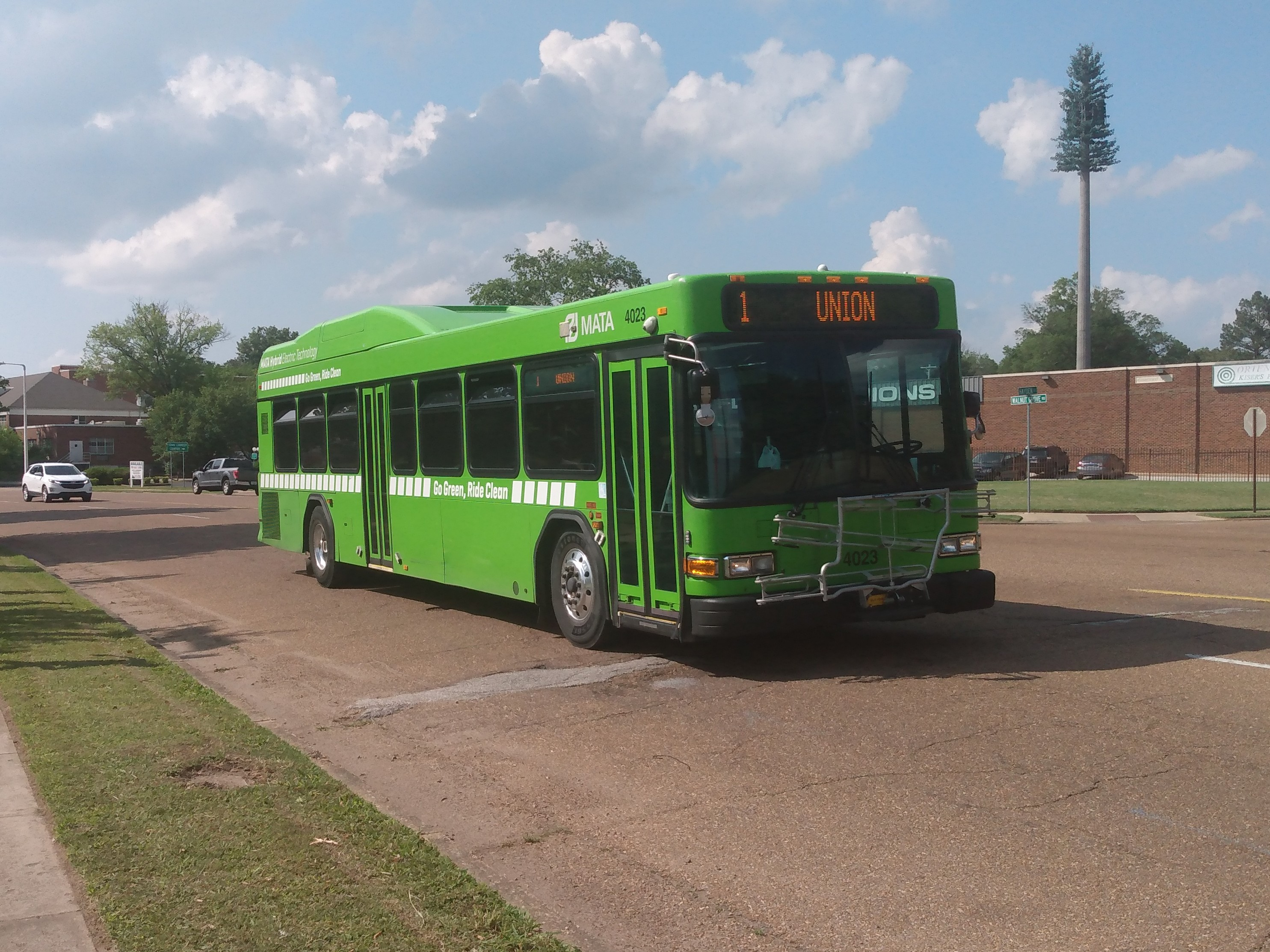
A MATA hybrid bus on route 1

As of August 2025, MATA operates 24 fixed-route bus routes. Most bus routes terminate at William Hudson Transit Center. On MATA's system map, bus routes are organized into three categories based on rush hour frequency: high frequency routes have 30-minute weekday frequency, medium frequency routes have 60-minute weekday frequency, and low frequency routes have greater than 60-minute weekday frequency. MATA also operates a shuttle service to Liberty Park from Downtown Memphis and the University of Memphis for the Southern Heritage Classic football game.

In the past, MATA's roster included AM General 40 ft. buses, RTS buses, Neoplan articulated buses, and NovaBus LFS buses. The LFS was MATA's preferred fleet of choice, having been used in its lineup from February 1980 until its retirement in April 2010, when the six remaining 1994 NovaBus versions were replaced with the Gillig Advantage Hybrids. Today, MATA's fixed-route fleet consists primarily of diesel, BRT, diesel-electric, and battery-electric Gillig Low Floor buses. These buses can hold 40 people seated and are equipped with bike racks, Wi-Fi, and a wheelchair ramp. In 2026, MATA received the first delivery of a $48 million fleet replacement order.

==== Current routes ====
Route	Terminals		Ridership (FY2024)	Notes
1 Union	Hudson Transit Center	Walnut Grove Rd and Racine St	90,308	
2 Madison	Hudson Transit Center	University of Memphis	63,500	
2 Madison	Hudson Transit Center	Knight Arnold Rd and Ridgeway Blvd	63,500	No weekend service.
4 Walker	Hudson Transit Center	Airways Transit Center	40,638	
7 Shelby & Holmes	Airways Transit Center	Shelby Dr and Kirby Parkway	25,845	Service from Watkins St and Hudson Transit Center weekday mornings only
8 Chelsea & Highland	Hudson Transit Center	Airways Transit Center	138,376	Highland branch and National branch combined spring 2022, improving headway on Highland branch.
11 Frayser	Hudson Transit Center	Yale Rd and Austin Peay Hwy	90,051	Serves the Amazon facility on New Allen Rd.
12 Mallory	Hudson Transit Center	Airways Transit Center	48,963	No Sunday/ Holiday Service. Serves the Airways Transit Center.
13 Lauderdale	Hudson Transit Center	Alice Ave and Benton St	4,457	
16 Southeast Circulator	American Way Transit Center	Airways Transit Center	14,381	
19 Vollintine	Hudson Transit Center	Summer Ave and Mendenhall Rd	46,813	No Sunday/Holiday Service.
19 Vollintine	Hudson Transit Center	Wolfchase Galleria	46,813	No Sunday/Holiday Service.
28 Airport	Hudson Transit Center	IRS	14,082	The route ends at Memphis Int'l Airport on Sundays
30 Brooks	Third St and Eastman St	Riverdale Bend and Winchester Rd	55,966	Serves the Airways and American Way transit centers.
32 Hollywood & Hawkins Mill	Airways Transit Center	Frayser Plaza	78,650	Serves the Airways Transit Center.
34 Central & Walnut Grove	Hudson Transit Center	Humphreys Blvd and Walnut Grove Rd	9,826	No Sunday/Holiday Service. Serves Baptist Memorial Hospital
36 Lamar	Hudson Transit Center	Centennial Dr and Hacks Cross Rd	239,915	36A branch serves Kimball Ave. 36B branch serves Knight Arnold Rd.
37 Perkins	American Way Transit Center	Yale Rd and Austin Peay Hwy	11,284	No Sunday Service. Serves American Way Transit Center
39 South Third	Hudson Transit Center	Jonetta St and Holmes Rd (Horn Lake branch)	106,586	
39 South Third	Hudson Transit Center	Holmes Rd and Third St (Weaver and 3rd branch)	106,586	
40 Stage	Hudson Transit Center	Fletcher Trace Pkwy and Stage Rd	55,128	
42 Crosstown	Frayser Plaza	Holmes Rd and Hudgins Rd	213,294	
50 Poplar	Hudson Transit Center	Exeter Rd and Poplar Ave	231,400	
52 Jackson	Hudson Transit Center	Methodist Hospital North	135,773	
53 Summer	Hudson Transit Center	Southwest Tennessee Community College	54,134	
57 Park	Hudson Transit Center	Primacy Pkwy and Ridgeway Rd	91,216	
69 Winchester	American Way Transit Center	Levi Rd and Oakshire	31,257	No Sunday/ Holiday service.

=== Trolley ===
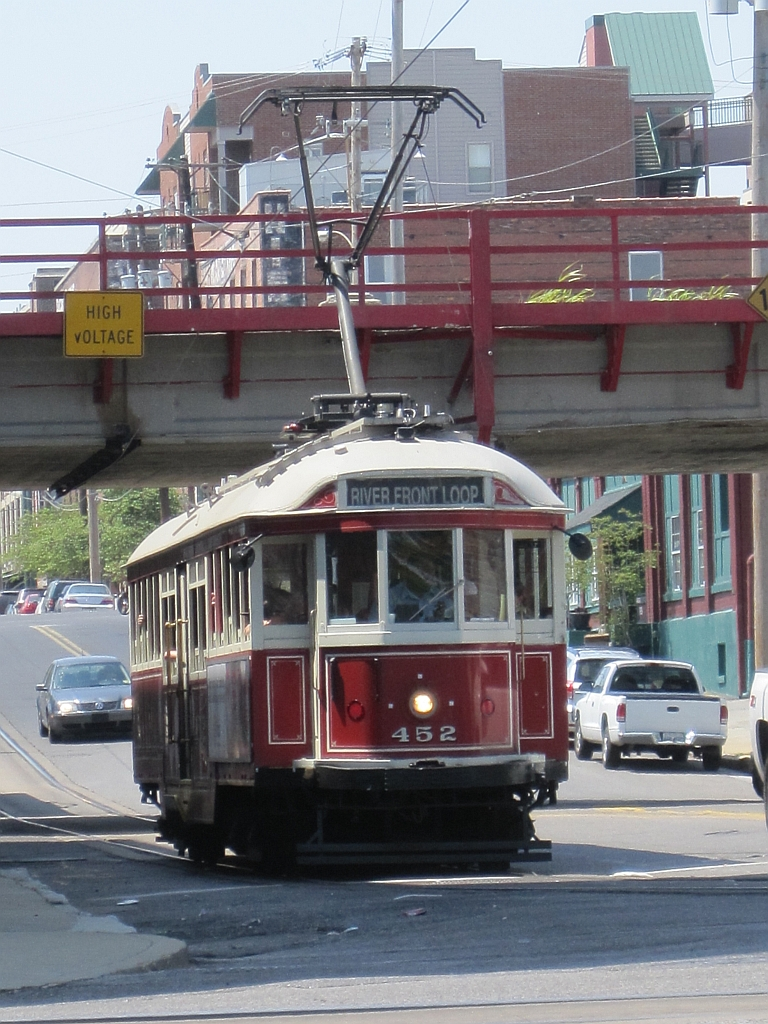
A Riverfront Loop trolley near Central Station

Initially opened in 1993, the Main Street Trolley is a heritage streetcar system that has grown to three routes: one along the riverfront, another serving Main Street in the heart of downtown Memphis, and an extension on Madison Avenue. The Madison Avenue line opened in 2004, as the initial stage of a light rail system that would connect downtown Memphis with the Memphis International Airport and eventually to regional transit service beyond the MATA service boundaries.

Service was replaced by buses after two trolleys caught fire in late 2013 and early 2014. After nearly four years, the Main Street Trolley Line was reinstated in 2018. The Main Street Line operated trolleys with 12-minute headways throughout the day. The Riverfront Line and Madison Line operated buses with 40-minute and 30-minute headways respectively.

On August 18, 2024, MATA suspended trolley service indefinitely due to issues with brakes that had been investigated and would require costly upgrades per a recommendation from TDOT. The city government funded repairs to the brake systems and anticipates that service could resume in December 2026.

	Line	Opened	Stations	Length	Termini
█	Main Street Line	1993	13	2.0 mi (3.2 km)	Butler Avenue – North End Terminal
█	Riverfront Loop	1997	19	4.1 mi (6.6 km)	none
█	Madison Avenue Line	2004	6	2.2 mi (3.5 km)	Third Street – Cleveland Station

=== Paratransit ===
MATAplus is a paratransit service designed to meet the transportation needs of people with disabilities in Memphis. The service covers the same area as the MATA bus system with hours of operation being determined by the nearest bus route. The service area extends 3/4 mile (1.2 km) beyond the fixed routes. Two types of services are offered through MATAplus: Advance/Demand Response, which allows riders to book reservations in advance, and a subscription service that allows riders to schedule recurring trips that happen multiple times per week.

=== On-demand service ===
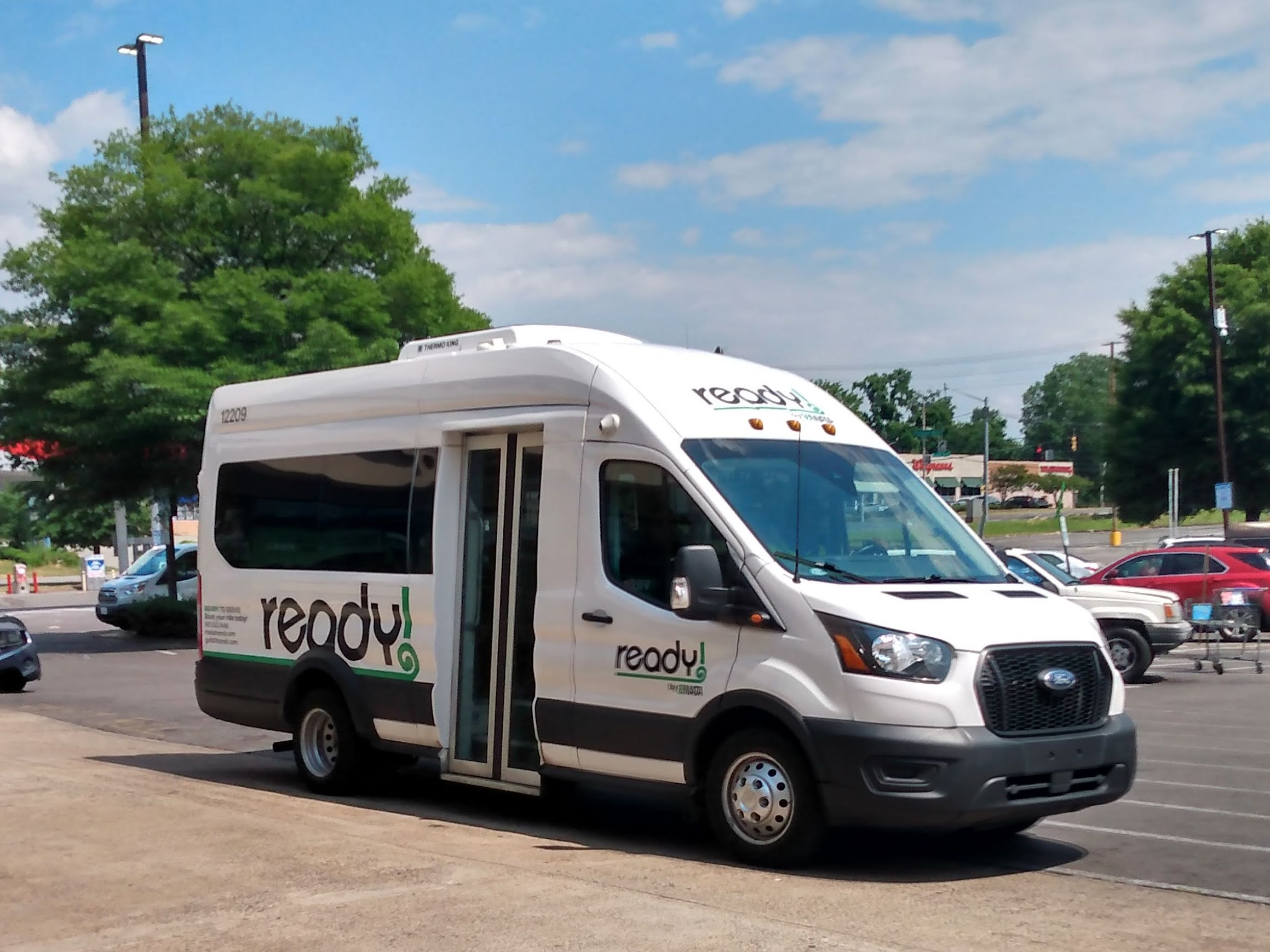
A Ready! van serving Frayser

Groove On-Demand is an on-demand service launched in February 2021. It is the successor to MATA and the Memphis Medical District Collaborative's Route 500 commuter bus. The current service also includes the Downtown Memphis Commission as a major supporter. Groove serves Downtown Memphis, the Medical District, New Chicago, and President's Island. Groove operates using software from Via Transportation.

Ready! by MATA is an on-demand service launched in August 2021 as a part of the Transit Vision network redesign. Ready! serves three zones: Zone 1 covers the neighborhoods of Boxtown, Westwood, and Whitehaven. Zone 2 consists of Northaven and Frayser. Zone 3 is mostly in Cordova. Reservations works similarly to ride hailing services, but payments can be made through the GO901 app or in-person with cash. Fares are the same as fixed-route buses.

In the 2023–24 fiscal year, Groove served 101,473 riders. Ready! served 43,930 riders in southwest Memphis, 17,694 in Northaven/Frayser, and 4,567 in Cordova.

== Projects ==
mConnect is a planned bus rapid transit line along the Memphis Innovation Corridor from downtown Memphis to the University of Memphis along Union Avenue. The 8.5 mile line would use nine electric buses serving 28 stations at a 10-minute frequency. The project began as a recommendation of the Midtown Alternatives Analysis in 2014 and secured a $12 million federal grant for further planning and design work in 2019. By 2023, it was estimated that construction would begin imminently with an opening in 2027. However, as of 2026, no further progress has been made as a result of MATA budgetary issues.

== Fares ==
MATA currently does not charge fares as part of its Zero-Fare Pilot Program, which began on November 16, 2025. The pilot was originally supposed to end in February 2026, but was extended 45 days. MATA Trustee Rodrick Holmes has signaled support to extend the Zero-Fare Pilot further and wants to look at it, "every 45 days".

MATA charged a flat fare for all trips. From June 20, 2020 to November 16, 2025, the full fare was $1 and the senior/disabled fare was $0.50. MATA also offered a Daily Fast Pass for $2 ($1 for seniors and disabled individuals), but hasn't offered 7-day or 31-day passes since the beginning of the COVID-19 pandemic.

GO901 Smart Card

In September 2020, MATA launched GO901, a mobile fare app that allowed users to purchase fares and day passes using debit and credit cards. In conjunction with the app, MATA started offering free Wi-Fi on vehicles starting in December 2019. On August 21, 2023, MATA launched the GO901 Smart Card, which could have been refilled on the app or at kiosks and service counters at MATA's transit centers. The Smart Card only supports pay-as-you-go payment and can be set up to automatically refill itself.

== Facilities ==
MATA administrative offices are on the 12th floor of One Commerce Square. In 2023, more space was leased for staff working on capital projects. The Trolley Operations and Maintenance facility is located at 547 North Main Street. The operations center and road vehicle maintenance facility are located at 1370 Levee Road. The facility was opened in 1981 and is located on top of an old garbage dump.

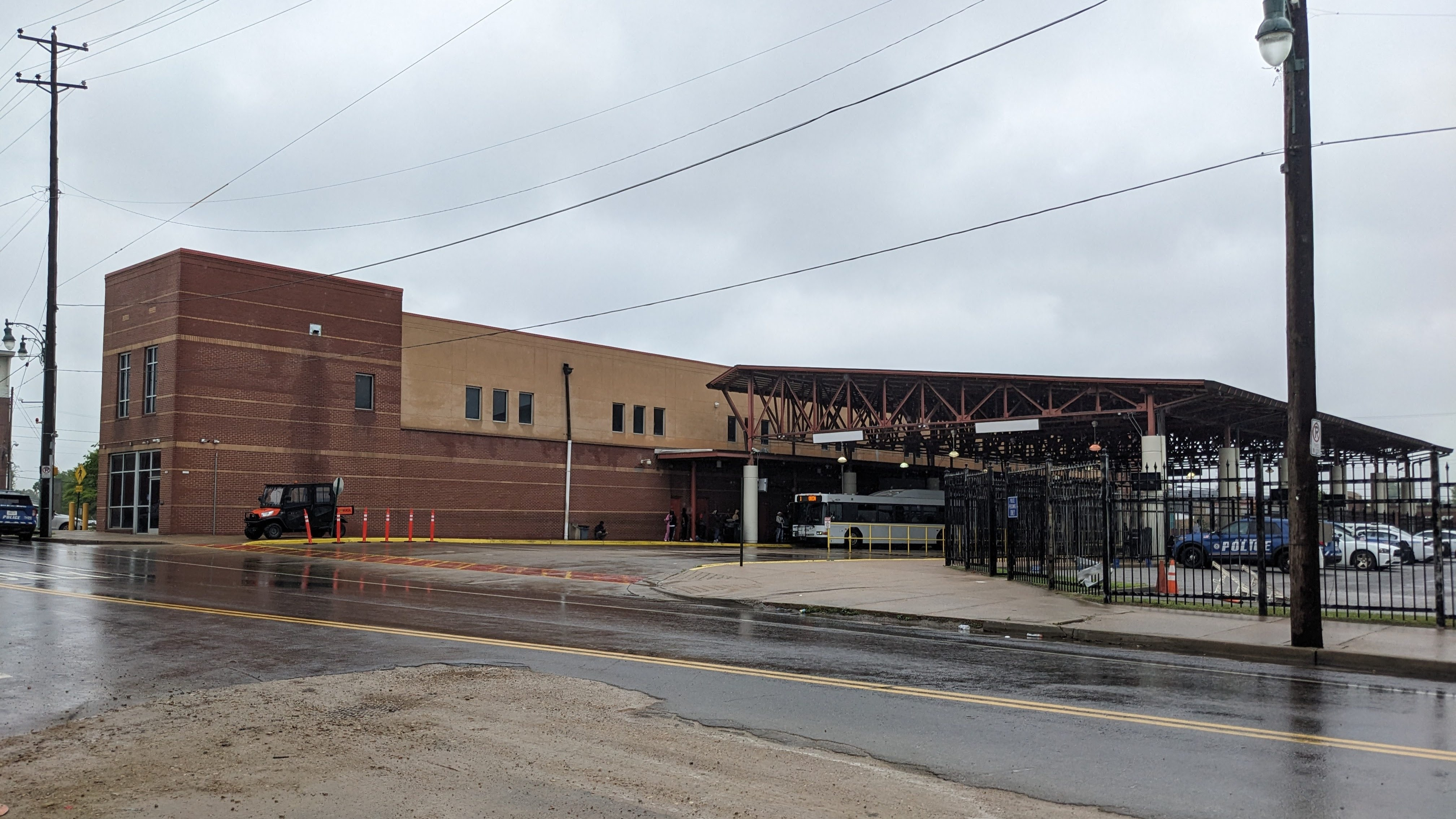
William Hudson Transit Center

MATA owns three transit centers, two of which have parking, and one park-and-ride lot. MATA also designates several malls as informal park-and-ride lots on its map.

Name	Location	Coordinates	Notes
William Hudson Transit Center	444 North Main Street	35°09′23.5″N 90°02′52″W	Serves as the chief hub of the system and main transfer point for all downtown routes. Formerly known as the North End Terminal.
Central Station	545 South Main Street	35°7′56″N 90°3′33″W	Serves as a southern transfer point for routes 12, Riverfront Loop Trolley, and the Main Street Trolley as well as the connection point for Amtrak.
American Way Transit Center	3921 American Way	35°04′33.7″N 89°55′58.7″W	Serves as a suburban transfer location for routes: 7,8,16,30,36,37, and 69.
Airways Transit Center	3033 Airways Boulevard	35°3′42″N 89°59′33″W	Serves a southern transfer point for routes: 4,12,16,28,30,32, as well as Greyhound and Jefferson Lines intercity buses.
Madison Park-and-Ride Lot	Madison Avenue at Claybrook Street	35°8′21.5″N 90°1′3″W	Serves the nearby routes 2 and 42, and the Madison Avenue Line.

== Ridership ==
The ridership statistics shown here are of bus and streetcar fixed-route services only and do not include demand response services.

== See also ==
- Memphis Suspension Railway – Defunct suspended monorail connecting Downtown Memphis to Mud Island.
- List of bus transit systems in the United States
