= MATA Trolley =

Streetcar system in Memphis, Tennessee

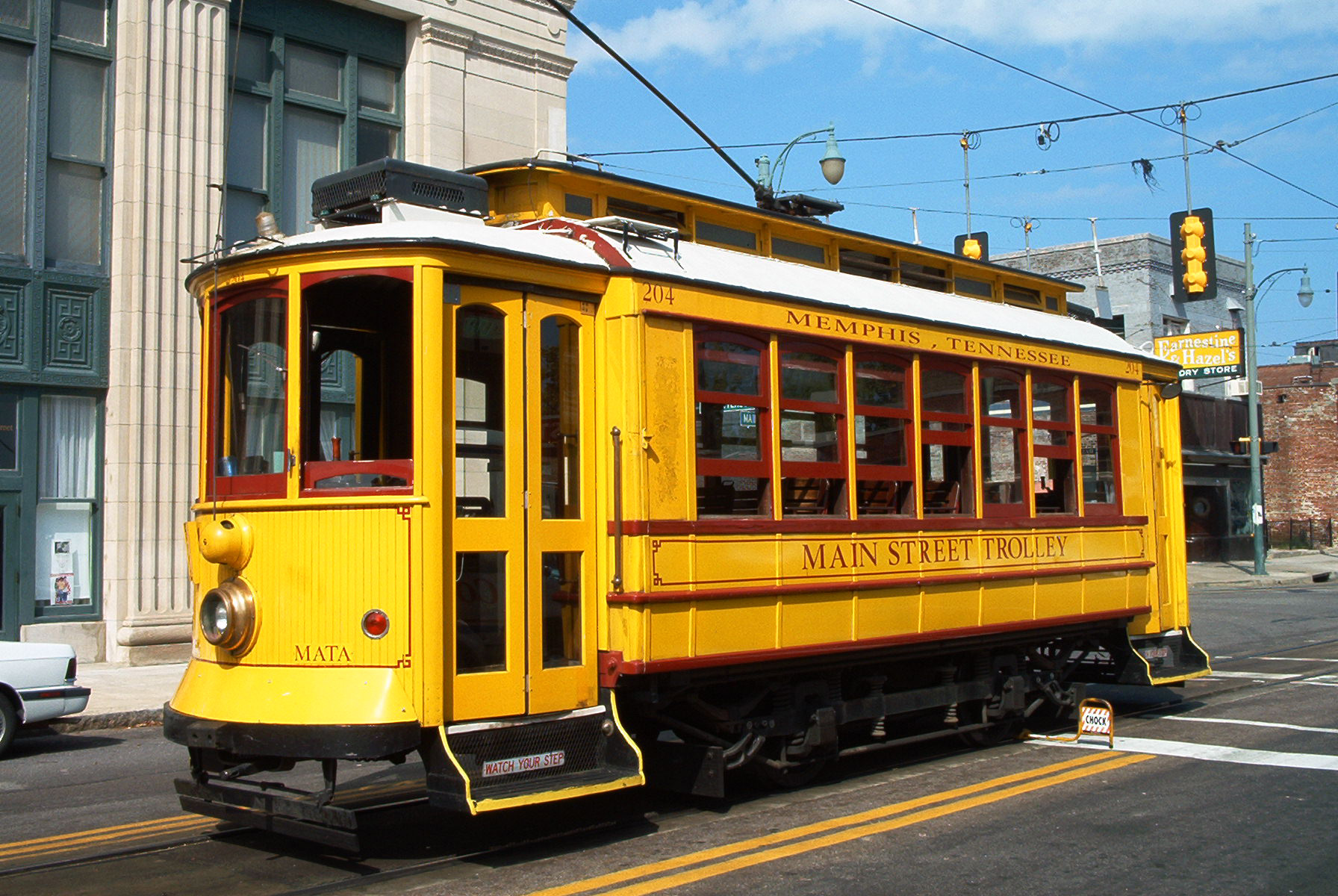
- Former Porto trolley on the Main Street Line in 2002 or 2003; its trolley pole was replaced by a pantograph soon after.

Operation
- Locale: Memphis, Tennessee
- Open: April 29, 1993
- Status: Suspended
- Routes: 3 (of which two have been temporarily suspended, i.e. bus-operated, since 2014, the third since August 2024)
- Operator: Memphis Area Transit Authority (MATA)

Infrastructure
- Track gauge: 4 ft 8 1/2 in (1,435 mm) standard gauge
- Propulsion system: Electric
- Electrification: Overhead line, 600 V DC

Statistics
- Track length (total): 10 mi (16.1 km)
- Route length: 6.3 mi (10.1 km)
- Stops: 25
- Annual ridership: 0 (2025)
Overview
Key
- Website: https://www.matatransit.com/trolley/routes/

The MATA Trolley is a heritage streetcar system in Memphis, Tennessee operated by Memphis Area Transit Authority. The first line opened in 1993 and consisted of three lines by 2004. These lines are the Main Street Line, the Riverfront Loop, and the Madison Avenue Line. Service on the latter two lines was suspended in June 2014, following fires on two trolleys and remains indefinitely suspended as of May 2024. The Main Street Line was reopened in 2018, but all service was suspended again in August 2024 after the Tennessee Department of Transportation began investigating braking issues with the trolley cars. As of August 2026, MATA was predicting the service would resume operation in fall 2026.

The last line of Memphis' original streetcar network closed on June 15, 1947.

In the 2011–12 fiscal year, 1.34 million trips were made on the system, a 23.1% year-on-year growth—the highest of any light rail system in the contiguous United States.

== History ==
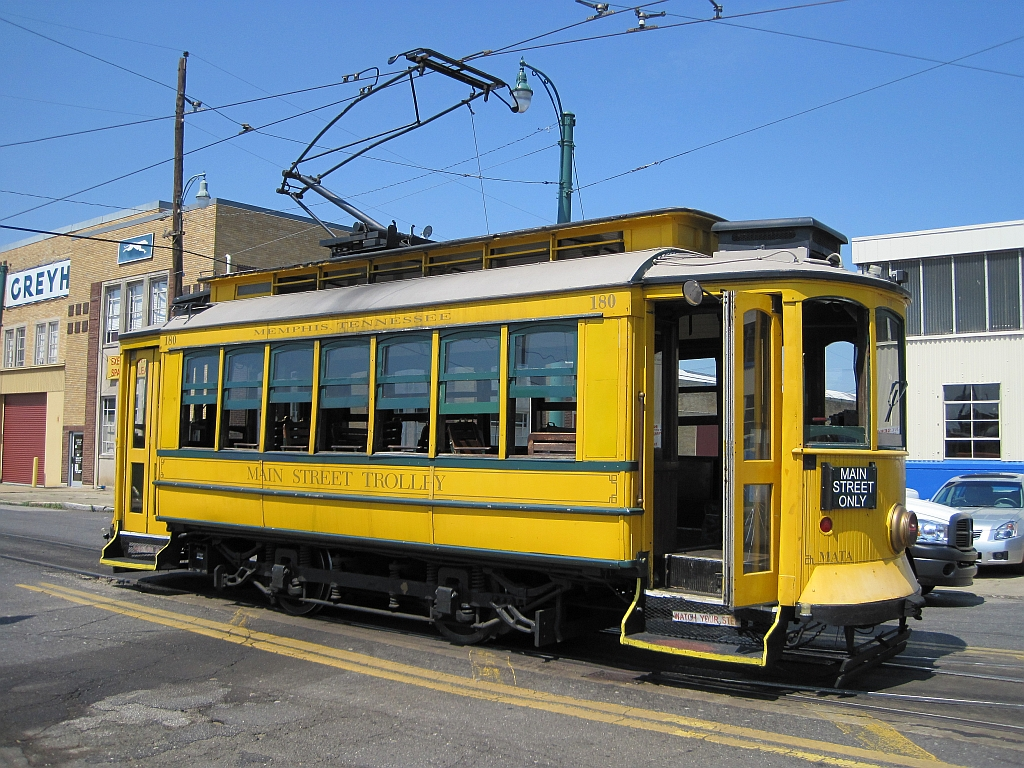
Ex-Porto car 180 on Main St in 2010

Originally proposed as a 4.9-mile (7.9 km) line along the Mississippi River, the Memphis City Council voted 9-4 in January 1990 to build the 2.5-mile (4 km), $33 million Main Street route. After multiple delays, construction of the line commenced in February 1991 for completion by December 1992. However, due to the longer-than-anticipated restoration of the vintage streetcars, the opening of the line was delayed until spring 1993. After further delay, testing of the first of the restored cars began on March 10, 1993, and the system opened to the public on April 29, 1993.

On October 1, 1997, the Riverfront line opened. The system's third line, running east from Main Street along Madison Avenue for about 2 miles (3.2 km), opened on March 15, 2004. It was completed at a cost of about $56 million, which was approximately 25 percent below the original budget forecast for the project.

Trolley operation on the Madison Avenue Line was suspended in May 2014 following electrical fires in two trolleys operating on that line in the previous six months. On June 10, the suspension was expanded to include all MATA trolley lines after it was determined that much of the fleet would need to be renovated. At that time, the suspension was expected to last at least six months until a feasible solution could be found. Options included restoring the existing fleet at a cost of $6 million, or replacing them with new heritage streetcars at a cost of $40 million. After thorough inspection of the fleet, MATA decided to overhaul several cars rather than purchase new ones, and to eventually reinstate service using only overhauled cars. In December 2014, MATA announced that it was not yet able to give an estimated date for the resumption of service. In March 2015, it was announced that limited trolley service might be possible in May or June, but there was still no timetable for full restoration of service. In October 2016, Memphis Mayor Jim Strickland said trolleys would not be back in service before 2017.

=== Reopening and resuspension ===
Service on the Main Street Line resumed on April 30, 2018. The Main Street Line was extended to Memphis Central Station in February 2021.

On November 3, 2021, MATA announced a plan to test a modern streetcar from San Diego on the Madison Avenue Line, on which rail service has been suspended since 2014. MATA acquired the 1988-built Siemens–Duewag U2 light rail vehicle from the San Diego Trolley light rail system in fall 2020, and the car arrived in Memphis in April 2021. At that time, the other two lines were forecast to reopen within two years, but as of December 2022 they both remained indefinitely suspended (routes served by buses). In September 2021, MATA was predicting that the Riverfront Loop would reopen when three used Birney-replica cars acquired from Memphis in late 2020 were ready to enter service, which at the time was forecast for circa late 2022. Service on the Madison Avenue Line was planned to be restored sometime after 2022, when testing of the Siemens-Duewag U2 LRV on the line was expected to be completed and more vehicles purchased.

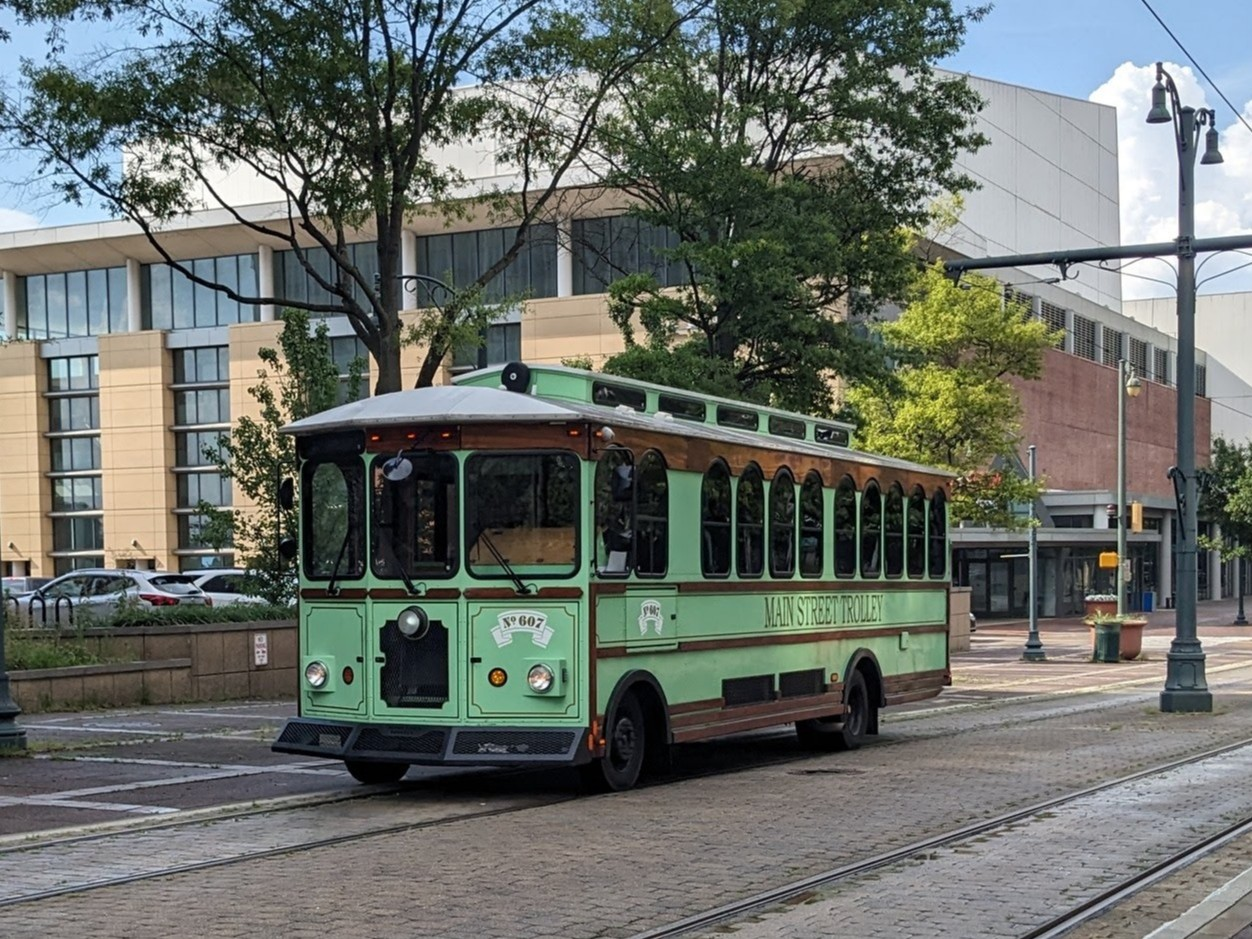
Imitation-trolley bus on Main Street in 2025

On August 18, 2024, MATA announced that service on the Main Street Line was suspended again indefinitely at the request of the Tennessee Department of Transportation after a braking issue arose, for the second time in nine months, while an investigation into the cause proceeded. As there was no estimate at that time for when service might be able to resume, all trolley operators were laid off. In October, MATA estimated that service on the Main Street line would resume in summer 2025. In June 2025, MATA began temporarily operating rubber-tired trolleys along Main Street. Interim CEO John Lewis announced that the trolleys could be repaired for a fraction of the cost quoted by previous leaders.

MATA hopes to reopen the trolley system in fall 2026. More specifically, MATA has stated that it is aiming the reopen the trolley system "by December 15".

== Lines ==
The MATA Trolley network consists of three lines. There are stations at 24 locations (inbound and outbound stations are counted as a single location), and 35 of the stations are sheltered and ADA-accessible.

Name	Opened	Stations	Length	Termini
Main Street Line	1993	14	2.5 mi (4.0 km)	Central Station – Hudson Transit Center
Riverfront Loop	1997	18	4.5 mi (7.2 km)	none
Madison Avenue Line	2004	7	2.5 mi (4.0 km)	Third Street – Cleveland Station

== Rolling stock ==
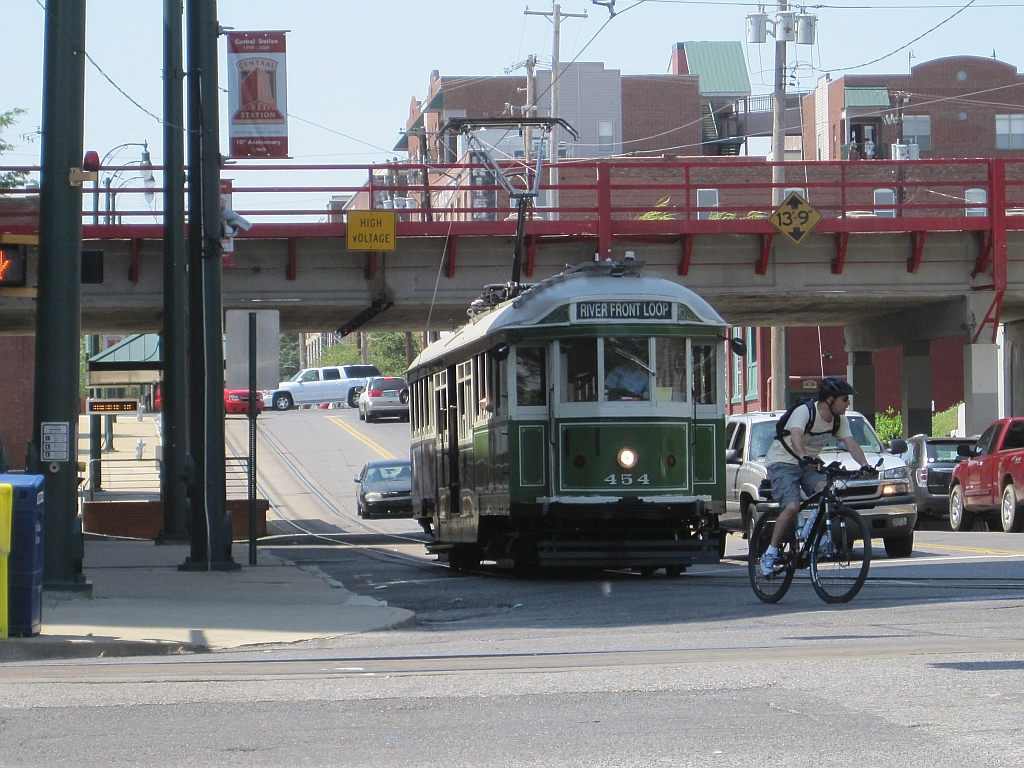
Ex-Melbourne trolley in the South Main St Historic District

The trolleys used are almost all restored, vintage streetcars. The original three cars in operation on opening day were all formerly used in Porto, Portugal, and are Car 187, circa 1927; Car 194, circa 1935; and Car 204, circa 1940. These cars are each 30 feet 6 inches (9.3 m) long, 7 feet 10 inches (2.39 m) wide and weigh 25,820 pounds (11,710 kg) without passengers. The cars were restored by Kerns-Wilcheck Associates of Memphis. Three additional ex-Porto cars (156, 164 and 180) joined them within weeks, and the fleet had six cars by May 1993.

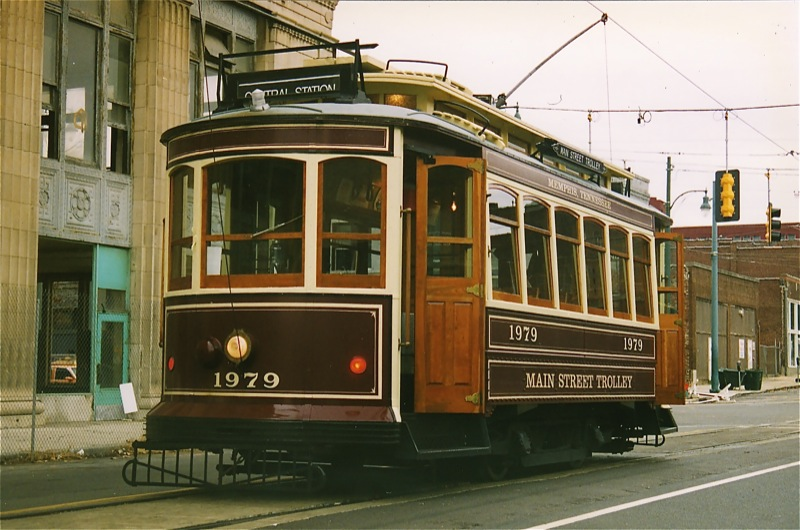
Gomaco-built number 1979, with a trolley pole, in its original livery. By 2003 all of the trolley poles were replaced by pantographs.

Between the mid-1990s and 2003, the fleet expanded considerably in both number and capacity with the arrival of ten reconditioned Melbourne, Australia W2-class cars, all but one (Car 417) supplied by Gomaco Trolley Company. Other additions were single-truck Car 1979 that was built new by Gomaco in 1993, as a demonstrator; double-truck Car 1794 that was originally an open-sided car from Rio de Janeiro, Brazil, but was heavily rebuilt and enclosed before entering service in Memphis, and, in early 2004, a replica Birney Safety Car – again, manufactured by Gomaco, similar to those used on the TECO Line Streetcar in Tampa, Florida, and the Metro Streetcar in Little Rock, Arkansas.

The fleet and overhead wires were converted from trolley pole to pantograph current collection in early 2003, during a three-month suspension of service which started on January 5, 2003.

An eleventh reconditioned Melbourne car, W5-class 799, was purchased in 2016 by MATA with a view toward eventual restarting of trolley service.

In late 2020, MATA acquired three more Gomaco-built replica Birney streetcars, secondhand from the Charlotte Area Transit System, which had used them from 2004 to 2019 on its Charlotte Trolley system and CityLynx Gold Line. As of March 2026, MATA aims to put these streetcars into service in fall 2026.

In 2021, MATA acquired one secondhand Siemens-Duewag U2 LRV from the San Diego Trolley (No. 1035) to be used for testing on the Madison Avenue Line. The vehicle began testing on the line in March 2022. In March 2025, the front of the vehicle was damaged by a fire and the car remains parked today in its significantly damaged state. In 2022, a further seven U2's (no.s 1033, 1066, 1010, 1048, 1049, 1052, and 1026) were purchased, MATA intends to have them refurbished for the line's reopening.

== Accidents and incidents ==
On June 1, 2011, two trolleys – a Melbourne W2-class and Porto number 194 – traveling on Main Street collided due to a power failure. Six people were taken to the hospital, including one MATA employee.

On November 4, 2013, a Melbourne trolley caught fire while operating on the Madison Avenue Line. On April 10, 2014, another Melbourne trolley caught fire on Madison Avenue, leading to the closure of the route.

== See also ==
- Memphis Suspension Railway
- Memphis Street Railway Company
- List of heritage railroads in the United States
- List of rail transit systems in the United States
- Streetcars in North America
