= 201 Poplar =

Address for criminal justice organization in Memphis, Tennessee

Coordinates: 35.1490°N 90.0479°W

201 Poplar Avenue is the street address for the Walter L. Bailey, Jr. Criminal Justice Center in Memphis, Tennessee. It is alluded to in many rap songs by artists hailing from Memphis.

The Complex houses several courts, including General Sessions Criminal Courts, most located on the lower level of the building, felony courts on the upper levels, Police and Sheriff's offices, the District Attorney General's office, as well as the Office of the Public Defender. The jail complex at 225 and 271 Poplar is attached to the building.

== History ==
The building at 201 Poplar was first opened in 1981. In October 2018, the building was renamed the Walter L. Bailey Jr. Criminal Justice Center, after the former county commissioner. In 2018, the county began a $50-million renovation of the entire 12 floor building.

== In popular culture ==
Incomplete list of songs which mention 201 Poplar:

- "Long Nite" by Three 6 Mafia;
- "201 Phone Call (Skit)" by Project Pat;
- “528-Cash” by Project Pat;
- "If You Ain't From My Hood" by Project Pat;
- "Dis Bitch, Dat Hoe" by Project Pat;
- "Flickin" by Frayser Boy
- "201" by Vegas Thunder.
- "Lockdown" by Three 6 Mafia.
- "Out There" By Project Pat ( Fourth Floor Bound = Violent Criminal floor )
- "Push Da Weight" By Evil Pimp
- "On The Run" By Tommy Wright III
- "9 Little Millimeta Boys" By 8Ball & MJG

== See also ==
- Downtown Memphis
- Memphis Police Department
