= South Bluffs, Memphis =

Coordinates: 35°07′52″N 90°03′54″W

South Bluffs
- Gated neighborhood
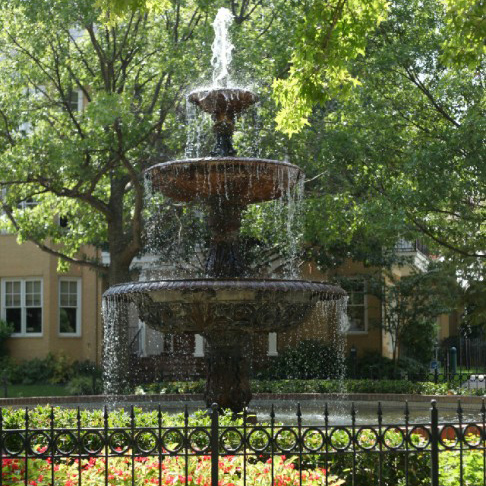
- Fountain between Nottoway and Monteigne Boulevard
- Interactive map of South Bluffs
- Country: United States
- State: Tennessee
- County: Shelby County
- City: Memphis
- District: Downtown
- Settled: 1989
- Founder: Henry Turley Company

South Bluffs is a gated neighborhood located south of Downtown Memphis, Tennessee. The bluff was previously occupied by a 25-acre (10 ha) railroad and switching yard, until 1989 when ground was broken on developing a residential neighborhood. The location of the neighborhood and the views of the Mississippi River have drawn Memphians, such as Pat Halloran and Henry Turley, to purchase homes within the neighborhood.

== Development ==
In 1989, the Henry Turley Company began developing the area. In 1990, homes were open for sale. The neighborhood was founded upon principles of "New Urbanism," and lies on the southern loop of the historic Memphis trolley route. South Bluffs was modeled after neighborhoods in large cities such as Charleston, South Carolina, Savannah, Georgia, and New Orleans. Shaded drives are also named after developments and plantation homes along the Mississippi River in Louisiana and Mississippi.

While houses were being developed (approximately 150) on private streets such as Nottoway Boulevard and Monteigne Boulevard, 260 apartments were built in two intervals. The first consisted of the building of 200 of these and shortly after 60 more were added as the neighborhood attracted more attention.

== Attractions and characteristics ==
South Bluffs has housing for various price brackets, ranging from $150,000 to $2,000,000, which overlook either the neighborhood or the Mississippi River. There is a large amount of apartments within the neighborhood as well, ranging from 1 to 2 bedroom styles. Additionally, the neighborhood contains a residential fitness center, two large pools, and a tennis court.

At the northern end the neighborhood, there is the River Walk that goes out towards Downtown Memphis, providing views of the Mississippi River and Tom Lee Park, where national festivals are held. South Bluffs is also in close proximity to the South Main Arts District, where restaurants and galleries are located.

Streets entering the neighborhood are paved with historic cobblestone and lead to two large fountains located at central intersections within the neighborhood. Large medians are lined with trees, flowered gardens, and 12-foot (3.7 m) high cast iron lights that are capped with historic acorn-style luminaries.
