= Downtown Memphis, Tennessee =

Central business district of Memphis, Tennessee

Coordinates: 35.1389°N 90.0575°W

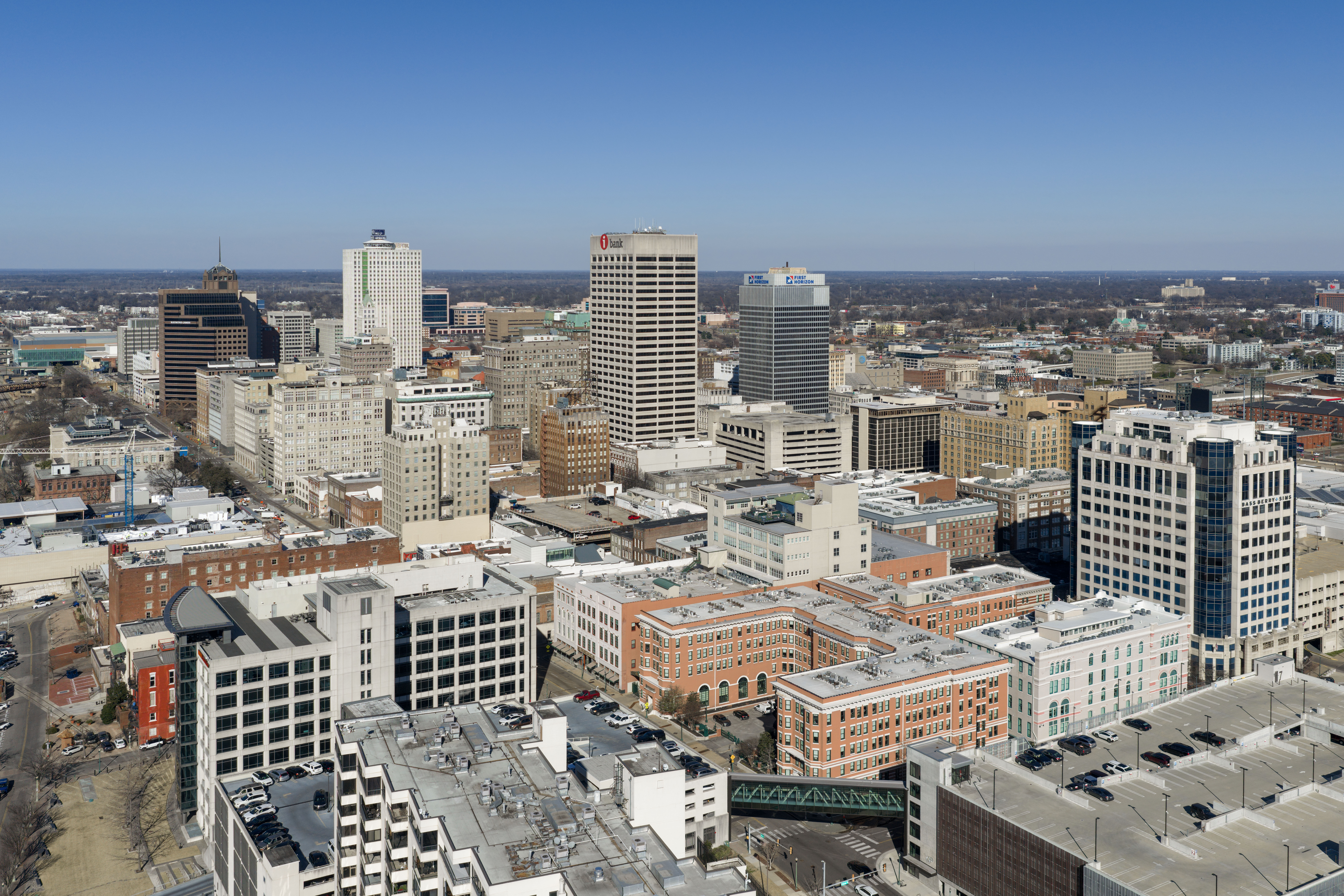
Aerial view of Downtown Memphis

Downtown Memphis is the central business district of Memphis, Tennessee, and is located along the Mississippi River between Interstate 40 to the north, Interstate 55 to the south, and Interstate 240 to the east, where it abuts Midtown Memphis.

The downtown area is home to the Memphis Redbirds, the AAA affiliate of the St. Louis Cardinals, as well as the Memphis Grizzlies NBA team.

== History ==
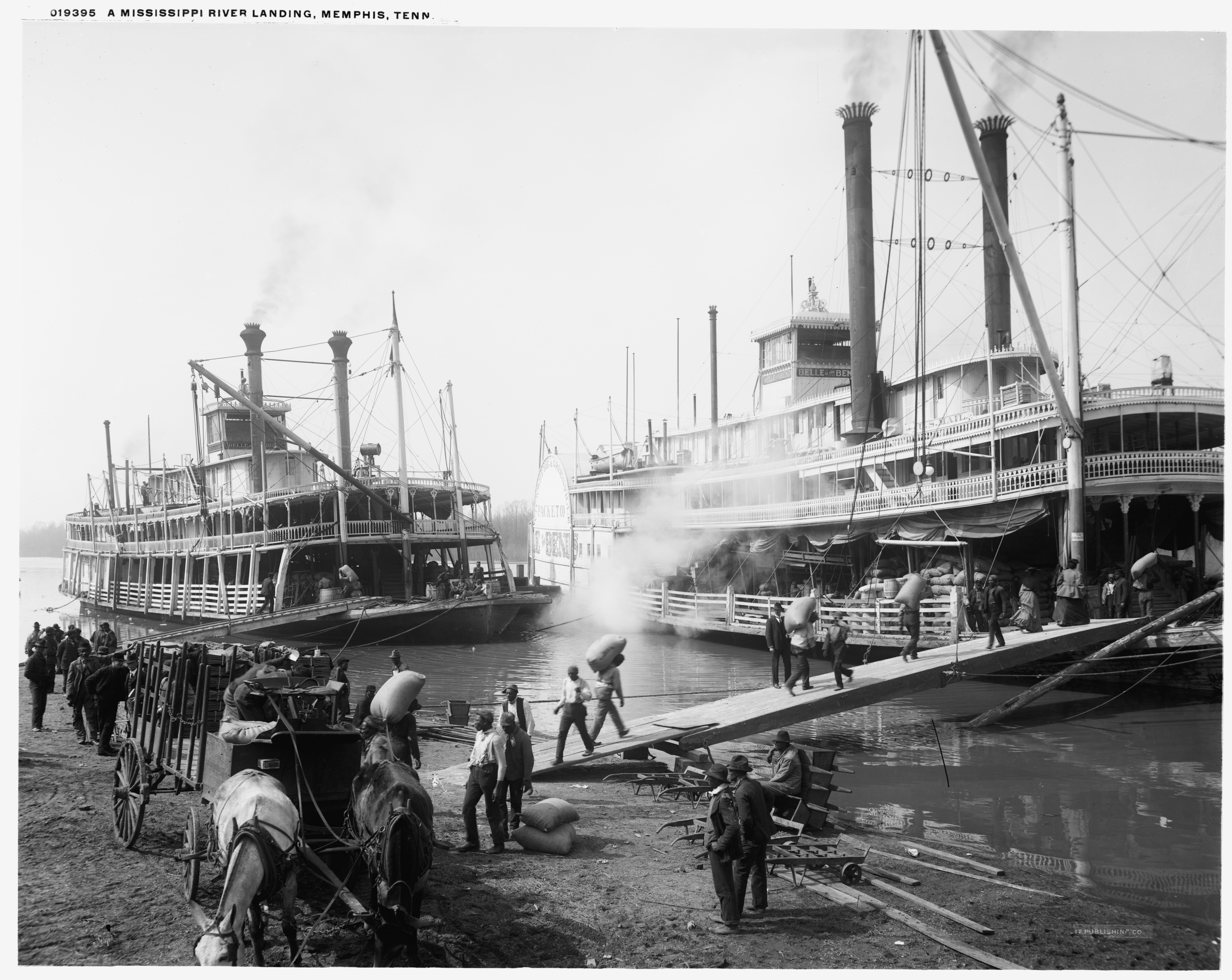
The Memphis river landing (1906)

Downtown Memphis is the oldest part of the city and includes the riverfront and the bluffs overlooking the Mississippi River. The founders of Memphis dedicated the riverfront to the public "now and forever" as long as public use continued. The land overlooking the riverfront was originally planned to become a "public promenade" to be called Mississippi Row. The upper riverfront became the site of the river landing where steamboats were loaded with cotton and other goods in the 19th and early 20th centuries. Between 1844 and 1886 the river landing was paved with limestone and granite cobblestones brought in from the upper Midwest. This created what is today the largest intact Mississippi River landing still in existence, and is listed on the National Register of Historic Places. The explosion of the steamboat Sultana in 1865 near Memphis was one of the worst maritime disasters in history.

There are several historic residences downtown, particularly in the Victorian Village neighborhood. Other historic homes include the Hunt-Phelan House (1830), the Magevney House (c. 1835), and the Burkle Estate (1849). The Burkle home and the Hunt-Phelan House (533 Beale Street) were reputed to have been part of the Underground Railroad by which escaped slaves made their way to freedom prior to the Civil War.

=== Downtown Airport ===
In 1959, the Memphis Downtown Airport was opened on Mud Island, which at that time was called City Island. The one-runway airport could be reached by a pontoon-boat ferry and was used mostly by businessmen and shoppers. The Downtown Airport was closed in 1970. It was replaced in the 1990s by the new urbanist Harbor Town development.

== Overview ==
=== Buildings ===
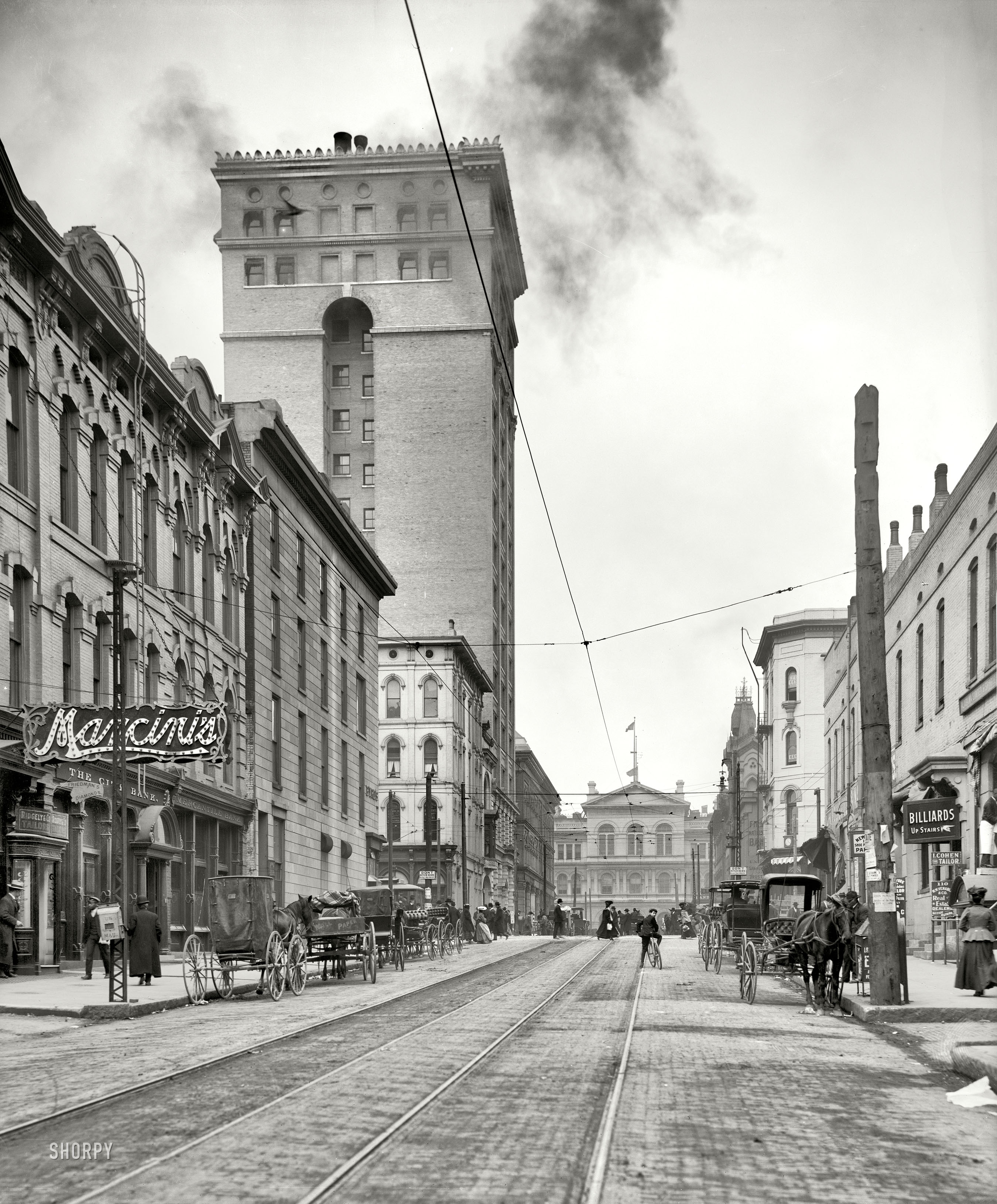
View west on Madison Avenue, ending with the Customs House (1906)

The Downtown Memphis skyline contains the tallest buildings in the city. The tallest building in Memphis, 100 North Main, is located at the heart of downtown along Main Street at Adams Ave and rises to 430 ft (131m). Some notable and/or historic downtown buildings are:

- 100 North Main
- One Commerce Square
- Sterick Building
- Exchange Building, Memphis
- Morgan Keegan Tower
- First Horizon Bank Tower
- Memphis Pyramid
- Peabody Hotel
- Madison Hotel
- Scimitar Building
- FedExForum
- Central Station
- 201 Poplar

Downtown Memphis includes 4.5 million square feet (418,000 square meters) of office space, around 1 million square feet (93,000 square meters) of retail space, 3,456 hotel rooms, and 13,400 housing units.

The administrative core of Memphis and of Shelby County, Tennessee is also located in Downtown Memphis. These include the Memphis City Hall and the Federal Building, located on North Main Street, in the Civic Center Plaza (corner of Main Street and Washington). Downtown Memphis also contains the Memphis branch of the Federal Reserve Bank of St. Louis.

== Districts and neighborhoods ==
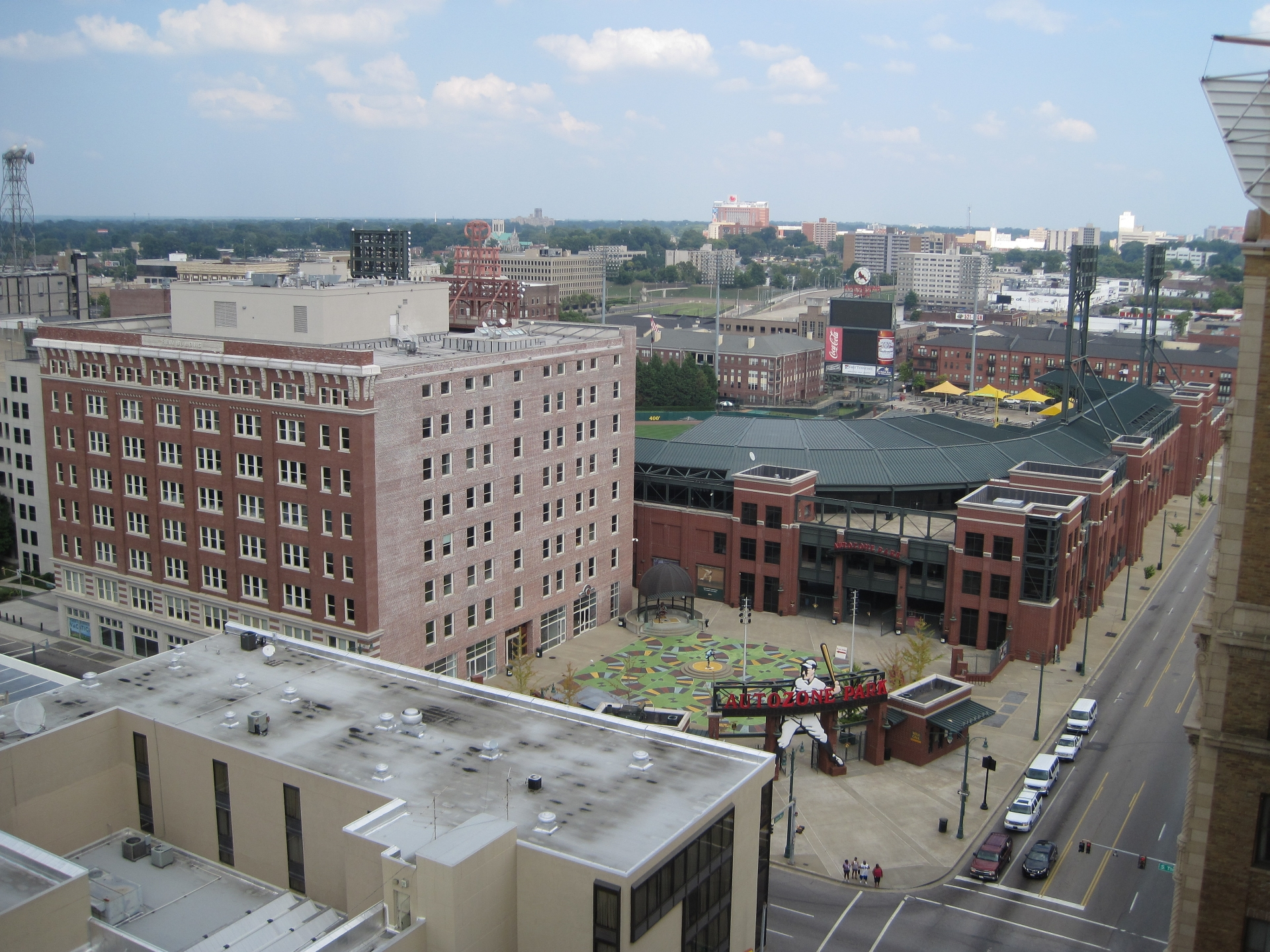
View from the Peabody Hotel, looking east over Autozone Park toward the Medical District.

=== Downtown Core ===
Downtown Core is the heart of the central business district and includes the majority of the office space, retail, entertainment, and dining spaces. It is a popular regional destination for entertainment, dining, and tourism and includes attractions such as Beale Street, FedExForum, AutoZone Park, and the Peabody Hotel.

=== Districts and neighborhoods ===
- South Main Arts District
- Medical District
- Pinch District
- Peabody Place
- Beale Street
- South Forum (SoFo)
- Uptown
- Greenlaw
- Harbor Town
- The Edge
- Victorian Village
- South Bluffs
- Fort Pickering

=== Memphis Riverfront ===
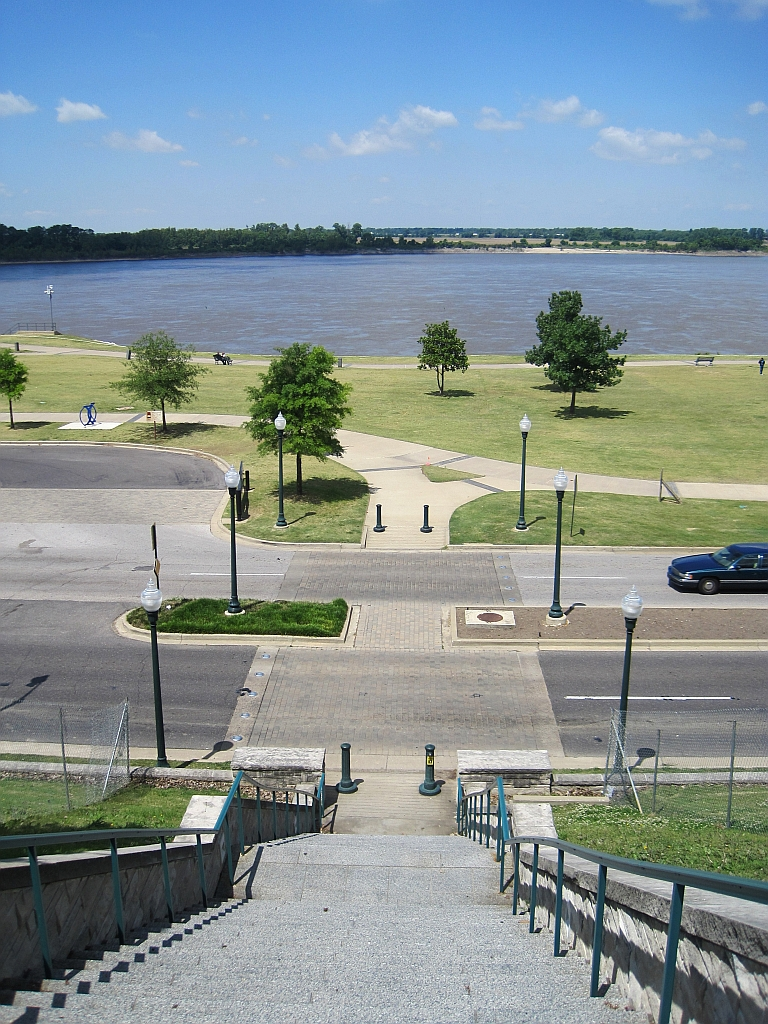
River Walk at Butler Park

Downtown Memphis is located on the banks of the Mississippi River. The Memphis Riverfront stretches from the Meeman-Shelby Forest State Park in the north to T. O. Fuller State Park in the south.

The River Walk is a park system along the Mississippi River that connects the Mississippi River Greenbelt Park in the north to Tom Lee Park in the south.

Points of interest along the riverfront include:

- Chickasaw Bluff at Beale Street Landing
- Riverfront Trolley
- Mud Island
- Harbor Town
- Pinch District
- Steamboats
- Ashburn-Coppock Park
- President's Island
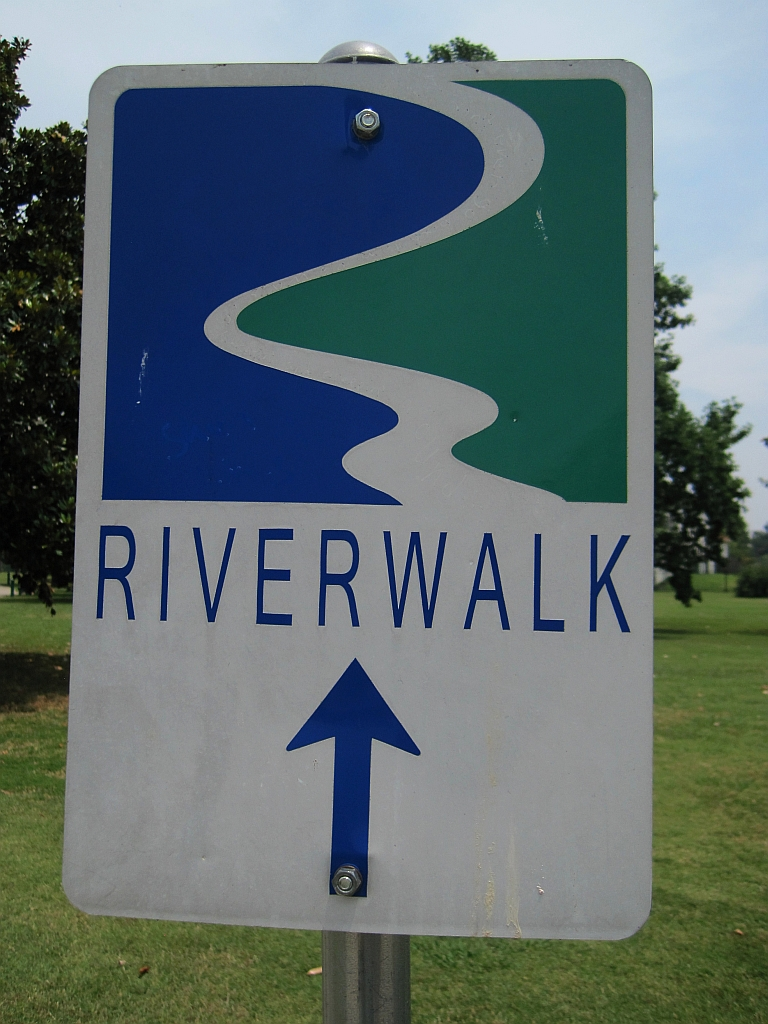
Memphis River Walk

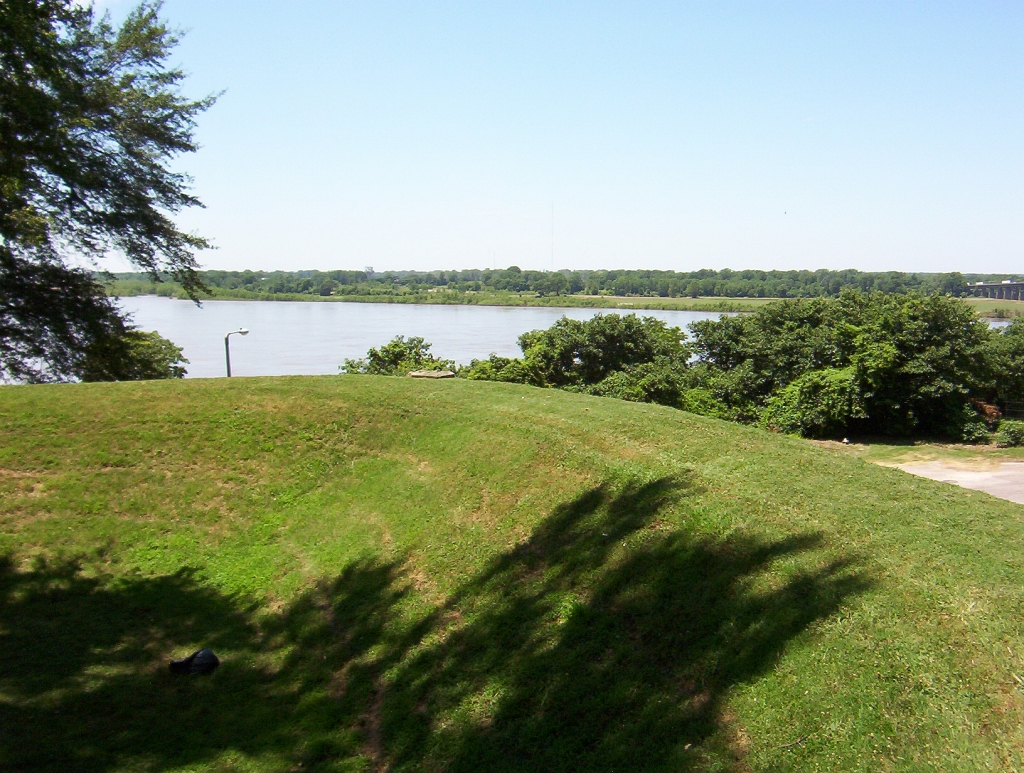
4th Bluff Mounds at Chickasaw Heritage Park

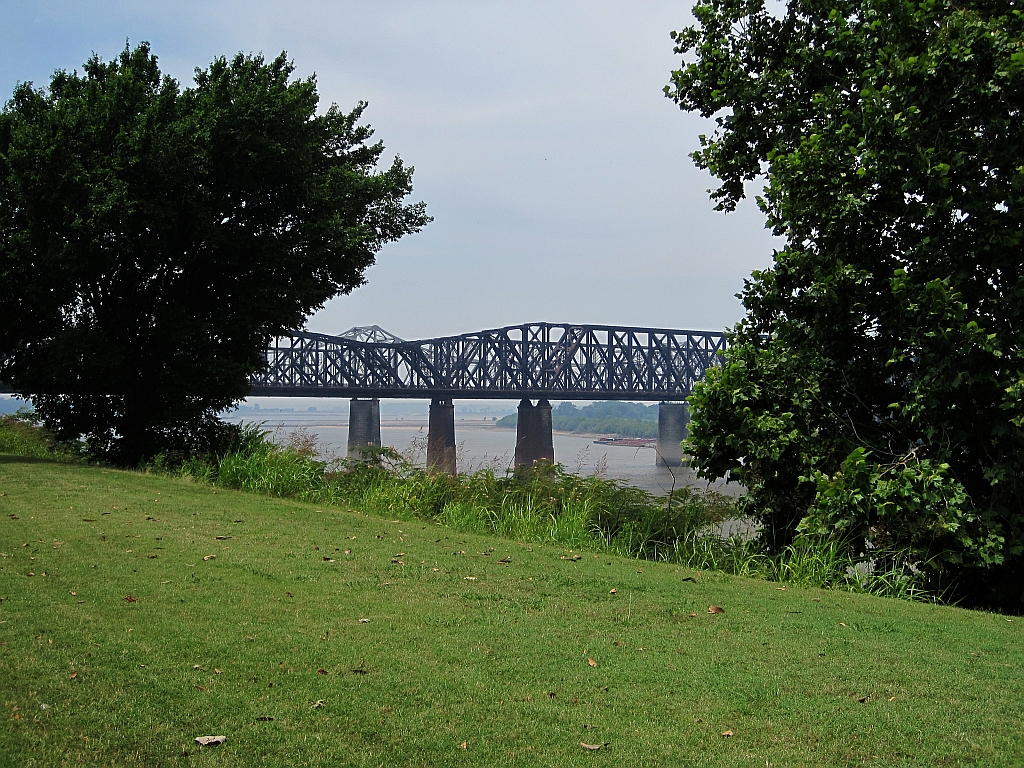
Harahan Bridge from Martyrs Park

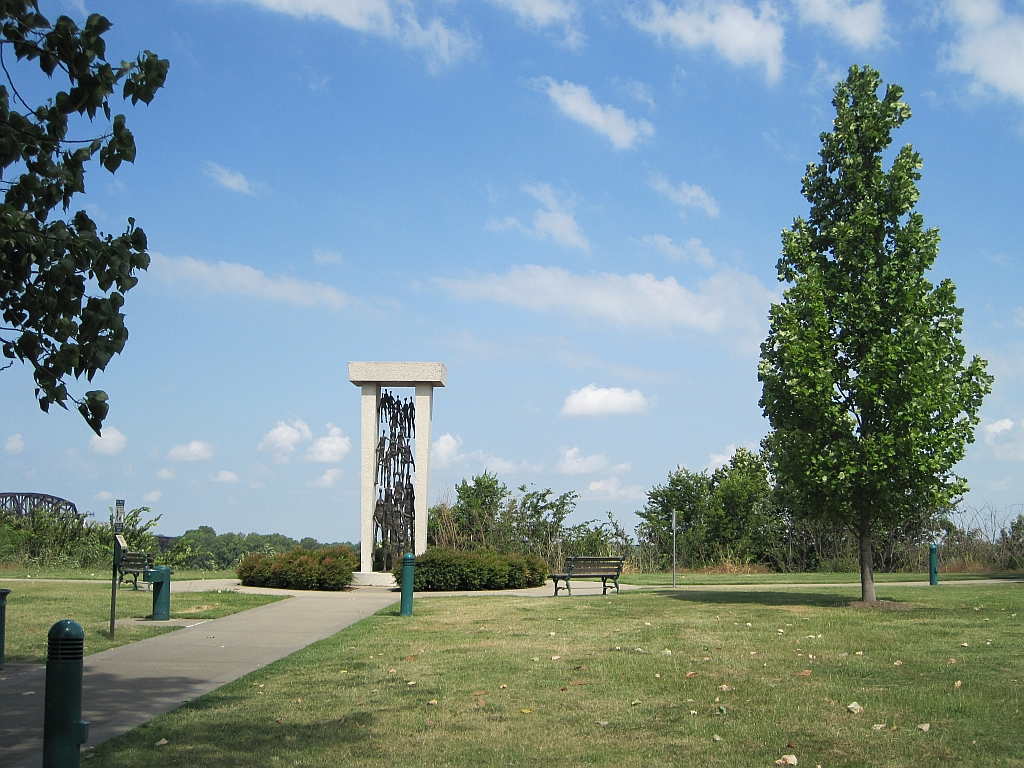
Yellow Fever Memorial in Martyrs Park

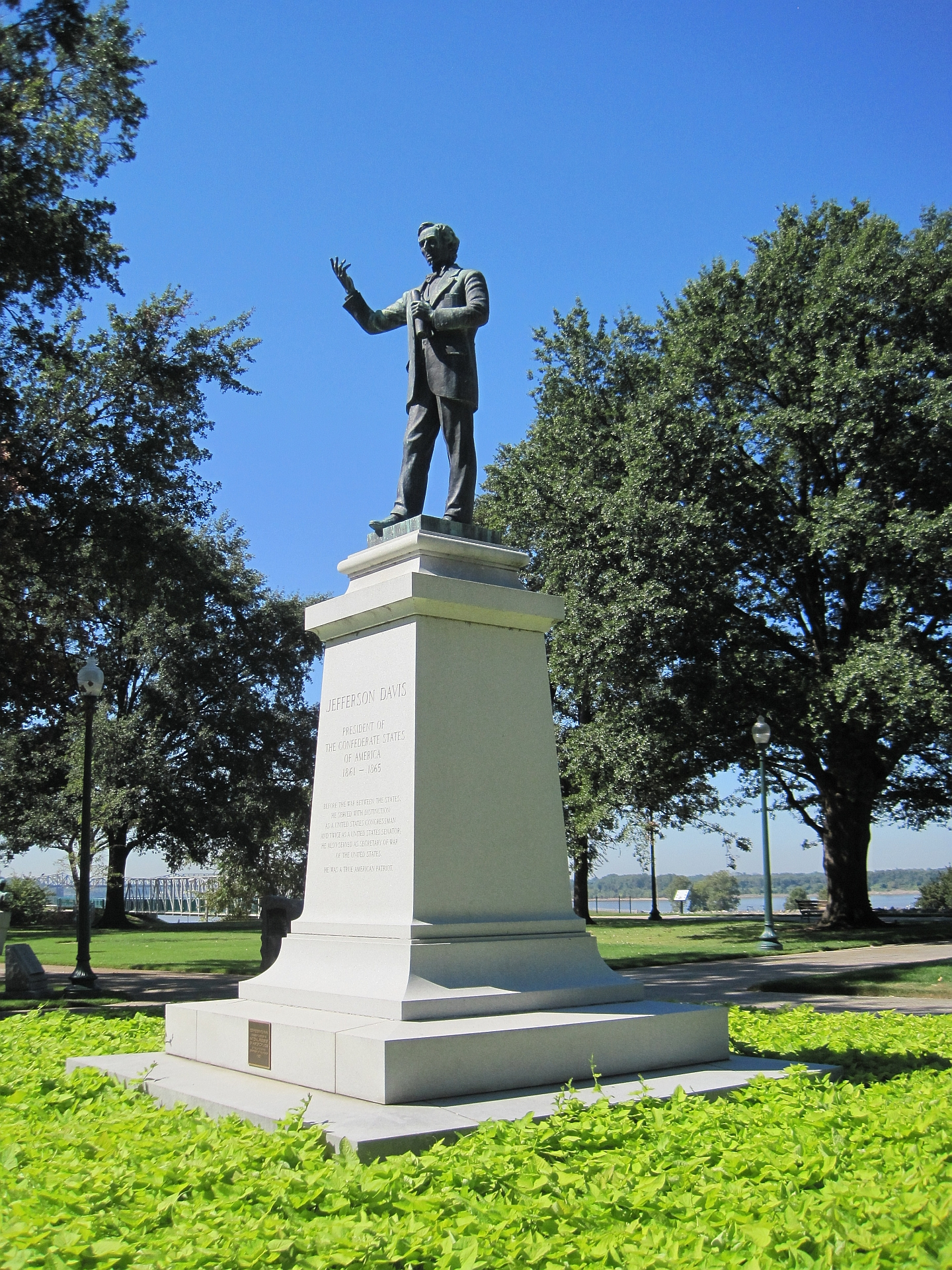
Memphis Park

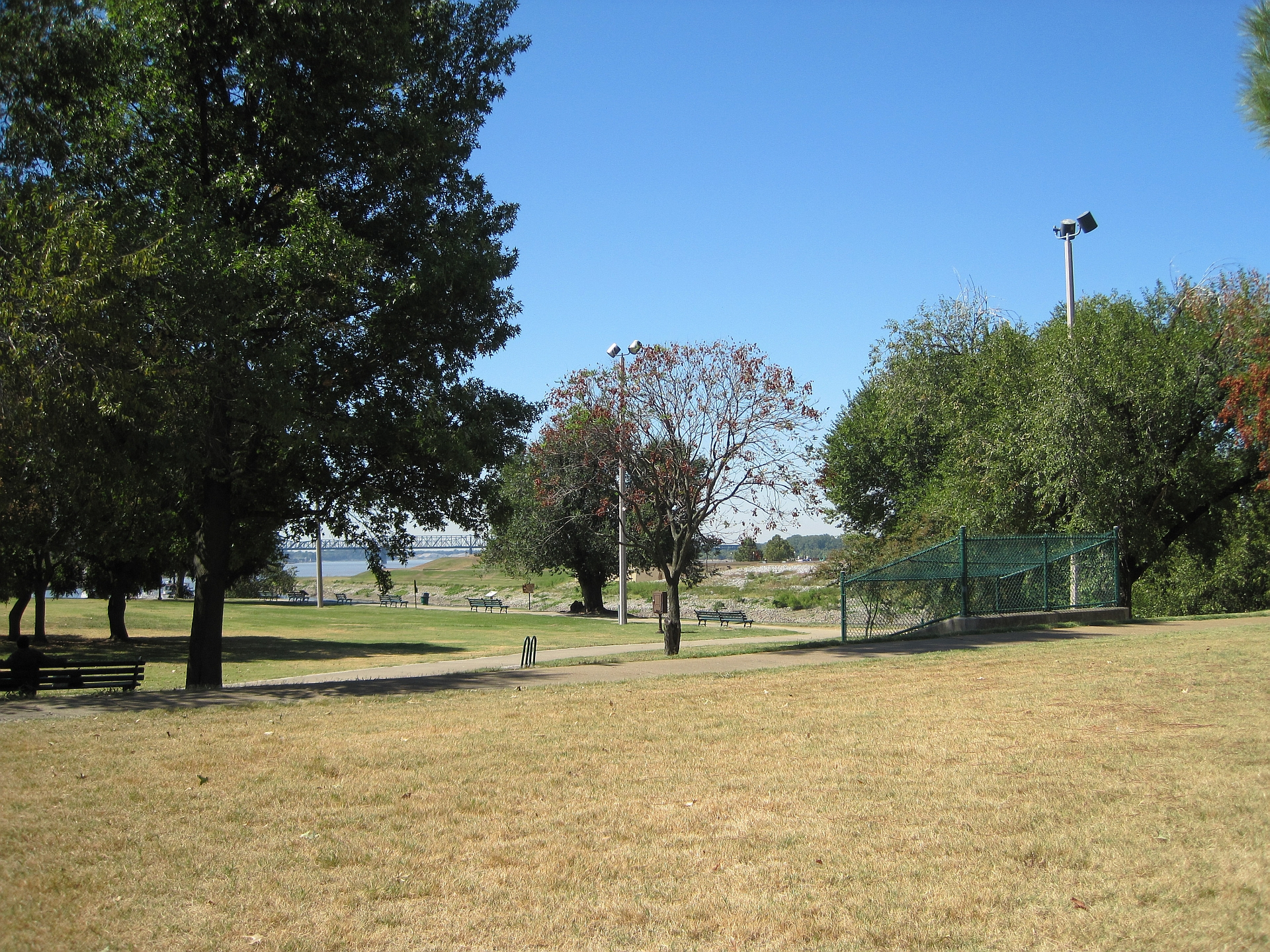
Mississippi River Park

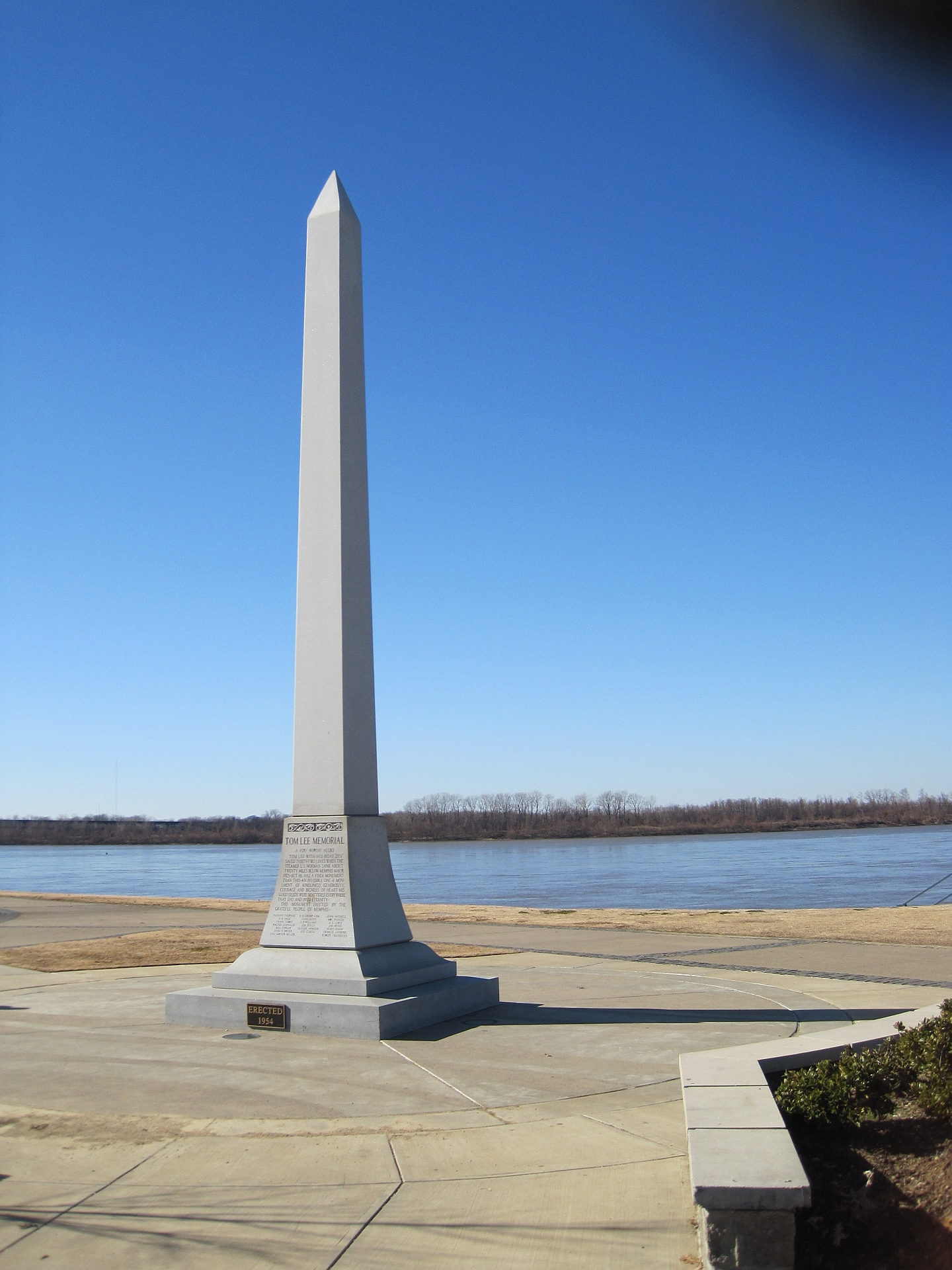
Tom Lee Park

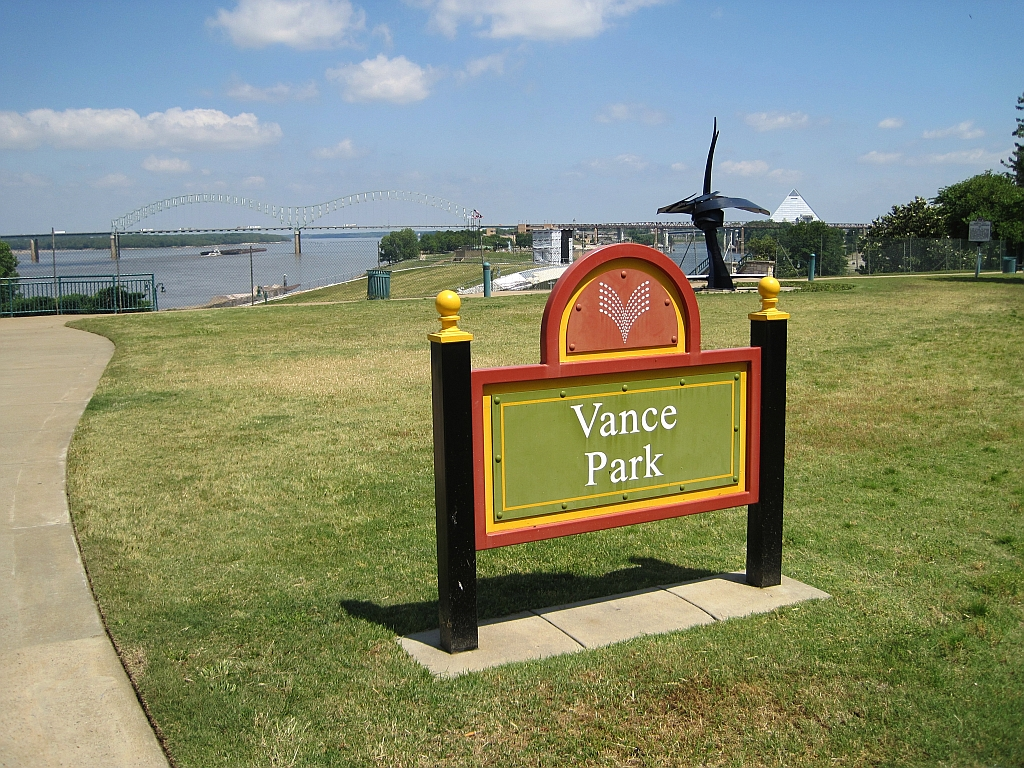
Vance Park

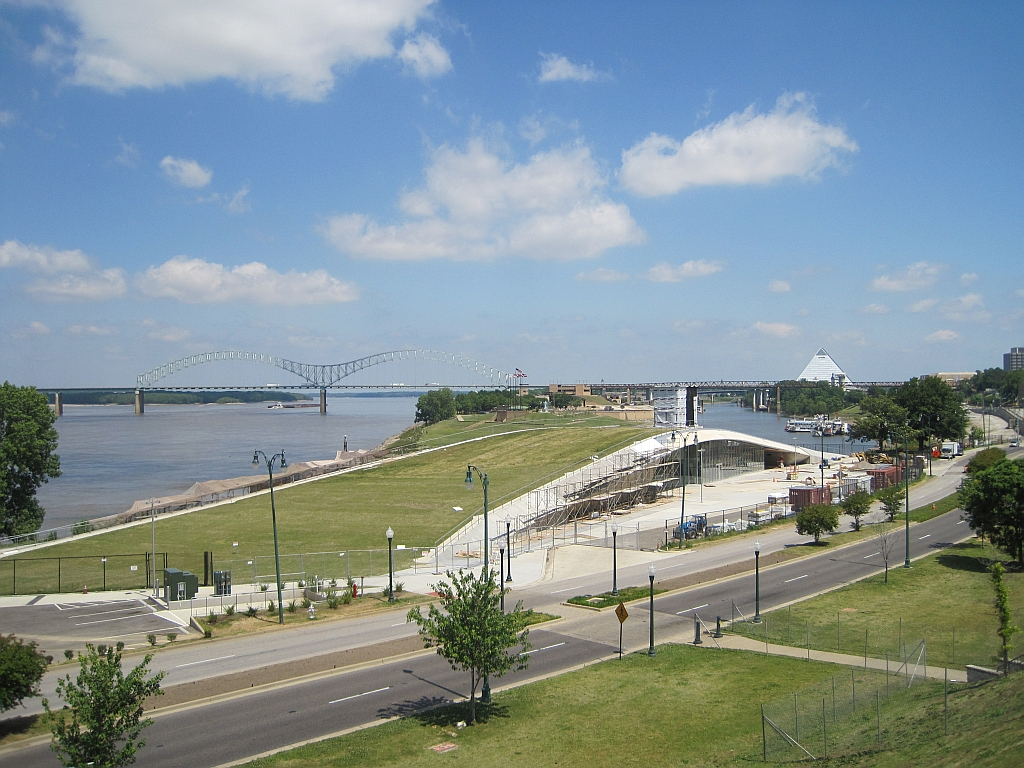
Beale Street Landing

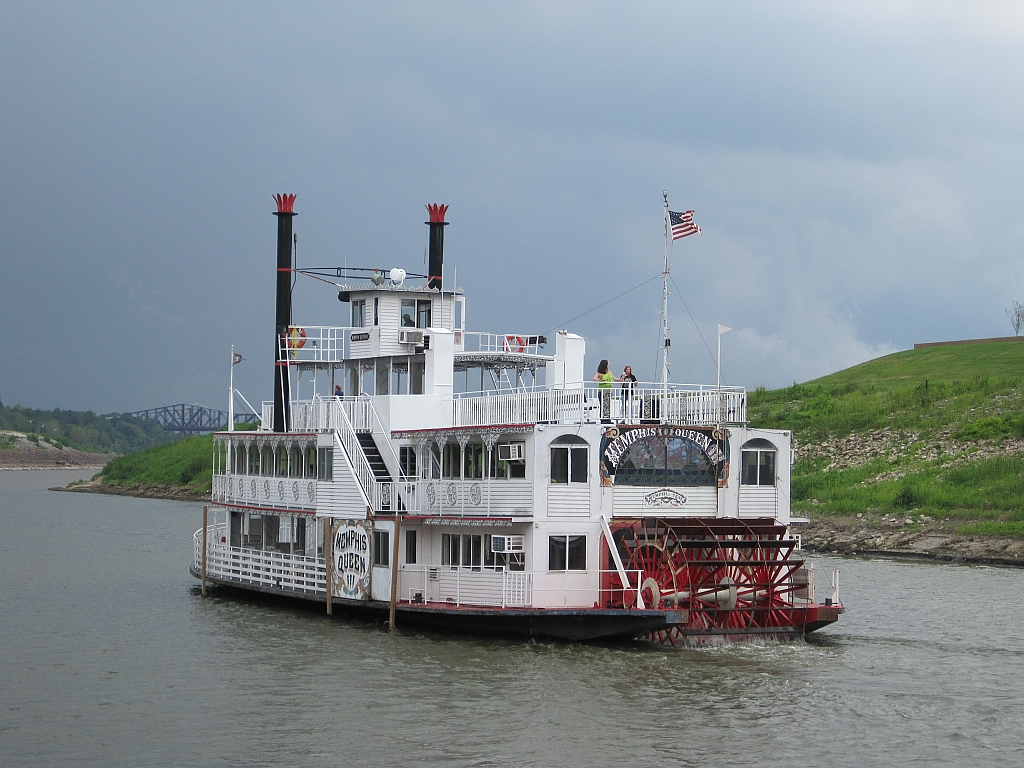
Memphis Queen

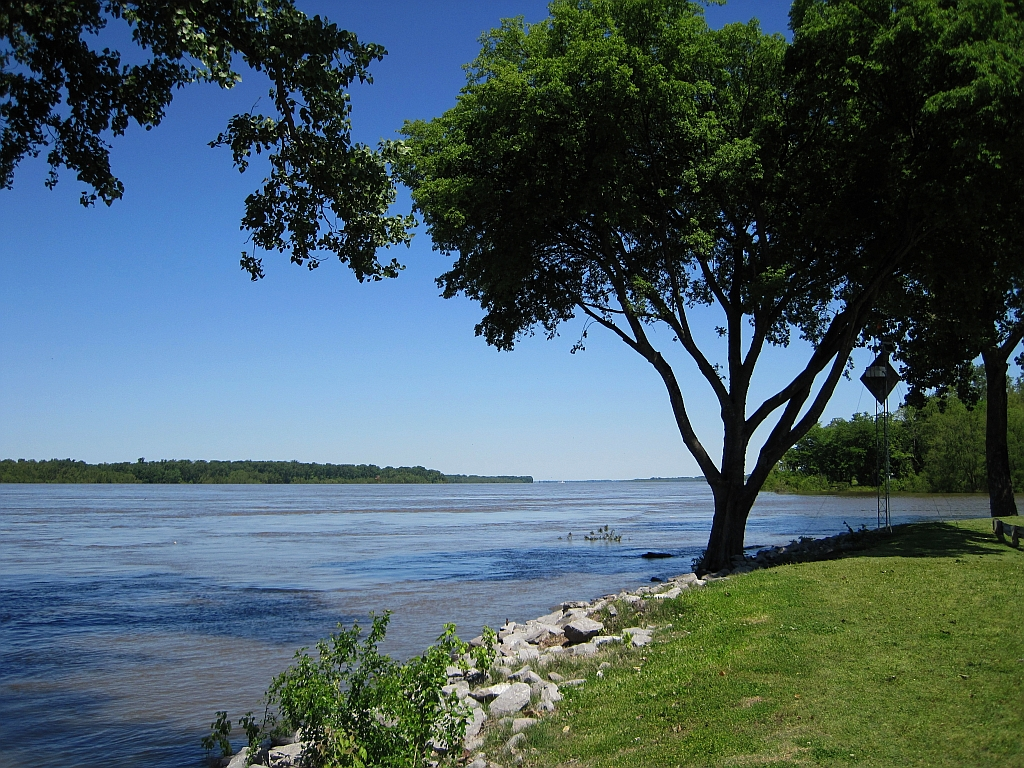
Mississippi River Greenbelt Park

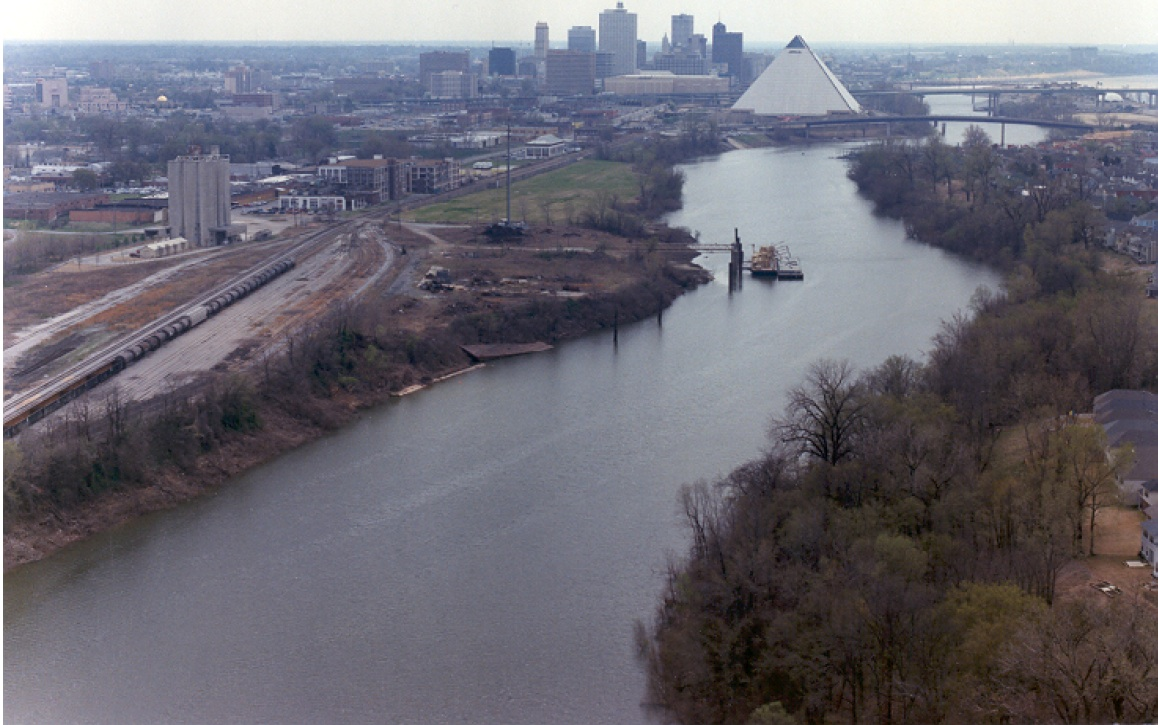
Wolf River Harbor

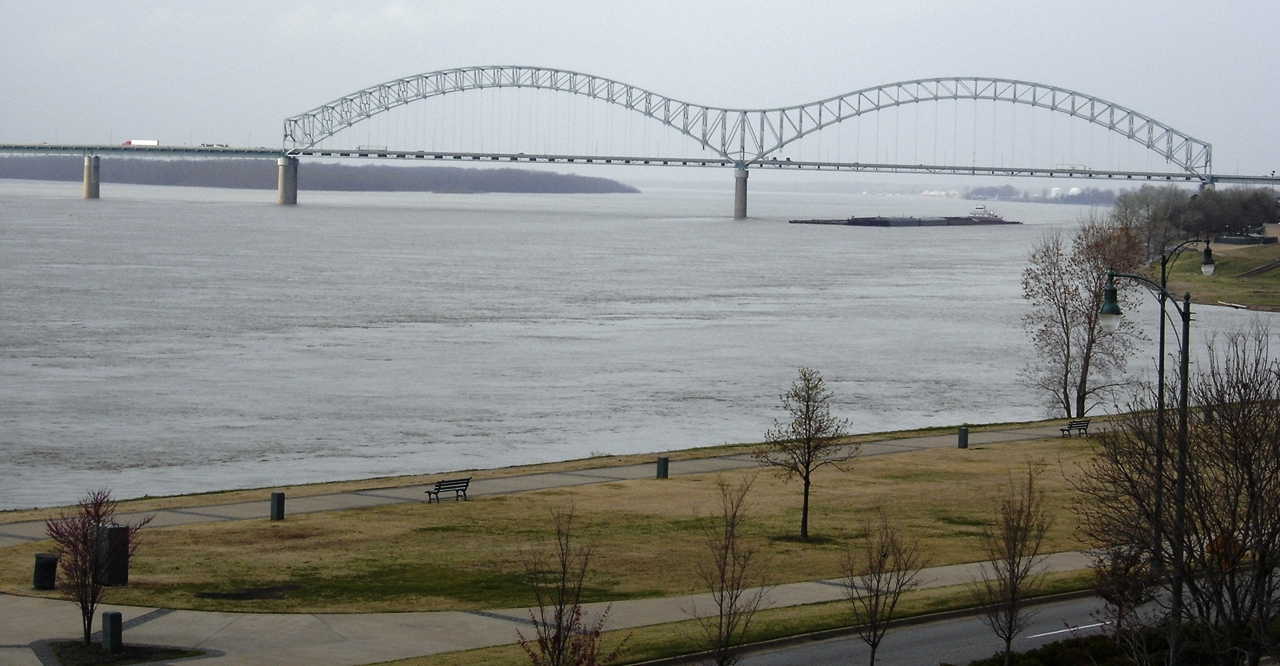
Hernando de Soto Bridge

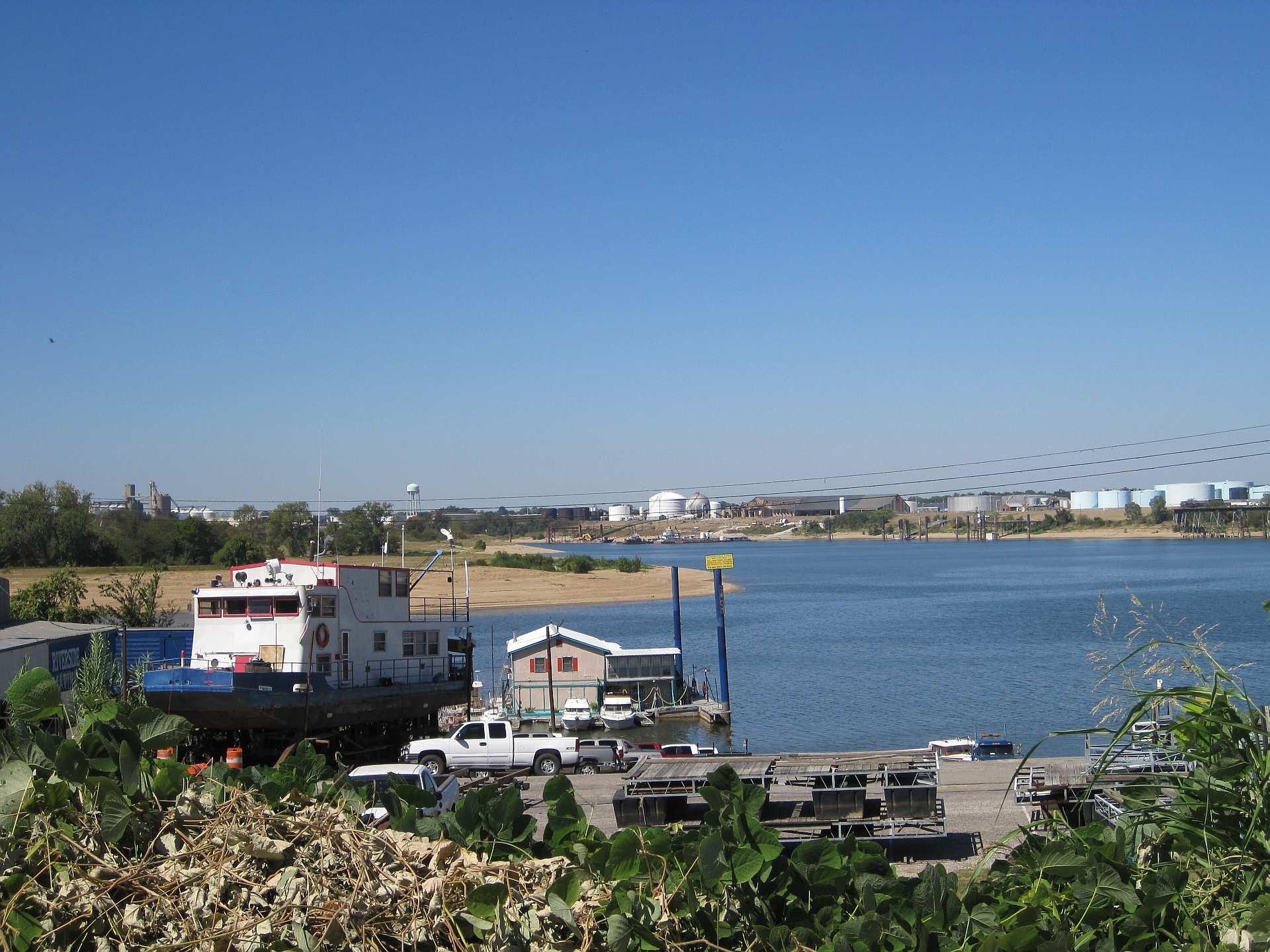
McKellar Lake

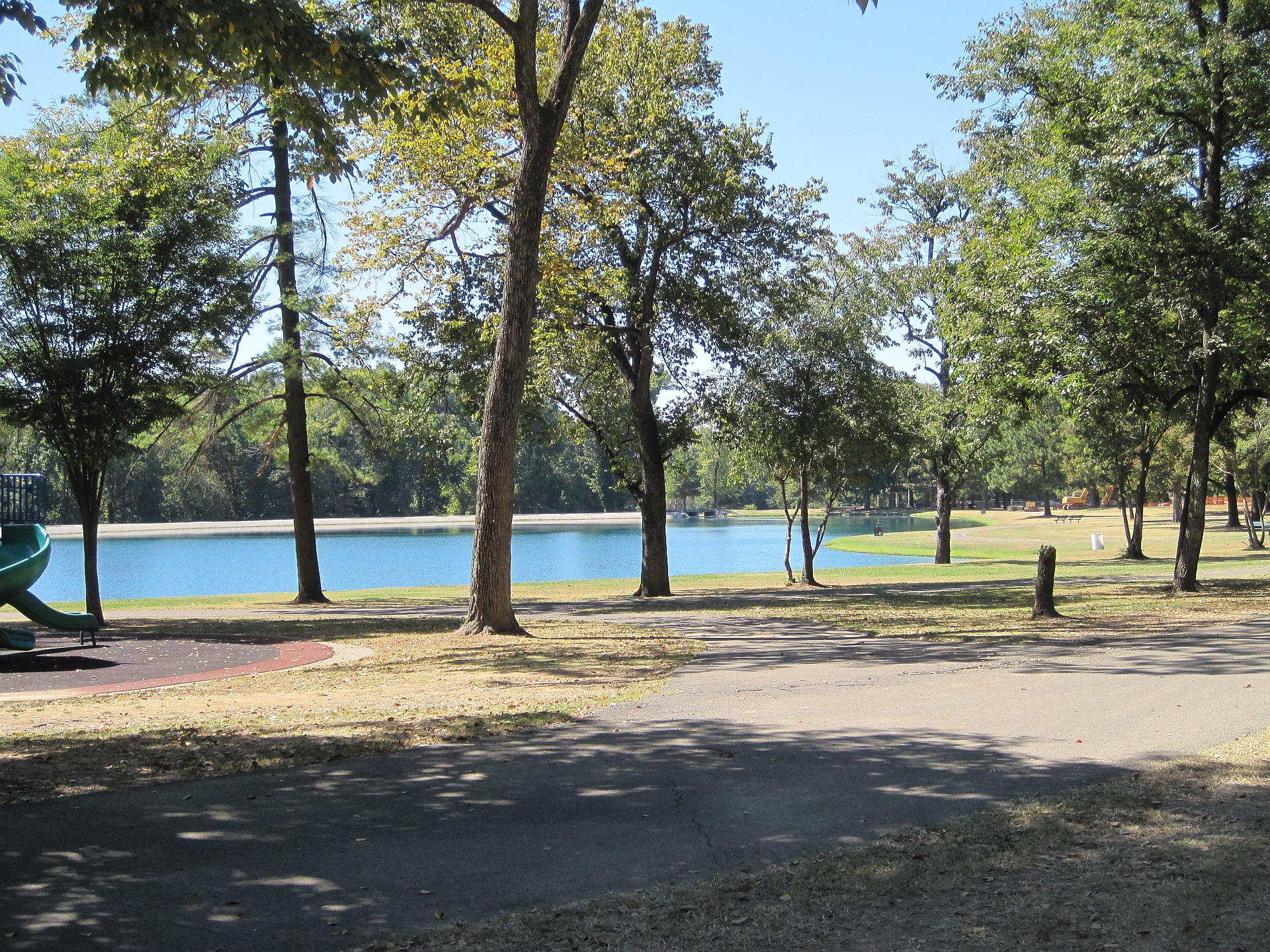
Martin Luther King Jr Park

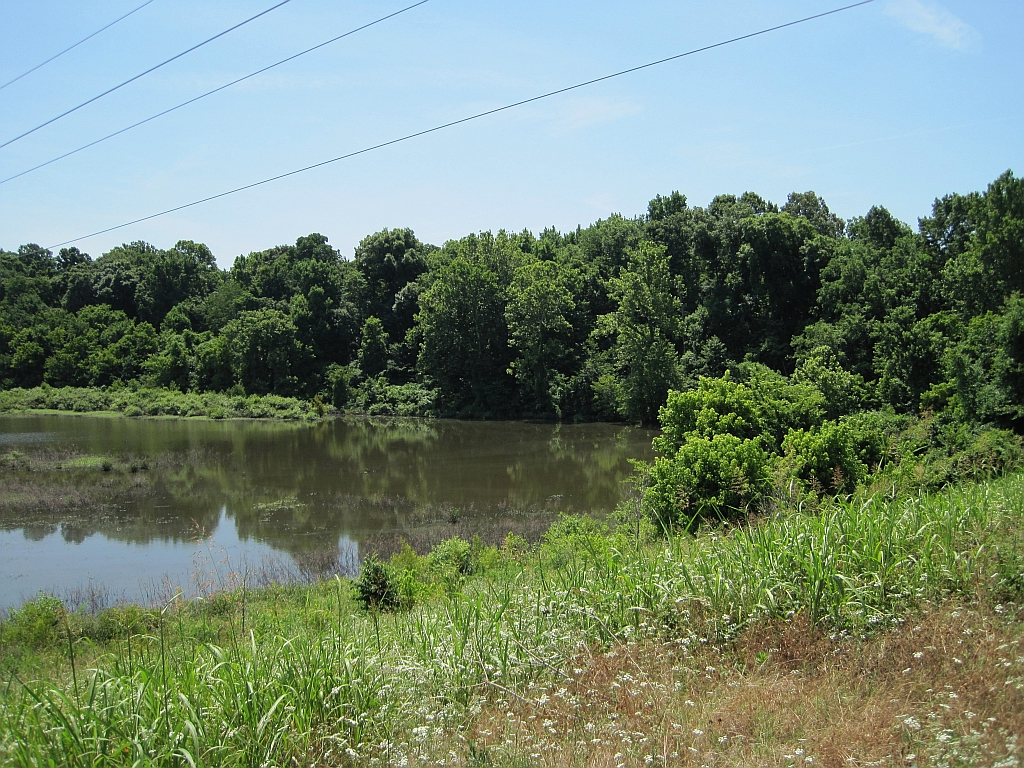
T. O. Fuller State Park

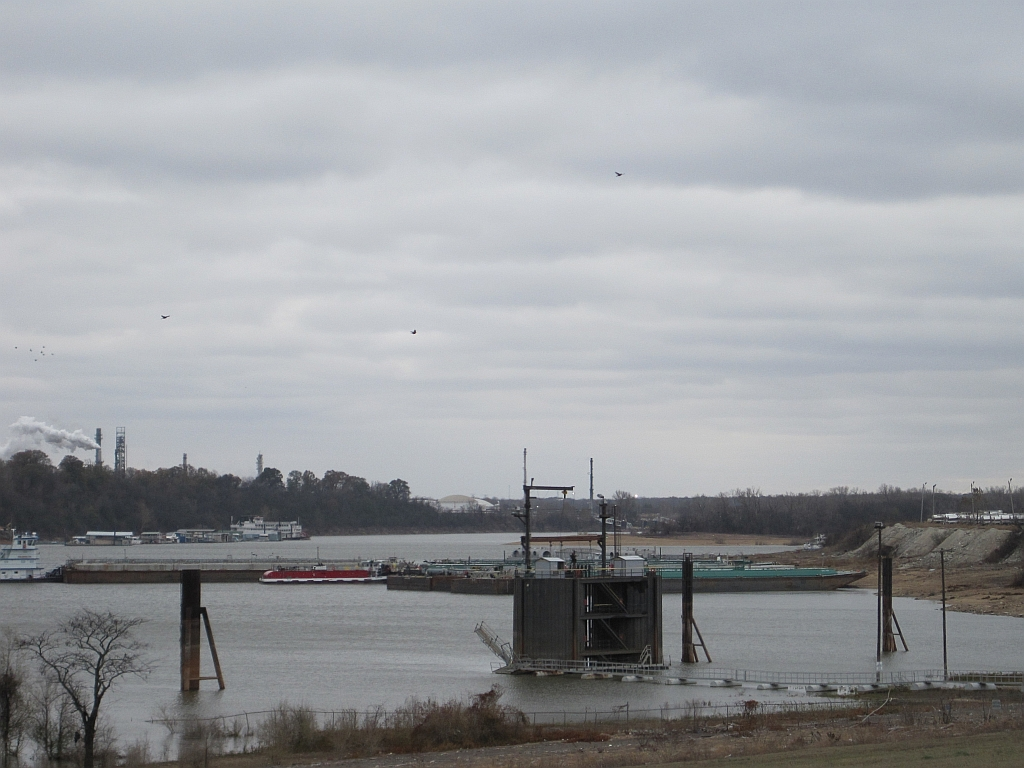
President's Island

== Economy ==
Companies headquartered in Downtown Memphis include:

- AutoZone
- First Horizon
- Southern Airways Express (One Commerce Square)
- ServiceMaster (Peabody Place)

Downtown Memphis is also the former headquarters of Pinnacle Airlines Corp. (One Commerce Square).

== Schools ==
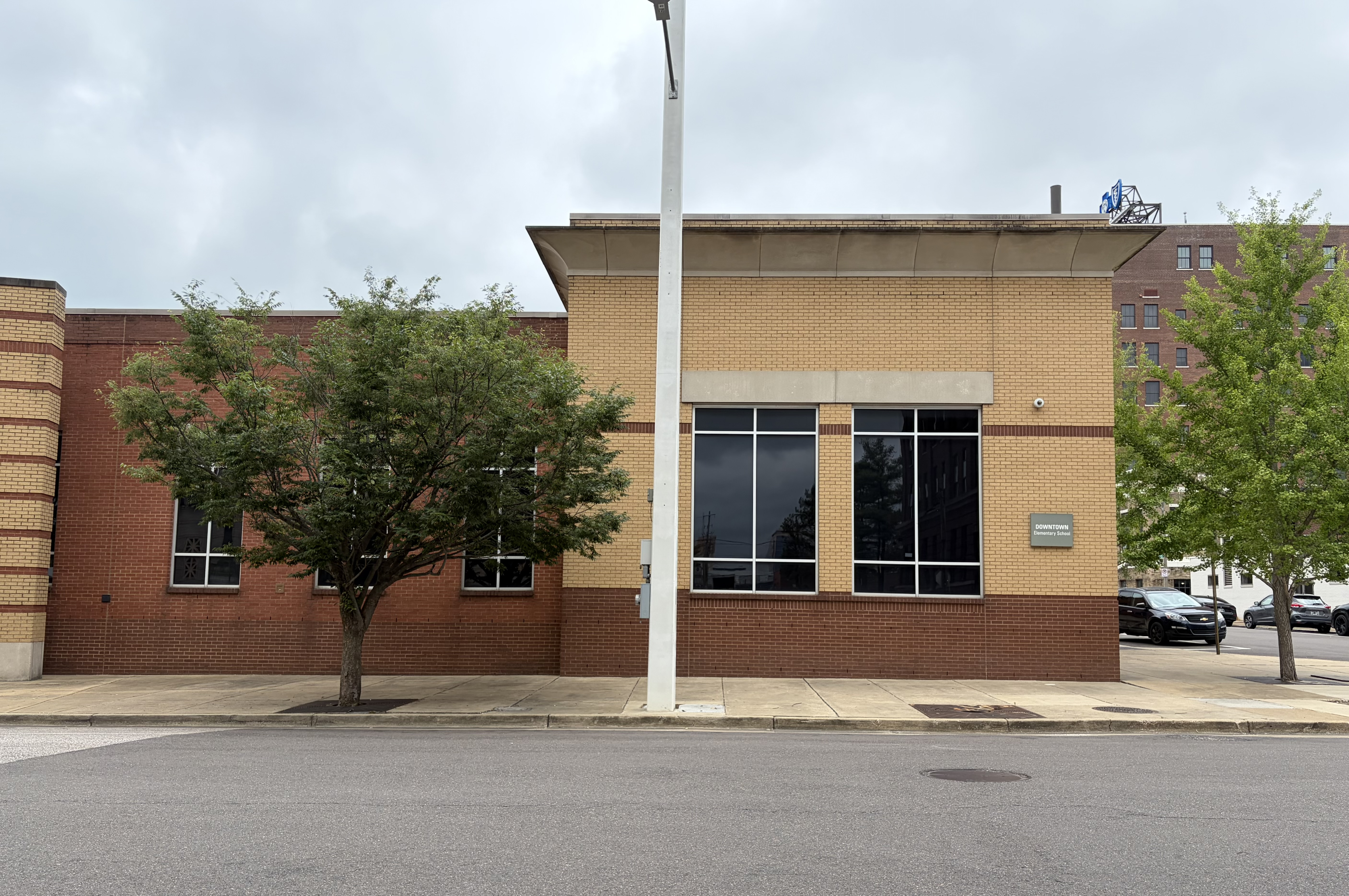
Downtown Elementary School

Downtown Memphis is zoned to the following Shelby County Schools (formerly Memphis City Schools) campuses:

- Downtown Elementary School
- Vance Middle School
- Booker T. Washington High School

== Transportation ==
Downtown is served by major highways and interstates, public bus and trolley service by MATA, and passenger train service by Amtrak.

Interstates I-40, I-55, I-69 and I-240 all run directly through Downtown, providing direct access to the area from adjacent areas as well as the region as a whole. The new Interstate 22 is about 10 miles away from Downtown. Downtown also serves as the western terminus of U.S. Route 78 as well as U.S. Route 72, and is directly located along U.S. Route 51, U.S. Route 61, U.S. Route 64, U.S. Route 70, and U.S. Route 79.

MATA operates the William Hudson Transit Center, its primary hub for Memphis public bus service, at the corner of Main Street and A.W. Willis Avenue. The majority of fixed bus routes operated by MATA terminate at William Hudson, therefore bus accessibility in the area is very high.

The MATA Trolley is a heritage streetcar system that operates three lines in Downtown along Main Street, Riverside Drive, and Madison Avenue. These three lines serve twenty-four stations and, in 2021, had a daily ridership of approximately 650. Connections between MATA public bus and Main Street trolley line can be made at William Hudson Transit Center.

Amtrak's City of New Orleans passenger train runs through Downtown Memphis three days a week, stopping at Central Station.

== Gallery ==
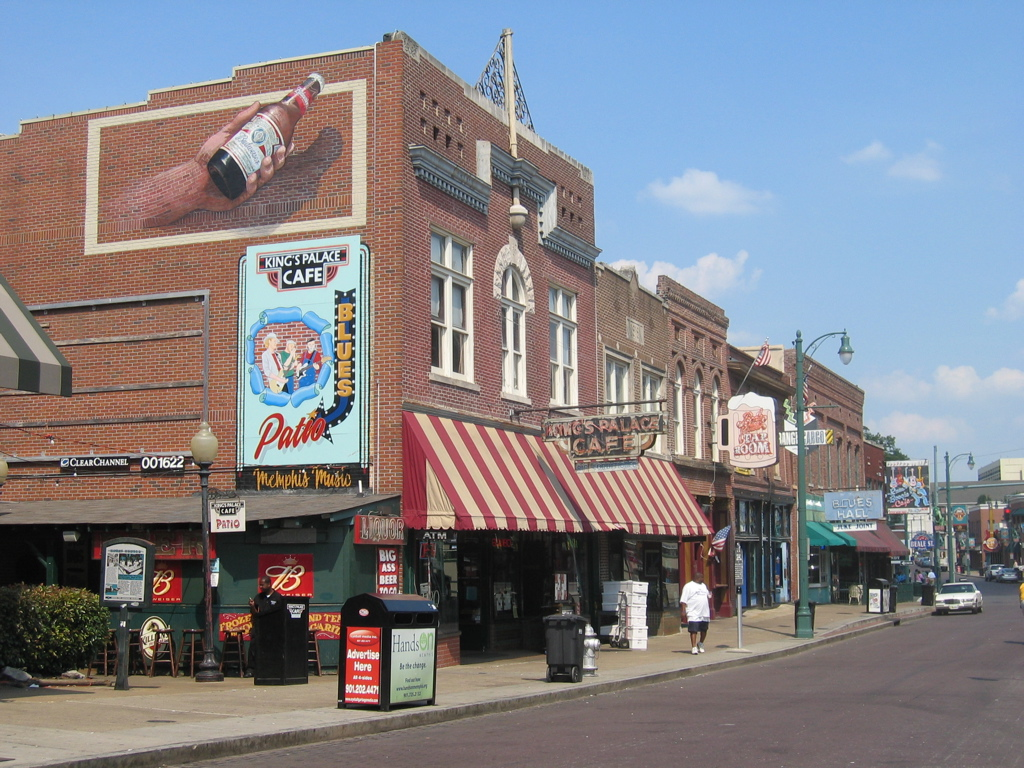
Beale Street

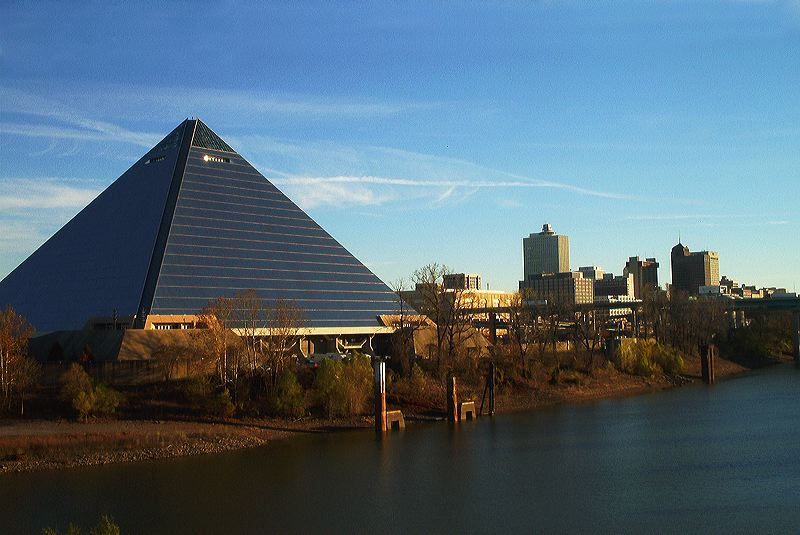
Pyramid Arena

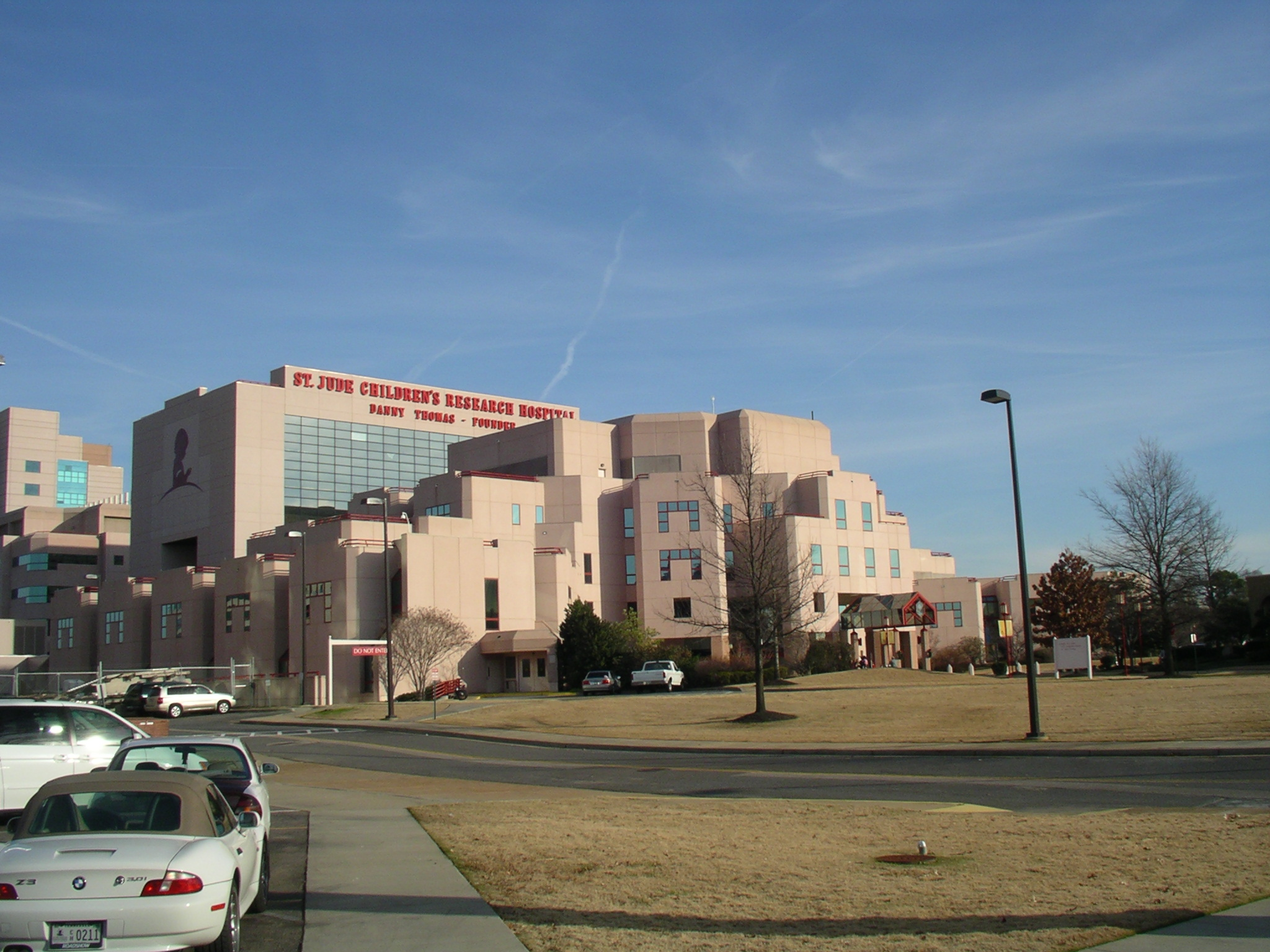
St. Jude Children's Research Hospital

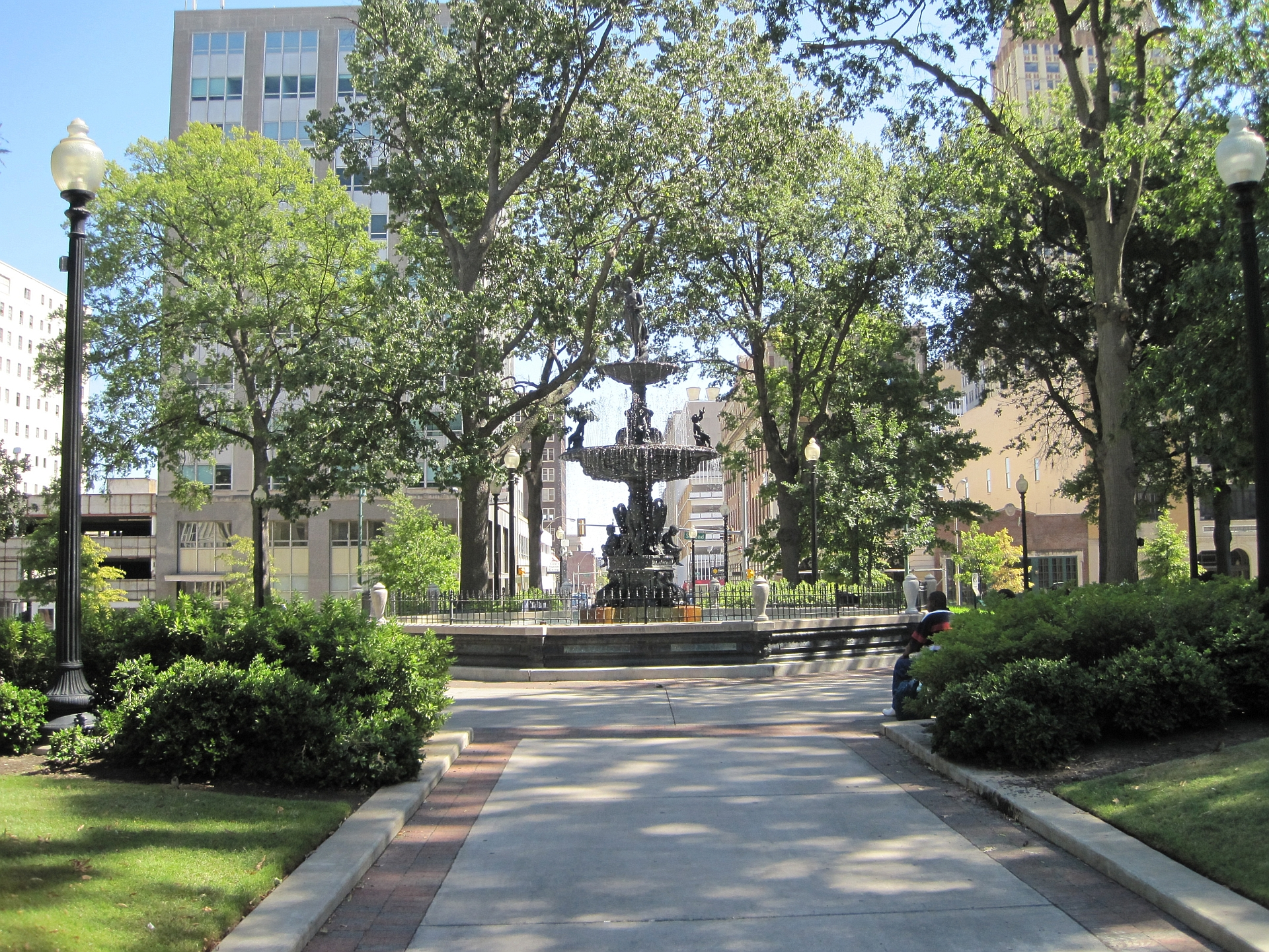
Court Square

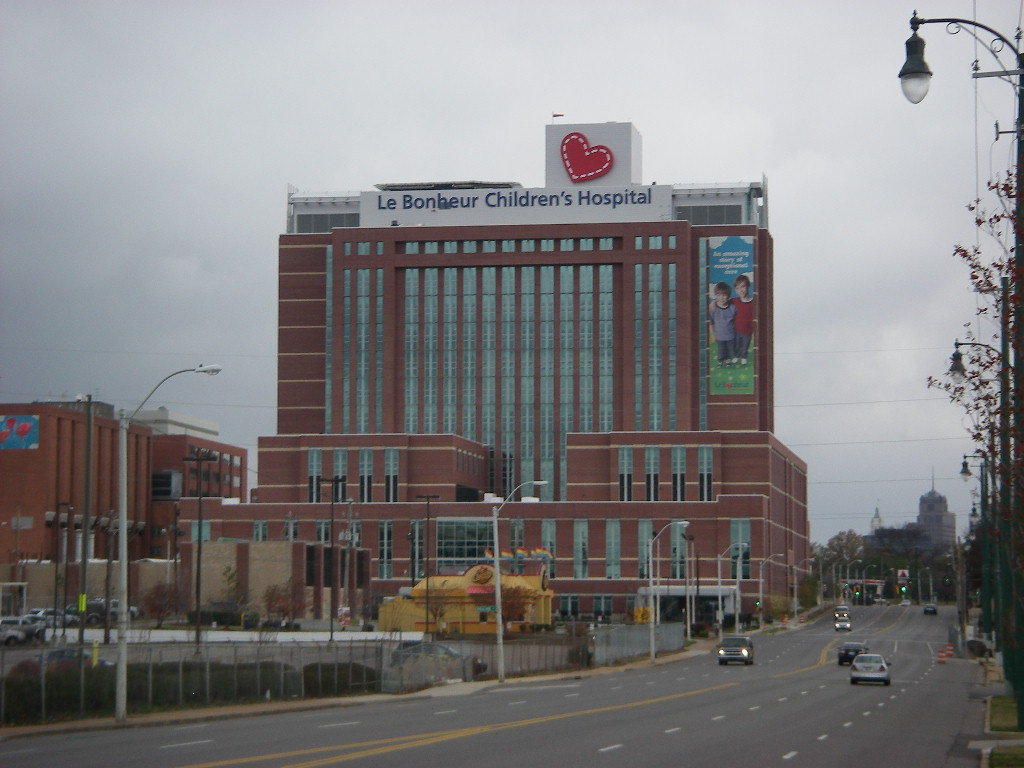
Le Bonheur Children's Medical Center

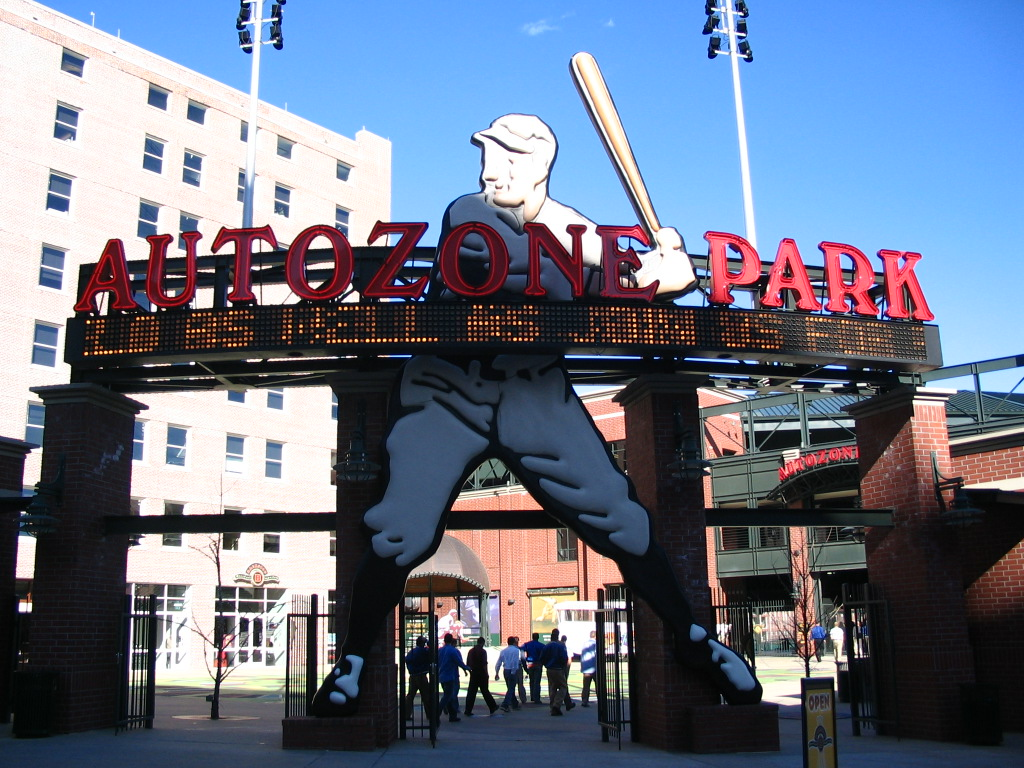
AutoZone Park

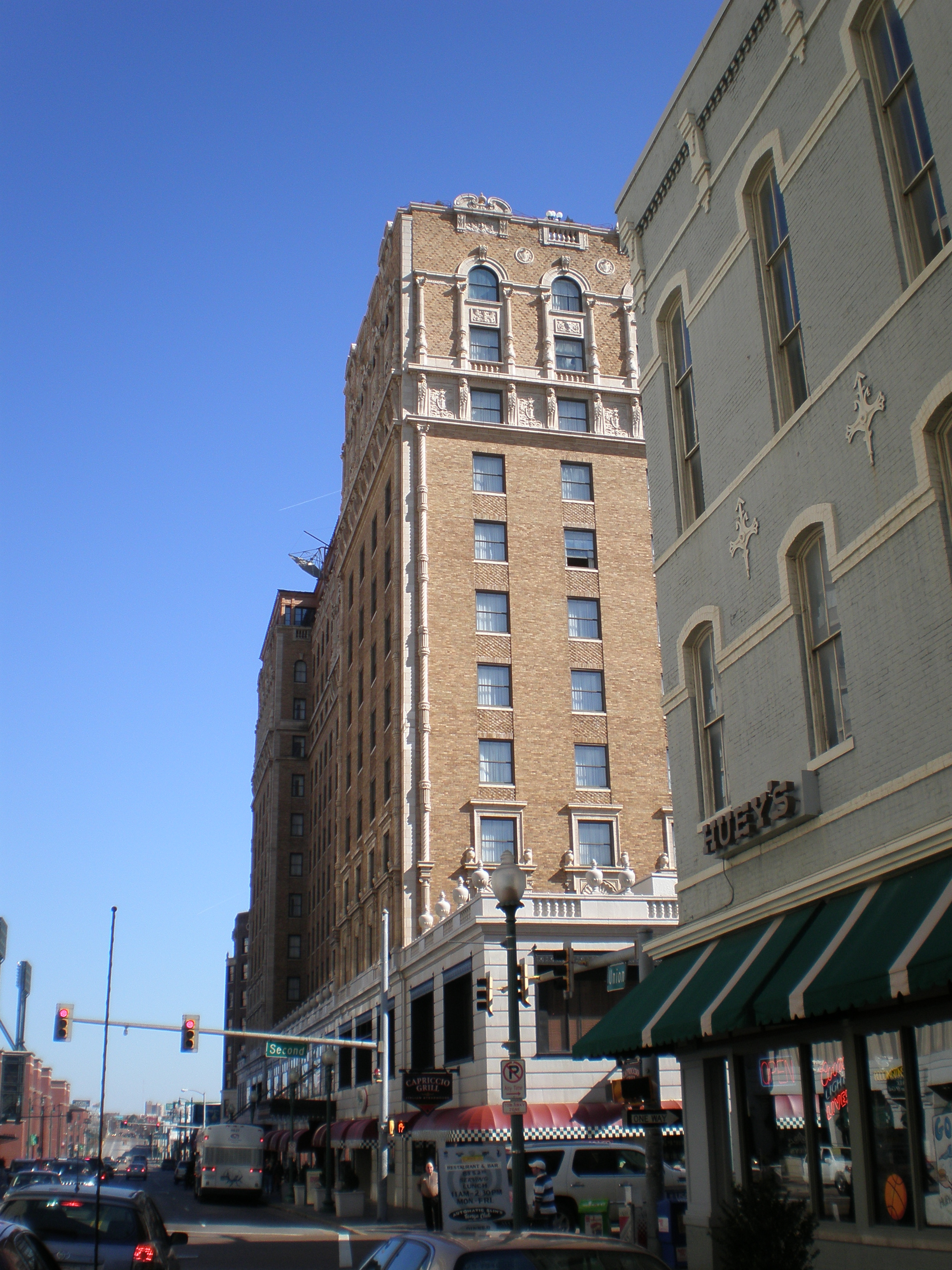
Peabody Hotel

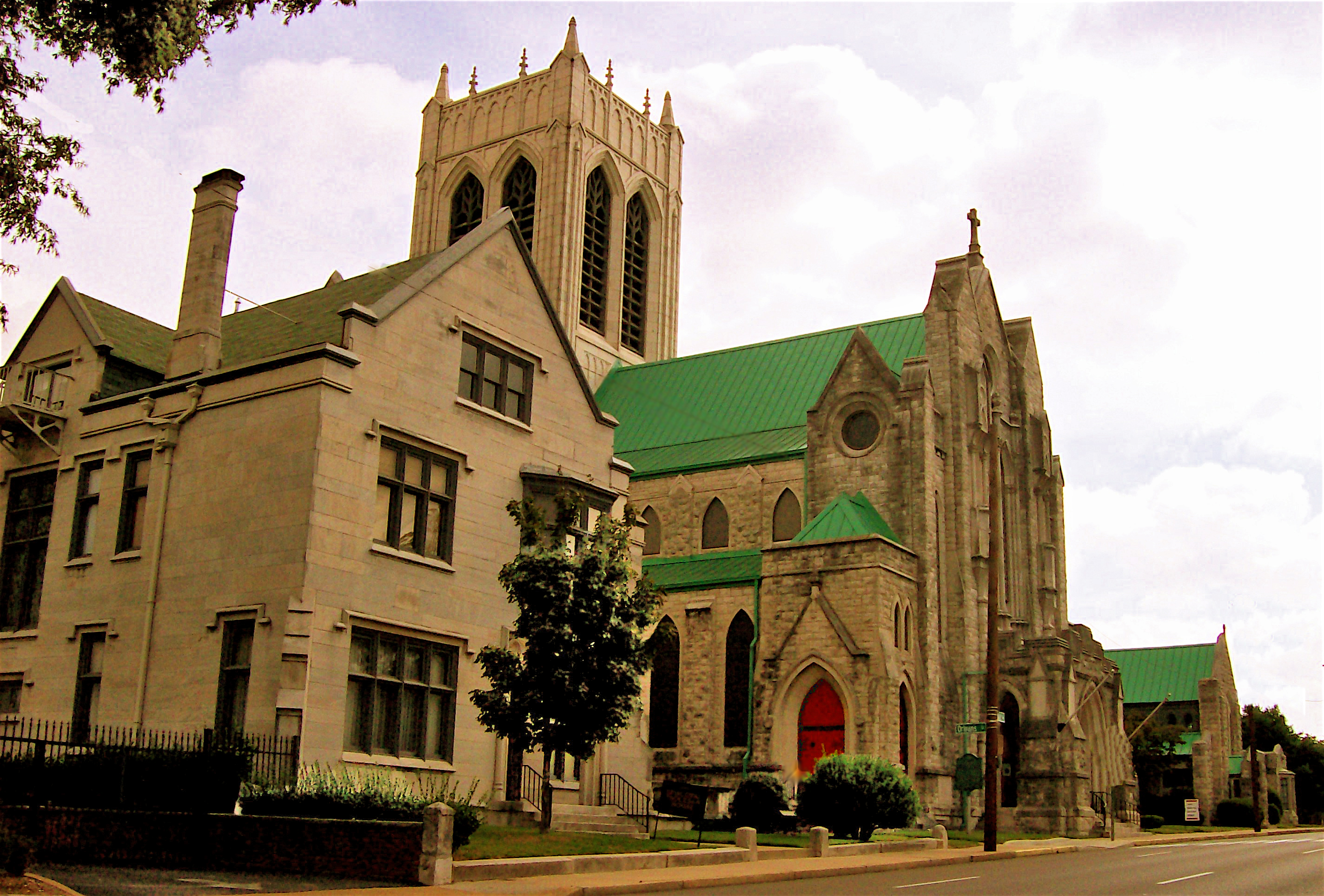
St. Mary's Episcopal Cathedral in Memphis

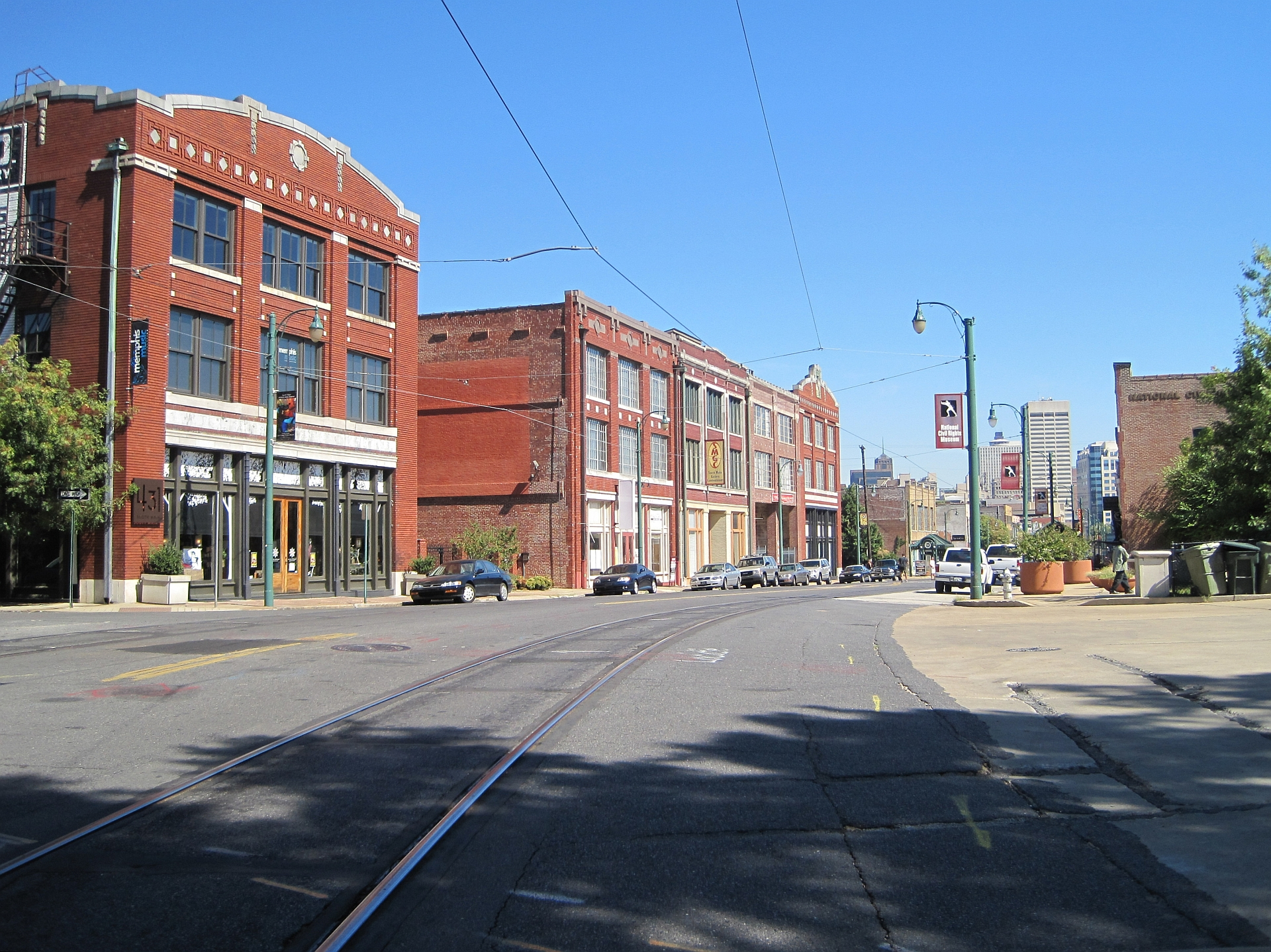
South Main Arts District

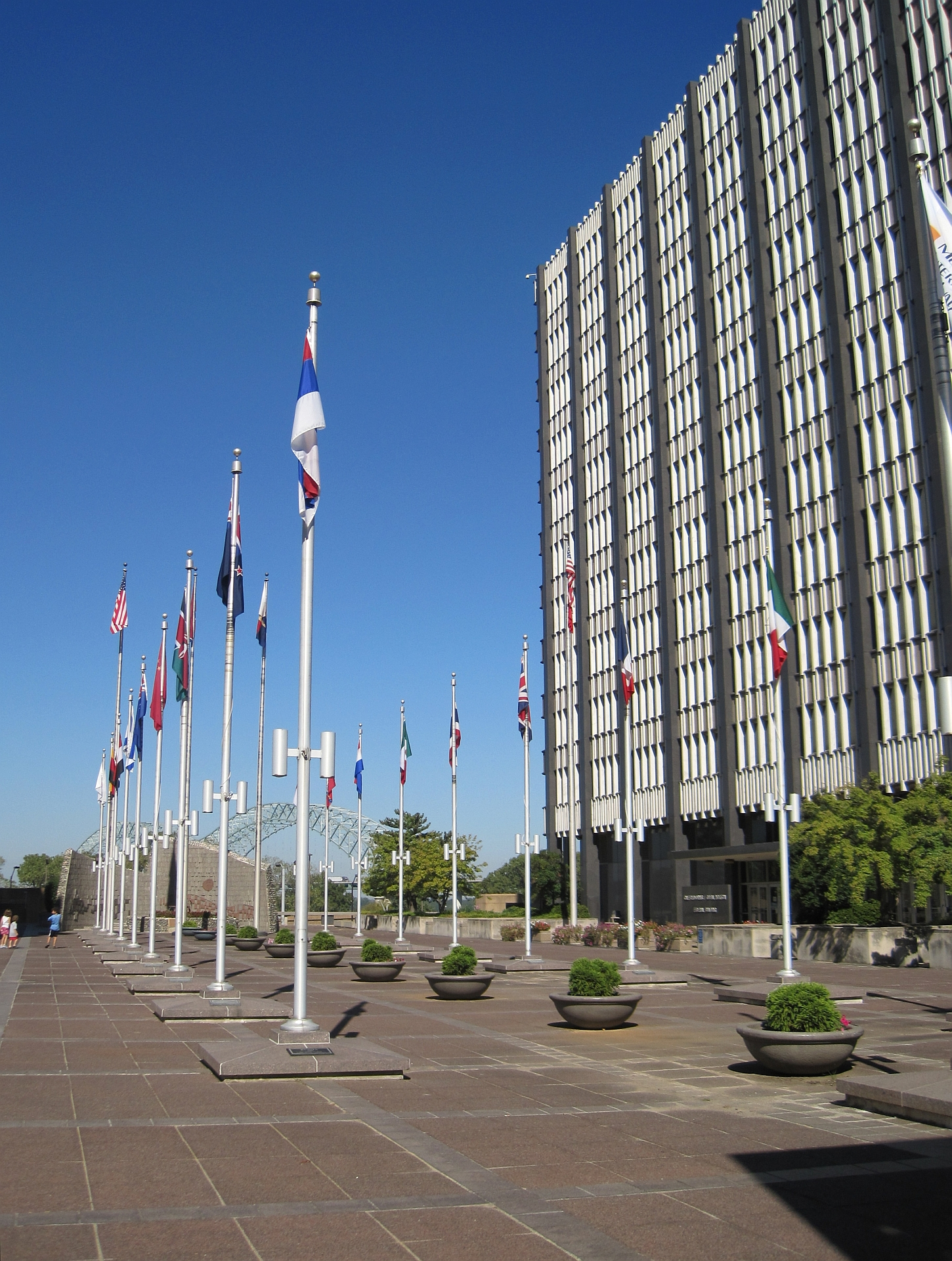
Civic Center Plaza

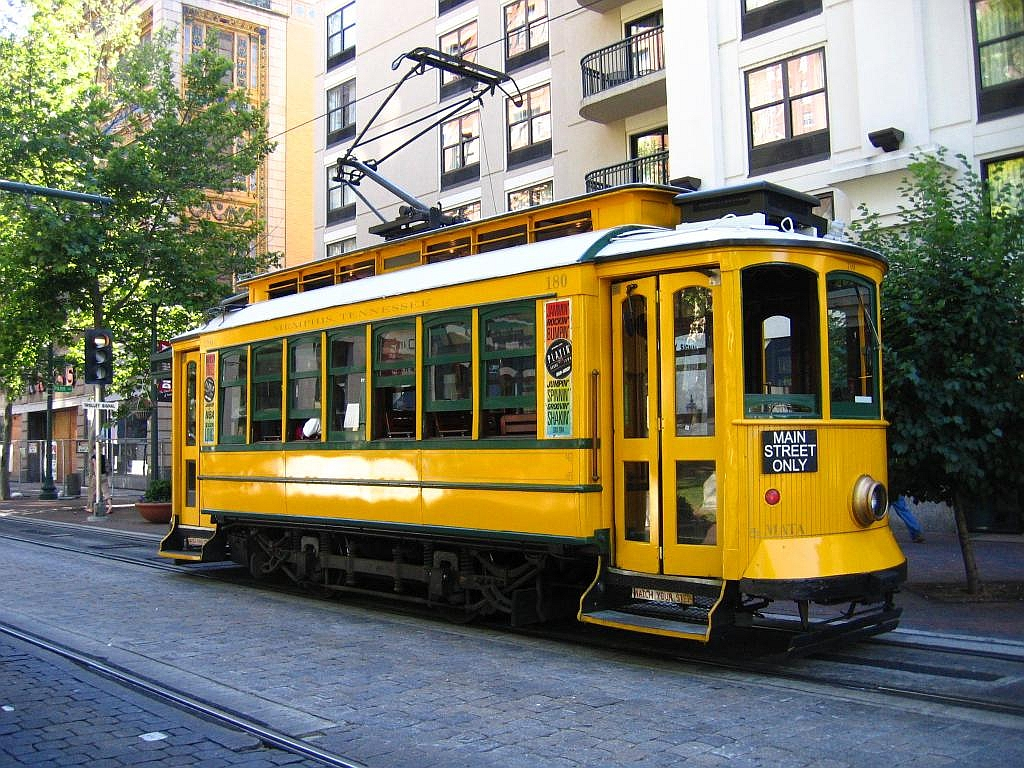
MATA Trolley on Main Street.

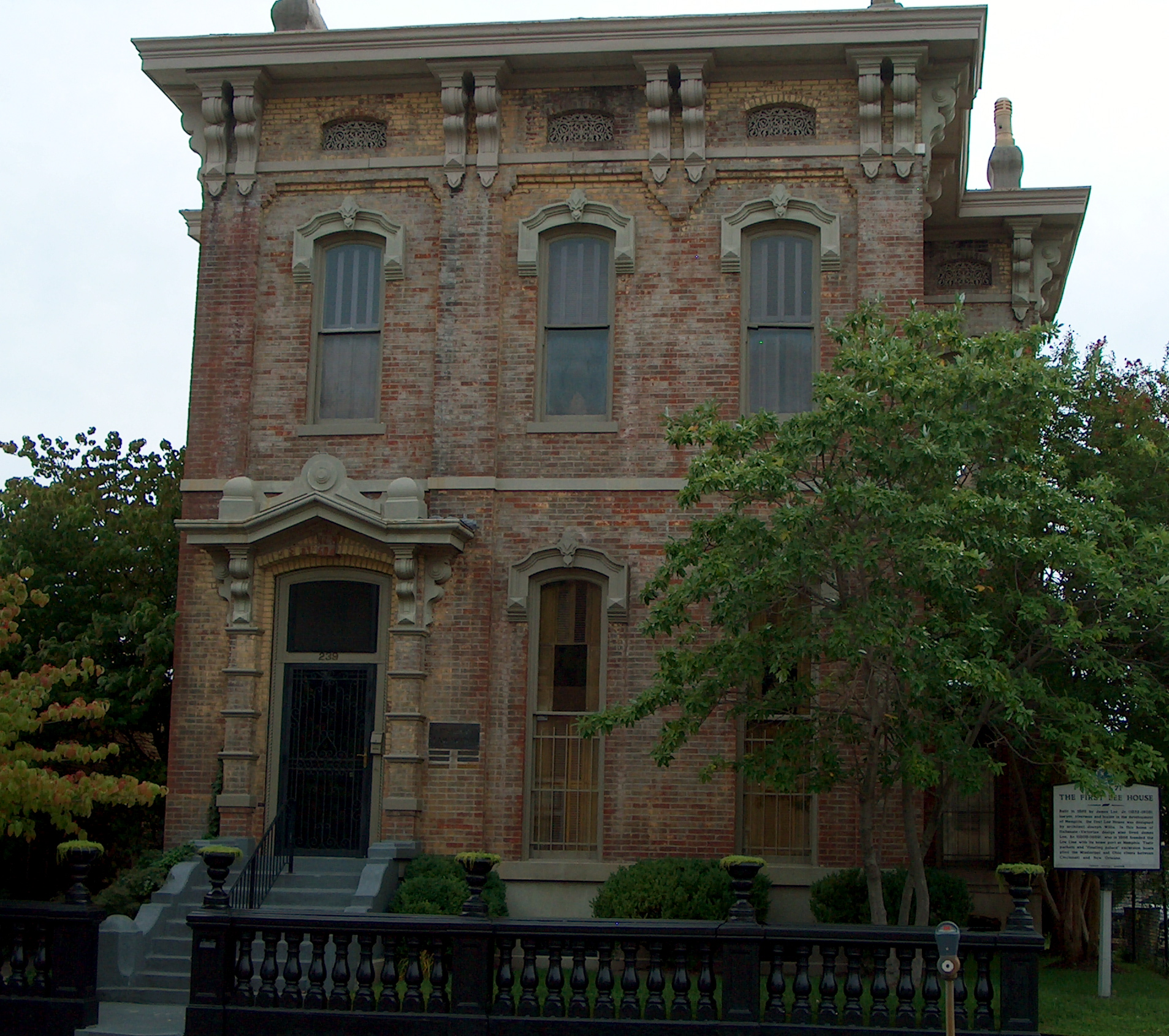
James Lee House (1869), one of the last houses in Downtown.

=== Historic views ===
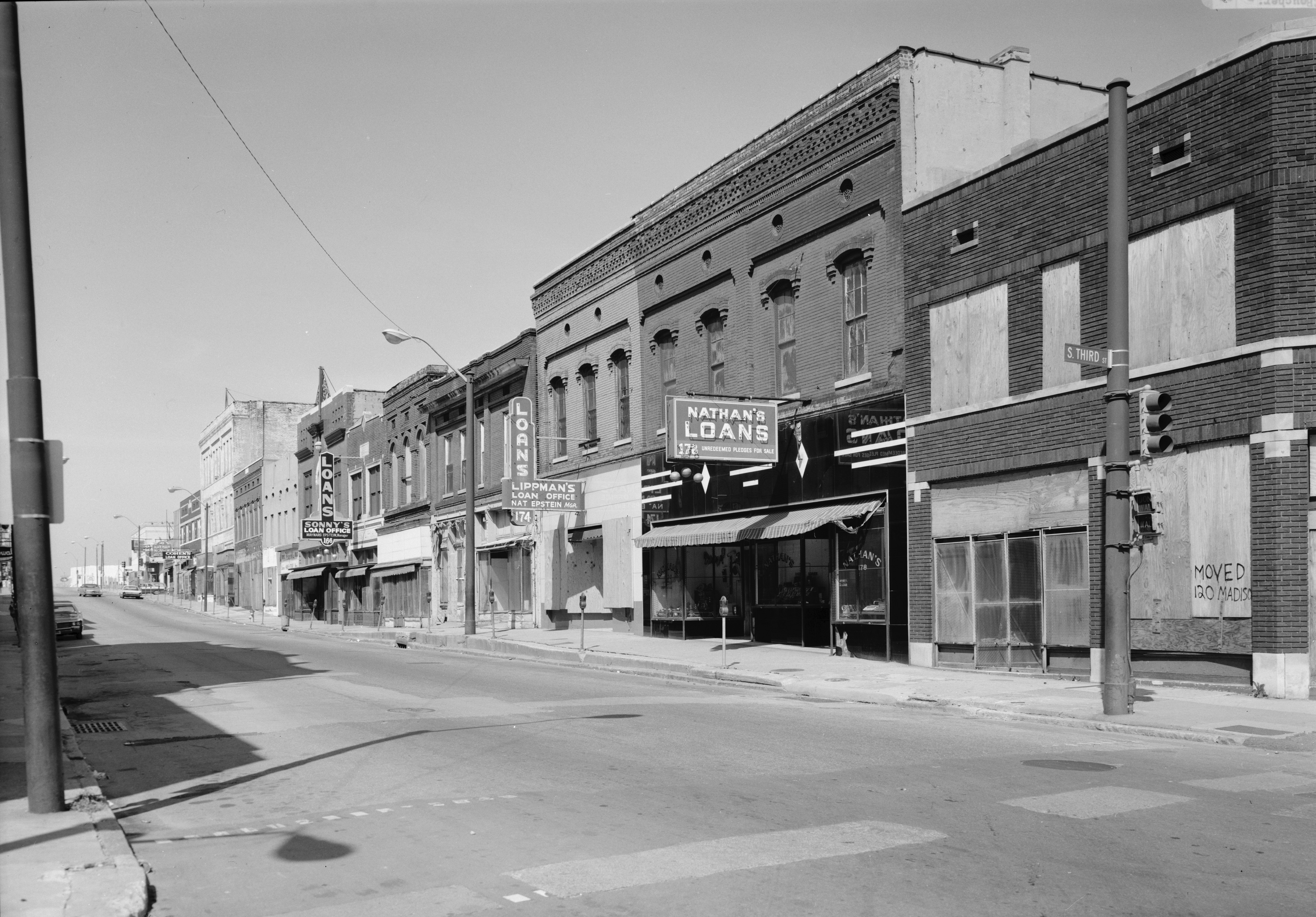
Beale Street in 1974

View of downtown Memphis, looking west on Madison Ave.

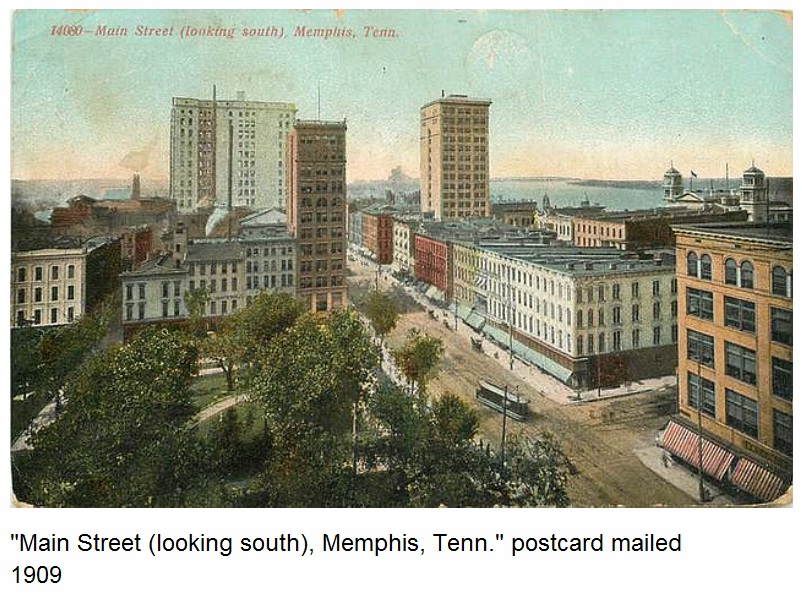
Downtown Memphis in 1909, overlooking Court Square.

View of downtown Memphis in 1907 from the Mississippi River.

View of Madison Avenue, and Customs House and Post Office in 1907.

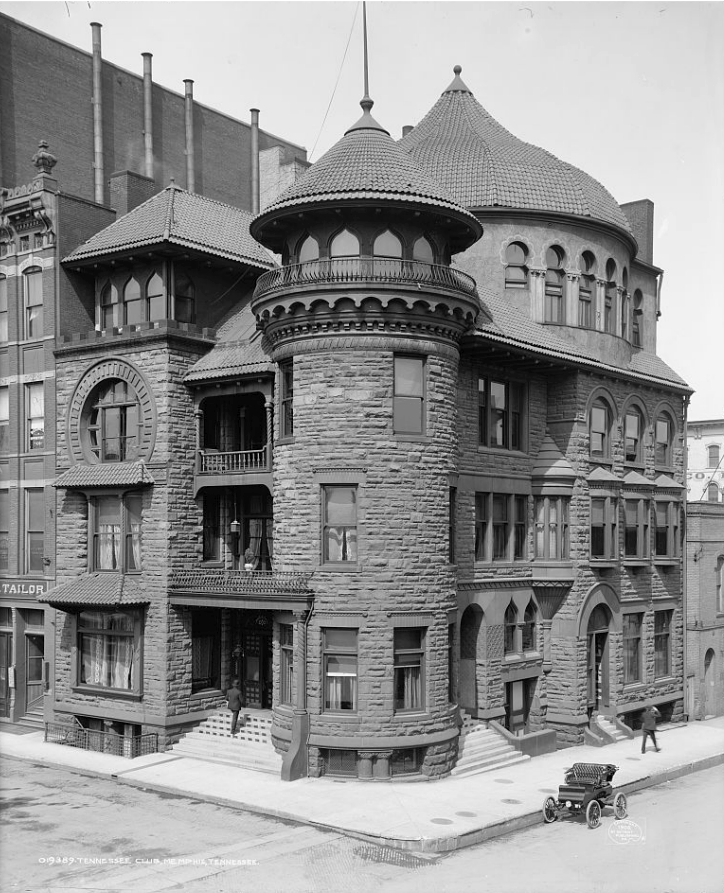
The Tennessee Club on Court Square, 1906.

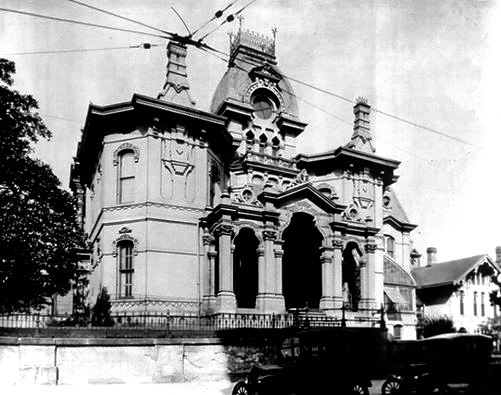
The former Napoleon Hill mansion in Memphis, Tennessee, constructed in 1881 at the corner of 3rd and Madison. The mansion was torn down by 1930 to build the Sterick Building.

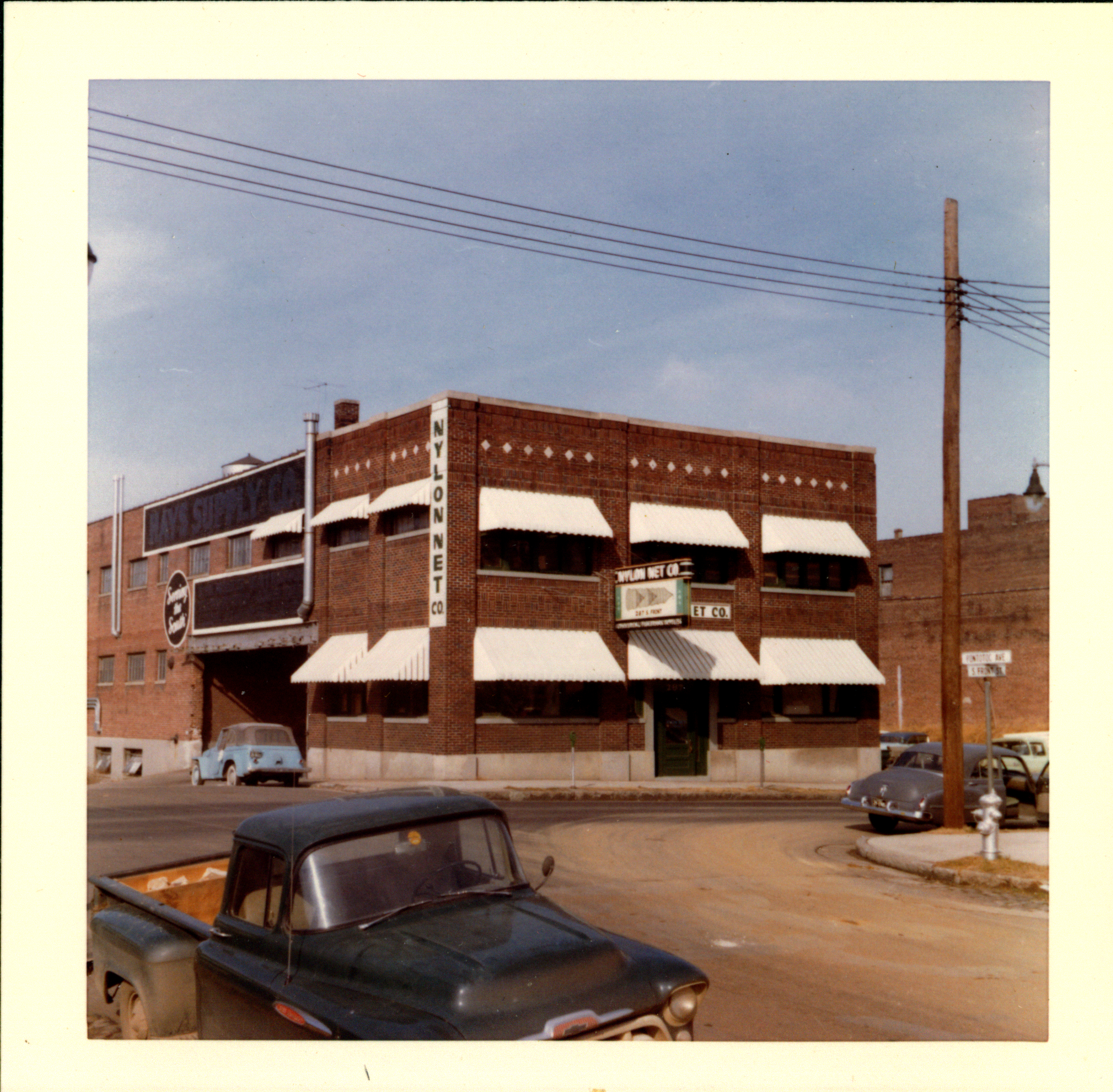
Nylon Net Building circa 1960
