= Pinch District =

Historical district in Memphis, Tennessee

Coordinates: 35°08′12″N 90°00′53″W

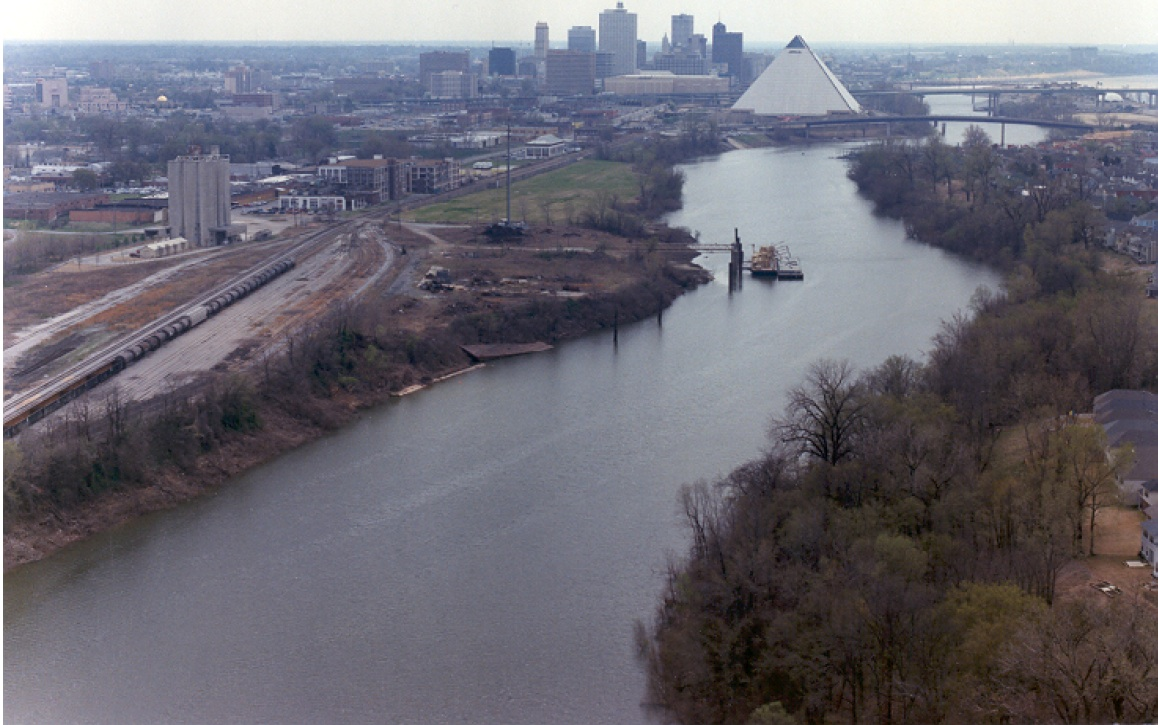
View of the Pinch District and Pyramid Arena from the North

The Pinch District is a historical district of downtown Memphis roughly bordered by the Wolf River lagoon on the west, Market Street on the south, Danny Thomas Boulevard on the east, and A.W. Willis Avenue on the north.

== History ==
The area known as the Pinch District was part of the original plan of Memphis, and emerged as the city's first commercial area. It was originally located north of Market Street and south of the Bayou Gayoso, a stream that ran through (now under) downtown Memphis. The name "Pinch" was originally a derisive term, referring to emaciated Irish immigrants who fled the Great Famine in the 1840s. The area was known as Pinch-Gut, in reference to the starving look of many of its impoverished residents. It was home to the earliest immigrant communities in Memphis, mainly Irish, Italian, Russian, Greek, and Jewish. From the 1890s to the 1930s, it was the center of Memphis' Jewish community, with many synagogues and Jewish-owned businesses. After World War II many of the area's residents moved to the eastern suburbs, and businesses began closing. The area became predominantly African-American, and remains so today. During the 1970s, the Pinch was a target of slum clearance and urban renewal. The Barry Homes housing project was constructed in the Pinch in 1970, and the neighborhood was bisected by Interstate 40 as part of the construction of the Hernando de Soto Bridge in 1973.

=== Growth ===
In 1991, the City of Memphis constructed the Pyramid Arena along the Wolf River lagoon. Initial prospects of turning the area into a new entertainment district diminished by the late 1990s. With the arrival of an NBA franchise, the Memphis Grizzlies, the fate of the Pyramid became grim as a new arena was constructed near Beale Street on the southern side of downtown. Both the Grizzlies and the University of Memphis moved their home games to the FedEx Forum in 2004, and the Pyramid closed as an arena. Several proposals for new development were devised in the mid-2000s, though many never materialized. Recent development has centered on MATA's North End Terminal, which operates as the city's main bus terminal. The Pyramid now has been converted into a Bass Pro Shops megastore opened in May 2015, a hint that gentrification may be returning to the struggling neighborhood.

In 2016, conceptual plans for revitalizing the Pinch District were announced. The design calls for a mixed-used district that would complement a $1 billion expansion of St. Jude. New research and office buildings will be located outside the existing St. Jude gates and will have public-facing retail and restaurant tenants at ground level. Additional mixed-use buildings would provide a mix of office, residential, and hotel space. A long-awaited pedestrian bridge to connect the Pyramid to the greater Pinch District is also planned.

== Gallery ==
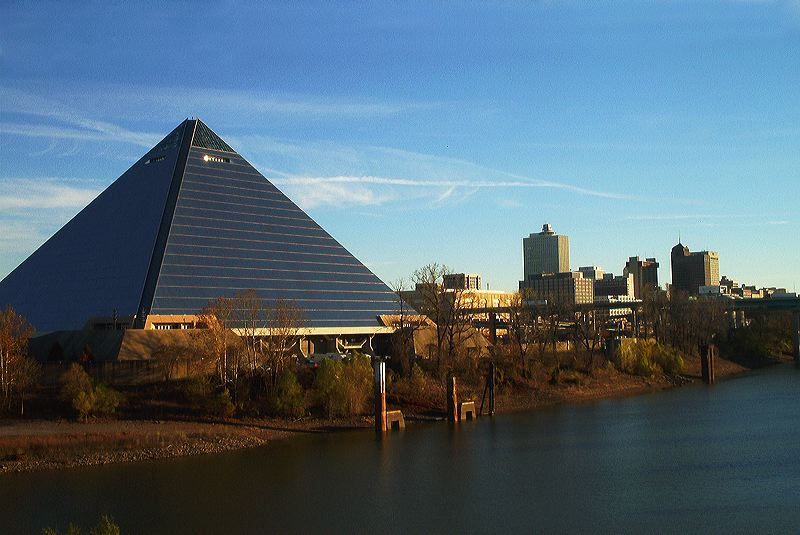
Pyramid Arena

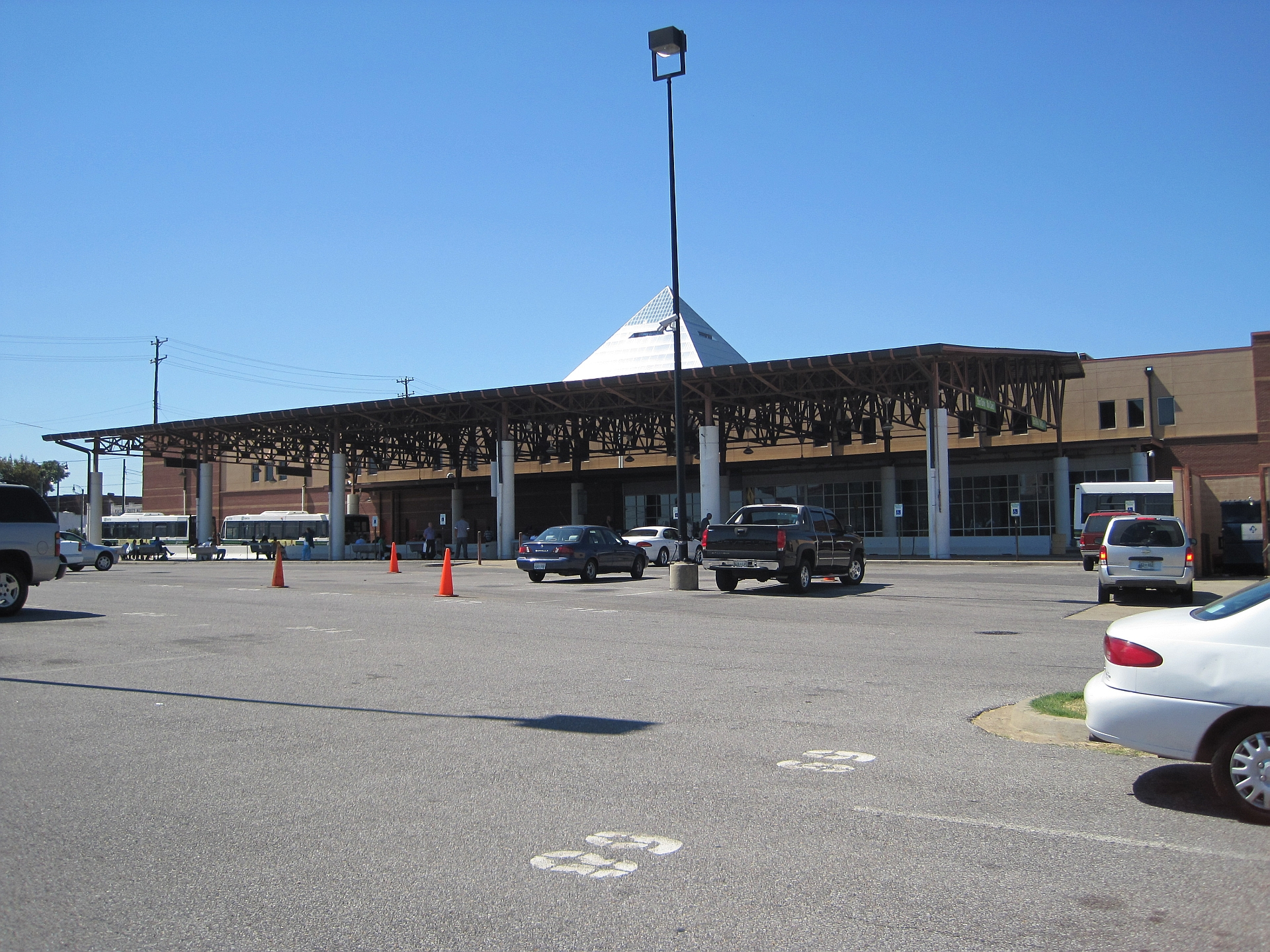
MATA North End Terminal

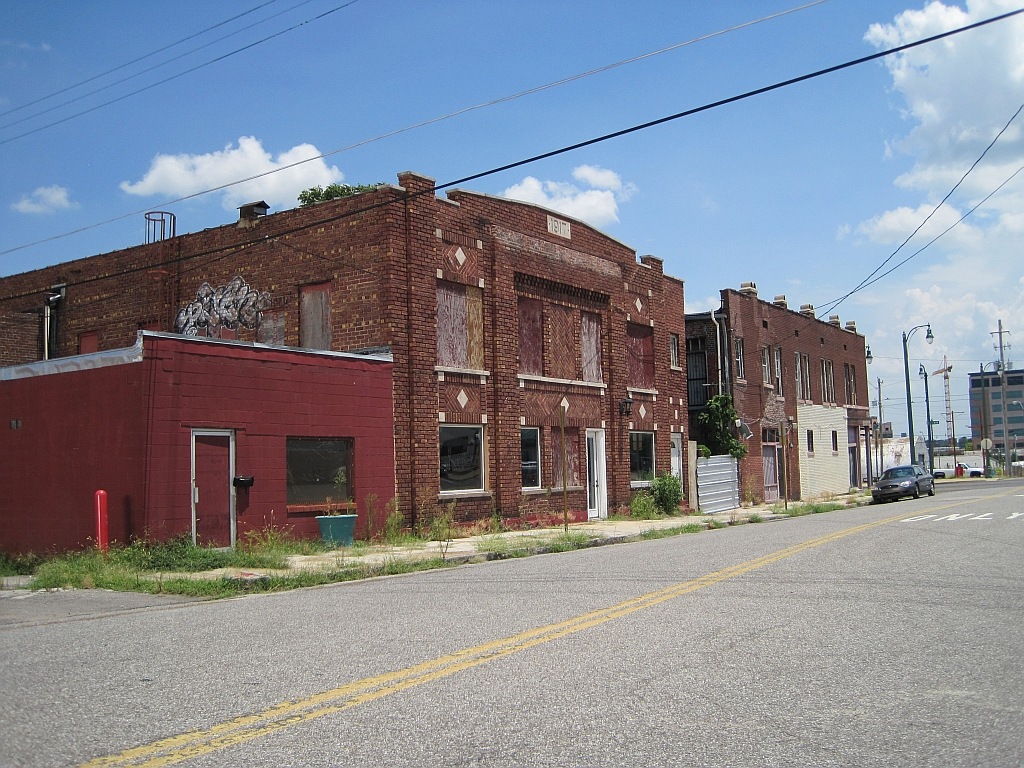
Abandoned storefronts, North Main St.

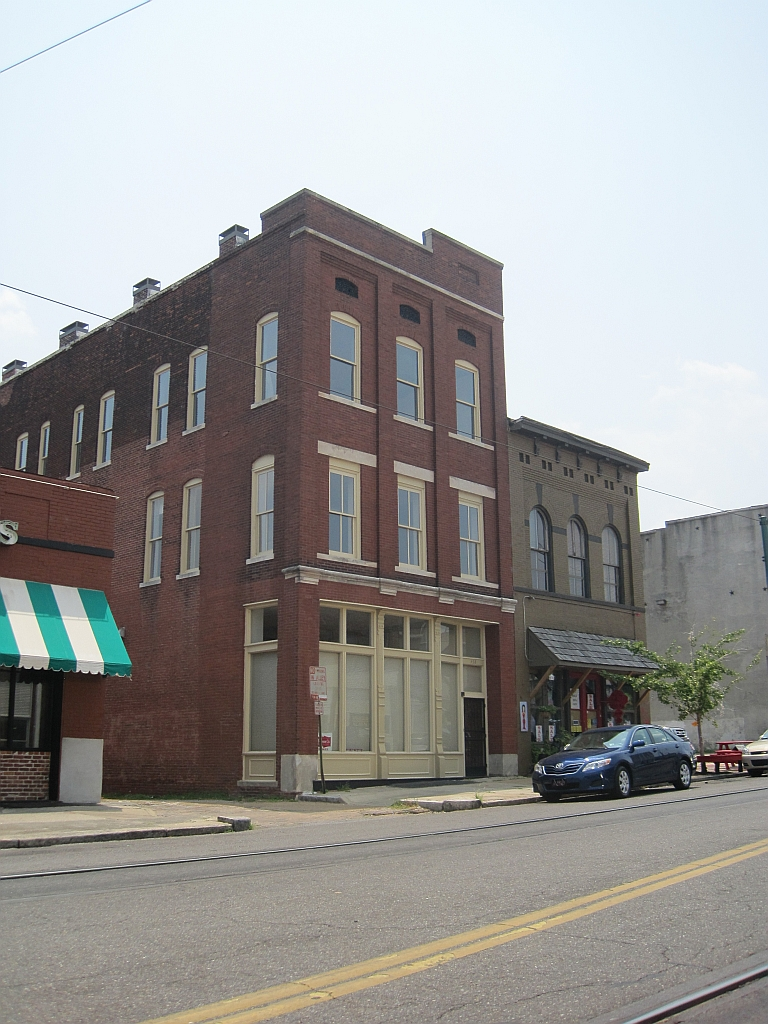
Redeveloped shops along North Main St.

== See also ==
- List of neighborhoods in Memphis, Tennessee
- Downtown Memphis
