= Memphis, Tennessee =

Memphis
- City
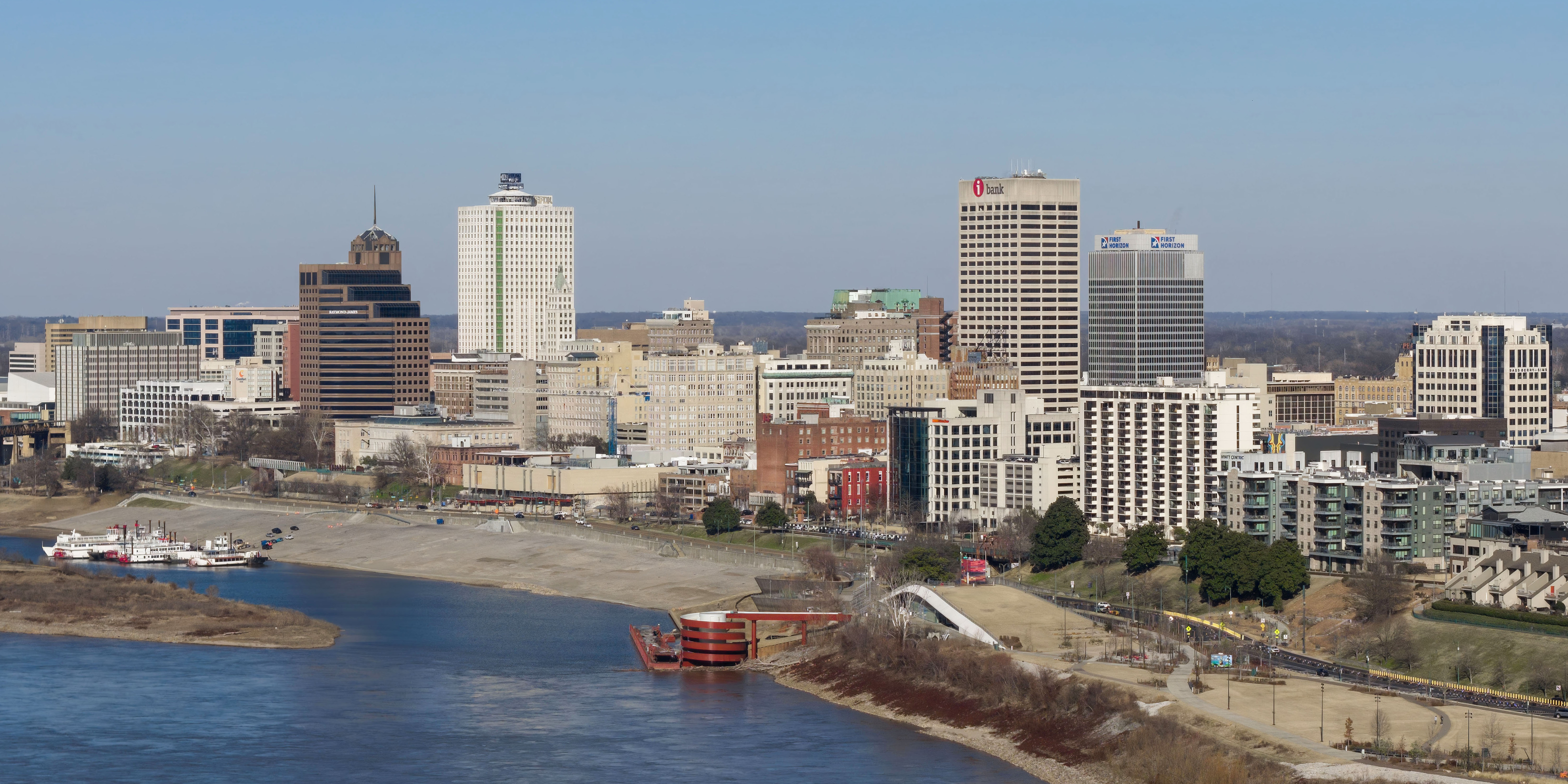
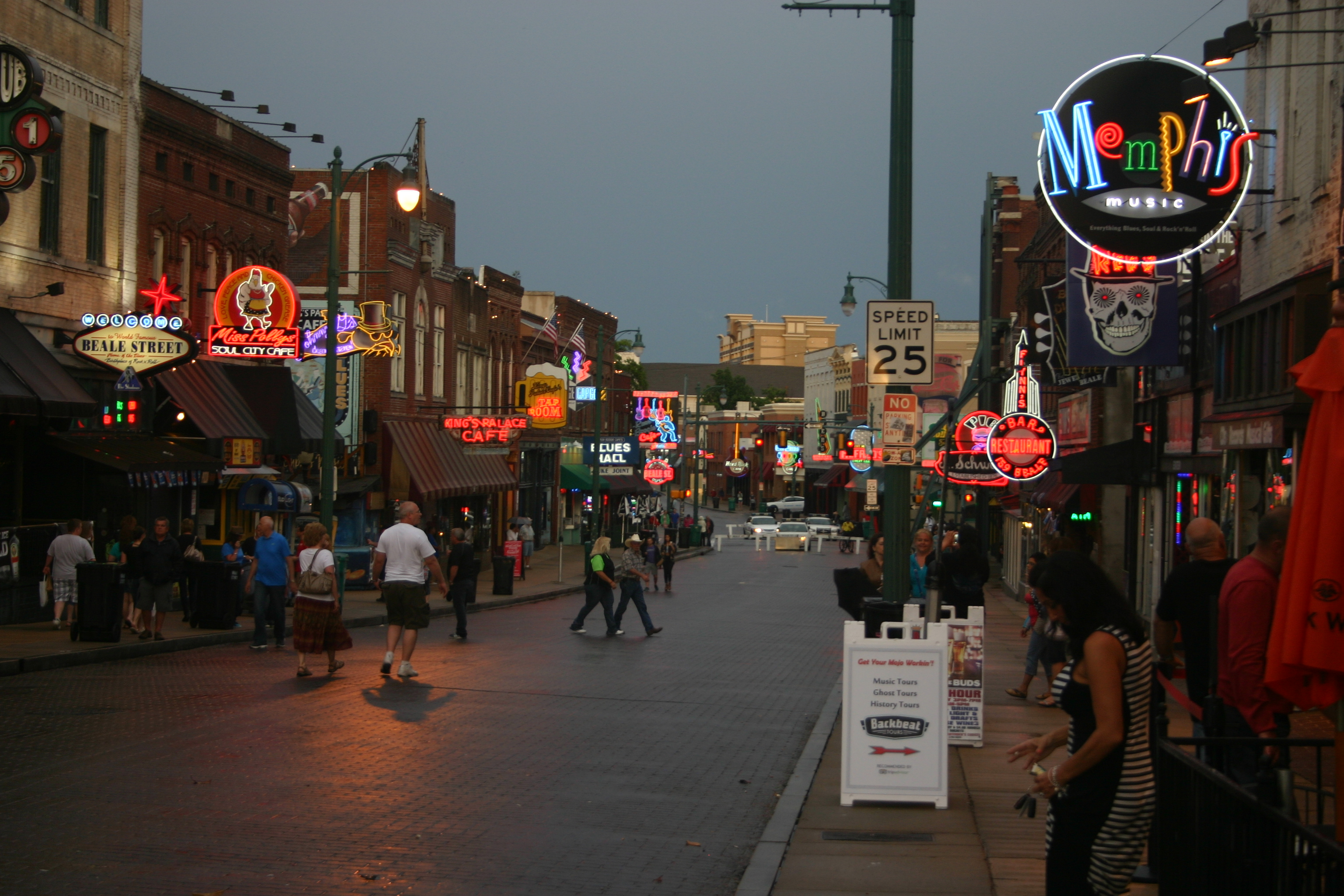
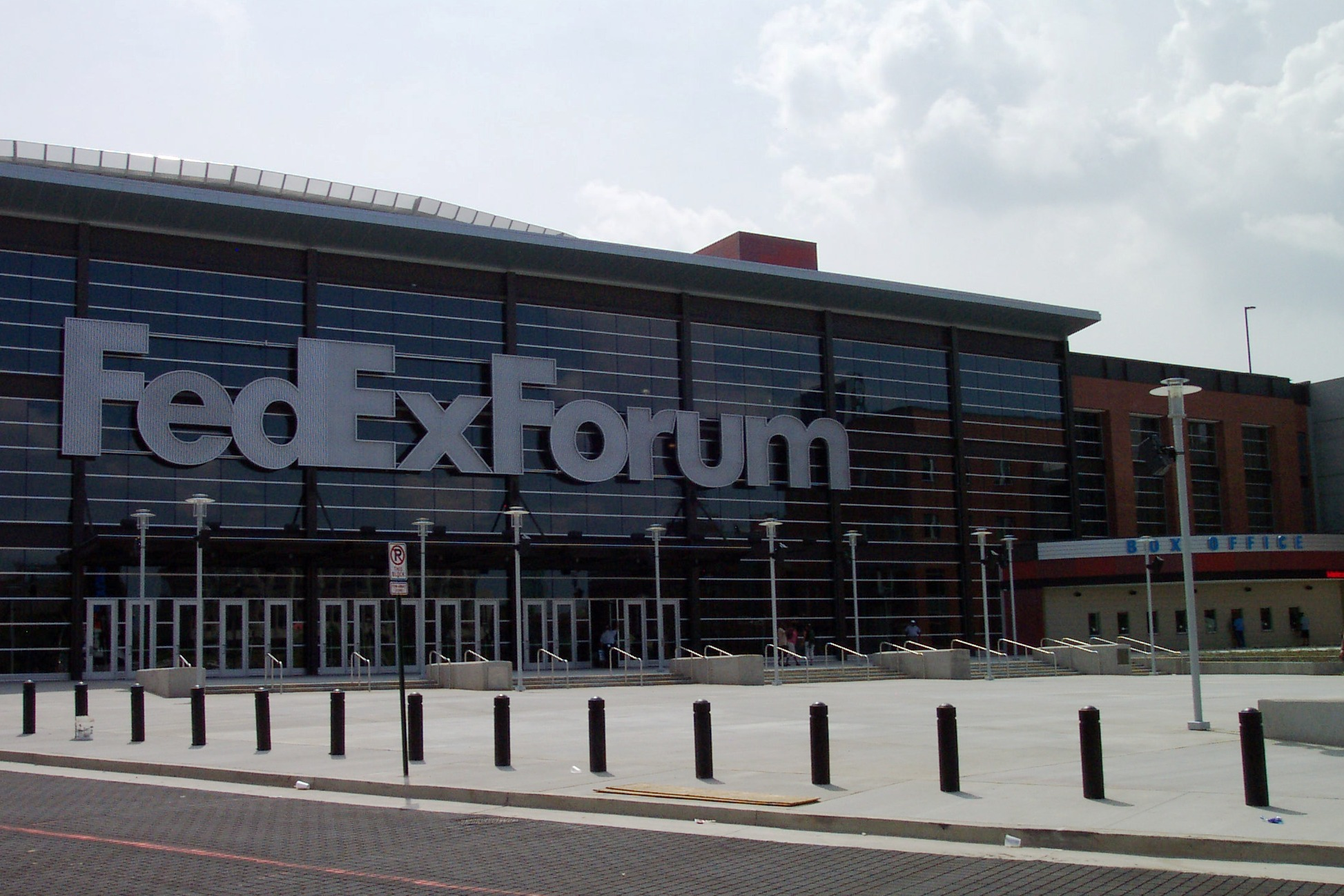
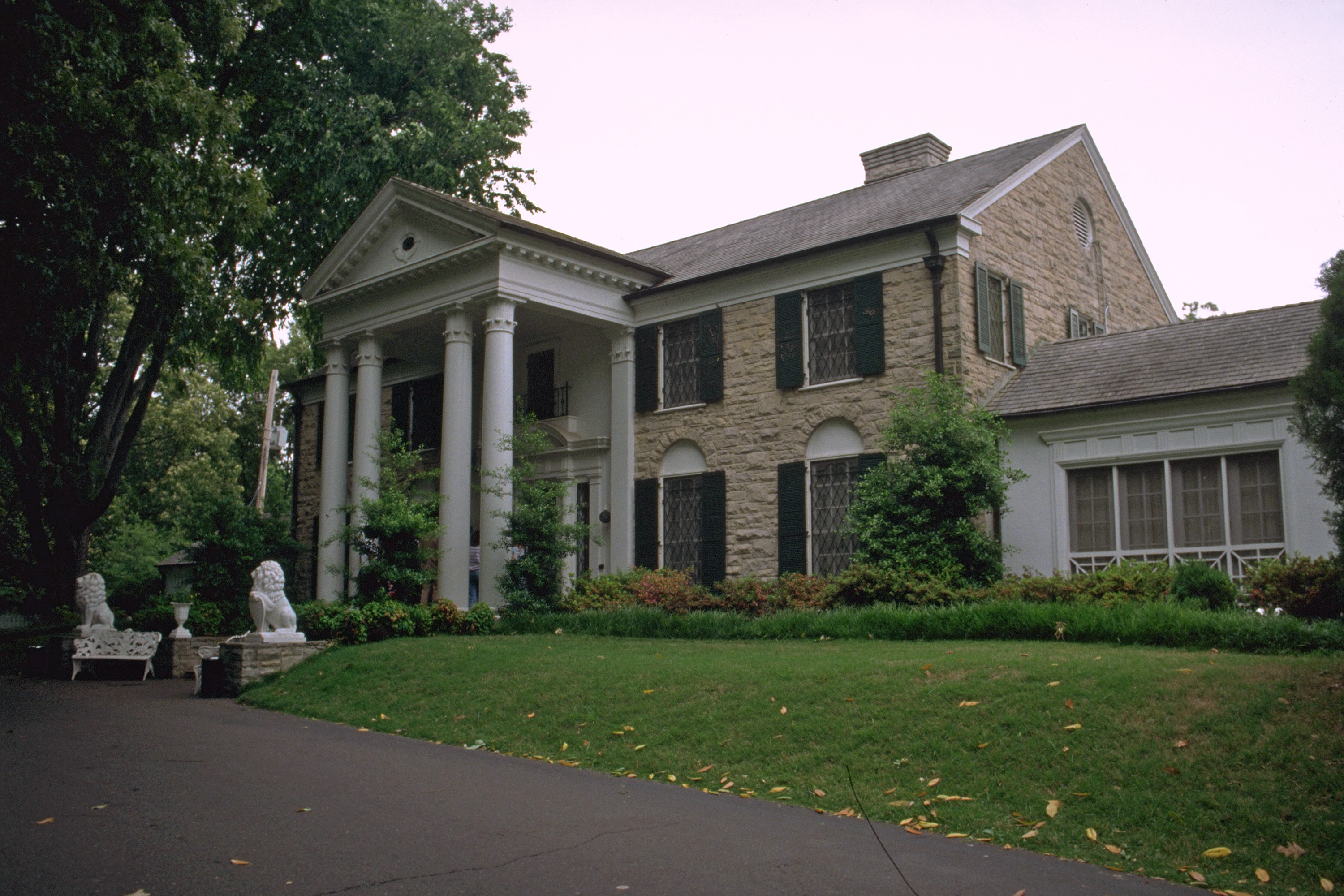
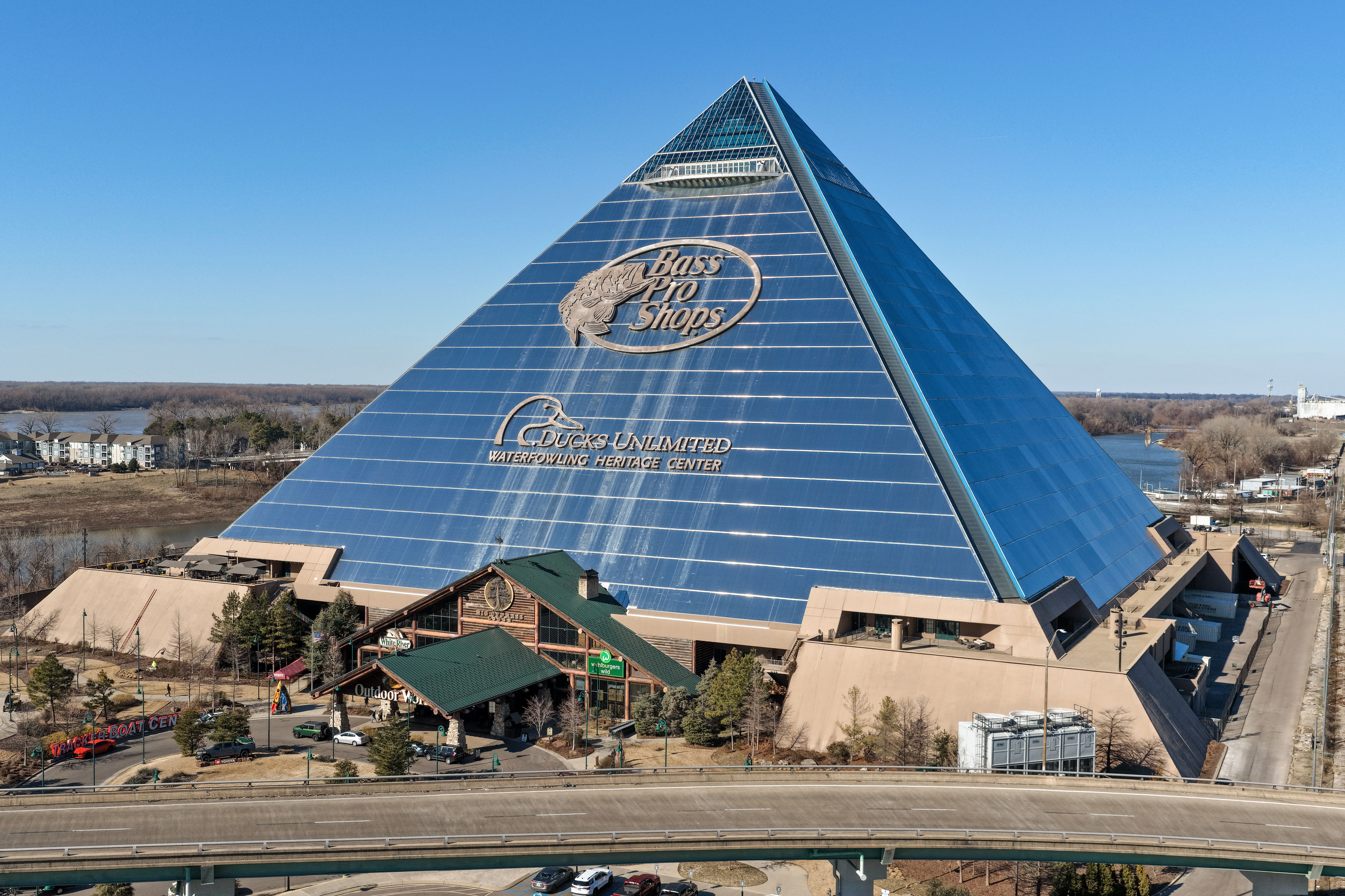
- Downtown Memphis skyline Beale Street FedExForum Graceland Memphis Pyramid

- Flag Seal Wordmark
- Nicknames: Bluff City, Home of the Blues, Grind City, The 901
- Interactive map of Memphis
- Location in Tennessee Location in the United States
- Coordinates: 35°8′46″N 90°3′7″W
- Country: United States
- State: Tennessee
- County: Shelby
- Founded: May 22, 1819
- Incorporated: December 19, 1826
- Dissolved: January 31, 1879
- Rechartered: April 5, 1893
- Founder: John Overton, James Winchester, and Andrew Jackson
- Named for: Memphis, Egypt

Government
  - Mayor: Paul Young (D)

Area
  - City: 302.57 sq mi (783.66 km^{2})
  - Land: 294.92 sq mi (763.83 km^{2})
  - Water: 7.63 sq mi (19.77 km^{2})
- Elevation: 338 ft (103 m)

Population (2020)
  - City: 633,104
  - Estimate (2024): ▼610,919
  - Rank: 77th in North America; 28th in the United States; 2nd in Tennessee
  - Density: 2,146.7/sq mi (828.85/km^{2})
  - Urban: 1,056,190 (US: 45th)
  - Urban density: 2,150/sq mi (830.1/km^{2})
  - Metro: 1,345,425 (US: 45th)
- Demonym: Memphian

GDP
  - Metro: $102.934 billion (2023)
- Time zone: UTC−6 (CST)
  - Summer (DST): UTC−5 (CDT)
- ZIP Codes: ZIP Codes: 37501, 37544, 38101, 38103–38109, 38111–38120, 38122, 38124–38128, 38130–38139, 38141, 38145, 38148, 38150–38152, 38157, 38159, 38161, 38163, 38166–38168, 38173–38175, 38177, 38181–38182, 38184, 38186–38188, 38190, 38193–38194, 38197
- Area code: 901
- FIPS code: 47-48000
- Website: memphistn.gov

Memphis (/ˈmɛmfɪs/ MEM-fiss) is a city in Shelby County, Tennessee, United States, and its county seat. Situated along the Mississippi River, it had a population of 633,104 at the 2020 census, making it the second-most populous city in Tennessee, the fifth-most populous in the Southeast, and the 29th-most populous in the US. While being the most populous single municipality on the Mississippi River, Memphis anchors the third largest metropolitan area by population behind only the Twin Cities and St. Louis. Metropolitan Memphis includes parts of Arkansas and Mississippi, the 45th-most populous metropolitan area in the U.S. with 1.34 million residents.

European exploration of the area began with Spanish conquistador Hernando de Soto in 1541. Located on the high Chickasaw Bluffs, the site offered natural protection from Mississippi River flooding and became a contested location in the colonial era. Modern Memphis was founded in 1819 by John Overton, James Winchester, and Andrew Jackson. The city thrived due to its river traffic and cotton-based economy, becoming one of the largest cities in the Antebellum South. After the American Civil War, it remained a key hub for the cotton and hardwood industries. Memphis is also notable for its role in the American Civil Rights Movement; the Memphis Sanitation Strike which resulted in Dr. Martin Luther King Jr.'s assassination in 1968 at the Lorraine Motel. The Lorraine Motel was acquired by the Martin Luther King Memphis Memorial Foundation in 1982, after which it was converted into the National Civil Rights Museum, a Smithsonian affiliate.

Memphis is one of the nation's leading commercial centers in transportation and logistics. The largest employer is FedEx, which maintains its global air hub at Memphis International Airport, one of the world's busiest cargo airports. The Port of Memphis also hosts the fifth-busiest inland water port in the U.S. Memphis is home to several large financial institutions, including First Horizon Bank, which is the second largest bank with its primary headquarters located in Tennessee. Memphis is also known for its music scene, with Beale Street central to the development of Memphis blues and a broader legacy that includes soul, rock and roll, and hip-hop. Cultural landmarks include Graceland, Sun Studio, the Memphis Pyramid, and the Stax Museum of American Soul Music. The city is also famed for its Memphis-style barbecue and hosts the annual World Championship Barbecue Cooking Contest. It is home to the Memphis Grizzlies of the NBA and several colleges and universities, including the University of Memphis, LeMoyne–Owen College, and Rhodes College.

In the 2020s, after experiencing several decades of high crime rates and incremental population loss, Memphis has begun to revitalize through redevelopment and a renewed focus on crime reduction, with Downtown Memphis being the primary target for renewal. Several projects are in the planning stages or have already begun construction, with a new 16-story research facility being developed on the St. Jude Campus, the renovation of the biggest hotel in downtown, and the redevelopment of the tallest tower in West Tennessee, 100 North Main. Tom Lee Park, the riverside park located downtown, completed a massive renovation in 2023 that cost more than $60 million and includes ballcourts, walkable trails, and bike stands. The park also includes a flyway that stretches out nearly to the Mississippi River and was opened several years after the park's completion.

== History ==
=== Early history ===
Occupying a substantial bluff rising from the Mississippi River, the site of Memphis has been a natural location for human settlement by varying indigenous cultures over thousands of years. In the first millennium A.D. people of the Mississippian culture were prominent; the culture influenced a network of communities throughout the Mississippi River Valley and its tributaries. The hierarchical societies built complexes with large earthwork ceremonial and burial mounds as expressions of their sophisticated culture. The Chickasaw people, believed to be their descendants, later inhabited this site and a large territory in the Southeast.

Spanish explorer Hernando de Soto encountered the historic Chickasaw in this area in the 16th century, followed in the 17th century by French explorers led by René-Robert Cavelier, Sieur de La Salle,.

J. D. L. Holmes, writing in Hudson's Four Centuries of Southern Indians (2007), notes that this site was a third strategic point in the late 18th century through which European powers could control United States encroachment beyond the Appalachians and their interference with Indian matters—after Fort Nogales (present-day Vicksburg) and Fort Confederación (present-day Epes, Alabama): "Chickasaw Bluffs, located on the Mississippi River at the present-day location of Memphis. Spain and the United States vied for control of this site, which was a favorite of the Chickasaws."

In 1795 the Spanish Governor-General of Louisiana, Francisco Luis Héctor de Carondelet, sent his lieutenant governor, Manuel Gayoso de Lemos, to negotiate and secure consent from the local Chickasaw so that a Spanish fort could be erected on the bluff; Fort San Fernando De Las Barrancas was the result. Holmes notes that consent was reached despite opposition from "disappointed Americans and a pro-American faction of the Chickasaws" when the "pro-Spanish faction signed the Chickasaw Bluffs Cession and Spain provided the Chickasaws with a trading post".

Fort San Fernando de las Barrancas remained a focal point of Spanish activity until, as Holmes summarizes:

[T]he Treaty of San Lorenzo or Pinckney's Treaty of 1795 [implemented in March 1797], [had as its result that] all of the careful, diplomatic work by Spanish officials in Louisiana and West Florida, which has succeeded for a decade in controlling the Indians [e.g., the Choctaws], was undone. The United States gained the right to navigate the Mississippi River and won control over the Yazoo Strip north of the thirty-first parallel.

The Spanish dismantled the fort, shipping its lumber and iron to their locations in Arkansas.

In 1796, the site became the westernmost point of the newly admitted state of Tennessee, in what was then called the Southwest United States. The Chickasaw nation continued to largely occupy and control the area. Captain Isaac Guion led an American force down the Ohio River to claim the land, arriving on July 20, 1797. By this time, the Spanish had departed. The fort's ruins went unnoticed 20 years later when Memphis was laid out as a city after the United States government paid the Chickasaw for land.

=== 19th century ===
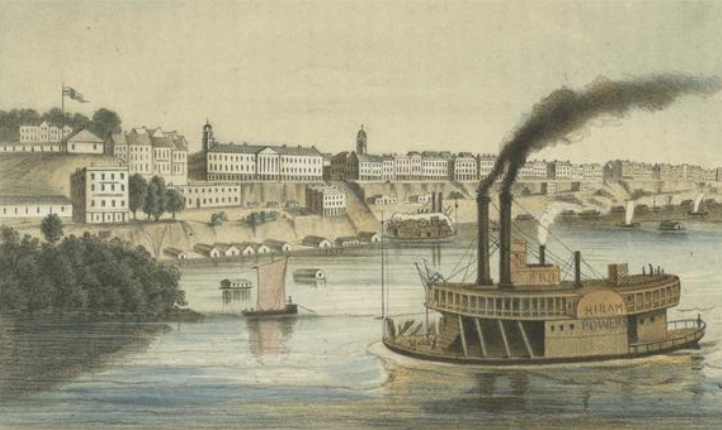
Memphis in the mid-1850s

At the beginning of the century, as recognized by the United States in the 1786 Treaty of Hopewell, the land still belonged to the Chickasaw Nation. In the Treaty of Tuscaloosa, signed in October 1818 and ratified by Congress on January 7, 1819, the Chickasaw ceded their territory in Western Tennessee to the United States. The city of Memphis was founded less than five months after the U.S. takeover of the territory, on May 22, 1819 (incorporated December 19, 1826), by John Overton, James Winchester and Andrew Jackson. They named it after the ancient capital of Egypt on the Nile River.

From the city's foundation onwards, African Americans formed a large proportion of Memphis' population. Prior to the abolition of slavery in the United States, most Black people in Memphis were enslaved, being used as forced labor by white enslavers along the river or on outlying cotton plantations in the Mississippi Delta. The city's demographics changed dramatically in the 1850s and 1860s due to waves of immigration and domestic migration. Due to increased immigration since the 1840s and the Great Famine, Irish Americans made up 9.9% of the population in 1850, but 23.2% by 1860, when the total population was 22,623.

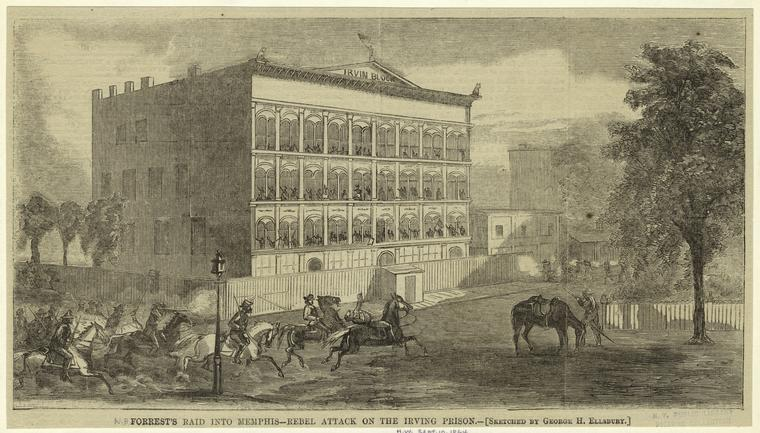
Attack on Irving Block by General Forrest in 1864

Tennessee seceded from the Union in June 1861, and Memphis briefly became a Confederate stronghold. Union ironclad gunboats captured it in the naval Battle of Memphis on June 6, 1862, and the city and state were occupied by the Union Army for the duration of the war. Union commanders allowed the city to maintain its civil government during most of this period but excluded Confederate States Army veterans from office. This shifted political dynamics in the city as the war went on.

The war years contributed to additional dramatic changes in the city population. The Union Army's presence attracted many fugitive slaves who had escaped from surrounding rural plantations. So many sought protection behind Union lines that the Army set up contraband camps to accommodate them. Memphis's black population increased from 3,000 in 1860, when the total population was 22,623, to nearly 20,000 in 1865, with most settling south of the city limits.

=== Postwar years, Reconstruction and Democratic control ===
The rapid demographic changes added to the stress of war and occupation and uncertainty about who was in charge, increasing tensions between the city's ethnic Irish policemen and black Union soldiers after the war. In three days of rioting in early May 1866, the Memphis Riots erupted, in which white mobs made up of policemen, firemen, and other mostly ethnic Irish Americans attacked and killed 46 black people, wounding 75 and injuring 100; raped several women; and destroyed nearly 100 houses while severely damaging churches and schools in South Memphis. The riots left much of the black settlement in ruins. Two white people were killed in the riot. Many black people permanently fled Memphis afterward, especially as the Freedmen's Bureau continued to have difficulty in protecting them. Their population fell to about 15,000 by 1870, 37.4% of the total population of 40,226.

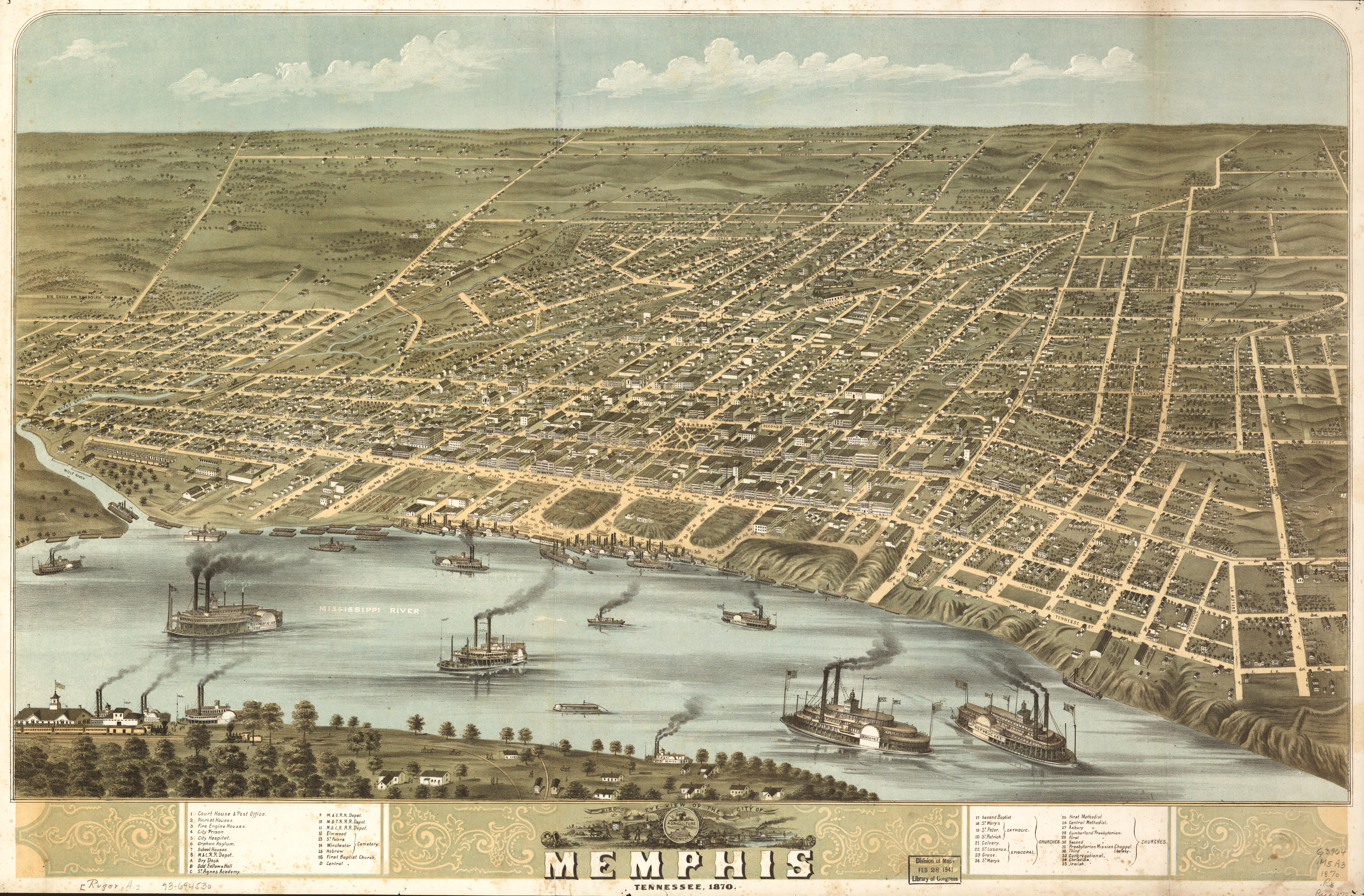
Historic aerial view of Memphis, 1870

Historian Barrington Walker suggests that the Irish rioted against blacks because of their relatively recent arrival as immigrants and the uncertain nature of their claim to "whiteness"; they were trying to distinguish themselves from blacks in the underclass. The main fighting participants were ethnic Irish, decommissioned black Union soldiers, and newly emancipated African-American freedmen. Walker suggests that most of the mob was not in direct economic conflict with the blacks, as by then the Irish had attained better jobs but were establishing social and political dominance over the freedmen.

Unlike the disturbances in some other cities, ex-Confederate veterans generally did not attack blacks in Memphis. As a result of the riots in Memphis, and a similar one in New Orleans, Louisiana in September, Congress passed the Reconstruction Act and the Fourteenth Amendment to the U.S. Constitution.

=== Yellow fever epidemics ===
In the 1870s, a series of yellow fever epidemics devastated Memphis, with the disease carried by river passengers traveling by ships along the waterways. During the Yellow Fever Epidemic of 1878, more than 5,000 people were listed in the official register of deaths between July 26 and November 27. The vast majority of these deaths were from yellow fever, making the epidemic in the city of 40,000 one of the most traumatic and severe in urban U.S. history. Within four days of the Memphis Board of Health's declaration of a yellow fever outbreak, 20,000 residents fled the city. The ensuing panic left the poverty-stricken, the working classes, and the African-American community at the most risk from the epidemic. Those who remained relied on volunteers from religious and physician organizations to tend to the sick. Memphis confirmed more than 5,000 deaths by the year's end. The New Orleans health board listed "not less than 4,600" dead. The Mississippi Valley recorded 120,000 cases of yellow fever, with 20,000 deaths. The epidemic's $15 million in losses bankrupted Memphis, leading the state legislature to revoke its charter.

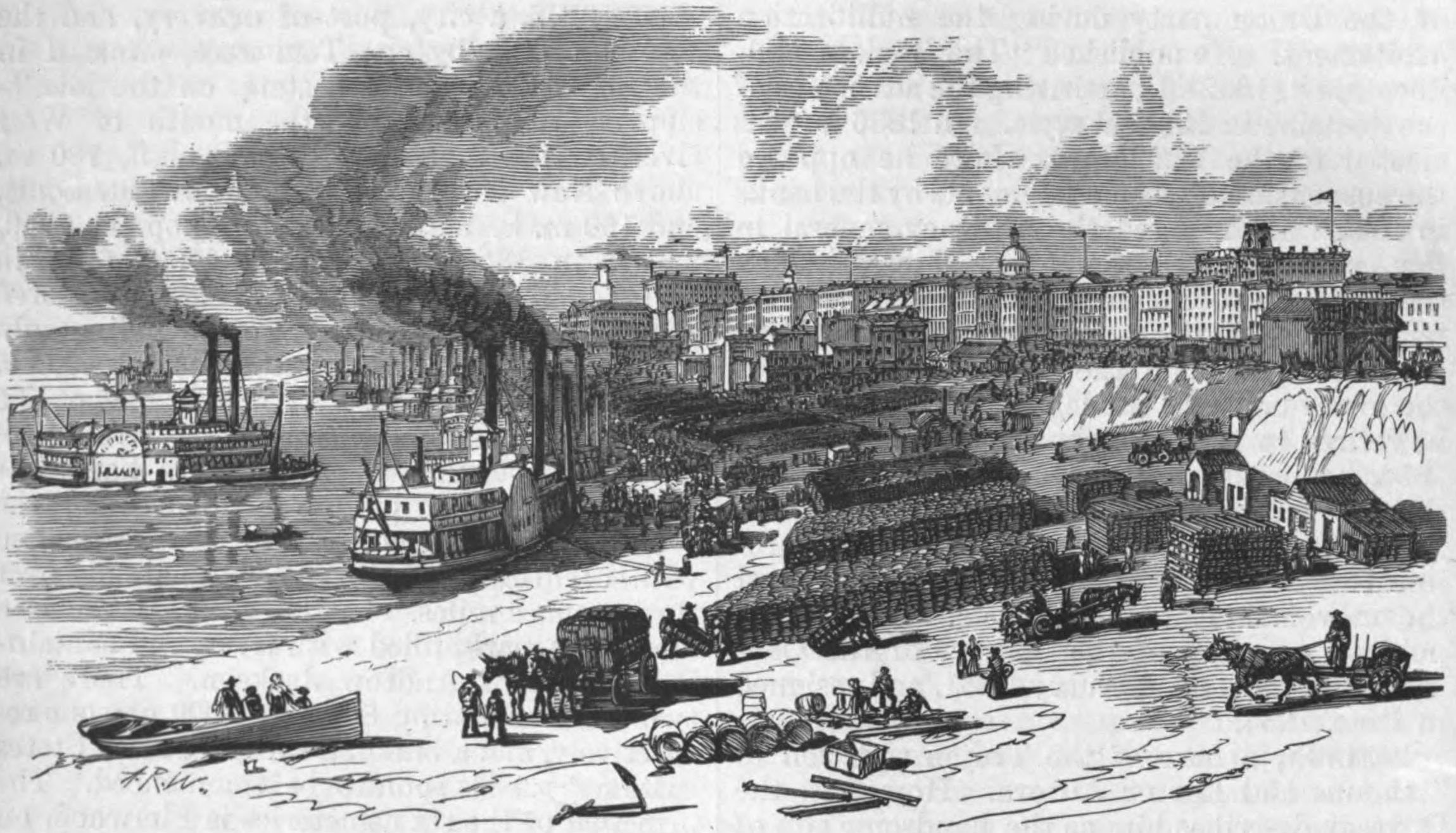
Woodcut representing the waterfront of Memphis, c. 1879

By 1870, Memphis's population of 40,000 was almost double that of Nashville and Atlanta, and it was the second-largest city in the South after New Orleans. Its population continued to grow after 1870, even when the Panic of 1873 hit the US hard, particularly in the South. The Panic of 1873 resulted in expanding Memphis's underclasses amid the poverty and hardship it wrought, giving further credence to Memphis as a rough, shiftless city. Leading up to the outbreak in 1878, it had suffered two yellow fever epidemics, cholera, and malaria, giving it a reputation as sickly and filthy. It was unheard of for a city with a population as large as Memphis's not to have any waterworks; the city still relied for supplies entirely on collecting water from the river and rain cisterns and had no way to remove sewage. The combination of a swelling population, especially of lower and working classes, and abysmal health and sanitary conditions made Memphis ripe for a serious epidemic.

Kate Bionda, an owner of an Italian "snack house", died of a fever on August 13, 1878. Hers was officially reported by the Board of Health, on August 14, as the first case of yellow fever in the city. A massive panic ensued. The same trains and steamboats that had brought thousands into Memphis in five days carried away more than 25,000 refugees, more than half of the city's population. On August 23, the Board of Health finally declared a yellow fever epidemic in Memphis, and the city collapsed, hemorrhaging its population. In July of that year, the city had a population of 47,000; by September, 19,000 remained, and 17,000 of them had yellow fever. The only people left in the city were the lower classes, such as German and Irish immigrant workers and African Americans. None had the means to flee the city, as did the middle- and upper-class whites of Memphis, and thus they were subjected to a city of death.

Charles G. Fisher immediately formed a Citizen's Relief Committee following the Board of Health's declaration. It organized the city into refugee camps. The committee's main priority was to separate the poor from the city and isolate them in refugee camps. The Howard Association, formed specifically for yellow fever epidemics in New Orleans and Memphis, organized nurses and doctors in Memphis and throughout the country. They stayed at the Peabody Hotel, the only hotel to keep its doors open during the epidemic. From there they were assigned to their respective districts. Physicians of the epidemic reported seeing as many as 100 to 150 patients daily.

The Episcopal Community of St. Mary at St. Mary's Episcopal Cathedral played an important role during the epidemic in caring for the lower classes. Already supporting a girls' school and church orphanage, the Sisters of St. Mary also sought to provide care for the Canfield Asylum, a home for black children. Each day, they alternated caring for the orphans at St. Mary's, delivering children to the Canfield Asylum, and taking soup and medicine on house calls to patients. Between September 9 and October 4, Sister Constance and three other nuns fell victim to the epidemic and died. They later became known as the Martyrs of Memphis.

At long last, on October 28, a killing frost struck. The city sent out word to Memphians scattered all over the country to come home. Though yellow fever cases were recorded in the pages of Elmwood Cemetery's burial record as late as February 29, 1874, the epidemic seemed quieted. The Board of Health declared the epidemic at an end after it had caused over 20,000 deaths and financial losses of nearly $200 million. On November 27, a general citizen's meeting was called at the Greenlaw Opera House to offer thanks to those who had stayed behind to serve, of whom many had died. Over the next year property tax revenues collapsed, and the city could not make payments on its municipal debts. As a result, Memphis temporarily lost its city charter and was reclassified by the state legislature as a Taxing District from 1879 to 1893. But a new era of sanitation was developed in the city, and a new municipal government in 1879 helped form the first regional health organization, and during the 1880s Memphis led the nation in sanitary reform and improvements.

Perhaps the most significant effect of yellow fever on Memphis was in demographic changes. Nearly all of Memphis's upper and middle classes vanished, depriving the city of its general leadership and class structure that dictated everyday life, similar to that in other large Southern cities, such as New Orleans, Charleston, and Atlanta. In Memphis, the poorer whites and blacks fundamentally made up the city and played the greatest role in rebuilding it. The epidemic had resulted in Memphis being a less cosmopolitan place, with an economy that served the cotton trade and a population drawn increasingly from poor white and black Southerners.

=== Late 19th century ===
The 1890 election was strongly contested, resulting in white opponents of the D. P. Hadden faction working to deprive them of votes by disenfranchising blacks. The state had enacted several laws, including the requirement of poll taxes, that made it more difficult for them to register to vote and served to disenfranchise many blacks. Although political party factions in the future sometimes paid poll taxes to enable blacks to vote, African Americans lost their last positions on the city council in this election and were forced out of the police force. (They did not recover the ability to exercise the franchise until after the passage of civil rights legislation in the mid-1960s.) Historian L. B. Wrenn suggests the heightened political hostility of the Democratic contest and related social tensions contributed to a white mob lynching three black grocers in Memphis in 1892.

Journalist Ida B. Wells of Memphis investigated the lynchings, as one of the men killed was a friend of hers. She demonstrated that these and other lynchings were more often due to economic and social competition than any criminal offenses by black men. Her findings were considered so controversial and aroused so much anger that she was forced to move away from the city. But she continued to investigate and publish the abuses of lynching.

Businessmen were eager to increase the city population after the losses of 1878–79, and supported the annexation of new areas; this measure was passed in 1890 before the census. The annexation measure was finally approved by the state legislature through a compromise achieved with real estate magnates, and the area annexed was slightly smaller than first proposed.

In 1893 the city was rechartered with home rule, which restored its ability to enact taxes. The state legislature established a cap rate. Although the commission government was retained and enlarged to five commissioners, Democratic politicians regained control from the business elite. The commission form of government was believed to be effective in getting things done, but because all positions were elected at-large, requiring them to gain majority votes, this practice reduced representation by candidates representing significant minority political interests.

=== 20th century ===
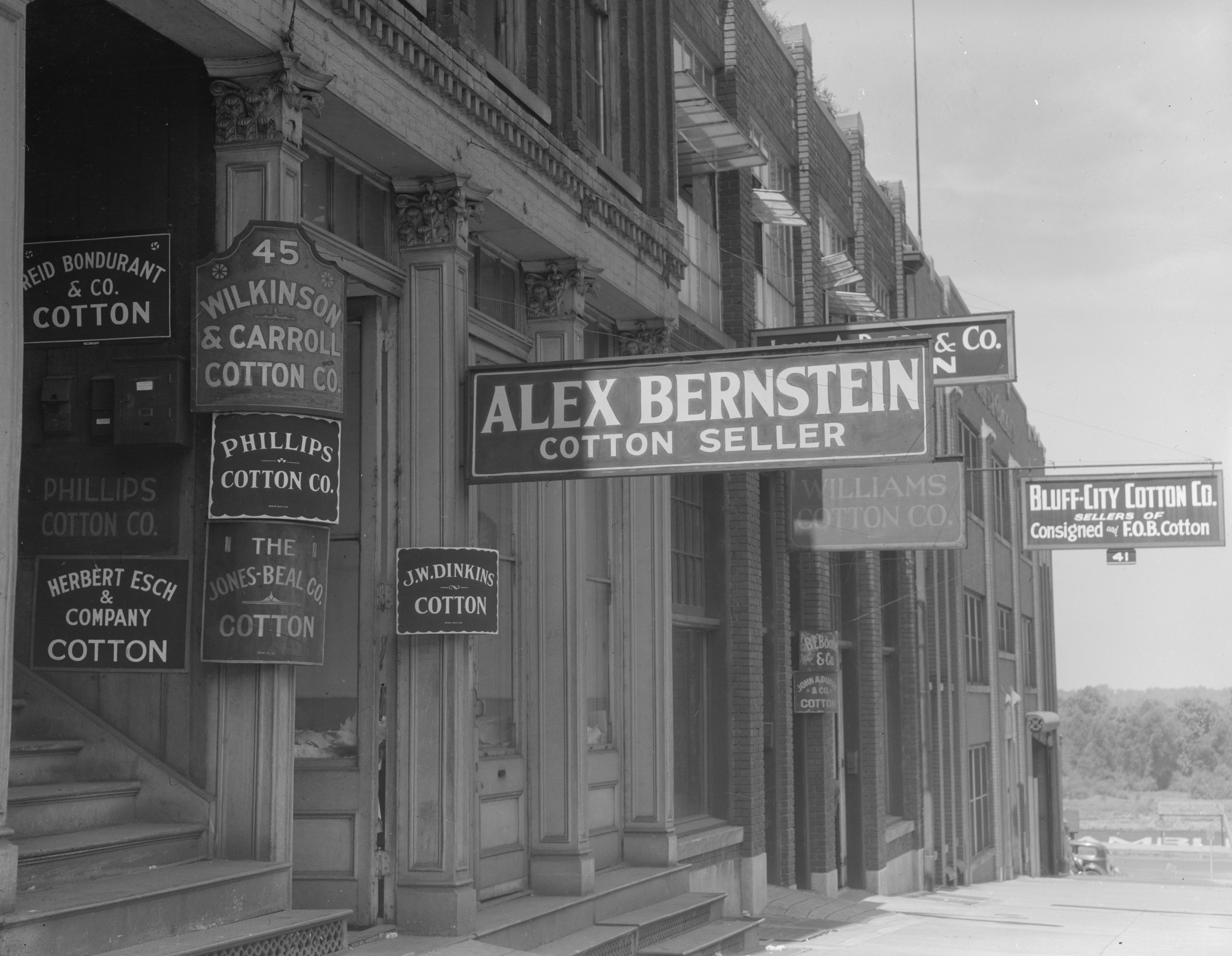
Cotton merchants on Union Avenue (1937)

==== Business ====
In terms of its economy, Memphis developed as the world's largest spot cotton market and the world's largest hardwood lumber market, both commodity products of the Mississippi Delta. Into the 1950s, it was also the world's largest mule market. These animals were still used extensively for agriculture. Attracting workers from Southern rural areas as well as new European immigrants, from 1900 to 1950 the city increased nearly fourfold in population, from 102,350 to 396,000 residents.

Racist violence continued into the 20th century, with four lynchings between 1900 and the lynching of Thomas Williams in 1928.

A Tennessee Powder Company built an explosives powder plant to make TNT and gunpowder on a 6,000-acre site in Millington in 1940. The plant was built to make smokeless gunpowder for the British Armed Forces during World War II. In May 1941, DuPont (1802–2017) took over the plant, changed the name to the Chickasaw Ordnance Works, and produced powder for the United States Armed Forces. There were 8,000 employees. The plant was dismantled after the war in 1946.

==== Politics: The Crump Machine ====
From the 1910s to about 1950, Memphis politics was controlled by E. H. "Boss" Crump. Crump worked with the city's middle-class progressive leadership. He built up the police and fire departments—and for decades routinely called on off-duty policemen and firemen to help him out on election day. He built up public schools and reorganized city government for more efficiency. Most progressives in the South were hostile to African American interests, but not Crump. He worked with the leading Black politician Robert Church Jr. until 1940, as well as key Black ministers. Crump raised funds from white businessmen that paid the poll taxes for Blacks, which enabled them all to vote. Crump had his limits. He avoided the demand for prohibition by Baptist activists and tolerated the city's thriving saloons and houses of prostitution. Crump served briefly in Congress, which gave him a good view of the national picture. He was an early supporter of New York Governor Franklin D. Roosevelt for the presidency in 1932. Crump strongly supported President Roosevelt in Memphis and statewide through his influence on the Congressional delegation. FDR responded by being very generous to the state, as seen in the massive TVA project. He gave Crump control of Memphis patronage and most statewide patronage.

Crump secured a state law in 1911 to establish a small commission to manage the city. The city retained a form of commission government until 1967 and patronage flourished under Crump. The city installed a revolutionary sewer system and upgraded sanitation and drainage to prevent another epidemic. Pure water from an artesian well was discovered in the 1880s, securing the city's water supply. The commissioners developed an extensive network of parks and public works as part of the national City Beautiful movement. Lynette Wrenn concludes the new system handled business efficiently. However, it tended toward policies that benefited the city's wealthier residents while sometimes overlooking the needs of its less affluent neighborhoods.

==== Since 1950 ====
Memphis did not become a home rule city until 1963, although the state legislature had amended the constitution in 1953 to provide home rule for cities and counties. Before that, the city had to get state bills approved in order to change its charter and other policies and programs. Since 1963, it can change the charter by popular approval of the electorate.

During the 1960s, the city was at the center of the Civil Rights Movement, as its large African-American population had been affected by state segregation practices and disenfranchisement in the early 20th century. African-American residents drew from the civil rights movement to improve their lives. In October 1960, in the wake of a student sit-in at the Central Library and the Cossitt Reference Library in March 1960 and a lawsuit filed by civil rights activist and community leader Jesse Turner, Memphis Public Libraries would desegregate. In December 1960, following more pressure from local activists, Memphis Zoo and the local Brooks Art Museum would be desegregated as well. St. Jude Children's Research Hospital, which opened in Memphis in February 1962, would also be the first fully integrated children's hospital based in the South. In 1968, the Memphis sanitation strike began for living wages and better working conditions; the workers were overwhelmingly African American. They marched to gain public awareness and support for their plight: the danger of their work and the struggles to support families with their low pay. Their drive for better pay had been met with resistance by the city government.

Martin Luther King Jr. of the Southern Christian Leadership Conference, known for his leadership in the nonviolent movement, came to lend his support to the workers' cause. King stayed at the Lorraine Motel in the city, and was assassinated by James Earl Ray on April 4, 1968, the day after giving his "I've Been to the Mountaintop" speech at the Mason Temple.

After learning of King's murder, many African Americans in the city rioted, looting and destroying businesses and other facilities, some by arson. The governor ordered Tennessee National Guardsmen into the city within hours, where small, roving bands of rioters continued to be active. Fearing the violence, more of the middle class began to leave the city for the suburbs.

In 1970, the Census Bureau reported Memphis's population as 60.8% white and 38.9% black. Suburbanization was attracting wealthier residents to newer housing outside the city. After the riots and court-ordered busing in 1973 to achieve desegregation of public schools, "about 40,000 of the system's 71,000 white students abandon[ed] the system in four years." Today, the city has a majority African-American population.

Memphis is well known for its cultural contributions to the identity of the American South. Many renowned musicians grew up in and around Memphis and moved to Chicago and other areas from the Mississippi Delta, carrying their music with them to influence other cities and listeners over radio airwaves.

Former and current Memphis residents include musicians Elvis Presley, Jerry Lee Lewis, Muddy Waters, Carl Perkins, Johnny Cash, Robert Johnson, W. C. Handy, Bobby Whitlock, B.B. King, Howlin' Wolf, Isaac Hayes, Booker T. Jones, Eric Gales, Al Green, Alex Chilton, Three 6 Mafia, the Sylvers, Jay Reatard, Zach Myers, and Aretha Franklin.

On December 23, 1988, a tanker truck hauling liquefied propane crashed at the I-40/I-240 interchange in Midtown and exploded, starting multiple vehicle and structural fires. Nine people were killed and ten were injured. It was one of Tennessee's deadliest motor vehicle accidents and eventually led to the reconstruction of the interchange where it occurred.

=== 21st century ===
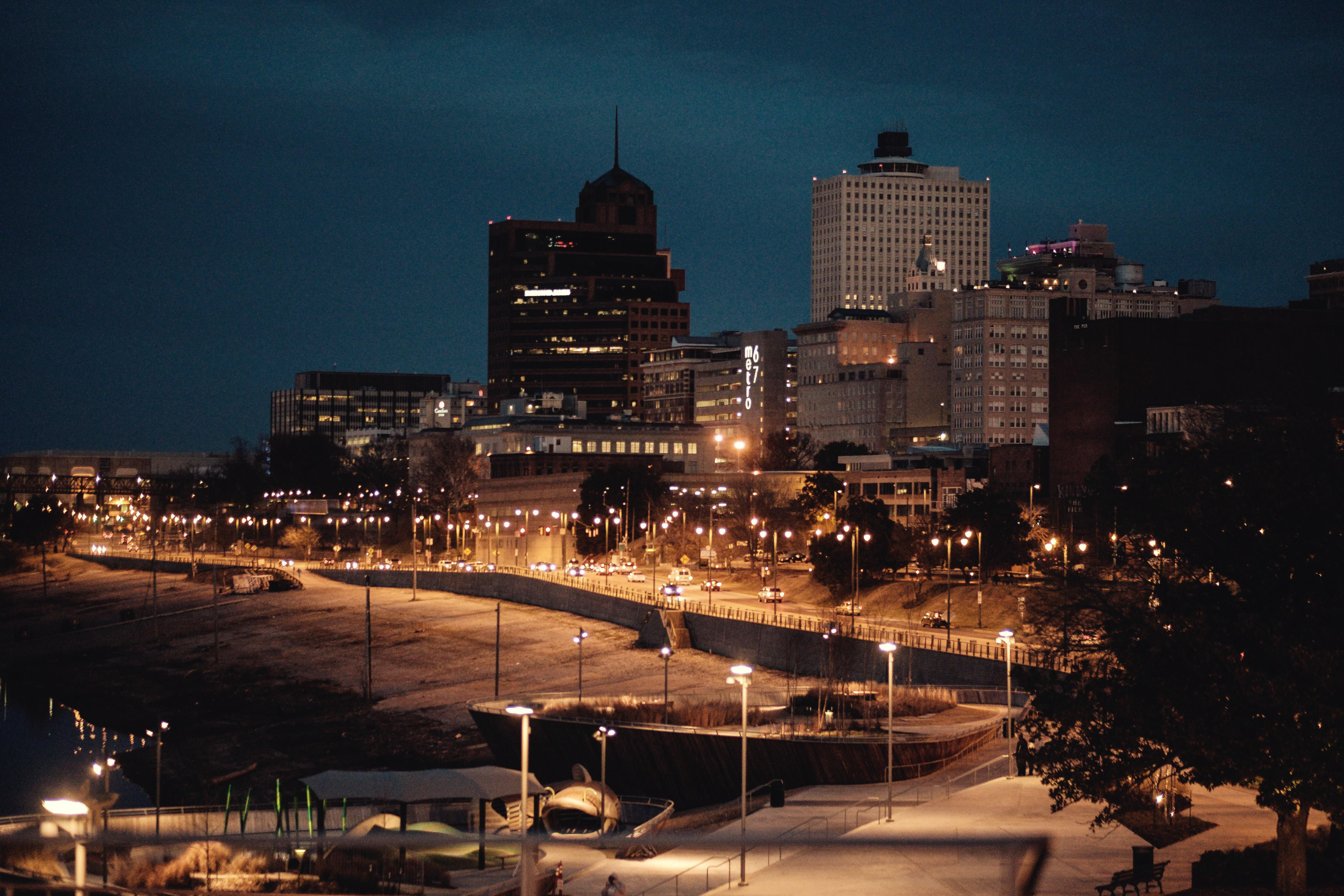
The downtown skyline at night in 2015

On June 2, 2021, the remains of Confederate General and Ku Klux Klan leader Nathan Bedford Forrest were removed from a Memphis park.

On January 7, 2023, after a routine traffic stop, five African American police officers brutally beat a 29-year-old African American man, Tyre Nichols. Nichols died from his injuries in the hospital three days later. Officer body cam footage and local surveillance cameras captured the altercations, which were described as "heinous" and showed "a total lack of regard for human life", according to Memphis police chief Cerelyn "C. J." Davis. The officers were fired and charged with second-degree murder, aggravated kidnapping, and other crimes. The relatively rapid dismissal and prosecution of the offending officers were favorably perceived by Nichols's family, and Davis called it a "blueprint" for future incidents of police brutality nationwide. The incident also resulted in the disbanding of the city's "SCORPION" unit, which had been tasked with directly combating the most violent crimes in the city. All the officers charged with involvement in Nichols's death were members of the unit.

== Geography ==
According to the United States Census Bureau, the city has a total area of 324.0 square miles (839.2 km^{2}), of which 315.1 square miles (816.0 km^{2}) is land and 9.0 square miles (23.2 km^{2}), or 2.76%, is water.

=== Cityscape ===
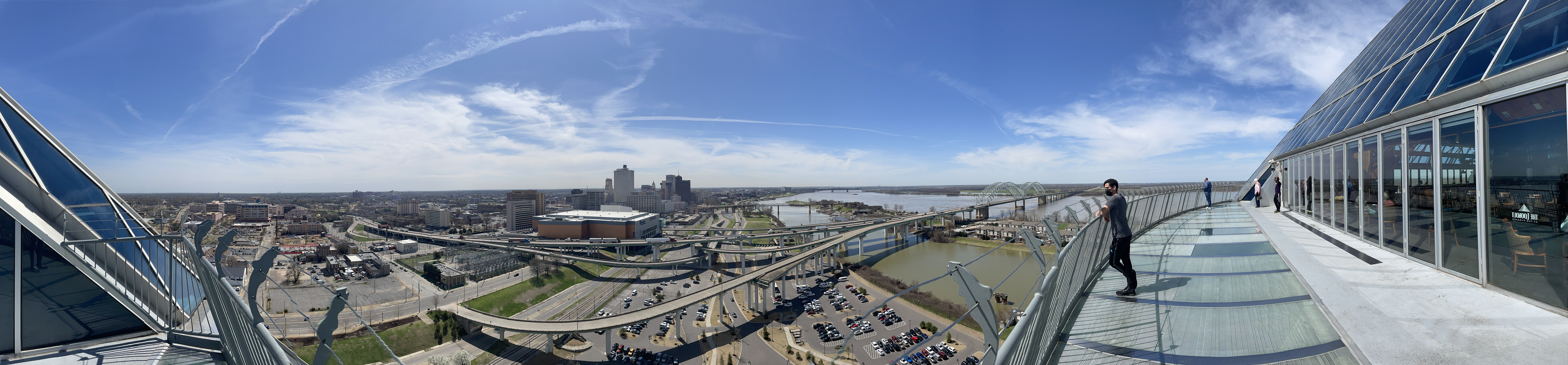
The Downtown skyline from the lookout at the Pyramid facing southwest
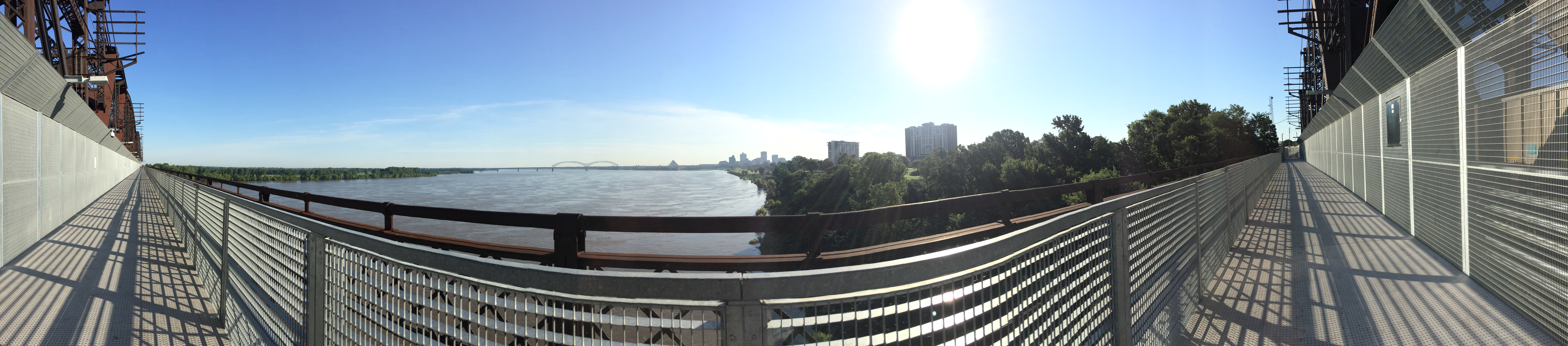
Downtown from the Harahan Bridge

Downtown Memphis rises from a bluff along the Mississippi River. The city and metro area spread out through suburbanization, and encompass southwest Tennessee, northern Mississippi, and eastern Arkansas. Several large parks were founded in the city in the early 20th century, notably Overton Park in Midtown and the 4,500-acre (18 km^{2}) Shelby Farms. The city is a national transportation hub and Mississippi River crossing for Interstate 40, (east-west), Interstate 55 (north-south), barge traffic, Memphis International Airport (FedEx's "SuperHub" facility) and numerous freight railroads that serve the city.

=== Riverfront ===
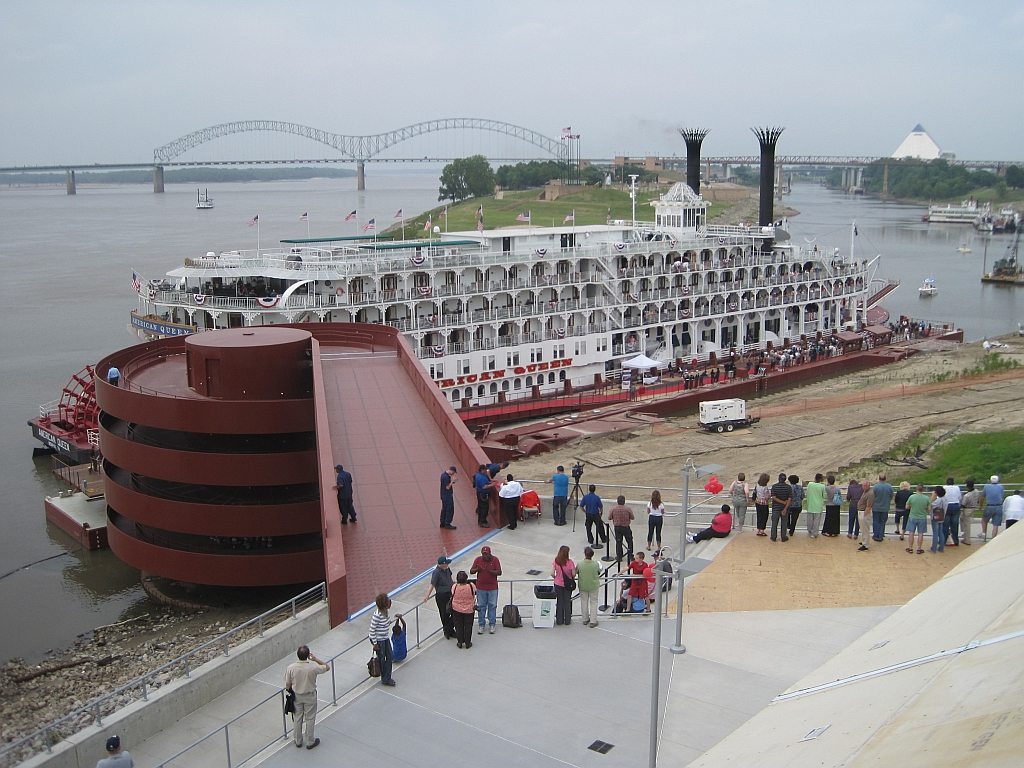
The American Queen docked at Beale Street Landing along the riverfront

The Memphis Riverfront stretches along the Mississippi River from the Meeman-Shelby Forest State Park in the north to the T. O. Fuller State Park in the south. The River Walk is a park system that connects downtown Memphis from Mississippi River Greenbelt Park in the north to Tom Lee Park in the south.

=== Deannexation ===
In recent years, the city has decided to deannex some of its territory. It has gone through a three-phase process to deannex five areas within the city limits, returning them to unincorporated Shelby County. The first phase of deannexation occurred on January 1, 2020, when the Eads and River Bottoms areas returned to county jurisdiction. As a result, the Shelby County Sheriff is responsible for patrolling these former parts of Memphis. The first phase of the deannexation process reduced the city's size by 5% and its population by 0.03%.

=== Aquifer ===
Shelby County is located over four natural aquifers, one of which is recognized as the "Memphis Sand Aquifer" or simply as the "Memphis Aquifer". Located 350 to 1,100 feet (110 to 340 m) underground, this artesian water source is considered soft and estimated by Memphis Light, Gas and Water to contain more than 100 trillion US gallons (380 km^{3}) of water.

==== Cancelled Byhalia Pipeline project ====
The Byhalia Pipeline proposed by Plains All American Pipeline and Valero Energy, and set to begin construction in 2020, was the subject of massive public and legal opposition to the project over concerns regarding possible contamination of the Memphis aquifer. Notable figures voicing public opposition to the project included Memphis Congressman Steve Cohen, Congresswoman Alexandria Ocasio-Cortez, Al Gore, Danny Glover, Giancarlo Esposito, and Jane Fonda.

The pipeline's route, which was set to run through the historic Black Boxtown neighborhood, raised concerns among the projects opponents about the racially disproportionate impacts that contamination from the pipeline would cause if completed.

Construction of the pipeline was cancelled in July 2021 after months of activism and resistance from organizations including Memphis Community Against the Pipeline (MCAP), Protect Our Aquifer, the Memphis and Mid-South Chapter of The Climate Reality Project, and other partnered organizations.

=== Climate ===
Memphis has a humid subtropical climate (Köppen Cfa, Trewartha Cf), with four distinct seasons, and is located in USDA Plant Hardiness Zone 8a in downtown, cooling to 7b for much of the surrounding region. Winter weather comes alternately from the upper Great Plains and the Gulf of Mexico, which can lead to drastic swings in temperature. Summer weather may come from Texas (very hot and humid) or the Gulf (hot and very humid). July has a daily average temperature of 82.8 °F (28.2 °C), with high levels of humidity due to moisture encroaching from the Gulf of Mexico. Afternoon and evening thunderstorms are frequent during summer but usually brief, lasting no longer than an hour. Early autumn is pleasantly drier and mild but can be hot until late October. Late autumn is rainy and cooler; precipitation peaks again in November and December. Winters are mild to chilly, with a January daily average temperature of 42.1 °F (5.6 °C). Snow occurs sporadically in winter, with an average seasonal snowfall of 2.7 inches (6.9 cm). Ice storms and freezing rain pose a greater danger, as they can often pull tree limbs down on power lines and make driving hazardous. Severe thunderstorms can occur at any time of the year, though mainly during the spring months. Large hail, strong winds, flooding, and frequent lightning can accompany these storms. Some storms spawn tornadoes.

The lowest temperature ever recorded in Memphis was −13 °F (−25 °C) on December 24, 1963, and the highest temperature ever was 108 °F (42 °C) on July 13, 1980. Over the course of a year, there is an average of 4.4 days of highs below freezing, 6.9 nights of lows below 20 °F (−7 °C), 43 nights of lows below freezing, 64 days of highs above 90 °F (32 °C), and 2.1 days of highs above 100 °F (38 °C).

Memphis temperatures dropped to -4 F during the 1985 North American cold wave and during the December 1989 United States cold wave.

Annual precipitation is high (54.94 inches [1,400 mm]) and relatively evenly distributed throughout the year. Average monthly rainfall is especially high in March through May and December, while August and September are relatively drier.

Climate data for Memphis (Memphis Int'l), 1991−2020 normals, (Note: Mean monthly maxima and minima (i.e. the expected highest and lowest temperature readings at any point during the year or given month) calculated based on data at said location from 1991 to 2020.) extremes 1875−present (Note: Official records for Memphis were kept at downtown from January 1875 to December 1939 and at Memphis Int'l since January 1940.)
Month	Jan	Feb	Mar	Apr	May	Jun	Jul	Aug	Sep	Oct	Nov	Dec	Year
Record high °F (°C)	79 (26)	81 (27)	87 (31)	94 (34)	99 (37)	104 (40)	108 (42)	107 (42)	103 (39)	98 (37)	86 (30)	81 (27)	108 (42)
Mean maximum °F (°C)	70.5 (21.4)	73.5 (23.1)	80.2 (26.8)	85.3 (29.6)	90.7 (32.6)	95.9 (35.5)	98.1 (36.7)	98.5 (36.9)	95.3 (35.2)	88.5 (31.4)	79.1 (26.2)	71.4 (21.9)	99.9 (37.7)
Mean daily maximum °F (°C)	50.9 (10.5)	55.5 (13.1)	64.2 (17.9)	73.4 (23.0)	81.7 (27.6)	89.4 (31.9)	91.9 (33.3)	91.5 (33.1)	86.0 (30.0)	75.1 (23.9)	62.6 (17.0)	53.4 (11.9)	73.0 (22.8)
Daily mean °F (°C)	42.1 (5.6)	46.1 (7.8)	54.2 (12.3)	63.2 (17.3)	72.1 (22.3)	79.9 (26.6)	82.8 (28.2)	82.1 (27.8)	76.0 (24.4)	64.6 (18.1)	52.7 (11.5)	44.8 (7.1)	63.4 (17.4)
Mean daily minimum °F (°C)	33.3 (0.7)	36.7 (2.6)	44.3 (6.8)	53.0 (11.7)	62.4 (16.9)	70.4 (21.3)	73.6 (23.1)	72.6 (22.6)	65.9 (18.8)	54.0 (12.2)	42.9 (6.1)	36.2 (2.3)	53.8 (12.1)
Mean minimum °F (°C)	16.0 (−8.9)	20.8 (−6.2)	26.3 (−3.2)	37.3 (2.9)	48.4 (9.1)	60.4 (15.8)	67.0 (19.4)	64.8 (18.2)	52.4 (11.3)	38.0 (3.3)	27.3 (−2.6)	21.1 (−6.1)	13.6 (−10.2)
Record low °F (°C)	−8 (−22)	−11 (−24)	12 (−11)	27 (−3)	36 (2)	48 (9)	52 (11)	48 (9)	36 (2)	25 (−4)	9 (−13)	−13 (−25)	−13 (−25)
Average precipitation inches (mm)	4.14 (105)	4.55 (116)	5.74 (146)	5.87 (149)	5.27 (134)	3.99 (101)	4.82 (122)	3.37 (86)	3.03 (77)	3.98 (101)	4.69 (119)	5.49 (139)	54.94 (1,395)
Average snowfall inches (cm)	0.9 (2.3)	1.0 (2.5)	0.5 (1.3)	0.0 (0.0)	0.0 (0.0)	0.0 (0.0)	0.0 (0.0)	0.0 (0.0)	0.0 (0.0)	0.0 (0.0)	0.1 (0.25)	0.2 (0.51)	2.7 (6.9)
Average precipitation days (≥ 0.01 in)	10.0	9.9	11.5	9.6	10.6	8.9	9.5	7.6	7.1	7.5	9.0	10.2	111.4
Average snowy days (≥ 0.1 in)	1.0	0.8	0.3	0.0	0.0	0.0	0.0	0.0	0.0	0.0	0.2	0.3	2.6
Average relative humidity (%)	68.2	66.4	63.2	62.5	66.4	66.8	69.1	69.6	71.3	66.2	67.7	68.8	67.2
Average dew point °F (°C)	28.6 (−1.9)	31.8 (−0.1)	39.4 (4.1)	48.6 (9.2)	58.3 (14.6)	65.7 (18.7)	70.0 (21.1)	68.5 (20.3)	63.1 (17.3)	50.2 (10.1)	41.0 (5.0)	32.7 (0.4)	49.8 (9.9)
Mean monthly sunshine hours	166.6	173.8	215.3	254.6	301.5	320.6	326.9	307.0	251.2	245.9	173.0	151.9	2,888.3
Percentage possible sunshine	53	57	58	65	69	74	74	74	68	70	56	50	65
Average ultraviolet index	2.4	3.7	5.6	7.5	8.8	9.5	9.7	8.8	7.1	4.8	3.0	2.2	6.0
Source 1: NOAA (relative humidity and dew point 1961−1990, sun 1961−1987)
Source 2: UV Index Today (1995 to 2022)

== Demographics ==
Historical population
Census	Pop.	Note	%±
1840	3,360		—
1850	8,841		163.1%
1860	22,623		155.9%
1870	40,226		77.8%
1880	33,592		−16.5%
1890	64,495		92.0%
1900	102,320		58.6%
1910	131,105		28.1%
1920	162,351		23.8%
1930	253,143		55.9%
1940	292,942		15.7%
1950	396,000		35.2%
1960	497,524		25.6%
1970	623,988		25.4%
1980	646,174		3.6%
1990	610,337		−5.5%
2000	650,100		6.5%
2010	646,889		−0.5%
2020	633,104		−2.1%
2025 (est.)	609,647	▼	−3.7%
U.S. Decennial Census; 2010–2020

=== Racial and ethnic composition ===
For historical population data, see: History of Memphis, Tennessee.

Historical Racial composition	2020	2010	1990	1970	1950
White	27.1%	29.4%	44.0%	60.8%	62.8%
—Non-Hispanic	24.0%	27.5%	43.7%	60.5% (Note: From 15% sample)	n/a
Black or African American	61.2%	63.3%	54.8%	38.9%	37.2%
Hispanic or Latino (of any race)	9.8%	6.5%	0.7%	0.4%	n/a
Asian	1.8%	1.6%	0.8%	0.2%	–

Memphis city, Tennessee – Racial and ethnic composition Note: the US Census treats Hispanic/Latino as an ethnic category. This table excludes Latinos from the racial categories and assigns them to a separate category. Hispanics/Latinos may be of any race.
Race / Ethnicity (NH = Non-Hispanic)	Pop 1980	Pop 1990	Pop 2000	Pop 2010	Pop 2020	% 1980	% 1990	% 2000	% 2010	% 2020
White alone (NH)	331,779	266,490	216,174	177,735	151,581	51.33%	43.66%	33.25%	27.48%	23.94%
Black or African American alone (NH)	304,958	333,602	397,732	408,075	387,964	47.18%	54.66%	61.18%	63.08%	61.28%
Native American or Alaska Native alone (NH)	530	931	1,009	1,186	1,007	0.08%	0.15%	0.16%	0.18%	0.16%
Asian alone (NH)	2,701	4,653	9,373	10,067	11,503	0.42%	0.76%	1.44%	1.56%	1.82%
Native Hawaiian or Pacific Islander alone (NH)	x	x	162	159	141	x	x	0.02%	0.02%	0.02%
Other race alone (NH)	1,163	206	697	742	2,425	0.18%	0.03%	0.11%	0.11%	0.38%
Mixed race or Multiracial (NH)	x	x	5,636	6,931	16,316	x	x	0.87%	1.07%	2.58%
Hispanic or Latino (any race)	5,225	4,455	19,317	41,994	62,167	0.81%	0.73%	2.97%	6.49%	9.82%
Total	646,356	610,337	650,100	646,889	633,104	100.00%	100.00%	100.00%	100.00%	100.00%

=== 2020 census ===
As of the 2020 census, Memphis had a population of 633,104. The median age was 35.0 years. 23.9% of residents were under the age of 18 and 13.9% of residents were 65 years of age or older. For every 100 females there were 89.8 males, and for every 100 females age 18 and over there were 85.8 males age 18 and over.

There were 255,642 households in Memphis, of which 29.6% had children under the age of 18 living in them. Of all households, 27.3% were married-couple households, 23.3% were households with a male householder and no spouse or partner present, and 42.2% were households with a female householder and no spouse or partner present. About 34.6% of all households were made up of individuals and 11.0% had someone living alone who was 65 years of age or older.

There were 286,713 dwelling units, of which 10.8% were vacant. The homeowner vacancy rate was 1.2%, and the rental vacancy rate was 9.9%.

99.8% of residents lived in urban areas, while 0.2% lived in rural areas.

In a reverse trend of the Great Migration, a growing number of African Americans are leaving Memphis to move into the suburbs of DeSoto and Shelby counties. However, as of 2023, Memphis remains one of the largest majority African American cities in the nation.

=== 2010 census ===
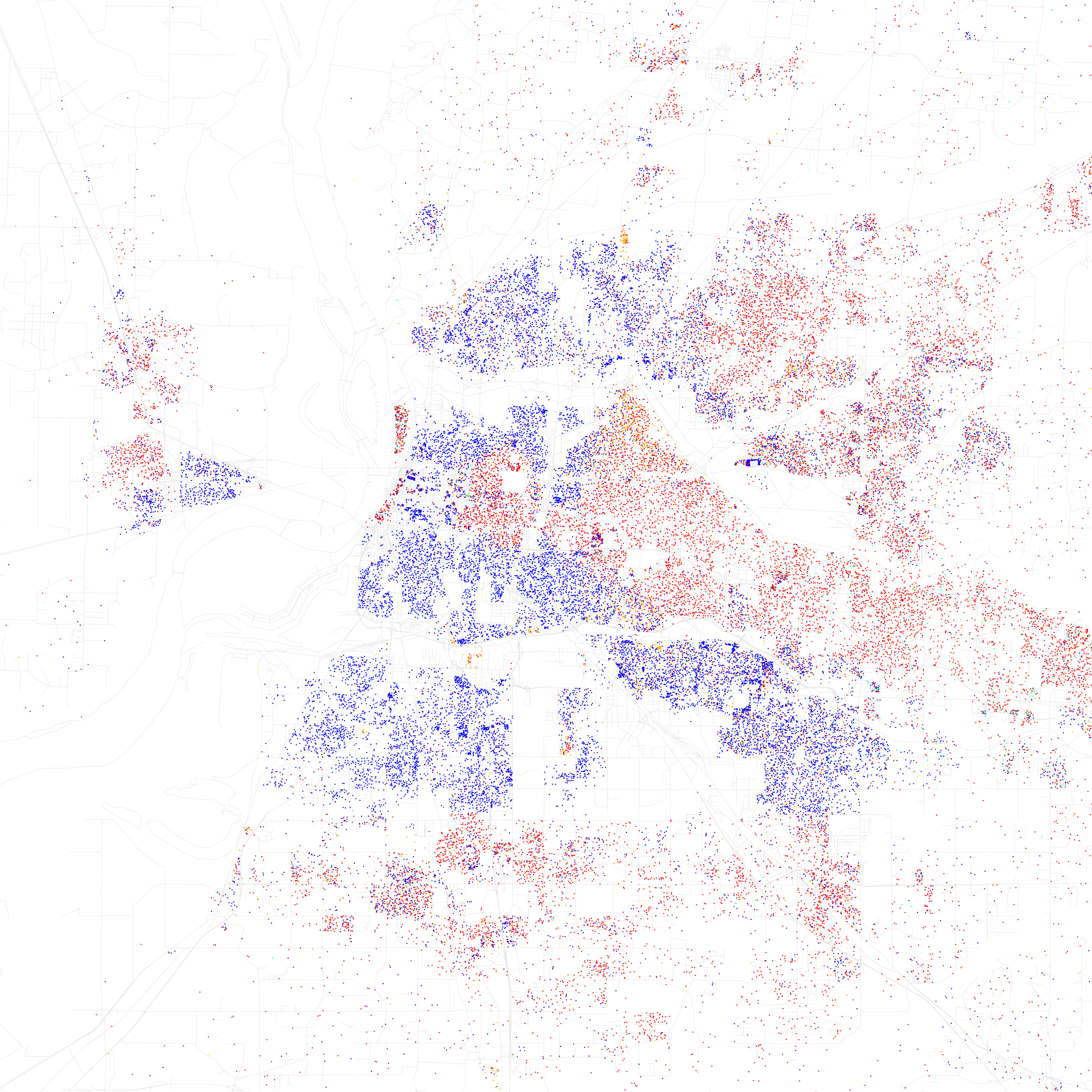
Map of racial distribution in Memphis, 2010 U.S. Census. Each dot is 25 people: ⬤ White ⬤ Black ⬤ Asian ⬤ Hispanic ⬤ Other

As of the 2010 United States census, there were 652,078 people and 245,836 households in the city. The population density was 2,327.4 people per sq mi (898.6/km^{2}). There were 271,552 housing units at an average density of 972.2 per square mile (375.4/km^{2}). The racial makeup of the city was 63.33% African American, 29.39% White, 1.46% Asian American, 1.57% Native American, 0.04% Pacific Islander, 1.45% from other races, and 1.04% from two or more races. Hispanic or Latino people of any race were 6.49% of the population.

The median income for a household in the city was $32,285, and the median income for a family was $37,767. Males had a median income of $31,236 versus $25,183 for females. The per capita income for the city was $17,838. About 17.2% of families and 20.6% of the population were below the poverty line, including 30.1% of those under age 18, and 15.4% of those age 65 or over. In 2011, the U.S. Census Bureau ranked the Memphis area as the poorest large metro area in the country. Jeff Wallace of the University of Memphis noted that the problem was related to decades of segregation in government and schools. He said that it was a low-cost job market, but other places in the world could offer cheaper labor, and the workforce was undereducated for today's challenges.

The Memphis Metropolitan Statistical Area (MSA), the 42nd largest in the United States, has a 2010 population of 1,316,100 and includes the Tennessee counties of Shelby, Tipton and Fayette; as well as the northern Mississippi counties of DeSoto, Marshall, Tate, and Tunica; and Crittenden County, Arkansas, all part of the Mississippi Delta.

The total metropolitan area has a higher proportion of whites and a higher per capita income than the population in the city. The 2010 census shows that the Memphis metro area is close to a majority-minority population:

the white population is 47.9 percent of the eight-county area's 1,316,100 residents. The non-Hispanic white population, a designation frequently used in census reports, was 46.2 percent of the total. The African American percentage was 45.7. For several decades, the Memphis metro area has had the highest percentage of black population among the nation's large metropolitan areas. The area has seemed on a path to become the nation's first metro area of one million or more with a majority black population.

The top countries of origin for Memphis' immigrants in 2015 were Mexico, India, China, Honduras and Vietnam.

=== Religion ===
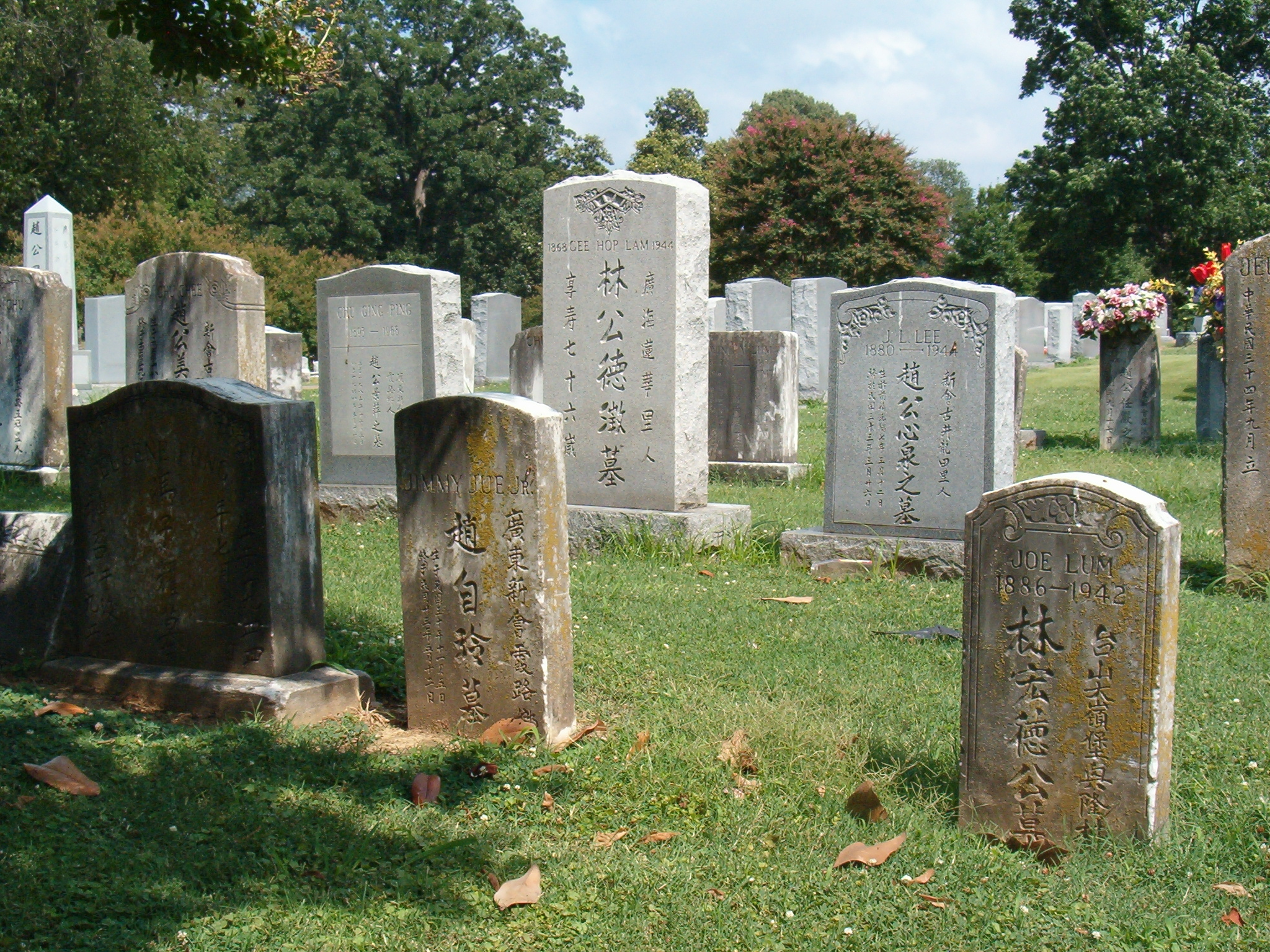
Asian-American tombstones in Elmwood Cemetery

An 1870 map of Memphis shows religious buildings of the Baptist, Catholic, Episcopal, Methodist, Presbyterian, Congregational, and other Christian denominations, and a Jewish congregation. In 2009, places of worship exist for Christians, Jews, Hindus, Buddhists, and Muslims.

The international headquarters of the Church of God in Christ, the largest Pentecostal denomination in the United States, is located in Memphis. Its Mason Temple was named after the denomination's founder, Charles Harrison Mason. This auditorium is where Rev. Martin Luther King Jr. gave his noted "I've Been to the Mountaintop" speech in April 1968, the night before he was assassinated at his motel. The National Civil Rights Museum, located in Memphis at the Lorraine Motel and other buildings, has an annual ceremony at Mason's Temple of Deliverance where it honors people with Freedom Awards.

Bellevue Baptist Church is a Southern Baptist megachurch in Memphis that was founded in 1903. Its current membership is around 30,000. For many years, it was led by Adrian Rogers, a three-term president of the Southern Baptist Convention.

Other notable and/or large churches in Memphis include Second Presbyterian Church (EPC), Highpoint Church (SBC), Hope Presbyterian Church (EPC), Evergreen Presbyterian Church (PCUSA), Colonial Park United Methodist Church, Christ United Methodist Church, Idlewild Presbyterian Church (PCUSA), GraceLife Pentecostal Church (UPCI), First Baptist Broad, Temple of Deliverance, Calvary Episcopal Church, the Church of the River (First Unitarian Church of Memphis), First Congregational Church (UCC) and Annunciation Greek Orthodox Church.

Memphis is home to two cathedrals. The Cathedral of the Immaculate Conception is the seat of the Roman Catholic Diocese of Memphis, and St. Mary's Episcopal Cathedral is the seat of the Episcopal Diocese of West Tennessee.

Memphis is home to Temple Israel, a Reform synagogue that has approximately 7,000 members, making it one of the largest Reform synagogues in the country. Baron Hirsch Synagogue is the largest Orthodox shul in the United States. Jewish residents were part of the city before the Civil War, but more Jewish immigrants came from Eastern Europe in the late 19th and early 20th centuries.

Memphis is home to an estimated 10,000 to 15,000 Muslims of various cultures and ethnicities.

A number of seminaries are located in Memphis and the metropolitan area. Memphis is home to Memphis Theological Seminary and Harding School of Theology. Suburban Cordova is home to Mid-America Baptist Theological Seminary.

=== Crime and police ===
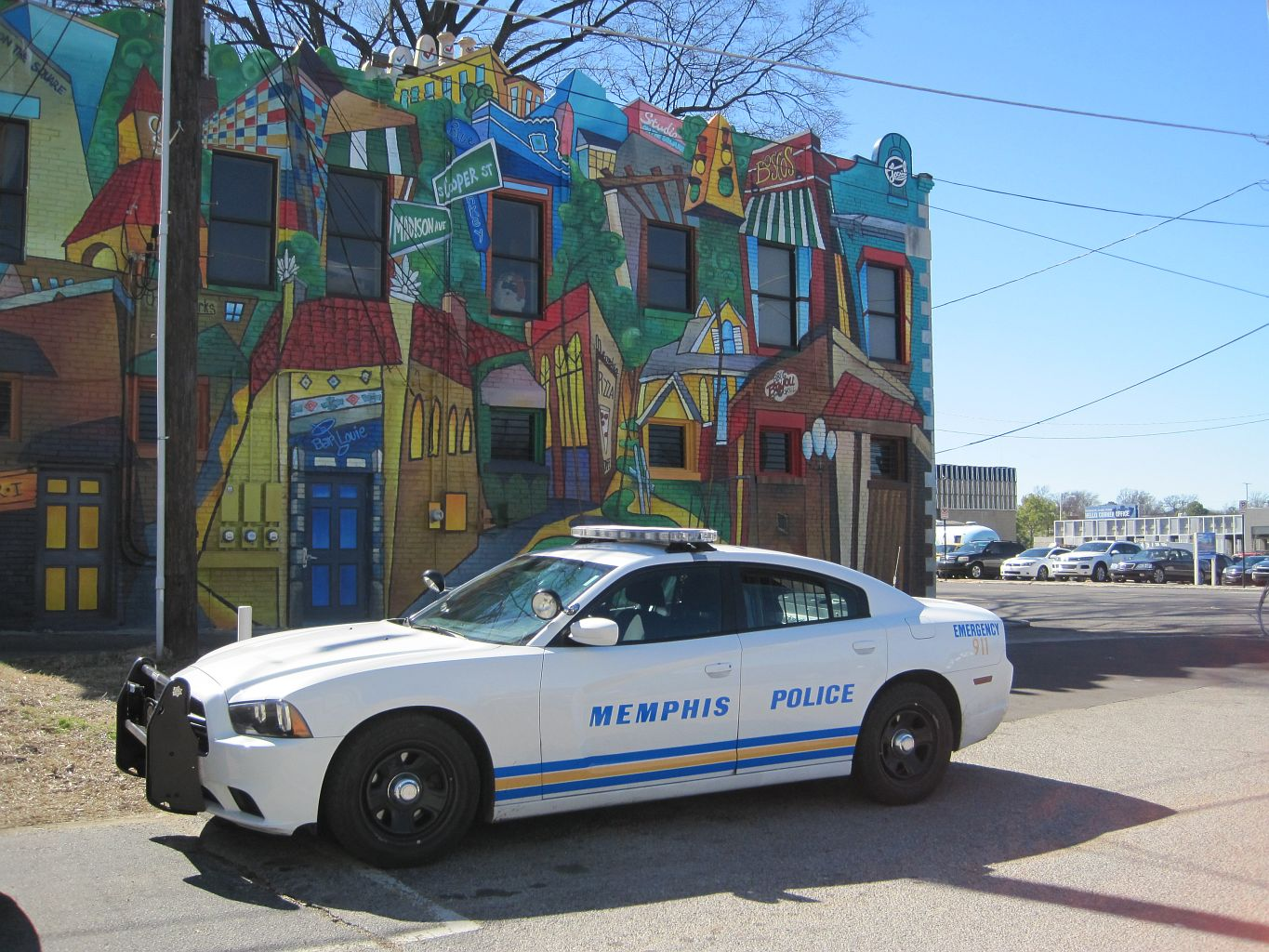
A Memphis Police Department vehicle

In the 21st century, Memphis' crime rate has remained significantly higher than the national average. Memphis' gangs are a major reason for the crime crisis in the city. Since the 2000s, it has consistently been recognized as one of the most dangerous cities in the U.S.

In 2023, Memphis set a homicide record with 397 homicides. New York City, the nation's largest city with a population (8.5 million) 13 times larger than Memphis, had a lower homicide count of 386 in 2023. Identity theft, carjackings and robberies were also happening at a highly concerning rate in the city after 2020. Crime was the primary reason 30,000 former Memphis residents decided to relocate outside the city between 2017 and 2022. Memphis' businesses are also leaving the city or closing down at a high rate due to rampant crime. Memphis' leaders are continually discussing and implementing strategies such as recruiting more police officers to hopefully lower crime in the city. However, on September 9, 2025, it was revealed that crime in Memphis had in fact dropped to a 25-year low across major categories. On September 15, 2025, president Trump signed a order to mobilize federal law enforcement agents, including FBI, and to deploy the Tennessee National Guard to Memphis. Some members of the Memphis city council, including Memphis mayor Paul Young, opposed the plan. The federal government deployed the Memphis Safe Task Force to Memphis in October 2025. Preliminary figures from the MPD for 2026 showed crime had continued to trend downward, with all major crimes down 44% and murders down from 110 to 62 through June

== Economy ==
The city's central geographic location has aided its business development. On the Mississippi River and intersected by five major freight railroads and two Interstate Highways, I-40 and I-55, Memphis is well positioned for commerce in the transportation and shipping industry. Its access by water was key to its initial development, with steamboats plying the Mississippi river. Railroad construction strengthened its connection to other markets to the east and west.

Since the second half of the 20th century, highways and interstates have played major roles as transportation corridors. A third interstate, I-69, is under construction, and a fourth, I-22, has recently been designated from the former High Priority Corridor X. River barges are unloaded onto trucks and trains. The city is home to Memphis International Airport, the world's busiest cargo airport, surpassing Hong Kong International Airport in 2021. Memphis serves as a primary hub for FedEx Express shipping.

As of 2014, Memphis was the home of three Fortune 500 companies: FedEx (no. 63), International Paper (no. 107), and AutoZone (no. 306).

Other major corporations based in Memphis include Allenberg Cotton, American Residential Services (also known as ARS/Rescue Rooter); Baker, Donelson, Bearman, Caldwell & Berkowitz; Cargill Cotton, City Gear, First Horizon National Corporation, Fred's, GTx, Lenny's Sub Shop, Mid-America Apartments, Perkins Restaurant and Bakery, ServiceMaster, True Temper Sports, Varsity Brands, and Verso Paper. Corporations with major operations based in Memphis include Gibson guitars (based in Nashville) and Smith & Nephew.

The Federal Reserve Bank of St. Louis also has a branch in Memphis.

The entertainment and film industries have discovered Memphis in recent years. Several major motion pictures, most of which were recruited and assisted by the Memphis & Shelby County Film and Television Commission, have been filmed in Memphis, including Making the Grade (1984), Elvis and Me (1988), Great Balls of Fire! (1988), Heart of Dixie (1989), Mystery Train (1989), The Silence of the Lambs (1991), Trespass (1992), The Gun in Betty Lou's Handbag (1992), The Firm (1993), The Delta (1996), The People Vs. Larry Flynt (1996), The Rainmaker (1997), Cast Away (2000), 21 Grams (2002), A Painted House (2002), Hustle & Flow (2005), Forty Shades of Blue (2005), Walk the Line (2005), Black Snake Moan (2007), Nothing But the Truth (2008), Soul Men (2008), and The Grace Card (2011). The Blind Side (2009) was set in Memphis but filmed in Atlanta. The 1992 television movie Memphis, starring Memphis native Cybill Shepherd, who also served as executive producer and writer, was also filmed in Memphis.

== Arts and culture ==
=== Cultural events ===
One of the largest celebrations of the city is Memphis in May. The month-long series of events promotes Memphis's heritage and outreach of its people far beyond the city's borders. The four main events are the Beale Street Music Festival, International Week, The World Championship Barbecue Cooking Contest, and the Great River Run. The World Championship Barbecue Cooking Contest is the largest pork barbecue-cooking contest in the world.

In April, downtown Memphis celebrates the "Africa in April Cultural Awareness Festival," or simply Africa in April. The festival was designed to celebrate the arts, history, culture, and diversity of the African diaspora. Africa in April is a three-day festival with vendors' markets, fashion showcases, blues showcases, and an international diversity parade.

During late May-early June, Memphis is home to the Memphis Italian Festival at Marquette Park. The 2019 festival will be its 30th and has hosted musical acts, local artisans, and Italian cooking competitions. It also presents chef demonstrations, the Coors Light Competitive Bocce Tournament, the Galtelli Cup Recreational Bocce Tournament, a volleyball tournament, and pizza-tossing demonstrations. This festival was started by Holy Rosary School and Parish and began inside the School parking lot in 1989. The Memphis Italian Festival is run almost completely by former and current Holy Rosary School and Church members and begins with a 5K run each year.

Carnival Memphis, formerly known as the Memphis Cotton Carnival, is an annual series of parties and festivities in June that salutes various aspects of Memphis and its industries. An annual King and Queen of Carnival are secretly selected to reign over Carnival activities. From 1935 to 1982, the African-American community staged the Cotton Makers Jubilee; it has merged with Carnival Memphis.

A market and arts festival, the Cooper-Young Festival, is held annually in September in the Cooper-Young district of Midtown Memphis. The event draws artists from all over North America and includes local music, art sales, contests, and displays.

Memphis sponsors several film festivals: the Indie Memphis Film Festival, Outflix, and the Memphis International Film and Music Festival. The Indie Memphis Film Festival is in its 14th year and was held April 27–28, 2013. Recognized by MovieMaker Magazine as one of 25 "Coolest Film Festivals" (2009) and one of 25 "Festivals Worth the Entry Fee" (2011), Indie Memphis offers Memphis year-round independent film programming, including the Global Lens international film series, IM Student Shorts student films, and an outdoor concert film series at the historic Levitt Shell. The Outflix Film Festival, also in its 15th year, was held September 7–13, 2013. Outflix features a full week of LGBT cinema, including short films, features, and documentaries. The Memphis International Film and Music Festival is held in April; it is in its 11th year and takes place at Malco's Ridgeway Four.

Mid-South Pride is Tennessee's second-largest LGBT pride event.

On the weekend before Thanksgiving, the Memphis International Jazz Festival is held in the South Main Historic Arts District in Downtown Memphis. This festival promotes the important role Memphis has played in shaping Jazz nationally and internationally. Acts such as George Coleman, Herman Green, Kirk Whalum and Marvin Stamm all come out of the rich musical heritage in Memphis.

Formerly titled the W. C. Handy Awards, the International Blues Awards are presented by the Blues Foundation (headquartered in Memphis) for blues music achievement. Weeklong playing competitions are held, as well as an awards banquet including a night of performance and celebration.

=== Music ===
Memphis is the home of founders and pioneers of various American music genres, including Memphis soul, Memphis blues, gospel, rock n' roll, rockabilly, Memphis rap, Buck, crunk, and "sharecropper" country music (in contrast to the "rhinestone" country sound historically associated with Nashville).

Many musicians, including Aretha Franklin, Elvis Presley, Johnny Cash, Jerry Lee Lewis, Carl Perkins, Roy Orbison, Booker T. & the M.G.'s, Otis Redding, Isaac Hayes, Shawn Lane, Al Green, Bobby Whitlock, Rance Allen, Percy Sledge, Solomon Burke, William Bell, Sam & Dave and B.B. King, got their start in Memphis in the 1950s and 1960s.

Beale Street is a national historical landmark and shows the impact Memphis has had on American blues, particularly after World War II as electric guitars took precedence over the original acoustic sound from the Mississippi Delta. Sam Phillips' Sun Studio still stands and is open for tours. Elvis, Johnny Cash, Jerry Lee Lewis, Carl Perkins and Roy Orbison all made their first recordings there and were "discovered" by Phillips. Many great blues artists recorded there, such as W. C. Handy, the "Father of the Blues".

Stax Records created a classic 1960s soul music sound, much grittier and horn-based than the better-known Motown from Detroit. Booker T. and the M.G.'s were the label's backing band for most of the classic hits that came from Stax, by Sam & Dave, Otis Redding, Wilson Pickett and many more. The sound was revisited in the 1980s in the Blues Brothers movie, in which many of the musicians starred as themselves.

Memphis is also noted for its influence on the power pop musical genre in the 1970s. Notable bands and musicians include Big Star, Chris Bell, Alex Chilton, Tommy Hoehn, The Scruffs and Prix.

Memphis rap culture significantly influenced hip-hop culture worldwide. Memphis hip-hop became more mainstream during the 2000s. Memphis-based artists such as Three 6 Mafia, Juicy J, Lil Wyte, 8Ball & MJG, Gangsta Boo, Project Pat, La Chat, Young Dolph, Yo Gotti, NLE Choppa, Moneybagg Yo, GloRilla, Pooh Shiesty, and Key Glock is among the most popular emcees in the nation.

Several notable singers are from the Memphis area, including Justin Timberlake, K. Michelle, Kirk Whalum, Ruth Welting, Kid Memphis, Kallen Esperian, Julien Baker, and Andrew VanWyngarden. The Metropolitan Opera of New York had its first tour in Memphis in 1906; in the 1990s it decided to tour only larger cities. Metropolitan Opera performances are now broadcast in HD at local movie theaters across the country.

=== Cuisine ===
Memphis is the home of Memphis-style barbecue, which is one of four predominant regional styles of barbecue in the United States. Memphis-style barbecue has become well known due to the World Championship Barbecue Cooking Contest held each May, which has been listed in Guinness World Records as the largest pork barbecue contest in the world. Notable Memphis restaurants include:

- Alcenia's, a soul food restaurant that has been featured on Food Network and the Travel Channel
- Charlie Vergos' Rendezvous, founded in 1948, this barbecue restaurant located in an alley has been visited by countless celebrities
- Chef Tam's Underground Cafe, operated by Chef Tamra Patterson, winner of Guy's Grocery Games in 2018 and Chopped in 2022
- Dyer's Burgers, which has used the same grease to deep-fry their burgers for over 100 years
- Earnestine and Hazel's, a historic dive bar visited previously by the likes of B.B. King, Aretha Franklin, and Tina Turner
- In addition to barbecue, the cuisine of Memphis is also defined by:
  - Fried chicken, such as that from Gus's World Famous Fried Chicken, a restaurant founded in nearby Mason, Tennessee in 1953 and has since expanded to over 35 locations
  - Chicken wings, served with Honey Gold, a sweet and spicy sauce made with honey, mustard, and cayenne

=== Visual art ===
In addition to the Brooks Museum and Dixon Gallery and Gardens, Memphis plays host to two developing visual art areas, one city-sanctioned and the other organically formed.

The South Main Arts District is an arts neighborhood in south downtown. Over the past 20 years, the area has morphed from a derelict brothel and juke joint neighborhood to a gentrified, well-lit area sponsoring "Trolley Night", when arts patrons stroll down the street to see fire spinners, DJs playing in front of clubs, specialty shops and galleries. Not far from the South Main Arts district is Medicine Factory, an artist-run organization.

Another developing arts district in Memphis is Broad Avenue. This east–west avenue is undergoing neighborhood revitalization from the influx of craft and visual artists taking up residence and studios in the area. An art professor from Rhodes College holds small openings on the first floor of his home for local students and professional artists. Odessa, another art space on Broad Avenue, hosts student art shows and local electronic music. Other gallery spaces spring up for semi-annual artwalks.

Memphis also has non-commercial visual arts organizations and spaces, including local painter Pinkney Herbert's Marshall Arts gallery, on Marshall Avenue near Sun Studios, another arts neighborhood characterized by affordable rent.

=== Literature ===
Well-known writers from Memphis include Shelby Foote, the noted Civil War historian. Novelist John Grisham grew up in nearby DeSoto County, Mississippi, and sets many of his books in Memphis.

Many works of fiction and literature are set in Memphis. These include The Reivers by William Faulkner (1962), September, September by Shelby Foote (1977); Peter Taylor's The Old Forest and Other Stories (1985), and his Pulitzer Prize-winning A Summons to Memphis (1986); The Firm (1991) and The Client (1993), both by John Grisham; Memphis Afternoons: a Memoir by James Conaway (1993); Plague of Dreamers by Steve Stern (1997); Cassina Gambrel Was Missing by William Watkins (1999); The Guardian by Beecher Smith (1999); "We are Billion-Year-Old Carbon" by Corey Mesler (2005); The Silence of the Lambs by Thomas Harris; and The Architect by James Williamson (2007).

=== Tourism ===
==== Points of interest ====
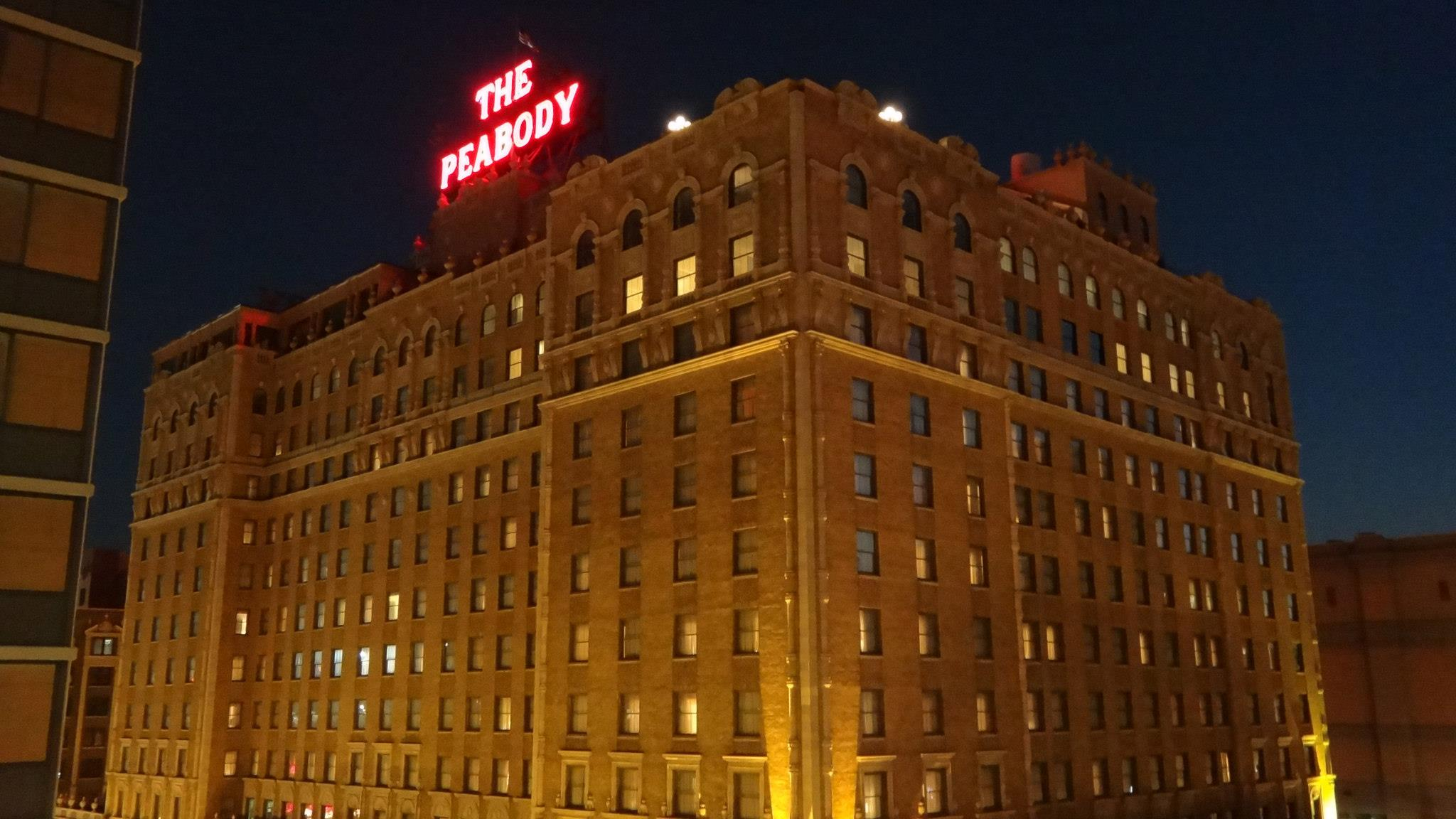
Peabody Hotel

- Beale Street – a significant location in the city's history, as well as in the history of the blues. Street performers play live music, and bars and clubs feature live entertainment.
- Graceland – the private residence of Elvis Presley
- Memphis Zoo – features exhibits of mammals, birds, fish, and amphibians
- Peabody Hotel – known for the "Peabody Ducks" on the hotel rooftop
- Sun Studio – a recording studio opened in 1950; it now also contains a museum
- Orpheum Theatre – features Broadway shows, Ballet Memphis and Opera Memphis
- The New Daisy Theatre – concert venue located on Beale Street
- Mud Island Amphitheatre – concert venue
- Memphis Pyramid – location of the largest Bass Pro Shops in the world, an observation deck, restaurants, bowling alley, aquarium, and hotel

Other Memphis attractions include the Simmons Bank Liberty Stadium, FedExForum, and Mississippi riverboat day cruises.

==== Museums and art collections ====
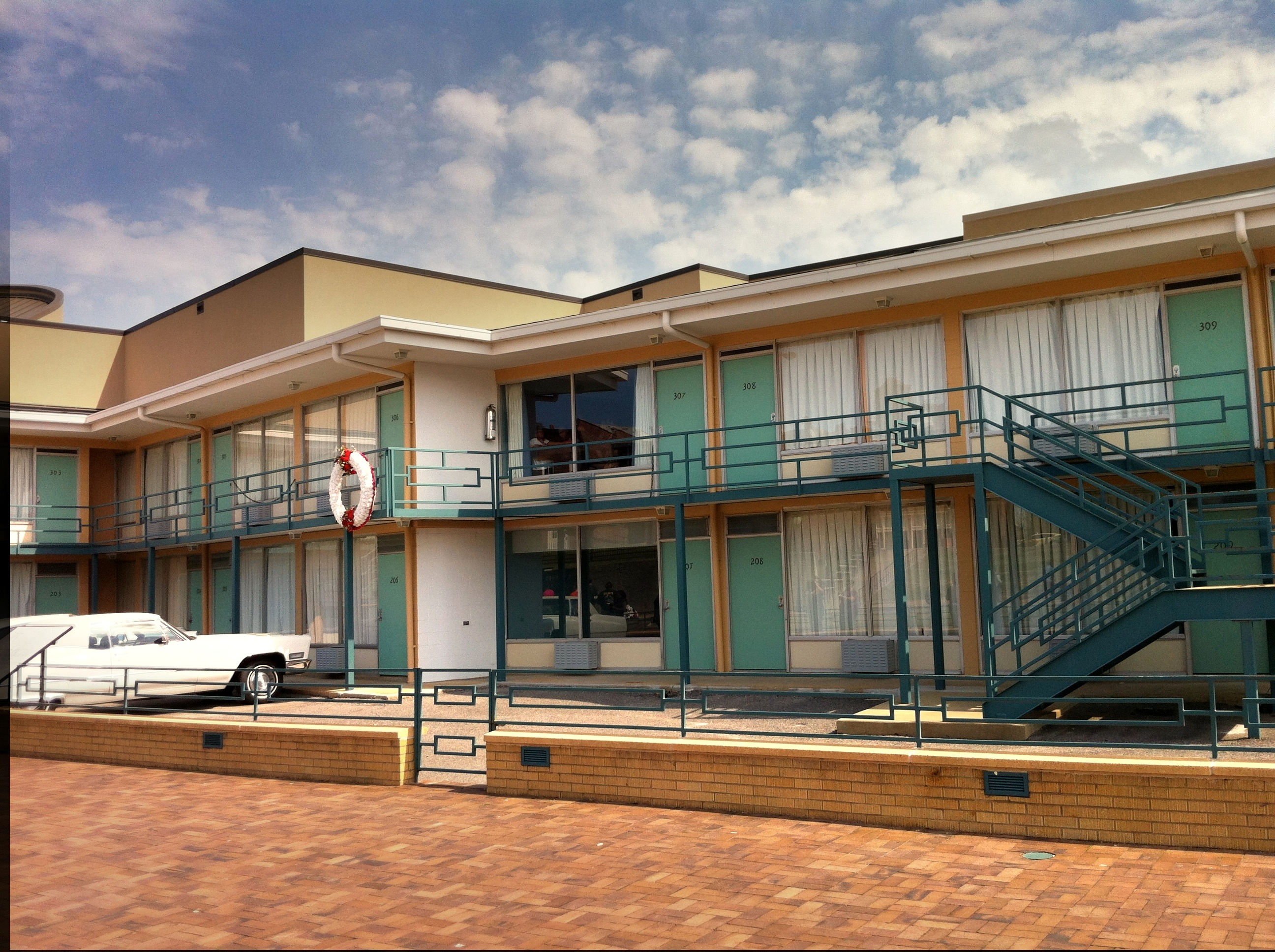
National Civil Rights Museum at the Lorraine Motel in Memphis

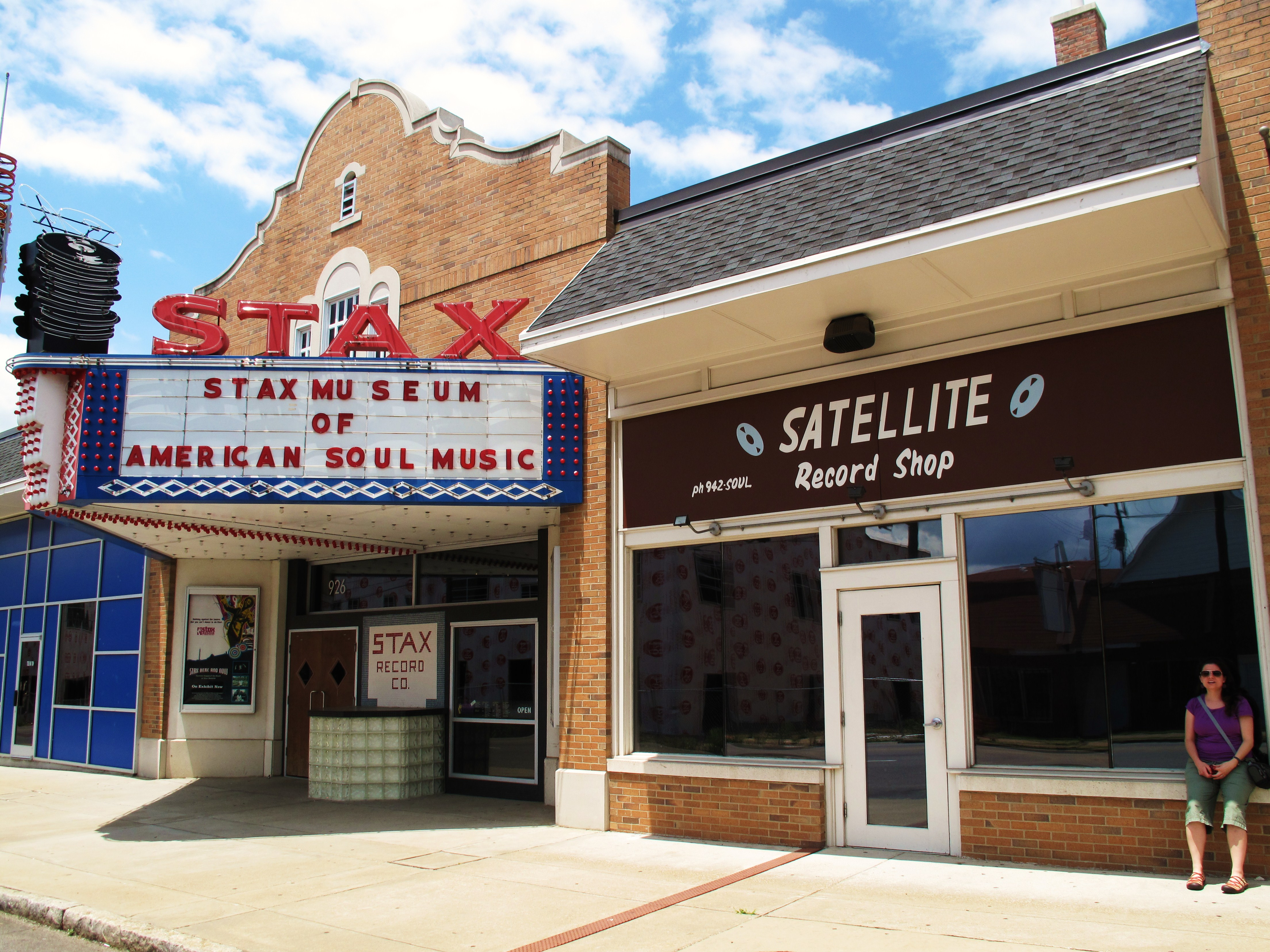
Stax Museum and Satellite Record Shop

- National Civil Rights Museum – located in the Lorraine Motel and related buildings, where Martin Luther King Jr. was assassinated. It includes a historical overview of the American civil rights movement and an interpretation of historic and current issues.
- Memphis Brooks Museum of Art – the oldest and largest fine art museum in Tennessee; the collection includes Renaissance, Baroque, Impressionist, and 20th-century artists.
- Belz Museum of Asian and Judaic Art – contains a large collection of Asian jade art, Asian art, and Judaic art.
- Dixon Gallery and Gardens – focuses on French and American impressionism and contains the Stout Collection of 18th-century German porcelain, as well as a 17-acre (6.9 ha) public garden.
- Children's Museum of Memphis – exhibits interactive and educational activities for children.
- Graceland – the home of Elvis Presley, it attracts over 600,000 visitors annually and features two of Presley's airplanes, his automobile and motorcycle collection, and other memorabilia. Graceland is listed on the National Register of Historic Places.
- Pink Palace Museum and Planetarium – a science and historical museum; it includes the third largest planetarium in the United States and an IMAX theater.
- Beale Street – a public exhibit honoring Memphis musicians, singers, writers and composers.
- Mississippi River Museum – a maritime museum on Mud Island that focuses on the history of the Mississippi River.
- Victorian Village – a historic district featuring Victorian-era mansions, some of which are open to the public as museums.
- The Cotton Museum – located on the old trading floor of the Memphis Cotton Exchange.
- Metal Museum – features exhibitions of metalwork and public programs featuring metalsmiths.
- Stax Museum – the former location of Stax Records.
- Chucalissa Indian Village – a Walls phase mound and plaza complex operated by the University of Memphis. The village is listed on the National Register of Historic Places, and is a National Historic Landmark. The Southeast Indian Heritage Festival is held there annually.
- Burkle Estate – a historic home now used as a museum of slavery and the anti-slavery movement.

==== Cemeteries ====
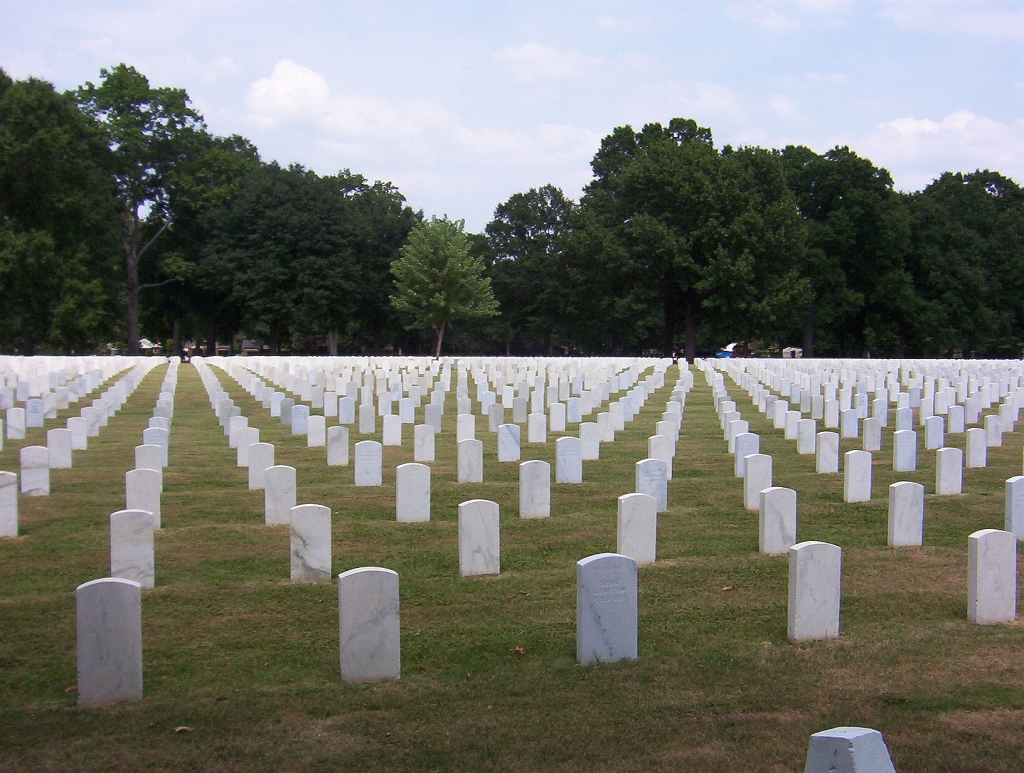
Memphis National Cemetery

The Memphis National Cemetery is a United States National Cemetery located in northeastern Memphis.

Historic Elmwood Cemetery is one of the oldest rural garden cemeteries in the South, and contains the Carlisle S. Page Arboretum. Memorial Park Cemetery is noted for its sculptures by Mexican artist Dionicio Rodriguez.

Elvis Presley was originally buried in Forest Hill Cemetery, the resting place of his backing band's bassist, Bill Black. After an attempted grave robbing, Presley's body was moved and reinterred at the grounds of Graceland.

== Sports ==
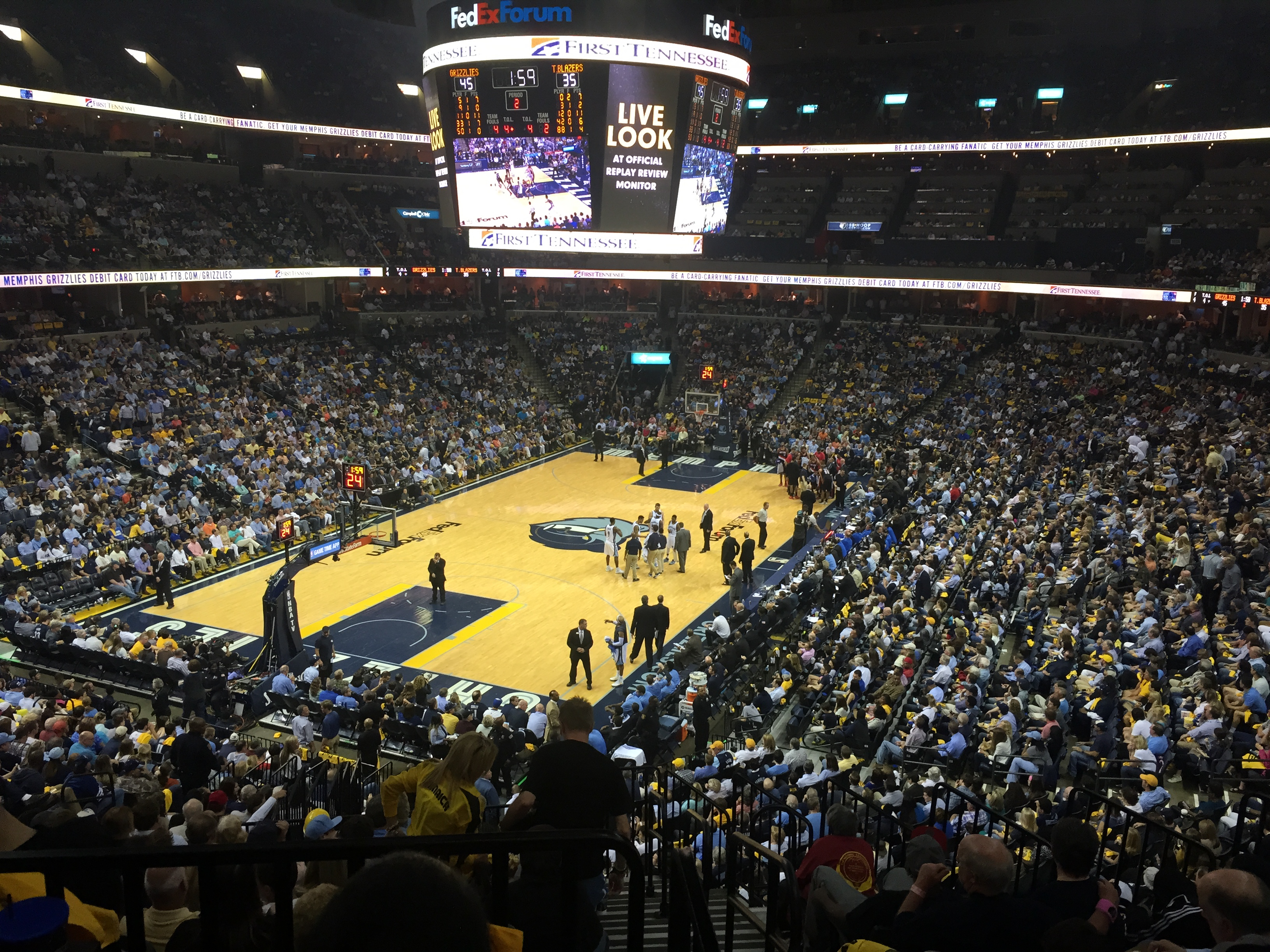
FedExForum during a Grizzlies game

Current professional and major college teams
Sports franchise	League	Sport	Founded	Stadium (capacity)
Memphis Grizzlies	NBA	Basketball	2001	FedExForum (18,100)
Memphis Redbirds	MiLB	Baseball	1998	AutoZone Park (10,000)
Memphis Hustle	NBA G League	Basketball	2017	Landers Center (8,400)
Mid-South Monarchs	FPHL	Ice hockey	2026	Landers Center (8,400)
Memphis Tigers	NCAA D1	Football	1920	Simmons Bank Liberty Stadium (58,318)
Memphis Tigers	NCAA D1	Basketball	1920	FedExForum (18,100)
CBU Buccaneers	NCAA D2	Baseball	1966	Nadicksbernd Field (800)

The Memphis Grizzlies of the National Basketball Association is the only team from one of the "big four" major sports leagues in Memphis. The Memphis Redbirds of the International League are a Minor League Baseball affiliate of the St. Louis Cardinals.

The University of Memphis college basketball team, the Memphis Tigers, has a strong following in the city due to a history of competitive success. The Tigers have competed in three NCAA Final Fours (1973, 1985, 2008), with the latter two appearances being vacated. The current coach of the Memphis Tigers is Penny Hardaway. Memphis is home to Simmons Bank Liberty Stadium, the site of University of Memphis football, the Liberty Bowl and the Southern Heritage Classic.

The annual St. Jude Classic, a regular part of the PGA Tour, is also held in the city. Each February the city hosts the Regions Morgan Keegan Championships and the Cellular South Cup, which are men's ATP World Tour 500 series and WTA events, respectively.

Memphis has a significant history in pro wrestling. Jerry "The King" Lawler and Jimmy "The Mouth of the South" Hart are among the sport's most well-known figures who came out of the city. Sputnik Monroe, a wrestler of the 1950s, like Lawler, promoted racial integration in the city. Ric Flair also noted Memphis as his birthplace.

In the 1970s and early 1980s, the former WFL franchise Memphis Southmen / Memphis Grizzlies sued the NFL in an attempt to be accepted as an expansion franchise. In 1993, the Memphis Hound Dogs was a proposed NFL expansion that was passed over in favor of the Jacksonville Jaguars and Carolina Panthers. The Simmons Bank Liberty Stadium also served as the temporary home of the former Tennessee Oilers (now the Titans) while the city of Nashville worked out stadium issues.

The city is also the site of Memphis International Raceway, which held NASCAR events from 1998 to 2009, when Dover Motorsports closed it. In 2011 it reopened under different ownership. It no longer holds NASCAR races, but the Arca Menards Series returned to the track in 2020.

== Parks and recreation ==
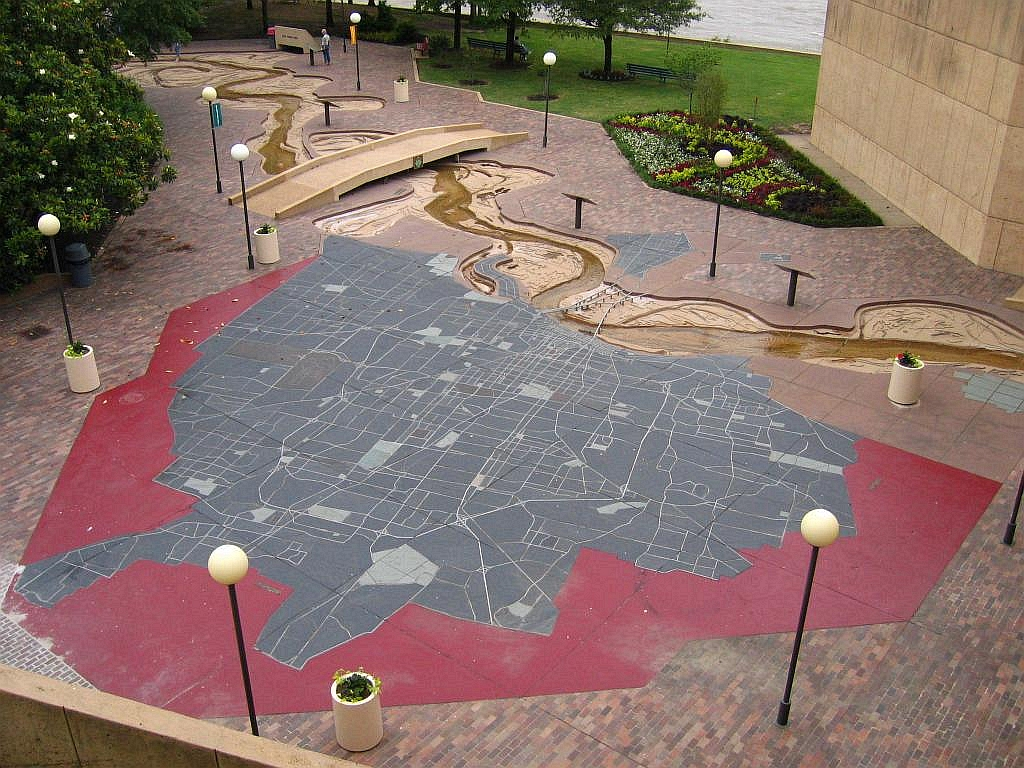
Mud Island River Park

There are more than 160 parks in Memphis spanning 5,600 acres (2,300 ha). Shelby Farms park, located at the eastern edge of the city, is one of the largest urban parks in the United States. Other notable Memphis parks include Tom Lee Park; Overton Park, including the Memphis Zoo and Old Forest Arboretum; T. O. Fuller State Park; the Lichterman Nature Center, a nature learning center; the Memphis Botanic Garden; and Mud Island River Park.

The Wolf River Greenway and Shelby Farms Greenline are two major trails in the Memphis area.

== Government ==
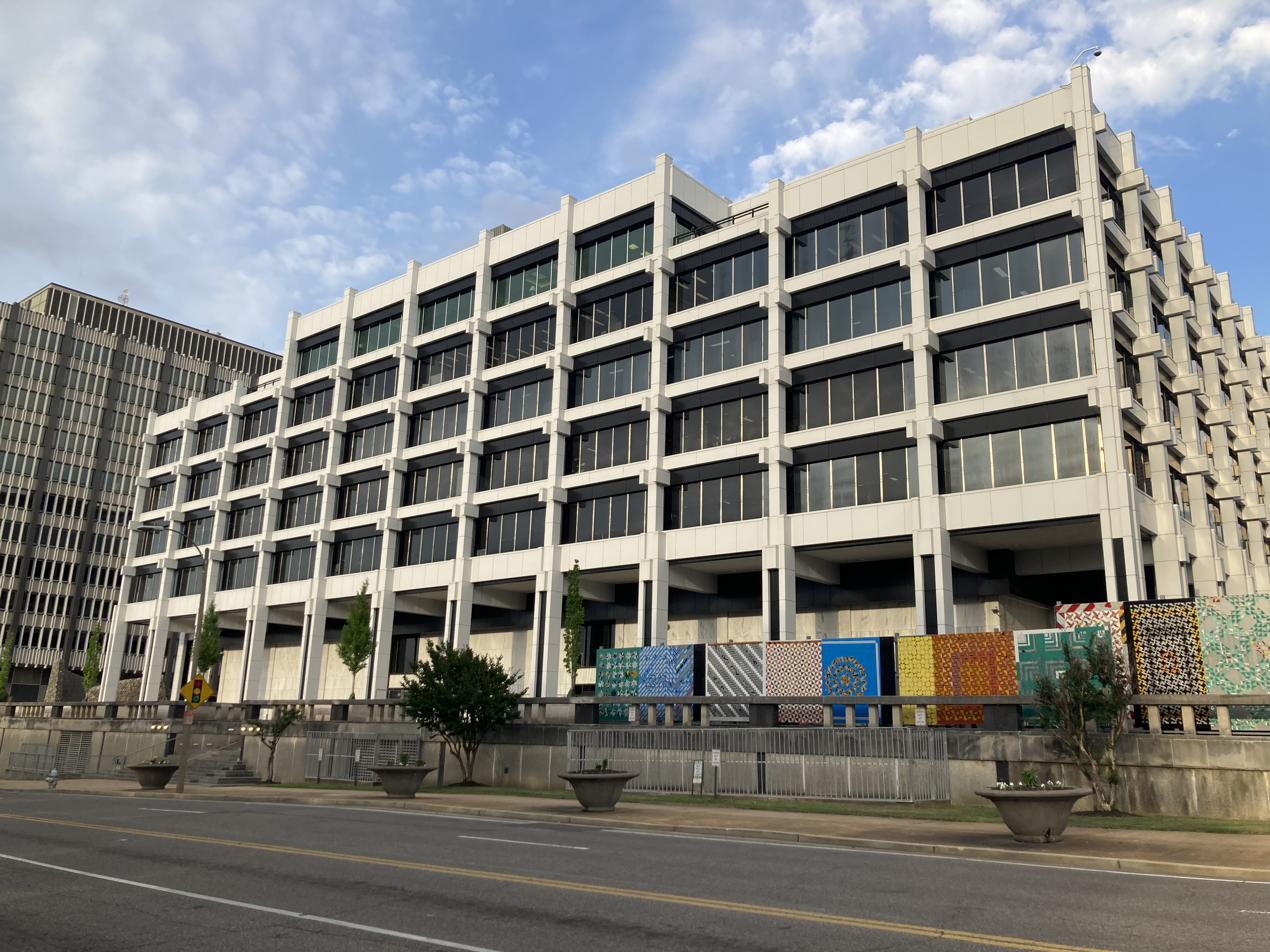
Memphis City Hall in 2025

Beginning in 1963, Memphis adopted a mayor-council form of government, with 13 City Council members, six elected at-large from throughout the city and seven elected from geographic districts. Following passage of the Voting Rights Act of 1965, civil rights activists challenged the at-large electoral system in court because it made it more difficult for the minority to elect candidates of their choice; at-large voting favored candidates who could command a majority across the city. In 1995, the city adopted a new plan. The 13 Council positions are elected from nine geographic districts: seven are single-member districts and two elect three members each. The mayor is elected in a non-partisan election. The current mayor, Paul Young, is a Democrat and took office on January 1, 2024.

Since the late 20th century, regional discussions have recurred on the concept of consolidating unincorporated Shelby County and Memphis into a metropolitan government, as Nashville-Davidson County did in 1963. Consolidation was a referendum item on the 2010 ballots in both the city of Memphis and Shelby County, under the state law for dual-voting on such measures. The referendum was controversial in both jurisdictions. In October 2010 before the vote, eight Shelby County citizens had filed a lawsuit against the dual-voting requirement, arguing that total votes for the referendum should be counted together. City voters narrowly supported the measure for consolidation with 50.8% in favor; county voters overwhelmingly voted against the measure with 85% against. In total voting, 64% of voters opposed the consolidation. In 2014, the federal district court dismissed the lawsuit, on the grounds that the referendum would have failed when both jurisdictions' votes were counted together. The U.S. Sixth District Court of Appeals upheld that decision.

In the United States House of Representatives, Memphis is split between two congressional districts. Most of the city, including downtown, is located in the 9th District, represented by Democrat Steve Cohen. The eastern fourth of the city is in the 8th District, represented by Republican David Kustoff of nearby Germantown.

== Education ==
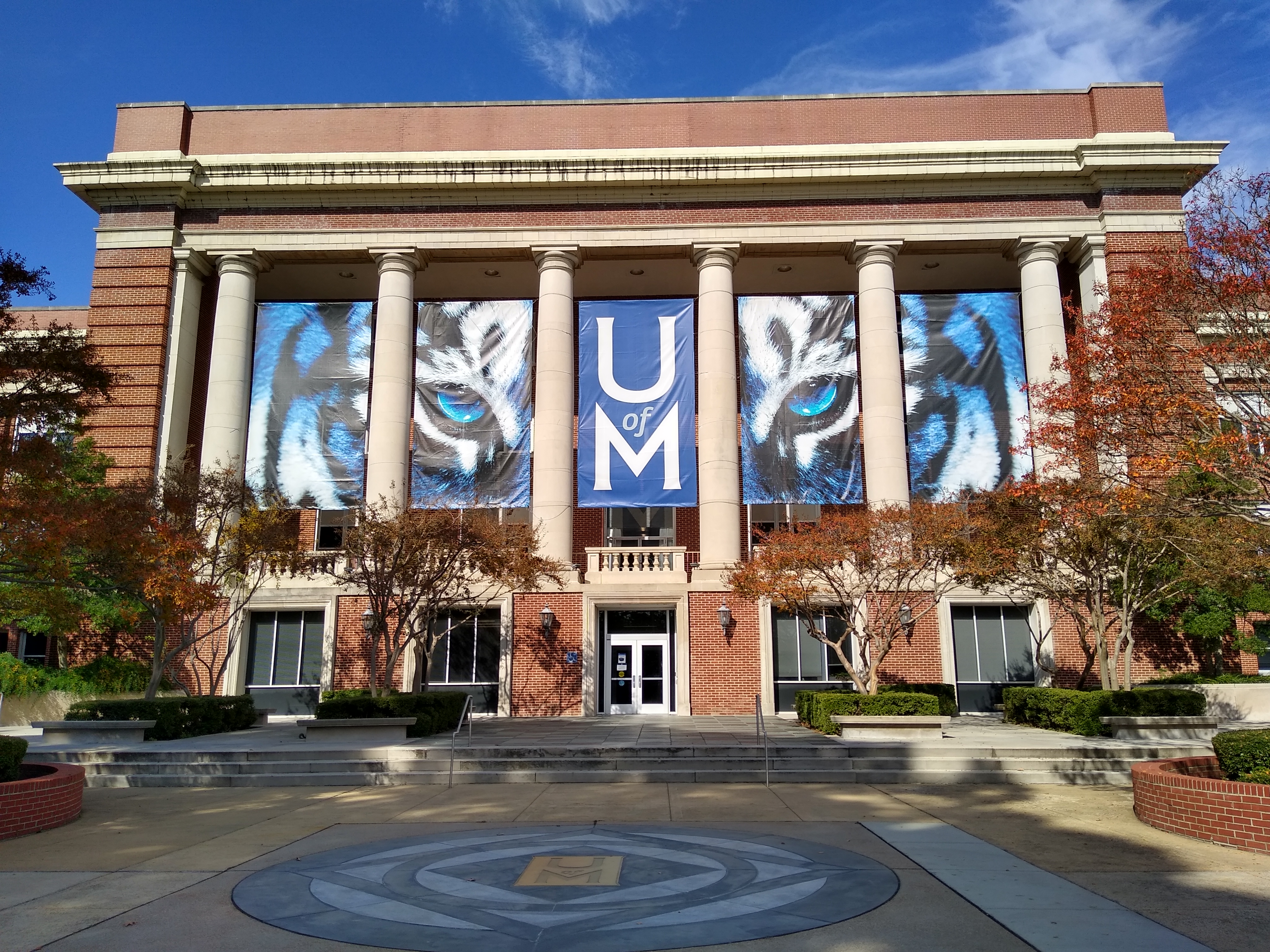
The University of Memphis

=== Primary and secondary ===
The city is served by Memphis-Shelby County Schools (formerly Shelby County Schools). On March 8, 2011, residents voted to dissolve the charter for Memphis City Schools, effectively merging it with the Shelby County School District. After issues with state law and court challenges, the merger took effect the start of the 2013–14 school year. In Shelby County, six incorporated cities voted to establish separate school systems in 2013.

The Memphis-Shelby County School System operates 222 elementary, middle, and high schools.

The Memphis area is also home to many private, college-prep schools, including:

- Briarcrest Christian School (co-ed)
- Christian Brothers High School (boys)
- Evangelical Christian School (co-ed)
- First Assembly Christian School (co-ed)
- St. Mary's Episcopal School (girls)
- Hutchison School (girls)
- Lausanne Collegiate School (co-ed)
- Memphis University School (Note: MUS is a secondary school unaffiliated with the University of Memphis.) (boys)
- Saint Benedict at Auburndale (co-ed)
- St. Agnes Academy (girls)
- Immaculate Conception Cathedral School (girls)
- Elliston Baptist Academy (co-ed)
- Memphis Harding Academy (co-ed)

=== Postsecondary ===
Colleges and universities in the city include:

- University of Memphis
- Rhodes College
- Christian Brothers University
- LeMoyne–Owen College
- Baptist Health Sciences University
- Memphis Theological Seminary
- Harding School of Theology
- Reformed Theological Seminary (satellite campus)
- William R. Moore College of Technology
- Southern College of Optometry
- Southwest Tennessee Community College
- Tennessee Colleges of Applied Technology
- Visible Music College
- Mid-America Baptist Theological Seminary
- University of Tennessee Health Science Center.

Memphis also has campuses of several for-profit post-secondary institutions, including Concorde Career College, ITT Technical Institute, Vatterott College, and University of Phoenix. Remington College is a local nonprofit post-secondary institution.

The University of Tennessee College of Dentistry was founded in 1878, making it the oldest dental college in the South, and the third oldest public college of dentistry in the United States.

== Media ==
=== Newspapers ===
Title	Locale	Year est.	Frequency	Publisher/parent company
The Commercial Appeal	Memphis	1840	Daily	Gannett Company
Memphis Daily News	Memphis	1886	Weekly or bi-weekly	
Memphis Flyer	Memphis	1989	Weekly	Contemporary Media, Inc.
Memphis Tri-State Defender	Memphis	1951	Weekly	Best Media Properties, Inc.

=== Television ===
Nielsen Media Research currently defines Memphis and its surrounding metropolitan area as the 51st largest American media market. Despite Memphis proper's large size, Memphis has always been a medium-sized market; the nearby suburban and rural areas are not much larger than the city itself.

Major broadcast television affiliate stations in the Memphis area include, but are not limited to:

Channel	Call sign	Network	Owner	Subchannels
3	WREG	CBS	Nexstar Media Group	Newschannel 3 Anytime on 3.2, Antenna TV on 3.3
5	WMC	NBC	Gray Media	Bounce TV on 5.2, Action News 5 Plus on 5.3, Oxygen on 5.4, 365BLK on 5.5, Defy on 5.6
10	WKNO	PBS	Mid South Public Communications Foundation	WKNO-2 on 10.2, PBS Kids on 10.3
13	WHBQ	Fox	Rincon Broadcasting Group	Heroes & Icons on 13.2, Ion Mystery on 13.3, Dabl on 13.4
23	WTWV	Independent Religious	Christian Worldview Broadcasting Corporation	
24	WATN	ABC	Tegna Inc.	Quest on 24.2, Cozi TV on 24.3, True Crime on 24.4, Laff on 24.5, The Nest on 24.6, Comet on 24.7, Charge! on 24.8
30	WLMT	The CW/MyNetworkTV	Tegna Inc.	MeTV on 30.2, Start TV on 30.3, Get on 30.4, Shop LC on 30.5, Nosey on 30.6, Confess on 30.7, Rewind TV on 30.8
34	WWTW	TCT	Tri-State Christian Television	
40	WBUY	TBN	Trinity Broadcasting Network	Merit TV on 40.2, TBN Inspire on 40.3, OnTV4U on 40.4, Positiv on 40.5
50	WPXX	Ion Television	Inyo Broadcast Holdings	Court TV on 50.2, Grit on 50.3, Ion Plus on 50.4, Busted on 50.5, Game Show Central on 50.6, HSN on 50.7, QVC on 50.8, QVC2 on 50.9

=== Radio ===
Terrestrial broadcast radio stations in the Memphis area include, but are not limited to:

=== FM stations ===
Call sign	Frequency	City of license	Owner	Slogan	Format
WQOX	88.5 FM	Memphis	Shelby County Schools (grades K–12)	88.5 the Voice of SCS	Urban adult contemporary
WYPL	89.3 FM	Memphis	Memphis Public Library & Information Center	Memphis Public Library Reading Radio	Radio reading service
WEVL	89.9 FM	Memphis	Southern Communication Volunteers, Inc.	Volunteer, Member Supported Radio	Freeform
WKNO	91.1 FM	Memphis	Mid-South Public Communications Foundation	WKNO NPR For the Mid South	Public radio/Classical
WYXR	91.7 FM	Memphis	Crosstown Radio Partnership, Inc.		Freeform
WMFS	92.9 FM	Bartlett	Audacy, Inc.	ESPN Radio	Sports
WMLE	94.1 FM	Germantown	Educational Media Foundation	K-Love	Contemporary Christian
WHAL	95.7 FM	Hornlake, Mississippi	iHeartMedia, Inc.	Hallelujah	Urban gospel
WHRK	97.1 FM	Memphis	iHeartMedia, Inc.	K97.1	Hip-hop
WXMX	98.1 FM	Millington	Cumulus Media	The Max	Rock
WKIM	98.9 FM	Munford	Cumulus Media	The Bridge	Adult contemporary
WLFP	99.7 FM	Memphis	Audacy, Inc.	The Wolf	Country
KJMS	101.1 FM	Olive Branch, Mississippi	iHeartMedia, Inc.	V101	Urban adult contemporary
KWNW	101.9 FM	Crawfordsville, Arkansas	iHeartMedia, Inc.	Kiss-FM	Top 40
WEGR	102.7 FM	Arlington	iHeartMedia, Inc.	Rock 102.7	Classic rock
WRBO	103.5 FM	Como, Mississippi	Cumulus Media	103.5 WBRO	Urban adult contemporary
WRVR	104.5 FM	Memphis	Audacy, Inc.	The River	Adult contemporary
WGKX	105.9 FM	Memphis	Cumulus Media	KIX 106	Country
KXHT	107.1 FM	Marion, Arkansas	Flinn Broadcasting Corporation	Hot	Hip Hop
WHBQ	107.5 FM	Germantown	Flinn Broadcasting Corporation	107.5 WHBQ	Classic Hits

=== AM stations ===
Call sign	Frequency	City of license	Owner	Format
WHBQ	560 AM	Memphis	Flinn Broadcasting Corporation	Sports
WREC	600 AM	Memphis	iHeartMedia	Talk radio
WCRV	640 AM	Memphis	Bott Radio Network	Christian radio
WMFS	680 AM	Memphis	Audacy, Inc.	Sports
KQPN	730 AM	West Memphis, Arkansas	F.W. Robbert Broadcasting	Sports
WMC	790 AM	Memphis	Audacy, Inc.	Sports
WUMY	830 AM	Memphis	GMF-Christian Media I, LLC.	Spanish Christian
KWAM	990 AM	Memphis	Starnes Media Group	Talk
WGSF	1030 AM	Memphis	Flinn Broadcasting Corporation	Regional Mexican
WDIA	1070 AM	Memphis	iHeartMedia	Urban oldies
WGUE	1180 AM	Turrell, Arkansas	Butron Media Corporation	Regional Mexican
WMPS	1210 AM	Bartlett	Flinn Broadcasting Corporation	Adult Standards
WMSO	1240 AM	Southaven, Mississippi	Flinn Broadcasting Corporation	Urban oldies
WLOK	1340 AM	Memphis	WLOK Radio Inc	Urban gospel
WLRM	1380 AM	Millington	F.W. Robbert Broadcasting	Blues
WOWW	1430 AM	Germantown	Flinn Broadcasting Corporation	Classic hits
WBBP	1480 AM	Memphis	Bountiful Blessings	Urban gospel
WMQM	1600 AM	Lakeland	F. W. Robbert Broadcasting	Christian

== Infrastructure ==
=== Transportation ===
==== Highways ====
I-40, I-55, I-22, I-240, I-269, and SR 385 are the main expressways in the Memphis area. I-40 and I-55 cross the Mississippi River into Memphis from the state of Arkansas. Interstate 69 is a proposed interstate that, upon completion, would connect Memphis to Canada and Mexico.

I-40 is a coast-to-coast freeway that connects Memphis to Nashville and on to North Carolina to the east, and Little Rock, Oklahoma City, and the Los Angeles area to the west. I-55 connects Memphis to St. Louis and Chicago to the north, and Jackson and New Orleans to the south. I-240 is the inner beltway which serves areas including Downtown, Midtown, South Memphis, Memphis International Airport, East Memphis, and North Memphis. I-269 is the larger, outer interstate loop immediately serving the suburbs of Millington, Eads, Arlington, Collierville, and Hernando, Mississippi. It was completed in 2018.

I-22 connects Memphis with Birmingham, via northern Mississippi (including Tupelo) and northwestern Alabama. While technically not entering the city of Memphis proper, I-22 ends at I-269 in Byhalia, connecting it to the rest of the Memphis interstate system.

I-69 is proposed to follow I-55 and I-240 through the city of Memphis. Once completed, I-69 will link Memphis with Port Huron via Indianapolis, and Brownsville via Shreveport and Houston, Texas.

Memphis maintains 6,800 lane-miles of local roadways. The city collaborated with Google Cloud Platform and SpringML in February 2019 to test machine learning (ML) to improve public services. A key focus is pothole identification using TensorFlow technology. Public Works personnel completed 63,000 repairs, with around 7,500 of those reported by citizens to 311.

==== Transit ====
The Memphis Area Transit Authority provides local transit services around Memphis, including the MATA Trolley heritage streetcar system. Intercity bus service to the city is provided by Flixbus, Greyhound Lines, and Jefferson Lines.

==== Railroads ====
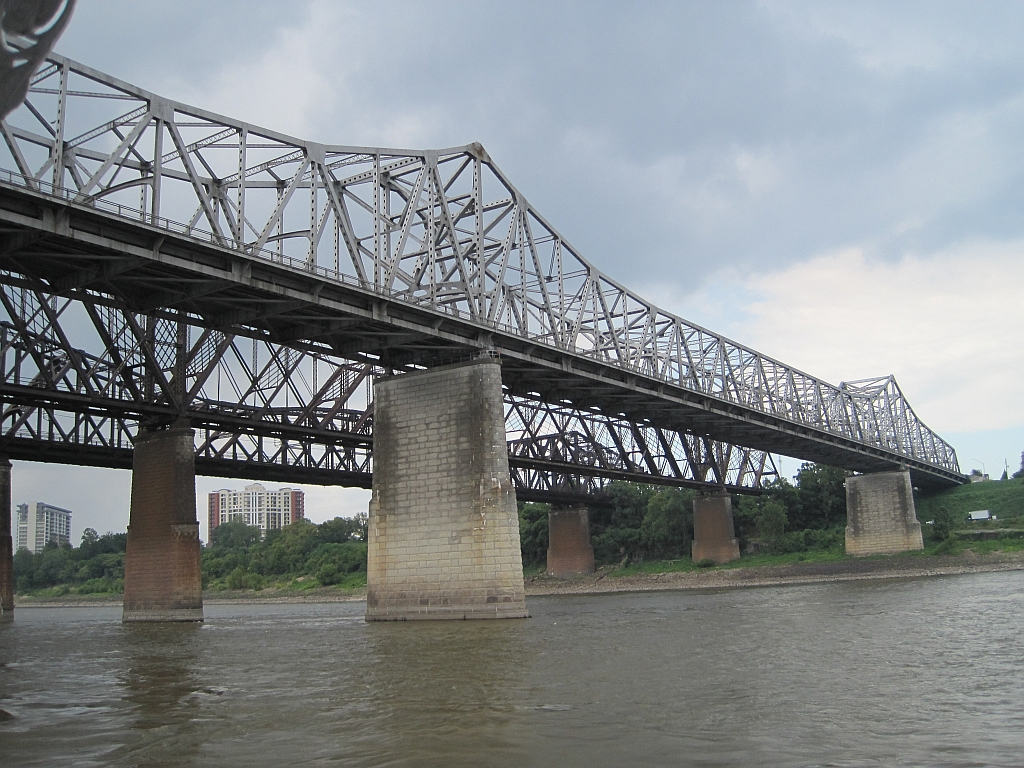
Three bridges over the Mississippi

A large volume of railroad freight moves through Memphis, because of its two Mississippi River railroad crossings, which carry several major east–west railroad freight lines, and also because of the major north–south railroad lines through Memphis which connect with such major cities as Chicago, St. Louis, Indianapolis, Louisville, New Orleans, Dallas, Houston, Mobile, and Birmingham.

By the early 20th century, Memphis had two major passenger railroad stations, which made the city a regional hub for trains coming from the north, east, south and west. After passenger railroad service declined heavily through the middle of the 20th century, the Memphis Union Station was demolished in 1969. The Memphis Central Station was eventually renovated, and it still serves the city. The only inter-city passenger railroad service to Memphis is the daily City of New Orleans train, operated by Amtrak, which has one train northbound and one train southbound each day between Chicago and New Orleans.

===== Railroads, common freight carriers =====
- BNSF Railway (BNSF)
- Canadian National Railway (CN) through subsidiary Illinois Central Railroad (IC)
- CSX Transportation (CSXT)
- Canadian Pacific Kansas City (CPKC)
- Norfolk Southern Railway (NS), including subsidiaries Alabama Great Southern Railroad (AGS), Central of Georgia Railroad (CG), Cincinnati, New Orleans and Texas Pacific Railway (CNTP), Tennessee Railway (TENN), and Tennessee, Alabama and Georgia Railway (TAG)
- R.J. Corman Railroad/Memphis Line (RJCM)
- Union Pacific Railroad (UP)

==== Airports ====
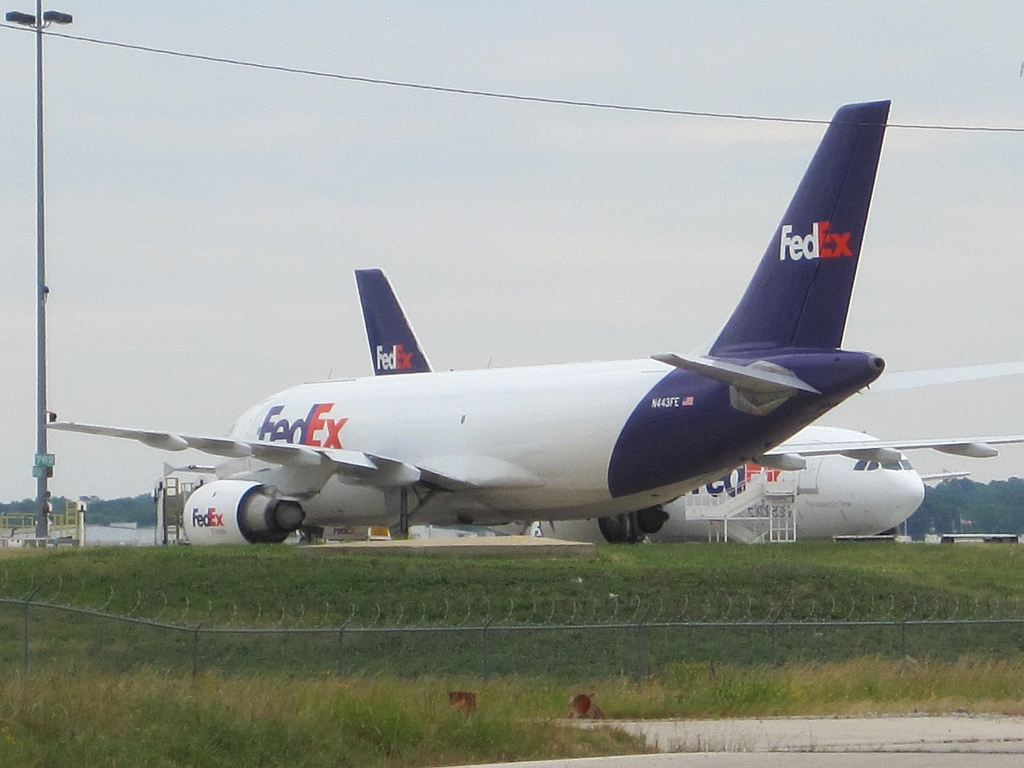
FedEx aircraft at Memphis International Airport

Memphis International Airport is the global "SuperHub" of FedEx Express, and has the largest cargo operations by volume of any airport worldwide, surpassing Hong Kong International Airport in 2021. Memphis International ranks as the 41st busiest passenger airport in the US and served as a hub for Northwest Airlines (later Delta Air Lines) until September 3, 2013. It had 2.42 million boarding passengers (enplanements) in 2025, a 2.9% decrease over the previous year. Delta has reduced its flights at Memphis by approximately 65% since its 2008 merger with Northwest Airlines and operates an average of 30 daily flights as of December 2013, with two international destinations (Cancún – seasonally; Toronto year-round). Delta Air Lines announced the closing of its Memphis pilot and crew base in 2012. Other airlines providing passenger service are: Southwest Airlines; American Airlines; United Airlines; Allegiant; Frontier; Air Canada; and Southern Vacations Express.

There are also general aviation airports in the Memphis Metropolitan Area, including the Millington Regional Jetport, located at the former Naval Air Station in Millington, Tennessee.

==== River port ====
Memphis has the second-busiest cargo port on the Mississippi River, which is also the fourth-busiest inland port in the United States. The Port of Memphis covers both the Tennessee and Arkansas sides of the Mississippi River from river mile 725 (km 1167) to mile 740 (km 1191). A focal point of the river port is the industrial park on President's Island, just south of Downtown Memphis.

==== Bridges ====
Four railroad and highway bridges cross the Mississippi River at Memphis. In order of their opening years, these are the Frisco Bridge (1892, single-track rail), the Harahan Bridge (1916, a road-rail bridge until 1949, currently carries double-track rail), the Memphis-Arkansas Memorial Bridge (Highway, 1949; later incorporated into I-55), and the Hernando de Soto Bridge (I-40, 1973). A bicycle/pedestrian walkway opened along the Harahan Bridge in late 2016, utilizing the former westbound roadway.

=== Utilities ===
Memphis's primary utility provider is the Memphis Light, Gas and Water Division (MLGW). This is the largest three-service municipal utility in the United States, providing electricity, natural gas, and pure water service to all residents of Shelby County. Prior to that, Memphis was served by two primary electric companies, which were merged into the Memphis Power Company.

The City of Memphis bought the private company in 1939 to form MLGW, which was an early customer of electricity from the Tennessee Valley Authority (TVA). In 1954 the Dixon-Yates contract was proposed to make more power available to the city from the TVA, but the contract was cancelled; it had been an issue for the Democrats in the 1954 Congressional elections.

MLGW buys most of its power from TVA, and the company pumps its own fresh water from the Memphis Aquifer, using more than 175 water wells.

=== Health care ===
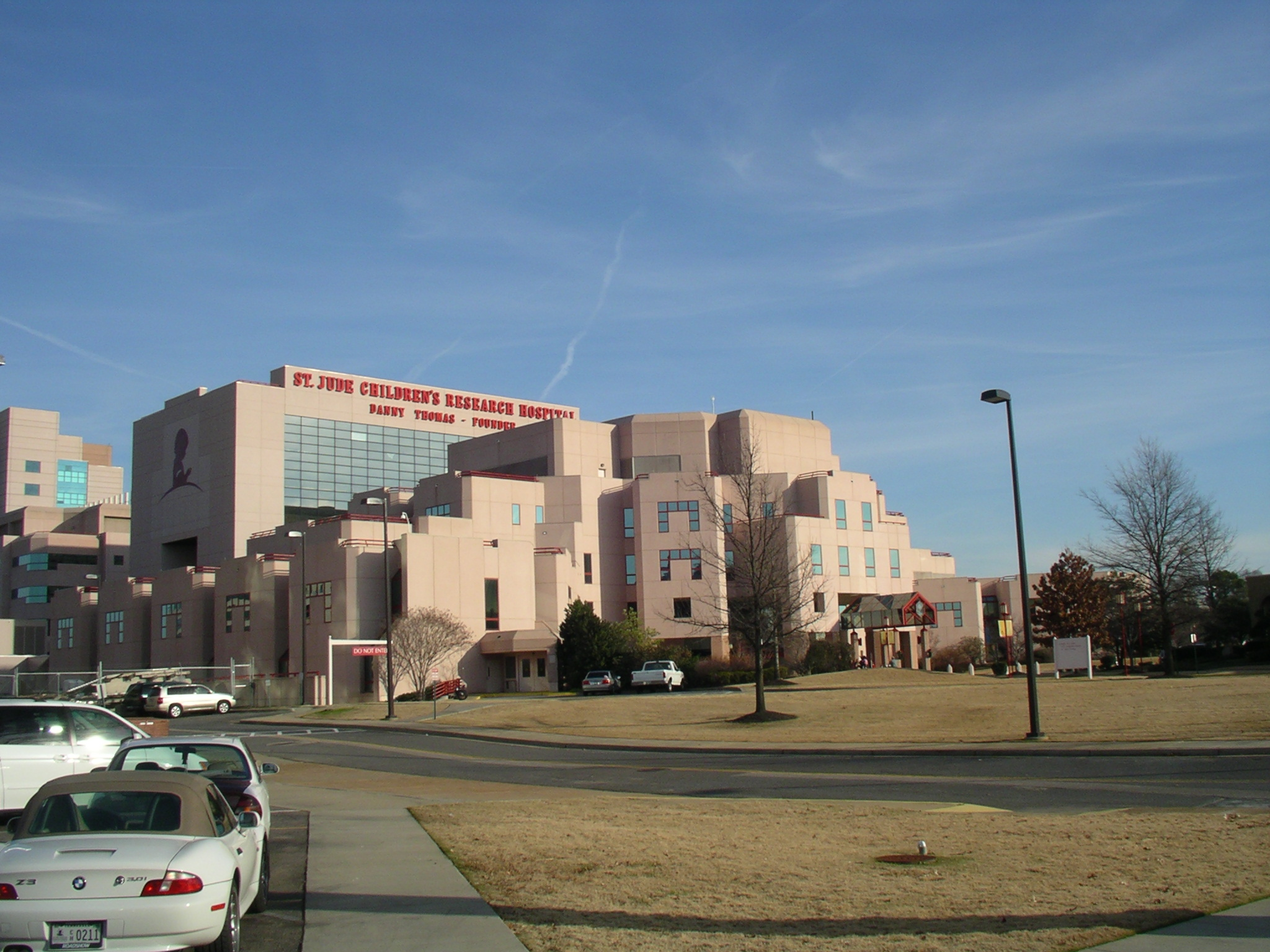
St. Jude Children's Research Hospital

The Memphis and Shelby County region supports numerous hospitals, including the Methodist and Baptist Memorial health systems, two of the nation's largest private hospitals. Until the 1960s and the end of segregation, most hospitals only served white patients. One of the few hospitals for African Americans in Memphis in those times was Collins Chapel Connectional Hospital, whose historic building now houses a homeless shelter.

Methodist Le Bonheur Healthcare, the largest healthcare provider in the Memphis region and the fourth largest employer as of 2018, operates seven hospitals and several rural clinics. Methodist Healthcare operates, among others, the Le Bonheur Children's Hospital, which offers primary level 1 pediatric trauma care, as well as a nationally recognized pediatric brain tumor program. Methodist Healthcare also operates Methodist University Hospital, a 617-bed facility 1 mile southeast of Le Bonheur.

Baptist Memorial Healthcare operates fifteen hospitals (three in Memphis), including Baptist Memorial Hospital, and with a merger in 2018 became the largest healthcare system in the mid-South. According to Health Care Market Guide's annual studies, Mid-Southerners have named Baptist Memorial their "preferred hospital choice for quality".

The St. Jude Children's Research Hospital, leading pediatric treatment and research facility focused on children's catastrophic diseases, resides in Memphis. The institution was conceived and built by entertainer Danny Thomas in 1962 as a tribute to St. Jude Thaddeus, patron saint of impossible, hopeless, and difficult causes.

Regional One Health is located in Memphis.

Memphis is home to Delta Medical Center of Memphis, which is the only employee-owned medical facility in North America. Christ Community Health Services focusses on services to homeless and low-income individuals in the city.

Individual health insurance marketplace insurers are limited, with Bright Health and Cigna offering coverage in the area.

== Twin towns – sister cities ==
Memphis has sister city relationships with:

- (The Gambia) Kanifing, Gambia
- Liverpool, England
- Porretta Terme, Italy

== See also ==
- 1865 Memphis earthquake
- Greater Memphis Chamber
- Memphis Mafia
- Memphis Summer Storm of 2003
- List of tallest buildings in Memphis
- List of U.S. cities with large Black populations
- List of municipalities in Tennessee
- USS Memphis, 6 ships
