= WKIM =

- Munford, Tennessee; United States
- Broadcast area: Memphis metropolitan area
- Frequency: 98.9 MHz
- Branding: News Talk 98.9

Programming
- Format: Talk radio
- Network: Fox News Radio
- Affiliations: Westwood One; Memphis Tigers; Tennessee Titans

Ownership
- Owner: Cumulus Media; (Radio License Holding CBC, LLC)
- Sister stations: WGKX, WRBO, WXMX

History
- First air date: 1948
- Former call signs: KBOA-FM (1948–1973); KTMO (1973–2001); KXMI (2001); WJZN (2001–2004); WMPW (2004–2006)
- Call sign meaning: "Kim FM" (former format)

Technical information
- Licensing authority: FCC
- Facility ID: 33671
- Class: C1
- ERP: 100,000 watts (horizontal); 98,100 watts (vertical)
- HAAT: 187 meters (614 ft)
- Transmitter coordinates: 35.155°N 89.822°W

Links
- Public license information: Public file; LMS
- Webcast: Listen live
- Website: newstalk989.com

WKIM (98.9 FM) is a commercial radio station licensed to Munford, Tennessee, and serving the Memphis metropolitan area. It is owned by Cumulus Media and airs a talk format.

The studios are located on Murray Road at the Memphis Radio Group building in East Memphis. The transmitter site is in Cordova, Tennessee, off Raleigh-Lagrange Road. WKIM has an effective radiated power (ERP) of 100,000 watts, the current maximum for American FM stations.

== Programming ==
Weekdays on WKIM have local shows in morning and afternoon drive time. The Memphis Morning News is hosted by Ditch and Tim, a talk and interview show. The Nation of Jake is heard in late afternoons. The rest of the schedule is nationally syndicated talk programs, including The Brian Kilmeade Show, The Vince Show with Vince Coglianese, Will Cain Country, Fox Across America with Jimmy Failla, America Tonight with McGraw Milhaven, Red Eye Radio and America in the Morning with John Trout. Most hours begin with an update from Fox News Radio.

WKIM carries Tennessee Titans football along with University of Memphis Tigers football, men's basketball, and women's basketball, as well as seasonal talk shows with the Memphis football and men's basketball coaches. Previously, WKIM had the Memphis Showboats of the United Football League before the league folded in 2023.

== History ==
=== Early years (1948–2001) ===
The station signed on the air in 1948. It originally broadcast in Kennett, Missouri, and used the call sign KBOA-FM, the sister station to KBOA 830 AM (now WUMY in Memphis). Because KBOA was a daytimer, KBOA-FM could continue broadcasting the station's programming after sunset for listeners with FM receivers. In the 1970s, the station switched its call letters to KTMO and began airing a country music format.

Kennett is about 90 miles (140 km) north of Memphis. KBOA-FM and KTMO were powered at 6,900 watts, so the station could not be heard in the Memphis area.

=== Smooth jazz (2001–2004) ===
In 2001, the Federal Communications Commission (FCC) gave the station permission to move into the more lucrative Memphis radio market. After its relocation, it began playing smooth jazz as WJZN "Smooth Jazz 98.9". That lasted three years.

=== Rhythmic (2004–2006) ===
In November 2004, the station changed to a rhythmic contemporary format as WMPW, "Power 99", putting it in competition with urban contemporary WHRK, rhythmic KXHT and mainstream top 40 WHBQ-FM.

=== Adult hits (2006–2010) ===
Former logo used from September 15, 2006 through April 3, 2010

On September 15, 2006, at 2 p.m., WMPW flipped to a female-leaning adult hits format as "98-9 Kim FM" under new call letters WKIM. The first song on "Kim FM" was Like a Prayer by Madonna. After several books of substandard ratings, about a year later, the station switched to Hot AC. The format change still did not draw enough listeners.

=== '90s hits (2010–2011) ===
On March 31, 2010, at 5 p.m., the format was flipped to 1990s hits as Gen X 98-9. The first song on "Gen X 98.9" was Losing My Religion by R.E.M. By that autumn, the station added some current hits, making it a 1990s/Hot AC hybrid format.

=== Talk (2011–2015) ===
On April 25, 2011, the station switched to a talk radio format, branded as "News/Talk 98.9". Because the station is owned by Cumulus Media, many of the shows heard on News/Talk 98.9 were from the co-owned Westwood One Network.

=== Classic hip hop (2015–2017) ===
On February 27, 2015, at Noon, WKIM flipped to classic hip-hop, branded as "98.9 The Vibe." The first song on "The Vibe" was "Hip Hop Hooray" by Naughty by Nature. WKIM was one of two stations in the market airing the format; WIVG was the other. (That station has since flipped back to alternative rock).

=== Adult contemporary (2017–2021) ===
On October 31, 2017, at Noon, WKIM began stunting with Christmas music as "Christmas 98.9." On December 26, at 6 a.m., WKIM flipped to adult contemporary as "98.9 The Bridge." The switch puts WKIM in competition with Entercom-owned WRVR, one of Memphis' leading radio stations. From early November until the Christmas holidays, WKIM switched to all-Christmas music. Weekday mornings, WKIM carried the syndicated Bob & Sheri Show from WLNK in Charlotte.

=== Return to Talk (2021–present) ===
On May 25, 2021, Cumulus Media announced an agreement (initially for 5 years, and extended indefinitely before the initial deadline in a further agreement between Cumulus and the university) to carry University of Memphis Tigers athletics on WKIM. The Tigers had previously been heard on iHeartMedia's WREC 600 AM and WEGR 102.7 FM. Concurrently, it was also announced WKIM would flip back to a talk radio format as "News/Talk 98.9, The Roar of Memphis".

WKIM also became the Memphis affiliate for the Tennessee Titans Radio Network. In addition, WKIM affiliated with CBS Radio News for world and national coverage. That later changed to Fox News Radio.
