= WHBQ =

WHBQ may refer to:

- WHBQ (AM), a radio station (560 AM) licensed to Memphis, Tennessee, United States
- WHBQ-FM, a radio station (107.5 FM) licensed to Germantown, Tennessee, United States
- WHBQ-TV, a television station (channel 13 digital) licensed to Memphis, Tennessee, United States
- WGKX, a radio station (105.9 FM) licensed to Memphis, Tennessee, United States, which used the call sign WHBQ-FM until 1973.
