= WMC (AM) =

Radio station in Memphis, Tennessee

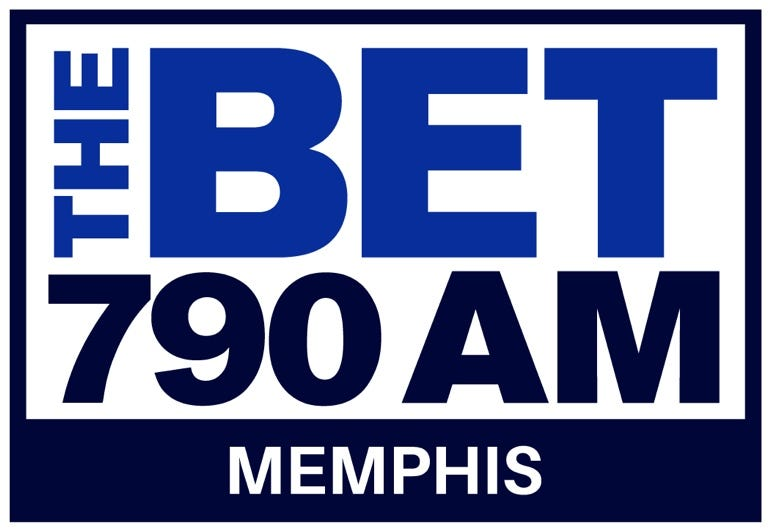
- Memphis, Tennessee; United States
- Broadcast area: Memphis metropolitan area
- Frequency: 790 kHz
- Branding: The Bet Memphis

Programming
- Language: English
- Format: Sports gambling
- Affiliations: BetMGM Network; Westwood One Sports

Ownership
- Owner: Audacy, Inc.; (Audacy License, LLC)
- Sister stations: WLFP; WMFS; WMFS-FM; WRVR

History
- First air date: January 20, 1923
- Call sign meaning: Memphis Commercial Appeal (former sister newspaper)

Technical information
- Licensing authority: FCC
- Facility ID: 19185
- Class: B
- Power: 5,000 watts
- Transmitter coordinates: 35°10′7.3″N 89°53′6.3″W

Links
- Public license information: Public file; LMS
- Webcast: Listen live (via Audacy)

WMC (790 kHz) is a commercial AM radio station in Memphis, Tennessee, broadcasting a sports gambling format. It is one of the city's oldest radio stations, and still uses its original three-letter call sign. WMC maintains studios in the Audacy, Inc. complex in Southeast Memphis, and has its transmitter towers (a four-tower array) in Northeast Memphis.

The station runs direct satellite feeds of BetMGM Network and Westwood One Sports. In addition to sports talk shows, WMC features longtime Memphis disc jockey George Klein's weekly tribute program to Elvis Presley. Klein and Presley were close friends and confidantes during the latter's lifetime and the former's long stint on WHBQ.

The station is owned by Audacy, Inc., which (as Entercom) it purchased from CBS Radio in September 2006. WMC and sister WMC-FM (now WLFP) were for many years owned and operated by Scripps Howard Broadcasting, along with its one-time co-owned TV sister WMC-TV Channel 5, before SHB sold the stations in 1993. WMC is one of five radio properties in the Memphis market held by Audacy; the others are WLFP, WMFS, WMFS-FM and WRVR. WMFS and WMFS-FM, like WMC, are sports stations. All three formerly shared feeds from ESPN Radio (which remains on the WMFS stations), although WMFS and WMFS-FM also have local hosts, while WMC sometimes carries Infinity Sports Network.

== History ==
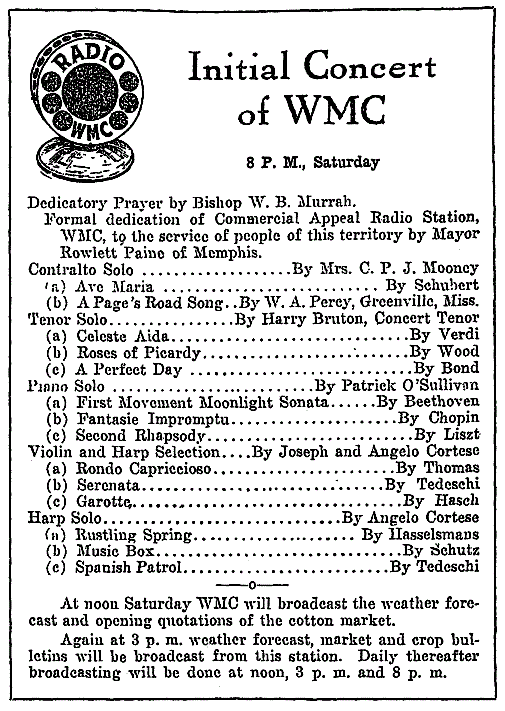
Schedule for WMC's debut broadcast on January 20, 1923

WMC was first licensed in January 1923 to the Memphis Commercial Appeal, and the call letters reflected the M and C from its owner's initials. The station was initially authorized to transmit on both the "Class B" high-power "entertainment" wavelength of 400 meters (750 kHz) as well as the "market and weather forecasts" wavelength of 485 meters (619 kHz).

The newspaper reported that it received WMC's initial authorization via a telegram from the government, and it began test transmissions on the evening of January 17, 1923, in preparation for the station's formal debut on the evening of January 20, 1923. Among the station's unique features were late night concerts from blues singers. Although Memphis was racially segregated, Bessie Smith performed at WMC on October 5, 1923. The station's signal was wide-ranging, and in the summer of 1924 it reported that it had been heard as far south as off the coast of Chile, in addition to having been one of the stations previously heard during an Arctic expedition led by Donald Baxter MacMillan.

In the 1930s, WMC carried the NBC Red Network, while rival WMPS, owned by the Memphis Press-Scimitar, aired the NBC Blue Network. Starting in the 1930s, the station used a riverboat whistle as its sounder, a nod to Memphis' location on the Mississippi River—a practice that continued well into the 1990s.

WMC added an FM sister station, WMCF (later WMC-FM; now WLFP), in 1947 and a TV station, WMCT (now WMC-TV), in 1948. WMC had been an NBC Radio affiliate since 1927, so WMC-TV also affiliated with the NBC TV Network, which it still carries to this day.

During the 1960s, WMC had a middle of the road format of popular adult singers (known in the industry as MOR). In 1973, WMC became the first 24-hour full-time country music station in Memphis and was often #1 in the ratings. By the 1980s, music listening was shifting from AM radio to FM and in 1983, 105.9 WGKX (KIX 106) went country as WMC's first full signal FM country competition. By 1989, WMC switched to news/talk.

After 67 years with NBC Radio, WMC switched to CBS Radio News in 1994.

In 1997, "News/Talk 790" gave up Rush Limbaugh to rival 600 WREC as well as its morning news show.

In July 2001, WMC made the switch to all-sports as "Sportsplus 790". The Good Times Show, with news about casino gambling in Tunica, Mississippi, made its debut on the station at that time.

In December 2005, CBS Radio changed WMC to a classic country format, because the Memphis radio market had many competing sports stations. Most programming was provided by Jones Radio Networks' Classic Hit Country network, which subsequently became Dial Global's Classic Country network. The station returned to an all-sports format on October 17, 2011, taking the Fox Sports Radio affiliation from 730 KQPN.

On May 1, 2014, WMC picked up the ESPN Radio affiliation (rebranding as "ESPN 790") in addition to its CBS Sports Radio affiliation.

On December 9, 2021, WMC rebranded as The Bet, adding sports betting-related programming from Audacy's BetQL Network (now BetMGM Network) alongside CBS Sports Radio.

== See also ==
- List of three-letter broadcast call signs in the United States
