= WOWW =

Adult album alternative radio station in Memphis, Tennessee

- Germantown, Tennessee; United States
- Broadcast area: Memphis metropolitan area
- Frequency: 1430 kHz
- Branding: Radio Pig

Programming
- Language: English
- Format: Adult album alternative

Ownership
- Owner: Flinn Broadcasting Corporation
- Sister stations: KXHT; WGSF; WHBQ; WHBQ-FM; WMPS; WMSO

History
- First air date: October 29, 1955
- Former call signs: WHER (1955–1973); WWEE (1973–1988); WWBA (1988–1989); WEZI (1989); WNWZ (1989–1997)
- Call sign meaning: Derived from "wow"

Technical information
- Licensing authority: FCC
- Facility ID: 21728
- Class: B
- Power: 2,500 watts
- Transmitter coordinates: 35°12′50″N 89°47′46″W
- Translator: 97.7 W249BN (Memphis)

Links
- Public license information: Public file; LMS
- Webcast: Listen live
- Website: radiopig.com

WOWW (1430 kHz) is a commercial AM radio station licensed to Germantown, Tennessee, and serving the Memphis metropolitan area. WOWW carries an adult album alternative format and calls itself "Radio Pig". It is owned and operated by Flinn Broadcasting Corporation. The station's studios and offices are in Southaven, Mississippi.

WOWW is powered at 2,500 watts. At night, to protect other stations on 1430 AM, WOWW uses a directional antenna with a six-tower array. The transmitter is off Orgill Road in Bartlett, Tennessee. Programming is also heard on an FM translator: 220 watt W249BN at 97.7 MHz in Memphis.

== History ==
=== WHER ===
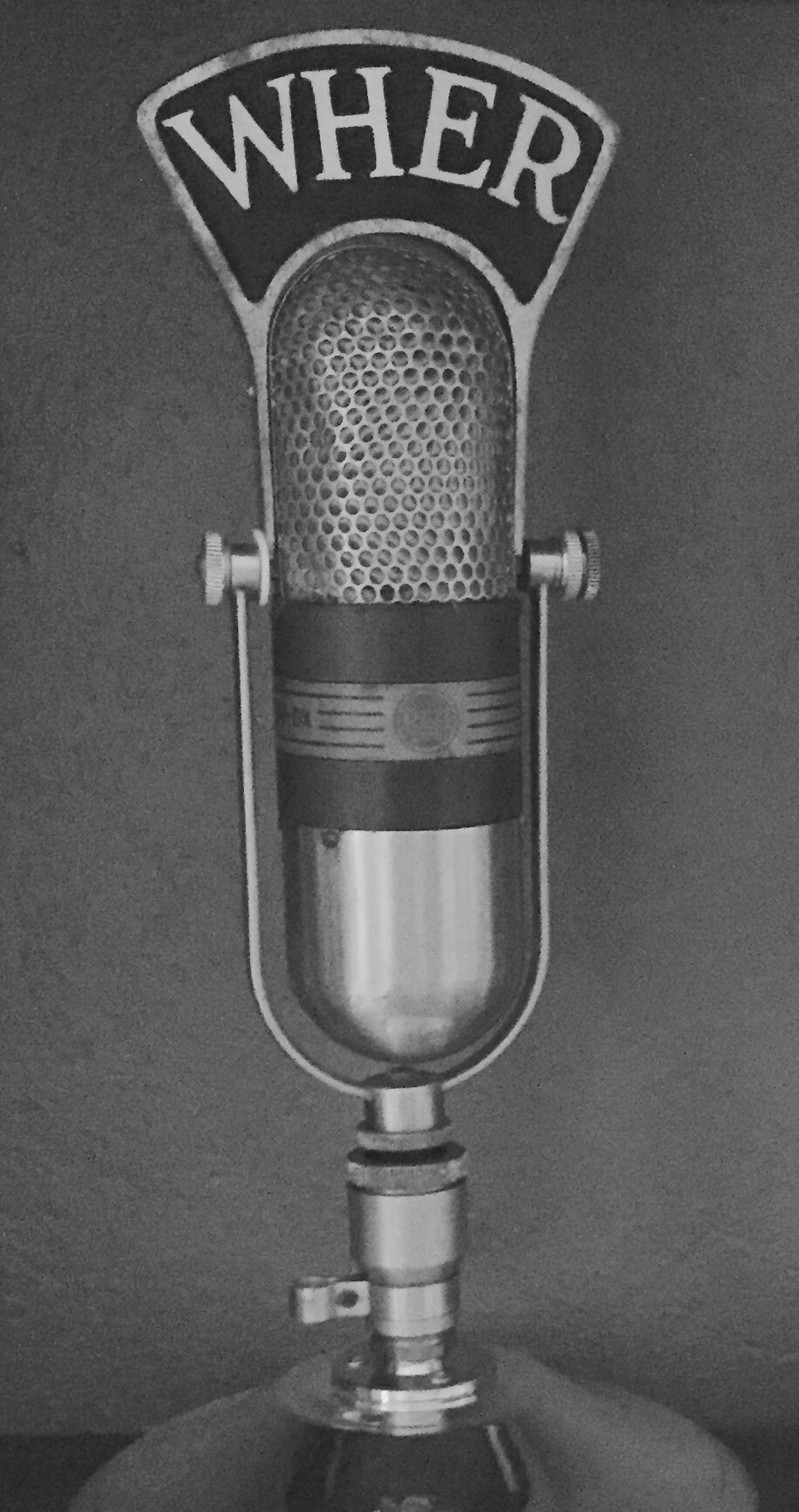
RCA 77 microphone with WHER mic flag.

On October 29, 1955, the station signed on as WHER, a pioneering station with an all-female air staff, including broadcaster Vida Jane Butler. The radio station was the brainchild of Sam Phillips, who used a portion of the $35,000 he made from the sale of Elvis Presley's recording contract to RCA Records to finance the station. A portion of the balance of the funding came from Holiday Inn founder Kemmons Wilson, who also provided the station's first home, in a part of the third Holiday Inn ever built. It aired light music and had the slogan "1,000 Beautiful Watts". The licensee was Tri-State Broadcasting Service, initially owned by Phillips, Clarence A. Camp, and James E. Connolly.

=== WWEE ===
In the early 1970s, WHER went to a mixed-gender air staff and became talk station WWEE. The station gave birth to the longest running sports talk show "SportsLine" (now called "SportsTime"). "SportsLine" went on the air in 1972. Notable former staff members include Marge Thrasher, Bill Thomas, George Lapides, Dick Palmer, Jim Fields, and Jeff Weinberger.

In 1981, the Phillips family bought out the other owners of Tri-State Broadcasting Service, becoming known as the Big River Broadcasting Corporation. Big River liquidated in 1986, selling WWEE to the Ardman Broadcasting Corporation of Tennessee. In 1989, after seven months spent simulcasting co-owned WEZI (now WMLE) with the same call sign, Ardman relaunched the station as WNWZ. Flinn bought the station in 1993, changing the call sign to WOWW in 1997.

== Format flips ==
On February 15, 1997, WOWW flipped from adult standards to Radio AAHS, a children's radio format. Due to Radio AAHS ceasing operations on January 30, 1998, the station switched to a talk radio format. In September 1999, WOWW changed their format to urban gospel, becoming an affiliate of ABC Radio's Rejoice! Musical Soul Food. After later shifting to an oldies and classical music format, WOWW returned to a children's format with Radio Disney with a contemporary hit radio format on April 6, 2000.

On March 12, 2012, WOWW dropped Radio Disney after nearly 12 years in favor of a all-news radio format.

On April 10, 2013, WOWW changed their format to country, simulcasting WEBL 95.3 FM.

On June 21, 2013, WUMY dropped its classic country format for variety hits as "97.7 Guess FM".

On January 2, 2014, WOWW began stunting, directing listeners to WUMY 830 AM Memphis, Tennessee, which took over the "Guess FM" variety hits format.

A few days later, WOWW changed their format to country, branded as "The Rebel", simulcasting WEBL 95.3 FM Coldwater, MS.

On August 6, 2018, WOWW changed their format to classic hits, branded as "97.7 Guess FM".

On May 13, 2022, at noon, WOWW changed their format from classic hits to Top 40/CHR, branded as "B97.7". This returned the station to playing current Top 40 music on this frequency for the first time since Radio Disney in 2012, which also carried a similar format.

On July 4, 2023, WOWW changed their format from Top 40/CHR to adult album alternative, branded as "Radio Pig".

== Translator ==
In addition to the main station, WOWW is relayed by an FM translator to widen its broadcast area. It also provides the listener with high fidelity/stereophonic sound.

Broadcast translator for WOWW
Call sign	Frequency	City of license	FID	ERP (W)	HAAT	Class	FCC info
W249BN	97.7 FM	Memphis, Tennessee	139990	220	223.4 m (733 ft)	D	LMS

== Previous logo ==
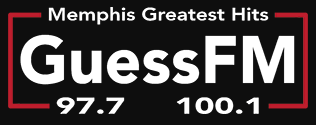
