= WMFS =

WMFS may refer to:

- WMFS (AM), a radio station (680 AM) licensed to Memphis, Tennessee, United States
- WMFS-FM, a radio station (92.9 FM) licensed to Bartlett, Tennessee, United States
- West Midlands Fire Service, a fire and rescue service in England
