= WLFP =

WLFP may refer to:

- WLFP (FM), a radio station (99.7 FM) licensed to serve Memphis, Tennessee, United States
- WMLE, a radio station (94.1 FM) licensed to serve Germantown, Tennessee, which held the call sign WLFP from 2014 to 2023
- WZUM (AM), a radio station (1550 AM) licensed to serve Braddock, Pennsylvania, United States, which held the call sign WLFP from 2007 to 2013
