= WRBO =

Coordinates: 34.862°N 89.878°W

- Germantown, Tennessee; United States
- Broadcast area: Memphis metropolitan area
- Frequency: 103.5 MHz
- Branding: 103.5 WRBO

Programming
- Format: Urban adult contemporary
- Affiliations: Premiere Networks

Ownership
- Owner: Cumulus Media; (Radio License Holding CBC, LLC)
- Sister stations: WGKX, WKIM, WXMX

History
- First air date: 1966 (as WNAU)
- Former call signs: WNAU (1966–1979); WOKM (1979–1982); WOKM-FM (1982–1984); WWKZ (1984–1998)
- Call sign meaning: "R&B Oldies"

Technical information
- Licensing authority: FCC
- Facility ID: 7075
- Class: C1
- ERP: 100,000 watts
- HAAT: 179 meters (587 ft)

Links
- Public license information: Public file; LMS
- Webcast: Listen Live; Listen Live (iHeart)
- Website: 1035wrbo.com

WRBO (103.5 FM) is a radio station licensed to Germantown, Tennessee, and serving the Memphis metropolitan area. Owned by Cumulus Media, WRBO has an urban adult contemporary format playing both current and classic R&B music. The station's studios are located at the Memphis Radio Group building in East Memphis, and the transmitter site is in Olive Branch, Mississippi.

== History ==
From 1966 to 1998, the 103.5 frequency was licensed to New Albany, Mississippi, serving the Tupelo area. The station's call letters were WNAU from 1966 to 1979. In 1979, WNAU's call letters changed to WOKM (later WOKM-FM in 1982). In 1984, the call letters changed to WWKZ, and the station had a Top 40 format branded "KZ-103". WWKZ became among the first FM radio stations with studios in Tupelo when it moved there in 1986.

In 1997, Massachusetts-based Barnstable Broadcasting purchased WWKZ from Radio South in Meridian, Mississippi, and started plans to move the station to the larger Memphis, Tennessee, market. Effective May 1, 1998, WWKZ was re-licensed to Como, Mississippi, serving the Memphis area, with call letters WRBO and broadcasting from a transmitter in nearby Olive Branch, Mississippi. Its R&B format branded "Soul Classics" began in June 1998.

In 2004, Citadel Broadcasting purchased WRBO from Barnstable. Cumulus Media bought Citadel and all its stations in 2011.

In 2011, WRBO began phasing in adult R&B currents while continuing to play classic R&B.

The station currently airs the syndicated Steve Harvey Morning Show and The D.L. Hughley Show. Its main competitor is KJMS, whose Urban AC direction reflects more currents. Because of this shift to Urban AC, Mediabase added WRBO to its Urban AC reporting panel in March 2012.

WRBO was the radio flagship station for Memphis Grizzlies (National Basketball Association) games until the 2010–11 season, after which Entercom-owned WMFS AM and FM picked up the Grizzlies' broadcast rights.

Logo under former slogan
