= WHAL-FM =

- Horn Lake, Mississippi; United States
- Broadcast area: Memphis, Tennessee
- Frequency: 95.7 MHz (HD Radio)
- Branding: Hallelujah 95.7

Programming
- Format: Urban gospel

Ownership
- Owner: iHeartMedia, Inc.; (iHM Licenses, LLC)
- Sister stations: KJMS, KWNW, WDIA, WEGR, WHRK, WREC

History
- First air date: 1991; 35 years ago
- Former call signs: WYYA (1991–1994); WRXQ (1994–1999); WOTO (1999–2002); WHAL (2002–2003)
- Call sign meaning: W HALellujah

Technical information
- Licensing authority: FCC
- Facility ID: 58399
- Class: A
- ERP: 6,000 watts
- HAAT: 88 meters (289 ft)
- Transmitter coordinates: 35°08′9.3″N 89°58′17.3″W

Links
- Public license information: Public file; LMS
- Webcast: Listen Live
- Website: hallelujahfm.iheart.com

WHAL-FM (95.7 MHz) is a radio station in Memphis, Tennessee broadcasting an urban gospel format. The iHeartMedia, Inc. outlet is licensed to nearby Horn Lake, Mississippi. The station's studios are located in Southeast Memphis, and the transmitter site is in the city's Midtown district.

WHAL-FM broadcasts in HD.

== History ==
Prior to the switch to urban gospel, it has most recently carried an oldies format as "Oldies 95.7", WOTO, until 2003. From December 1993 until April 1, 1999, 95.7 ran an alternative rock format as "96X", WRXQ. The Alternative format was later revived at WMFS in 2000 as "93X", and then again at WIVG in 2012, which also brought back WRXQ's "Never Blend In" chameleon logo.
