= Bob Neal (promoter) =

- Born: Robert Neal Hobgood; October 6, 1917; Belgian Congo
- Died: May 9, 1983 (aged 65); Nashville, Tennessee

Bob Neal (born Robert Neal Hobgood; October 6, 1917 – May 9, 1983) was a country music promoter who managed Elvis Presley, Johnny Cash, Sonny James, and Tom T. Hall, among others.

== Biography ==
Neal was born in the Belgian Congo to American missionary parents.

In 1942, he joined WMPS, a Memphis radio station. Although he did not originally play country music, he achieved greater success once he specialized in that style in the early 1950s.

In 1954, Sam Phillips gave Bob Neal an acetate of Elvis Presley's first record and Bob Neal promoted it on WMPS along with Dewey Phillips' promotion of Elvis's first record on WHBQ.

Bob Neal organized live music events and was also an emcee. So, upon Sam Phillips' request, he set up Elvis Presley for his first live performance at Overton Park in Memphis, Tennessee on July 30, 1954.

=== Managing Elvis Presley ===
Neal officially became Elvis Presley's second manager on January 1, 1955, preceded by the band's guitarist Scotty Moore.

In February 1955, Neal started Elvis Presley Enterprises (EPE, Inc.) to promote the product “Elvis Presley”, with an office at 160 Union Avenue, across from the famous Peabody Hotel, in Memphis, Tennessee.

On March 15, 1955, Neal signed an amended one-year contract agreement with Elvis, giving him a 15 percent commission.

On November 21, 1955, Elvis’ contract with Sun was purchased by RCA. At that time, Colonel Tom Parker and Bob Neal agreed to split their combined 40 percent commission on Elvis's earnings.

Moreover, Neal was growing weary of life on the road, he still had his job as a DJ and, by March 1956, he had opened a record store in Memphis.

So, when his contract with Elvis expired on March 15, 1956, he decided not to pursue renewal and Colonel Tom Parker became Elvis’ manager.

Neal would later say "I always felt that Elvis was going to be a big artist, but I never would have believed how big, so I just preferred to drop out of the scene."

=== Later career ===
A few months later, Neal opened a talent agency called Stars, Inc. for representation and booking of artists that would include Johnny Cash, Carl Perkins, Roy Orbison, Sonny James, Warren Smith, Jerry Lee Lewis, etc.

In 1958 he freed the others from their contracts and focused solely on Johnny Cash, moving his family along with Johnny's to California.

The following year he arranged a tour out of the country to Australia for Johnny, something the Colonel should have done, but would never do for Elvis.

However, the Hollywood scene was not as entirely fruitful for them as it was for Elvis and, late in 1960, when their contract expired, they did not renew. They split amicably, with a generous settlement on royalties.

Neal returned to Tennessee and set up in Nashville. Through the 1960s he was back in the talent agencies.

In 1964, Neal started Country Music News Service, a company that offered taped reports and weekly interviews with top country performers to subscribing radio stations, featuring news items about the country music field and interviews with top country music performers.

By the 1970s he would also serve as a director of the Country Music Association.

Never critical, he would later praise what the Colonel did with Elvis, though suggest that he himself would probably not have kept him away from performing for a live audience for so long, something that Elvis always enjoyed.

The same year that Elvis died, in 1977, Neal received the Man of The Year Award from the Nashville Association of Talent Directors for his great contribution in the field of country music.

Neal died on May 9, 1983, at the Park View Hospital in Nashville.

The following year, on October 12, 1984, Bob Neal was elected into the Country Music Disc Jockey Hall Of Fame.
