= KJBR =

KJBR may refer to:

- The ICAO code for Jonesboro Municipal Airport
- KJBR (FM), a radio station (93.7 FM) licensed to Marked Tree, Arkansas, United States
- KWNW, a radio station (101.9 FM) licensed to Crawfordsville, Arkansas (previously in Jonesboro, Arkansas) which held the call sign KJBR from 1982 until 1994
