= WHBQ-FM =

Contemporary hit radio station in Memphis, Tennessee

Coordinates: 35.175°N 89.741°W

- Germantown, Tennessee; United States
- Broadcast area: Greater Memphis
- Frequency: 107.5 MHz
- Branding: 107.5 The Memphis Sports Hub

Programming
- Format: Sports
- Subchannels: HD2: Classic hip-hop "Bumpin 96.3"

Ownership
- Owner: Flinn Broadcasting Corporation
- Sister stations: KXHT; WHBQ; WMPS; WMSO; WOWW

History
- First air date: June 1993
- Former call signs: WAQK (1993–1994); WJOI (1994–1997); WKSL (1997–2001); WYYL (2001); WMPS (2001–2004)
- Call sign meaning: Taken from WHBQ

Technical information
- Licensing authority: FCC
- Facility ID: 50330
- Class: A
- ERP: 3,900 watts
- HAAT: 124 meters (407 ft)
- Translator: HD2: 96.3 W242CF (Memphis)

Links
- Public license information: Public file; LMS
- Webcast: Listen live; HD2: Listen live
- Website: memphissportshub.com; bumpin963.com (HD2)

WHBQ-FM (107.5 FM, "The Memphis Sports Hub") is a commercial radio station licensed to Germantown, Tennessee, United States, and serving Greater Memphis. Owned by Flinn Broadcasting, it carries a sports radio format, with studios on Mount Moriah Road in Southeast Memphis.

WHBQ-FM's transmitter is sited on Lenow Road in Cordova, Tennessee. WHBQ-FM broadcasts in HD Radio: the HD-2 digital subchannel carries a classic hip hop format, relayed over low-power FM translator W242CF at 96.3 MHz in Memphis.

== History ==
=== Early years (1993–2004) ===
The station first signed on the air in June 1993. Its original call sign was WAQK. A year later, the call sign changed to WJOI.

In 1997, Flinn Broadcasting acquired the station for $4.5 million. It took its first jab at the Top 40 format with another call sign change to WKSL, and the moniker "107.5 KISS FM". This station, like the "Q", had a format based on KIIS-FM in Los Angeles, one of the nation's leaders in contemporary hit radio.

This format was ended in 2001, and in August of that year, the call sign was changed to WYYL, a.k.a. "Wild 107.5". This station had a rhythmic contemporary hits format, similar to that of another former Memphis station, Power 99. This format only lasted for four months before being turned into WMPS, a.k.a. "107 Oink Five, The Pig". The station aired an adult album alternative format. The format would move to 96.1 FM in 2004.

=== Top 40 (2004–2020) ===
In June 2004, after three years of Memphis not having a true contemporary hits outlet, the station returned to Top 40 using the name "Q 107-5" and the WHBQ-FM call sign. In 2010, the station expanded its signal by adding a simulcast on 96.1 FM, while 96.1 FM's format of AAA "The Pig" moved to WPGF-LP 87.7 FM.

On April 11, 2013, WIVG split from its simulcast with WHBQ-FM and began stunting with a loop of "Blister in the Sun" by Violet Femmes, and changed format to alternative rock at 4 pm, branded as "96X".

=== Classic hits (2020–2023) ===
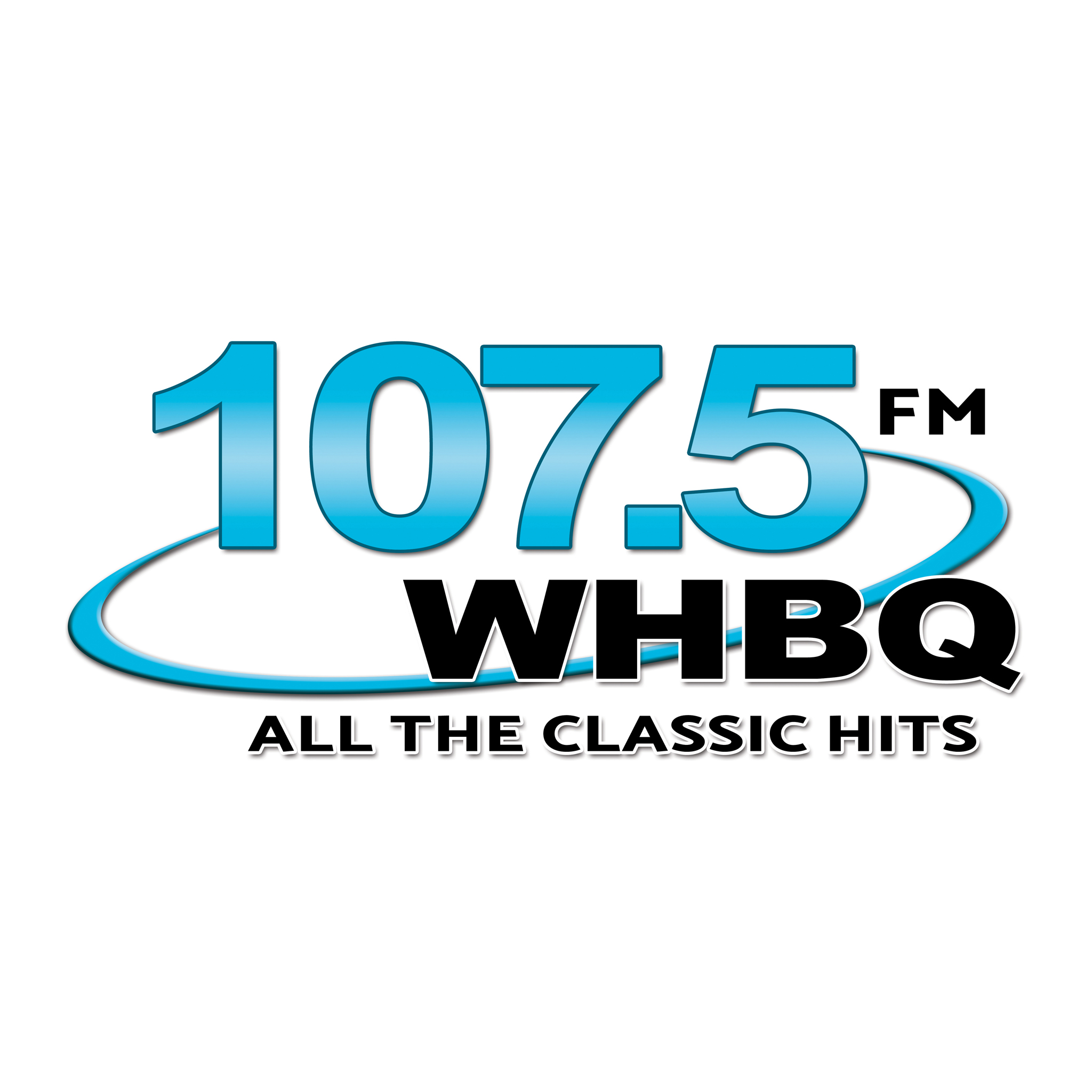
Logo under classic hits format, 2020-2023

On September 28, 2020, at 9:54 a.m., after playing "If the World Was Ending" by JP Saxe featuring Julia Michaels, WHBQ-FM began stunting with Christmas music. At 12:04 pm, the station changed its format from top 40/CHR to classic hits branded as "107.5 WHBQ". The first song that played on WHBQ-FM was "Always Something There To Remind Me" by Naked Eyes. The station aired the syndicated Rick Dees show "Daily Dees" in mornings.

=== "Q" Redux (2023–2026) ===
On April 27, 2023, at Noon, the station shifted back to a Top 40 - CHR format, reverting to the "Q107.5" branding, leaving the Memphis market without a classic hits station. The move came to capitalize on the impending drop of the hot adult contemporary format on WMC-FM. That station would assume the format of WLFP following that station's sale to Educational Media Foundation for its K-Love Contemporary Christian sound.

WHBQ-FM's local airstaff was retained, but Rick Dees' syndicated morning show was dropped. Six days later, WHBQ-FM got competition, as KWNW moved to 102.7 and shifted to Hot AC. It now calls itself "Kiss-FM", a moniker once used by 107.5 FM.

=== Sports 56 simulcast ===
On September 8, 2026, WHBQ-FM changed its format from top 40/CHR to a simulcast of sports-formatted WHBQ 560 AM. The CHR format was subsequently moved to an online-only stream on the company's Hub 901 mobile app which was rebranded as "The Q".

=== Memphis Sports Hub ===
On November 2, 2026, WHBQ-FM rebranded as "107.5 The Memphis Sports Hub" as a result of WHBQ 560 AM changing its format to classic hits.

== HD Radio ==
On August 30, 2019, after stunting with a loop of "Wanna Be Startin' Somethin'" by Michael Jackson, WHBQ-FM launched a 1980s hits format on its HD2 subchannel. It was branded as "Z96.3" and was simulcast on translator W242CF (96.3 FM), which was flipped from its alternative format as "I96".

On January 20, 2020, WHBQ-FM-HD2 and W242CF flipped back to alternative rock, reverting the "I96" branding. 367 days later, on January 22, 2021, at 3 p.m., WHBQ-FM HD2 and W242CF switched to Top 40/CHR, branded as "B96.3", with the first song being "Holy" by Justin Bieber featuring Chance the Rapper.

On May 13, 2022, at noon, WHBQ-FM HD2 switched translators from W242CF to W249BN (97.7 FM), which replaced a classic hits format branded as "Guess-FM". WHBQ-FM's HD2 subchannel and translator at 96.3 now carry a classic hip hop format, known as "Bumpin' 96.3".
