= Quem =

Quem may refer to:

- Quem people, a historic ethnic group of Texas and Mexico
- Quem language, their language
- Quem (magazine), a Brazilian magazine published by Editora Globo

== See also ==
- KWEM (disambiguation)
