= KWAM =

Talk radio station in Memphis, Tennessee, United States

- Memphis, Tennessee; United States
- Broadcast area: Memphis metropolitan area
- Frequency: 990 kHz
- Branding: The Mighty 990

Programming
- Format: Talk radio
- Affiliations: Mississippi State Bulldogs: Compass Media Networks; Premiere Networks; Red Apple Media; Salem Radio Network; Townhall News

Ownership
- Owner: Todd Starnes; (Starnes Media Group, LLC)

History
- First air date: February 9, 1947
- Former call signs: KWEM (1947–1959)
- Call sign meaning: Rhymes with "wham"

Technical information
- Licensing authority: FCC
- Facility ID: 35873
- Class: B
- Power: 10,000 watts (day); 450 watts (night)
- Transmitter coordinates: 35°8′4.00″N 90°5′38.00″W
- Translator: 107.9 W300DE (Memphis)

Links
- Public license information: Public file; LMS
- Webcast: Listen live
- Website: mighty990.com

KWAM (990 AM) is a commercial radio station in Memphis, Tennessee, featuring a conservative talk radio format known as "The Mighty 990". Owned by Todd Starnes via Starnes Media Group, LLC, the station serves the Memphis metropolitan area, including parts of Tennessee, Arkansas and Mississippi. The station that today is KWAM helped "break" early R&B and rock and roll artists such as Elvis Presley, B.B. King, Johnny Cash, Ike Turner and Howlin' Wolf in the late 1940s and 1950s.

KWAM's transmitter is located on Bridgeport Road near Interstate 55 in West Memphis, Arkansas. Programming is also heard in Memphis and adjacent communities on low-power translator W300DE (107.9 FM) and is available online.

== History ==
=== Early years ===
The owners of Little Rock-area radio station KXLR sought to build a statewide network of stations to carry Arkansas Razorbacks football. They felt that the Memphis area would provide important coverage and exposure for the football program. On May 24, 1946, the West Memphis Broadcasting Company obtained a construction permit to build a new daytime-only station on 990 kHz in West Memphis, Arkansas.

After delays, KWEM began operating on February 9, 1947. Its studios were in the Merchants and Planters Bank Building in West Memphis. The official opening was two weeks later on February 23.

=== Popular artists ===
West Memphis was described as the "Las Vegas of the South" in this era, with KWEM programming drawing from musicians playing in local clubs. Howlin' Wolf had a show on the station from 1949 to 1952. Record producer Sam Phillips heard him and signed him to a contract with Sun Records. Howlin' Wolf's program aired after music by rockabilly guitarist Paul Burlison. B.B. King was first heard over the station, getting his break on a show helmed by Sonny Boy Williamson II. Stax Records founder Jim Stewart started at KWEM, as did James Cotton and Hubert Sumlin. Johnny Cash's first radio broadcast was on KWEM in 1953. The station allowed aspiring performers to pay for 15-minute blocks of air time.

Elvis Presley made his first radio appearance on KWEM in 1953, which did not go well because he lacked a band and moved around too much. George Klein worked there as a DJ after his move to Memphis. Eddie Bond also performed on the station in that era.

KWEM was purchased by Dee Rivers in 1951. In March 1952, Rivers applied to have the station moved across the Mississippi River into Memphis. That was approved in January 1954. The transmitter site remained in Arkansas. He started the "Dee" Rivers Stations Group, which later owned WEAS-FM in Springfield/Savannah, Georgia, and WGOV (now WGUN) in Valdosta, Georgia, as well as other stations in Georgia and Florida. KWEM held a construction permit to build TV station channel 48 in Memphis, KWEM-TV. But that plan was abandoned it in August 1953 because Rivers could not find an adequate site that could house both AM and TV studios and the TV station's transmitter site. He did not want this situation to hinder improvements to the radio station. KWEM Radio continued to be an influential hotbed of talent. This lasted through the end of the decade, when KWEM became KWAM.

=== Power boost ===
On March 31, 1959, Rivers changed the call letters to KWAM as part of a presentation overhaul but did not initially change the station's format. The next year, KWAM stopped playing live music. In 1963, the station got FCC permission to boost its power to 10,000 watts, using a directional antenna, but it still could not broadcast after sunset. The transmitter, however, failed and was destroyed in a fire the next year. Memphis radio station 1340 WLOK loaned equipment to help KWAM return to the air.

The KWEM call letters were later revived for 93.3 KWEM-LP, a low-power FM station in West Memphis owned by Arkansas State University Mid-South. The FM station plays blues and Southern gospel music, serving as a tribute to the KWEM of the late 1940s and 1950s. It began broadcasting on FM in 2015 after an earlier version had been established in 2009. The project was led by Dale Franklin, who died in 2017.

=== Gospel and religion ===
In 1968, KWAM began airing Christian talk and teaching shows. It also sold blocks of time to preachers and played black gospel music. The station already had a history of religious radio programming. In 1952, a Doctor of Divinity, William Riley, hosted a religious music program on KWEM. In 1981, Dee Rivers Stations acquired FM station KLYX, which was renamed KWAM-FM. At first, it also aired a gospel and religious format like its AM counterpart. In 1983, the call letters were changed to KRNB, with the station switching to a rhythmic contemporary and disco format, while KWAM continued its gospel sound.

In 1986, KWAM was granted nighttime authorization by the Federal Communications Commission. It was allowed to stay on the air after sunset, but at only 450 watts.

=== Changes in ownership ===
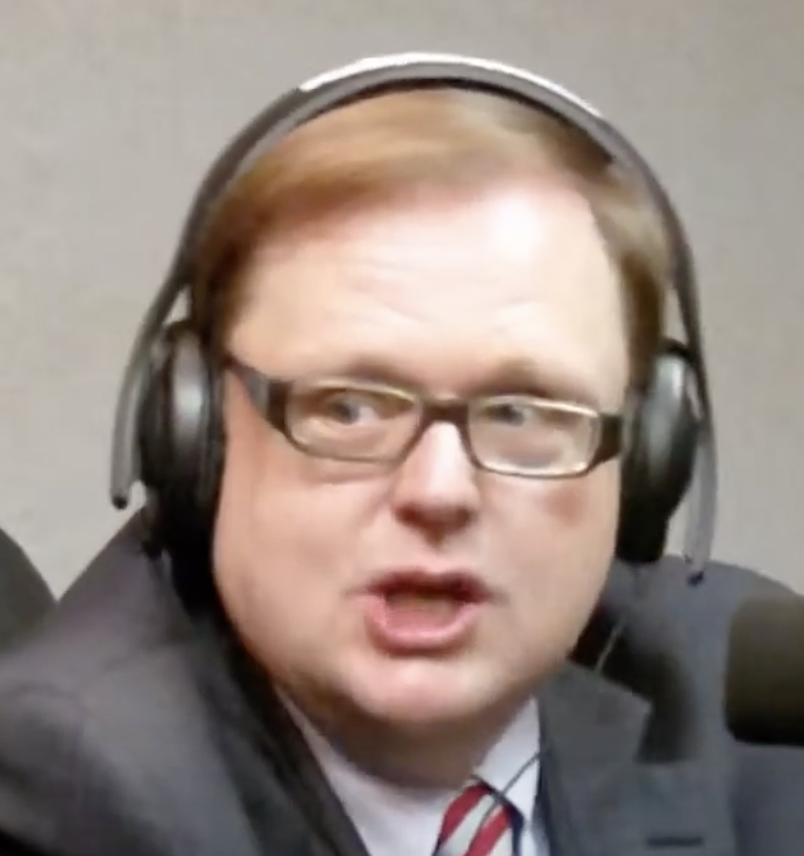
Memphis native Todd Starnes has owned KWAM since March 2020.

In February 1996, U.S. Radio announced it would purchase KWAM and co-owned FM station KJMS from Rivers. This united the two stations with their principal competitors, WDIA (1070 AM) and WHRK (97.1 FM). One month later, U.S. Radio was purchased by Clear Channel Communications for $140 million.

Clear Channel sold KWAM to Concord Media for $1 million in 2000. Concord switched KWAM to a talk radio format competing directly against WREC, which Clear Channel retained. (Clear Channel was renamed iHeartMedia in 2014.) Several years later, KWAM changed hands again, this time bought by Legacy Media, which also owned WEKS, an FM country music station in Zebulon, Georgia, near Atlanta. In 2017, Legacy Media added a 250-watt FM translator for KWAM, W300DE (107.9 FM). Adding the translator allows KWAM listeners in Memphis and adjacent communities to tune in the station on the FM dial. The next year, Legacy changed the station's branding to "KWAM The Voice - Talk Radio for the Midsouth."

Legacy Media sold KWAM as well as its translator for $685,000 to the Starnes Media Group, LLC, owned by Memphis native Todd Starnes. A conservative American columnist, commentator, author and radio host, Starnes previously worked for the Baptist Press, Fox News Channel and Fox News Radio, having departed the latter in October 2019. Upon the close of the purchase on March 31, 2020, Starnes Media Group changed the station's branding to reflect the history of the station, renaming it "The Mighty 990."

== FM translator ==
KWAM's broadcast reach is extended via the following low-power FM translator:

Broadcast translator for KWAM
Call sign	Frequency	City of license	FID	ERP (W)	HAAT	Class	Transmitter coordinates	FCC info
W300DE	107.9 FM	Memphis, Tennessee	148438	250	96.82 m (318 ft)	D	35°8′45.3″N 89°48′48.3″W	LMS
