= Memphis Grizzlies Radio Network =

Sports radio network in the United States

- Type: Radio network
- Country: United States
- First air date: 2001
- Availability: Various AM and FM radio stations
- Headquarters: Memphis, Tennessee
- Broadcast area: Western Tennessee; Eastern Arkansas, Northern Mississippi, Kentucky’s Jackson Purchase Region; Nashville area

The Memphis Grizzlies Radio Network is the regionally delivered sports network featuring game coverage of the National Basketball Association franchise Memphis Grizzlies. The network is a joint venture between the franchise and Skyview Networks.

The network has broadcast Memphis Grizzlies basketball since the team relocated to Memphis from Vancouver, British Columbia (Canada) in 2001.

== Affiliates ==
=== Tennessee ===
Market	Station	Affiliation	Notes
Memphis	WMFS 680	ESPN Radio	Flagship station
Memphis	WMFS-FM 92.9	ESPN Radio	Flagship station
Brentwood/Nashville	WNSR 560	Infinity Sports Network	Also broadcasts at 95.9 FM via FM translator W240CA
Lexington/Jackson	WBFG 96.5	ESPN Radio	

=== Kentucky ===
Market	Station	Affiliation	Notes
Paducah	WDXR 1450		Also serves extreme southern Illinois, including Metropolis and Cairo
Drakesboro/Central City	WRFM 103.9 FM	Infinity Sports Network	Repeater of WNSR Brentwood, Tennessee.

=== Arkansas ===
Market	Station	Affiliation	Notes
Conway	KCON FM 92.7		
Forrest City/West Helena	KCLT FM 104.9; KAKJ FM 105.3		
Jonesboro	KNEA AM 970	Fox Sports Radio	
Stuttgart	KWAK AM 1240		

=== Missouri ===
Market	Station	Affiliation	Notes
Cape Girardeau	KGIR AM 1220		
Malden	KLSC 92.9FM & KMAL AM 1470		
St. Louis	KFNS 590 AM	Fox Sports Radio	Select Games

=== Mississippi ===
Market	Station	Notes
Booneville	WBIP AM 1400	
Jackson	WYAB 103.9 FM	
Tupelo	WTUP AM 1490	
