= KWEM =

KWEM may refer to:

- KWEM-LP, a low-power radio station (93.3 FM) licensed to serve West Memphis, Arkansas, United States
- KWAM, a radio station in Memphis, Tennessee, United States, that used the call letters KWEM from 1947 to 1959
