= WTCL =

WTCL may refer to:

- WTCL-LD, a low-power television station (channel 20, virtual 6) licensed to serve Cleveland, Ohio, United States
- WJXO, a radio station (1580 AM) licensed to serve Chattahoochee, Florida, United States, which held the call sign WTCL from 1988 to 2021
