= WEBL =

WEBL may refer to:

- WEBL (FM), a radio station (95.3 FM) licensed to serve Coldwater, Mississippi, United States
- WGLU, a radio station (102.5 FM) licensed to serve Warner Robins, Georgia, United States, which held the call sign WEBL from June 2004 to September 2008
- WEBL, a Dow Jones stock symbol used by Direxion
