= WXMX =

Radio station in Millington–Memphis, Tennessee

- Millington, Tennessee; United States
- Broadcast area: Greater Memphis
- Frequency: 98.1 MHz
- Branding: 98.1 The Max

Programming
- Format: Mainstream rock
- Affiliations: United Stations Radio Networks; Westwood One

Ownership
- Owner: Cumulus Media; (Radio License Holding CBC, LLC)
- Sister stations: WGKX, WKIM, WRBO

History
- First air date: April 12, 1960
- Former call signs: KOSE-FM (1960–1974); KHFO (1974–1986); KWLN (1986–1988); KMPZ (1988–1990); KPYR (1990–1992); WPYR (1992–1993); WYKL (1993–1995); WSRR-FM (1995–2005)

Technical information
- Licensing authority: FCC
- Facility ID: 35399
- Class: C1
- ERP: 100,000 watts
- HAAT: 265 meters (869 ft)
- Transmitter coordinates: 35.155°N 89.822°W

Links
- Public license information: Public file; LMS
- Webcast: Listen live
- Website: 981themax.com

WXMX (98.1 FM) is a commercial radio station licensed to Millington, Tennessee, and serving Greater Memphis. It airs a mainstream rock radio format branded as "98-1 The Max". WXMX is owned by Cumulus Media with studios at the Memphis Radio Group Building on Murray Avenue near Interstate 240 in East Memphis.

WXMX has an effective radiated power (ERP) of 100,000 watts, the maximum for most FM stations in the U.S. The transmitter site is off Raleigh Lagrange Road in Cordova, Tennessee.

== History ==
=== Easy listening: 1960-1988 ===
The station signed on the air on April 12, 1960. Its original call sign was KOSE-FM and it was located in Osceola, Arkansas, about 50 miles (80 km) north of Memphis, so it was difficult to hear in the Memphis area. At first, it largely simulcast its sister station, 860 KOSE. It later had an easy listening format.

=== Top 40: 1988-1990 ===
In the late 1980s, the station was given permission from the Federal Communications Commission to "move in" to the more lucrative Memphis radio market. The transmitter was relocated to a 700 feet (210 m) tower near Memphis at 100,000 watts. The call letters were WMPZ and the station was airing a Top 40 hits format.

=== Oldies: 1990-1995 ===
In 1990, the station became "Oldies 98" with a 1950s-60s based hits format. The station changed its call letters to KPYR in 1990 and WPYR in 1992. In 1993, the station relaunched as "Kool 98" with new call letters WYKL. However, the oldies format remained.

=== Classic Hits: 1995-2005 ===
In 1995, the station changed its call letters to WSRR-FM and its moniker to "Star 98 FM." The format originally consisted of music entirely from the 1970s. Over time, it expanded to include music from other decades while maintaining a classic hits format.

=== Rock: 2005-present ===
The station adopted its current mainstream rock format as "98-1 The Max" on April 1, 2005. The call letters were soon changed to WXMX. For many years, the station aired the Drake and Zeke morning show. In 2015, Zeke Logan died and the show became known as Drake in the Morning. The show lasted until 2020, when Drake Hall departed the station.

A new morning show was called Danni and the Jar, featuring Danni Bruns and Chris Jarman. In December 2020, Jarman died. The current wake-up drive time show is Danni and Country Cory in the Morning. In evenings, the nationally syndicated Steve Gorman Rocks is heard, hosted by Steve Gorman of the Black Crowes.
