= WIVG =

- Tunica, Mississippi; United States
- Broadcast area: Memphis, Tennessee
- Frequency: 96.1 MHz
- Branding: Air1

Programming
- Format: Worship music

Ownership
- Owner: Educational Media Foundation
- Sister stations: WMLE

History
- First air date: 1998 (as WMPS)
- Former call signs: WAUF (1997–1998); WJOI (1/1998-5/1998); WMPS (1998–2001); WYYL (2001–2006)

Technical information
- Licensing authority: FCC
- Facility ID: 67247
- Class: C3
- ERP: 4,100 watts
- HAAT: 246 meters (807 ft)
- Transmitter coordinates: 34°43′36.4″N 90°09′43.3″W

Links
- Public license information: Public file; LMS
- Webcast: Listen live
- Website: air1.com

WIVG (96.1 FM) is a radio station licensed to Tunica, Mississippi, serving the Memphis, Tennessee area with EMF's Air1 worship music format. Owned by Educational Media Foundation, the station's studios are located in Southeast Memphis, and the transmitter site is in Coldwater, Mississippi near Arkabutla Lake.

== History ==
=== Adult alternative (2004–2010) ===
From 2004 to 2010, the station aired an adult album alternative format called "The Pig." It previously aired on the stronger 107.5 FM. In 2020, "The Pig" moved again, this time to 87.7 FM.

=== Top 40/CHR (2010–2013) ===
From 2010 to 2013, the station simulcasted WHBQ-FM and its Top 40/CHR format.

=== Alternative (2012–2019) ===
On April 11, 2013, WIVG split from its simulcast with WHBQ-FM and began stunting with a loop of "Blister in the Sun" by Violet Femmes, and changed format to alternative rock at 4 p.m., branded as "96X".

=== Sports (2019–2021) ===
In June 2019, WIVG changed its format from alternative rock to a simulcast of sports-formatted WHBQ 560 AM Memphis, TN.

=== Rock (2021–2023) ===
On July 8, 2021, WIVG changed its format from a simulcast of sports-formatted WHBQ 560 AM to mainstream rock, branded as "Drake Hall Memphis Radio" (format moved from WPGF-LP 87.7 FM, which was to go off the air on July 13, 2021).

=== Air 1 (2023–present) ===
On January 16, 2023, WIVG changed its format from mainstream rock (which moved to online-only) to EMF's Air1 worship music format.
