= WMSO =

- Southaven, Mississippi; United States
- Broadcast area: Memphis metropolitan area
- Frequency: 1240 kHz
- Branding: Power 104.1 The Source

Programming
- Format: Urban adult contemporary

Ownership
- Owner: Flinn Broadcasting; (Arlington Broadcasting Company)
- Operator: ER Entertainment
- Sister stations: KXHT; WHBQ; WHBQ-FM; WMPS; WOWW; WPGF-LD

History
- First air date: 1990; 36 years ago
- Former call signs: WAVN (1989–1996); WBLZ (1996); WAVN (1996–2019)

Technical information
- Licensing authority: FCC
- Facility ID: 2801
- Class: C
- Power: 580 watts unlimited
- Transmitter coordinates: 34°58′57.0″N 90°0′45.0″W
- Translators: 104.1 W281BR (Memphis, Tennessee)

Links
- Public license information: Public file; LMS
- Webcast: Listen Live
- Website: power1041thesource.com

WMSO (1240 AM) is an urban adult contemporary formatted broadcast radio station licensed to Southaven, Mississippi, serving Metro Memphis. WMSO is owned by Flinn Broadcasting, and operated under an LMA by ER Entertainment.

== History ==
On May 13, 2019, WMSO changed its format from southern gospel to urban oldies, branded as "Memphis Soul 104.1".

On June 8, 2020, WMSO changed its format from urban oldies to classic hip hop, branded as "Bumpin 104.1".

On November 13, 2023, WMSO changed its format from urban adult contemporary and gospel to Regional Mexican, branded as "El Gallo 104.1".

On June 1, 2024, WMSO changed its format from Regional Mexican to urban adult contemporary, branded as "Power 104.1 The Source".

== FM translator ==
WMSO programming is relayed to an FM translator, which gives the listener the choice of FM with higher quality stereophonic sound. The translator is owned by Arlington Broadcasting Company.

Broadcast translator for WMSO
Call sign	Frequency	City of license	FID	ERP (W)	Class	FCC info
W281BR	104.1 FM	Memphis, Tennessee	89003	250	D	LMS
