= Vida Jane Butler =

American radio pioneer

Vida Jane Butler Joplin (1922–2007) was an American radio pioneer known on the air as Janie Joplin. She was an announcer on WHER in Memphis, Tennessee, which went on the air on October 29, 1955. The station was billed as the "First All-Girl Radio Station".

Joplin was told her first name was considered too old-fashioned and too Southern for WHER, where she worked as an announcer and a copywriter. After WHER went off the air in the early 1970s, Butler used her talents in radio commercials for station WHBQ. She was nominated for a CLIO Award for this work.

Joplin would always sign off her show by saying, "Be good and you'll be happy!"
