= WHRK =

Radio station in Memphis, Tennessee

- Memphis, Tennessee; United States
- Broadcast area: Memphis metropolitan area
- Frequency: 97.1 MHz (HD Radio)
- Branding: "K97"

Programming
- Format: Urban contemporary
- Subchannels: HD2: Christian radio "Radio by Grace"
- Affiliations: Premiere Networks

Ownership
- Owner: iHeartMedia; (iHM Licenses, LLC)
- Sister stations: KJMS, KWNW, WDIA, WEGR, WHAL-FM, WREC

History
- First air date: December 2, 1959
- Call sign meaning: Harold R. Krelstein, executive of former owner Plough Broadcasting

Technical information
- Facility ID: 54916
- Class: C1
- ERP: 100,000 watts
- HAAT: 167 meters (548 ft)
- Transmitter coordinates: 35°13′22″N 90°02′37″W
- Translator: 106.3 W292EL (Memphis) (HD2)

Links
- Webcast: Listen Live; HD2: Listen Live
- Website: k97fm.iheart.com HD2: radiobygrace.com

WHRK (97.1 FM "K97") is a commercial radio station licensed to Memphis, Tennessee. The station is owned by iHeartMedia and it airs an urban contemporary radio format. The station carries the nationally syndicated weekday morning show, The Breakfast Club, from co-owned Premiere Networks and based at WWPR-FM in New York City. The rest of the schedule is hosted by local DJs.

WHRK's studios and offices are located on Thousand Oaks Boulevard in Southeast Memphis. The transmitter site is off Benjestown Road in North Memphis.

WHRK broadcasts in the HD Radio format, with its HD-2 subchannel carrying Christian radio format, branded as "Radio by Grace".

== History ==
=== Classical WMPS-FM ===
On December 2, 1959, the station first signed on as WMPS-FM. It was the FM counterpart to WMPS (now WMFS) and ran at only 6,600 watts, a fraction of its power today.

WMPS-AM-FM were owned by the Plough Corporation, a pharmaceutical firm founded in Memphis that also had a radio division, with stations in Chicago, Atlanta, Boston and other cities. At first the two stations mostly simulcast. But during the 1960s and 1970s, WMPS-FM was separately programmed with a classical music format. In the 1970s, WMPS-FM got a boost to 100,000 watts, and then made a transition to a Progressive Rock format in an effort to take on then-Rock rival WMC-FM.

=== Switch to Rhythmic, CHUrban/Crossover, and Urban ===
In October 1976, the station flipped to a Rhythmic Contemporary format that featured disco, utilizing the same formula that its counterpart in Philadelphia, WCAU-FM, was using at the time. The call sign was changed in 1977 to WHRK, to honor Harold R. Krelstein, who had been the president and CEO of Plough Broadcasting, Inc. Krelstein retired in 1976. In 1977, he was awarded the National Association of Broadcasters Distinguished Service Award for his contributions to broadcasting and especially, radio. He died in July 1977.

WHRK's success with disco also paid off ratings-wise during the last four years of the genre's period. By 1981, a year after disco's demise, the station moved in a CHUrban/Crossover direction (what would now be considered rhythmic contemporary), featuring hip hop, freestyle, new jack swing, dance, pop, and R&B hits. When Billboard introduced its Crossover Chart in February 1987, WHRK was added to the panel as one of its reporters. By the end of 1989, WHRK had evolved into an Urban Contemporary format.

=== New Ownership ===
In 1985, Adams Communications bought the top AM and top FM stations in Memphis, aimed at the African American community: WHRK and WDIA, which airs a full service format for black listeners, including R&B, soul music and gospel, plus news, sports and talk. In 1988, noted African American radio executive Regan Henry bought WHRK and WDIA for $13 million.

In 1996, WHRK and WDIA were purchased by Chancellor Broadcasting. Chancellor also acquired WHRK's former urban competitor, KJMS. To avoid format overlap, KJMS moved to an urban adult contemporary direction, while WHRK continued as a more youthful urban station. A short time later, Chancellor was renamed AMFM, Inc., and was acquired by Clear Channel Communications in 1999. In 2014, Clear Channel became iHeartMedia.

== Station management ==
- General Manager: Michael Oppenheimer
- Program Director: Devin Steele
- Community Affairs Director: Jae Henderson
