= KQPN =

Coordinates: 35°14′46″N 90°08′49″W

Simulcasts WENO Nashville
- West Memphis, Arkansas; United States
- Broadcast area: Memphis metropolitan area
- Frequency: 730 kHz
- Branding: AM 760 & AM 730 The Flame

Programming
- Format: Conservative talk

Ownership
- Owner: F.W. Robbert Broadcasting; (KQPN, Inc.)
- Operator: Disruptor Radio, LLC

History
- First air date: December 1, 1961 (as KSUD)
- Former call signs: KSUD (1962–2005)
- Call sign meaning: In reference to its former ESPN Radio affiliation

Technical information
- Licensing authority: FCC
- Facility ID: 48749
- Class: B
- Power: 1,000 watts

Links
- Public license information: Public file; LMS
- Webcast: Listen Live
- Website: newstalk760.com

KQPN (730 AM) is a commercial radio station licensed to West Memphis, Arkansas, and serving the Memphis metropolitan area. It is owned by F.W. Robbert Broadcasting and operated by Disruptor Radio, LLC. The station is branded as "AM 760 & AM 730 The Flame". It broadcasts a conservative talk radio format. KQPN currently simulcasts WENO from Nashville.

KQPN broadcasts at 1,000 watts. Because AM 730 is a Canadian and Mexican clear channel frequency, KQPN uses a directional antenna at all times to avoid interfering with other stations. The transmitter is off Gammon Road in Marion, Arkansas.

== History ==
The station signed on the air on December 1, 1961, as KSUD. It played Top 40 hits. By 1963, the music was a mix of folk, country, and Southern gospel music. It later switched formats to include Christian radio programming and Contemporary Christian music.

In May 2005, KSUD flipped to all-sports, becoming an ESPN Radio Network affiliate. It changed its call sign to KQPN later that year. On August 4, 2008, ESPN programming moved to 680 WSMB from KQPN, and KQPN took over the Fox Sports programming from WSMB the next day.

KQPN became affiliated with Yahoo! Sports Radio on December 5, 2011, after Entercom-owned 790 WMC took Fox Sports Radio away from KQPN beginning on October 17, 2011. In 2016, Yahoo! Sports Radio switched its name to SB Nation Radio.
