= WJXO =

- Chattahoochee, Florida; United States
- Broadcast area: Tallahassee area
- Frequency: 1580 kHz

Ownership
- Owner: Mount Vernon Broadcasting LLC

History
- First air date: November 1, 1963 (as WSBP)
- Former call signs: WSBP (1963–1980); WENO (1980–1988); WTCL (1988–2021)

Technical information
- Licensing authority: FCC
- Facility ID: 37471
- Class: D
- Power: 10,000 watts day
- Transmitter coordinates: 30°40′14.00″N 84°50′0.00″W
- Translator: 100.1 W261DU (Chattahoochee) (CP)

Links
- Public license information: Public file; LMS

WJXO (1580 AM) is a radio station is licensed to Chattahoochee, Florida, United States. The station is owned by Mount Vernon Broadcasting LLC.

== History ==
The station's original call sign was WSBP, broadcasting a country format for most of its early history. The construction permit to build the station was first issued on January 22, 1962. It first signed on November 1, 1963, at 1,000 watts of daytime-only power and under the ownership of the Chattahoochee Broadcasting Company. Emory Pope was the company president.

WSBP was sold to Roscoe Fleetwood in stages between 1969 and 1973. On November 11, 1975, the station changed hands again, this time to Soundway Broadcasting Company, headed by president and general manager Erwin O'Conner. Prior to the sale that year, the FCC approved the station's request to increase the station's daytime power to five thousand watts. The change became effective January 22, 1979.

The call sign changed to WENO on January 29, 1980. On May 12, 1988, the station changed its call sign to WTCL.

WTCL went silent on December 24, 2013, after the collapse of an LMA to a prospective new owner; it remained mostly silent as its current owner sought a buyer or another LMA offer. On February 23, 2016, WTCL returned to the air with a 1980s hits format, branded as "Sunny Radio". It was the first affiliate of the format for Whiplash Community Radio, owner of KZOY in Sioux Falls, South Dakota and KZOI in Dakota City, Nebraska.

By 2018, however, Sunny was no longer operating the station, and Faith Radio of Tallahassee was broadcasting on it. Owner Metz, LLC, sold the station to Mount Vernon Broadcasting in 2018 for $50,000. The sale came after Hurricane Michael devastated the region; the $50,000 sale price consisted of payments advanced by Mount Vernon to pay for FCC filing fees. David Garcia, a Hispanic broadcaster, reached a deal for a new time brokerage agreement, but the COVID-19 pandemic derailed his plans, and Hurricane Sally caused damage to the studio building later in 2020. Further, Mount Vernon, which had attempted to finance WTCL's purchase with payments for the lease he held for KMRI in West Valley City, Utah, found itself not getting the money after the lessee fell behind on payments; in 2020, an earthquake collapsed its tower; the collapse and subsequent litigation cost $200,000 by mid-2021, at which time Wood was working with a local resident to potentially return the station to air.

The call letters were changed to WJXO on August 6, 2021.
