= Todd Starnes =

American journalist (born 1967)

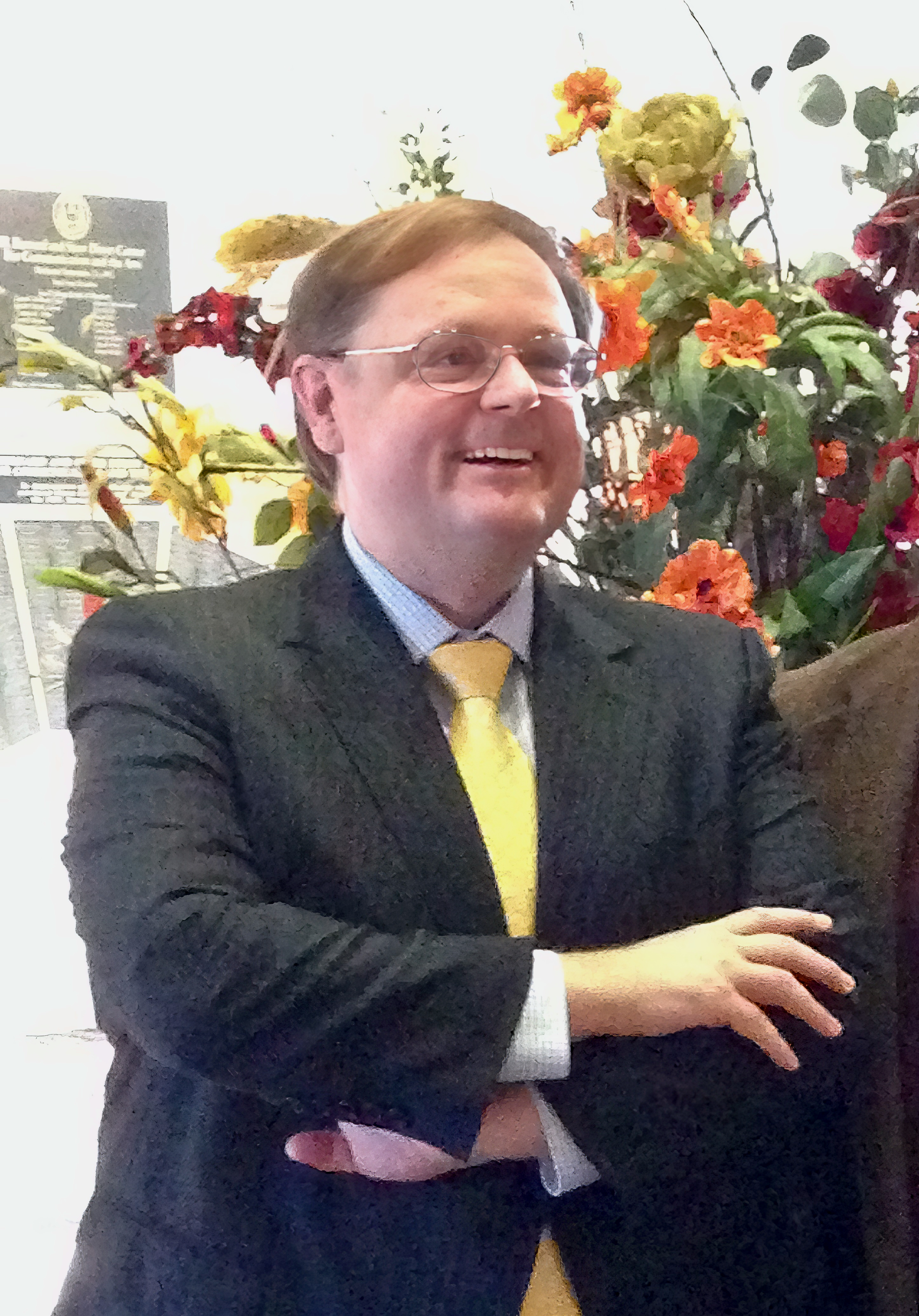
- Starnes at Lee University in 2013
- Born: October 28, 1967 (age 58); Memphis, Tennessee, U.S.
- Education: Lee University
- Occupations: Columnist; television personality; radio personality; writer; producer
- Known for: KWAM owner (2020-); Starnes Country host (2025–present)
- Awards: Edward R. Murrow Award
- Website: www.toddstarnes.com

Todd Starnes (born October 28, 1967) is an American conservative columnist, commentator, writer, and radio host. In June 2017, Starnes began hosting a syndicated talk radio show on Fox News Radio.

In January 2020, via his Starnes Media Group, he purchased Memphis talk station 990 AM KWAM, which would be the flagship station for Starnes' new radio show.

== Early life and career ==
Starnes was born in Memphis, Tennessee and raised in Southaven, Mississippi. He attended high school in southeastern Louisiana, where he also began his journalism career as a teenager at a small weekly newspaper. During the mid-1990s, he studied communication at Lee University in Cleveland, Tennessee, where he was an editor of the college newspaper, The Clarion.

Starnes was a reporter and anchor at news/talk radio station KFBK in Sacramento, California and a writer for the Baptist Press. Starnes joined Fox News Channel in 2005 as a radio news anchor.

In 2011, Starnes was named the host of Fox News & Commentary. He became a featured Fox News columnist in 2011. His column is read online and through syndication. Starnes is a frequent speaker at churches and Christian colleges.

== KWAM ==
In March 2020 the KWAM (990 AM) radio station was acquired by Starnes Media Group, led by Starnes. The purchase from Legacy Media included translator W300DE and Memphis (107.9 FM) at a total price of $685,000. Upon the close of the purchase on March 31, 2020, Starnes Media Group changed the station's branding to "The Mighty 990" (to reflect the history of the station).

The Salem Podcast Network began distributing the Todd Starnes Podcast on April 5, 2021 after agreeing to a partnership. In December 2023, Starnes Media Group, signed a deal for the Newsmax cable news channel to simulcast an hour of his nationally-syndicated radio program, "The Todd Starnes Show." The show airs weekdays at noon ET and focuses on conservative commentary, politics, and cultural issues.

After the exit of Ben Deeter in early May 2025, Starnes himself stepped in as morning host with a new show. Starnes Country began July 23, 2025, borrowing the name from a show Starnes hosted on the FOX Nation streaming platform.

== Awards, honors, distinctions ==
Starnes, noting how KWAM has been recognized for broadcasting excellence, said: “KWAM is the only radio station in the Mid-South to win a regional Edward R. Murrow Award. The station has also been honored multiple times by the Tennessee Association of Broadcasters for our news coverage and our talk programs.”

Starnes himself has received a number of awards and honors throughout his career in broadcasting and journalism, including:

- RTNDA Edward R. Murrow Awards
- Associated Press Mark Twain Award for Storytelling
- National Religious Broadcasters Board of Directors Award (2014)
- First Liberty Institute's Defender of the Faith Award
- Vision America's National Hero of the Faith Award
- Bott Radio Network's Watchman on the Wall Award
- Pacific Justice Institute's Light in Media Award
- Americans for Prosperity Grassroots Journalism Award

== Views ==
Starnes' strongly conservative views, which he likes "to spice it up a little bit" to generate reader interest, have also generated controversy. For example, In 2015, Starnes referred to removing symbols of the old Confederacy from public places as "cultural cleansing" on his radio show. His 2017 book, The Deplorables' Guide to Making America Great Again debuted on the USA Today, Publishers Weekly, and Conservative Book Club's best seller lists. The New York Times, however, did not list the book as one of its top 10 non-fiction paperback books.

In 2003, when employed by the Baptist Press, Starnes misquoted U.S. Secretary of Education Rod Paige from an interview. Ultimately, the Baptist Press issued an apology noting "factual and contextual errors" and "misrepresentations" made by Starnes and saying that he "no longer will be employed to write for the Baptist Press".

== Personal ==
Starnes maintains a discreet personal life. In 2005, he underwent surgery for a near-fatal heart valve condition exacerbated by obesity, the subject of his first book, They Popped My Hood and Found Gravy on the Dipstick (2009). He currently lives in Memphis, Tennessee, where he owns and operates the news talk radio station KWAM.

== Publications ==
- Starnes, Todd (2012). Dispatches from Bitter America: A Gun-Toting, Chicken-Eating Son of a Baptist's Culture War Stories. Brentwood, Tennessee: B&H Books. ISBN 978-1433672750.
- Starnes, Todd (2014). God Less America: Real Stories From the Front Lines of the Attack on Traditional Values. New York, New York: Frontline. ISBN 978-1621365914.
- Starnes, Todd (2017). The Deplorables' Guide to Making America Great Again. New York, New York: Frontline. ISBN 978-1629991856.
- Starnes, Todd (2019). Culture Jihad: How to Stop the Left from Killing a Nation. New York, New York: Post Hill Press. ISBN 978-1642931662.
- Starnes, Todd (2024). Twilight's Last Gleaming: Can America Be Saved?. New York, New York: Post Hill Press. ISBN 978-1637584781.
- Starnes, Todd (2026). The Golden Age: How Trump Saved America. West Palm Beach, Florida: Humanix Books. ISBN 978-1630063412.
