= KNEA =

- Jonesboro, Arkansas; United States
- Frequency: 970 kHz
- Branding: 95.3 The Ticket

Programming
- Format: Sports
- Affiliations: Fox Sports Radio; Memphis Grizzlies Radio Network

Ownership
- Owner: East Arkansas Broadcasters of Jonesboro, LLC

History
- First air date: September 5, 1950
- Call sign meaning: Northeast Arkansas

Technical information
- Licensing authority: FCC
- Facility ID: 31609
- Class: D
- Power: 1,000 watts day 41 watts night
- Transmitter coordinates: 35°51′17″N 90°43′45″W
- Translators: 95.3 K237FI (Jonesboro); 96.9 K245CW (Jonesboro)

Links
- Public license information: Public file; LMS
- Webcast: Listen Live
- Website: 953theticket.com

KNEA (970 kHz) is a radio station broadcasting a sports format. Licensed to Jonesboro, Arkansas, United States, it serves the Jonesboro area. The station is currently owned by East Arkansas Broadcasters of Jonesboro, LLC. It is also the flagship station for the EAB Red Wolves Sports Network's broadcasts of Arkansas State University baseball and women's basketball.

The station currently airs a mix of local sport shows and is a Fox Sports affiliate. Local shows are hosted or co-hosted by Bud Schroeppel, Brad Bobo, Randy Myers and Kara Richey.

Former logo
