= KWEM-LP =

- West Memphis, Arkansas; United States
- Frequency: 93.3 MHz

Programming
- Format: Blues/gospel

Ownership
- Owner: Arkansas State University Mid-South; (Mid-South Community College)

History
- Founded: 2014
- First air date: 2015
- Call sign meaning: West Memphis; tribute to former KWEM

Technical information
- Licensing authority: FCC
- Facility ID: 193203
- ERP: 45 watts
- HAAT: 45 meters (148 ft)
- Transmitter coordinates: 35°11′24.3″N 90°15′26.3″W

Links
- Public license information: LMS
- Webcast: Listen live
- Website: kwemradio.com

KWEM-LP is a low-power FM radio station in West Memphis, Arkansas, United States, owned by Arkansas State University Mid-South. The station airs a format of blues and gospel music and is also used as a training ground for students in the community college's digital media program.

The call letters and format are a tribute to a former West Memphis radio station, KWEM (990 AM), which began in 1947; moved across the Mississippi River to Memphis, Tennessee, in 1953; and changed call letters in 1959. The station was influential in the early careers of several blues and rockabilly musicians.

== History ==
=== The original KWEM ===
The owners of Little Rock-area radio station KXLR sought to build a statewide network of stations to carry Arkansas Razorbacks football, and they felt that the Memphis area would provide important coverage and exposure for the football program. After delays, KWEM (990 AM) began operating on February 9, 1947, with official opening two weeks later.

West Memphis was described as the "Las Vegas of the South" in this era, and its programming drew from the musicians playing clubs in that era. Howlin' Wolf had a show on the station from 1949 to 1952, and Sam Phillips heard him and signed him to a contract with Sun Records; his program aired after music by rockabilly guitarist Paul Burlison; B.B. King was first heard over the station, getting his break on a show helmed by Sonny Boy Williamson II; Stax Records founder Jim Stewart started at KWEM, as did James Cotton and Hubert Sumlin; Johnny Cash's first radio broadcast was on KWEM in 1953. The station allowed aspiring performers to pay for 15-minute blocks of air time. Elvis Presley made his first radio appearance on KWEM in 1953, which did not go well because he lacked a band and moved around too much; George Klein worked there as a DJ after its move to Memphis; so did Eddie Bond.

KWEM was purchased by Dee Rivers in 1951. Rivers moved the station to Memphis, where from studios on Flicker Street, it continued to be an influential hotbed of talent; the transmitter remained on the Arkansas side of the river. This lasted through the end of the decade, when KWEM became KWAM, and it eventually stopped playing live music.

=== The revival ===
In 2009, Dale Franklin purchased assets to relaunch KWEM as an online-only station, playing the genres of music where it had the most influence. In addition, he acquired such historic artifacts as a recording lathe used by Ike Turner. Franklin's goal was to increase recognition of KWEM's historical role and increase musical tourism on the Arkansas side of the Mississippi by restoring the original studio on Broadway Street. He then opted to sell these assets to Mid-South Community College in West Memphis. Streaming returned under MSCC management in 2014 ahead of the station's 2015 sign-on on FM.

Franklin, who was described by the president of MSCC as having a "John the Baptist type fervor" for the project, died in 2017.
