= WNSR =

- Brentwood, Tennessee; United States
- Broadcast area: Nashville metropolitan area
- Frequency: 560 kHz
- Branding: WNSR SportsRadio

Programming
- Format: Sports Radio
- Affiliations: Infinity Sports Network; Atlanta Braves Radio Network; Memphis Grizzlies Radio Network; Tennessee State Tigers and Lady Tigers Network

Ownership
- Owner: Southern Wabash Communications of Middle Tennessee, Inc.
- Sister stations: WPDQ

History
- First air date: September 4, 1985; 40 years ago
- Former call signs: WTBN (1981–1985); WWCR (1985–1987); WYOR (1987–1998)
- Call sign meaning: "Nashville's Sports Radio"

Technical information
- Licensing authority: FCC
- Facility ID: 41062
- Class: D
- Power: 1,000 watts (day); 75 watts (night)
- Transmitter coordinates: 36°08′27″N 86°45′23″W
- Translators: 95.9 W240CA (Brentwood); 104.9 W285FB (Brentwood); 107.9 W300DO (Smyrna)
- Repeater: 103.9 WRFM (Drakesboro, Kentucky)

Links
- Public license information: Public file; LMS
- Webcast: Listen live
- Website: wnsr.com

WNSR (560 AM) is a commercial radio station licensed to Brentwood, Tennessee, and serving the Nashville metropolitan area. It broadcasts a sports radio format, airing a mix of local sports talk shows on weekday mornings and middays with programs from the Infinity Sports Network at other times. Local programming includes The Bill King Show, which airs 6-9am Monday through Friday.The majority owner is Randolph Victor Bell with the license held by Southern Wabash Communications of Middle Tennessee, Inc. The studios are on Nolansville Pike (U.S. Route 41A) near Interstate 440 in Nashville.

By day, WNSR is powered at 1,000 watts using a non-directional antenna, it reduces power to 75 watts at night to avoid interference to other stations on 560 AM. Programming is also heard on 103.9 WRFM in Drakesboro, Kentucky, about 80 miles (130 km) north of Nashville. It is also heard on three FM translators in the Nashville area: 95.9 W240CA and 104.9 W285FB, both in Brentwood and 107.9 W300DO in Smyrna.

== History ==
In 1981, a construction permit was granted to build a new AM station near Nashville on 560 kHz. It was given the call sign WTBN. The station signed on the air on September 4, 1985. At that point, its call letters were WWCR and it was a daytimer, required to go off the air at night. It was owned by American Media Productions and had a daytime power of 500 watts, airing adult contemporary music.

The station converted to its current format in 1996, with the call letters WYOR, as syndicated sports radio programming became a popular radio format.

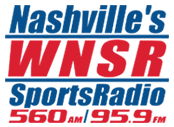
Former logo

In the past, WNSR was affiliated with Yahoo! Sports Radio (formerly Sporting News Radio). In addition, it aired some NBC Sports Radio programs. The station also broadcasts local sports, both talk shows and play-by-play, as well as national shows from the Infinity Sports Network, previously CBS Sports Radio. It also carries live Atlanta Braves baseball games and Memphis Grizzlies basketball games as well as Tennessee State Tigers and Lady Tigers sports.

== See also ==
- List of Nashville media
