= KJMS =

Radio station in Olive Branch, Mississippi, serving Memphis, Tennessee

- Olive Branch, Mississippi; United States
- Broadcast area: Memphis, Tennessee
- Frequency: 101.1 MHz (HD Radio)
- Branding: V101

Programming
- Format: Urban adult contemporary
- Subchannels: HD2: Black Information Network
- Affiliations: Premiere Networks

Ownership
- Owner: iHeartMedia, Inc.; (iHM Licenses, LLC)
- Sister stations: KWNW, WDIA, WEGR, WHAL-FM, WHRK, WREC

History
- First air date: March 10, 1965
- Former call signs: KLYX (1965–1969); KWAM-FM (1969–1982); KRNB (1982–1990); KHUL (1990–1991); KRNB (1991)
- Call sign meaning: "K-Jams"

Technical information
- Licensing authority: FCC
- Facility ID: 35874
- Class: C1
- ERP: 100,000 watts
- HAAT: 171 metres (561 ft)
- Transmitter coordinates: 35°13′22.3″N 90°02′36.3″W

Links
- Public license information: Public file; LMS
- Webcast: Listen Live; Listen Live (HD2)
- Website: myv101.iheart.com memphis.binnews.com (HD2)

KJMS (101.1 FM) is an urban adult contemporary radio station in Memphis, Tennessee, and serving the Mid-South, area, owned by iHeartMedia, Inc. The station's studios are located in southeast Memphis, and the transmitter site is in north Memphis.

KJMS broadcasts in HD.

== History ==
=== KLYX and KWAM-FM ===
KWAM, Incorporated, filed a construction permit for a new FM radio station in Memphis on September 12, 1963. The Federal Communications Commission approved the application on January 24, 1964. The station took the call letters KLYX before signing on March 10, 1965. After four years, the call letters were changed to KWAM-FM. (While the station has always been licensed east of the Mississippi River, KWAM had been founded in West Memphis, Arkansas.)

=== KRNB as Majic 101 ===
On January 4, 1982, KWAM flipped to an CHR/urban contemporary ("churban") as "Majic 101". The station was the fourth urban outlet in the Memphis market, competing with WHRK. Soon changing its call letters to KRNB, the new station made an immediate impact on the market, moving from last place to an 11 share. In 1990, the station rebranded as KHUL "Cool 101", an urban adult contemporary outlet. Today, the KRNB call letters are held on a station in the Dallas/Fort Worth metroplex with the same format (though this KRNB is a rimshot).

=== As KJMS ===
In 1991, the KHUL calls would be dropped for KJMS as "K-Jams", going head to head with WHRK for the mainstream urban audience. KHUL continued to rate respectably, though it never beat WHRK.

In 1996, Ragan Henry's U.S. Radio acquired KWAM and KJMS from the Dee Rivers Group for $12.5 million, as U.S. Radio itself was in the process of being purchased by Clear Channel. The purchase brought WHRK and KJMS under common ownership and prompted KJMS to shift to urban adult contemporary.

Until January 2019, KJMS aired the Tom Joyner morning show. He was replaced with a local morning show featuring Mike Evans, Earle Augustus, and Stormy Taylor.
