= WRFM (FM) =

Simulcast of WNSR Brentwood, Tennessee
- Drakesboro, Kentucky; United States
- Frequency: 103.9 MHz
- Branding: WNSR Sportsradio

Programming
- Format: Sports radio
- Affiliations: Infinity Sports Network

Ownership
- Owner: Nashville's Sportsradio, Incorporated

History
- First air date: 1999; 27 years ago
- Former call signs: WNTC (1997–2020); WPDQ (2020–2021)

Technical information
- Licensing authority: FCC
- Facility ID: 85772
- Class: A
- ERP: 1,950 watts
- HAAT: 124 meters (407 ft)
- Transmitter coordinates: 37°6′50″N 87°3′52″W

Links
- Public license information: Public file; LMS
- Webcast: Listen live
- Website: www.wnsr.com

WRFM (103.9 MHz) is an FM radio station broadcasting a sports format, licensed to Drakesboro, Kentucky, United States. The station is currently owned by Nashville's Sportsradio, Incorporated and features programming from Infinity Sports Network. This programming is a simulcast of Nashville-market AM radio station WNSR.

== History ==
The station signed on the air as WNTC in 1999 under ownership of the Evansville, Indiana-based Southern Wabash Communications Corporation, which was granted the station's construction permit two years prior. Upon sign-on, it became the third FM radio station to sign on in Muhlenberg County.

Former logo

In October 2001, the station was acquired by Nashville Sportsradio, Inc., which in turn is a division of Southern Wabash Communications. That company, which owns WNSR of Brentwood, Tennessee, converted the station into a full-time repeater of that station, hence making a sports radio station. This makes the WNSR coverage area expanded into the Kentucky portion of the Clarksville, Tennessee—Hopkinsville, Kentucky radio market, and making coverage available well into portions of many Kentucky counties, including Butler, Logan, Ohio, McLean, and Hopkins counties.

On June 25, 2020, WNTC switched call letters with 91.3 FM in Scottsville, Kentucky, and became WPDQ. Those call letters returned to Scottsville in October 2021, and this facility became WRFM.
