= KLRG (North Little Rock, Arkansas) =

North Little Rock, Arkansas; United States
- Frequency: 1150 kHz

History
- First air date: April 15, 1946
- Last air date: June 2004
- Former call signs: KXLR (1946–1983); KBOX (1983–1986); KEZQ (1986–1990)
- Former frequencies: 1450 kHz (1946–1953)

Technical information
- Facility ID: 2778
- Power: 5,000 watts day 1,000 watts night

KLRG was a radio station licensed to North Little Rock, Arkansas, United States. It was on the air from 1946 to 2004 under the call letters KXLR, KBOX, KEZQ, and KLRG. Its last owner, Willis Broadcasting Corporation, programmed a gospel music format and surrendered KLRG's broadcast license as part of a settlement with the Federal Communications Commission.

== History ==
=== KXLR ===
On December 13, 1945, the Federal Communications Commission granted the Arkansas Airwaves Company a construction permit for a new radio station on 1450 kHz in North Little Rock. The consortium was headed by Phil Back, head of a local advertising agency who believed Little Rock could support another local radio station. The new station was installed in the Cotton Belt Building with a tower placed between the levee and the Arkansas River. After construction was completed earlier than expected, broadcasting officially began April 14, 1946, as the first new radio station to be built in Arkansas after World War II.

In its early years, KXLR played a key role in sports broadcasting in Arkansas. John Wells, the station manager, had previously been the correspondent covering Arkansas Razorbacks football for the Arkansas Gazette newspaper, and KXLR—despite being a 250-watt local outlet—organized a statewide network of stations to air the Razorbacks games with sponsorship from the Reynolds Metals Company. The Razorback Network soon planted the seeds of stations across Arkansas. From 1946 to 1948, the network built or provided support to start KHOZ in Harrison, KWEM in West Memphis, and KWAK in Stuttgart. In 1951, KXLR was approved to switch from 1450 kHz with 250 watts to 1150 kHz, where it could use the higher power level of 5,000 watts during the day and 1,000 at night; the actual frequency switch took place on January 14, 1953. However, KXLR's effort to expand to television was less successful. It filed for channel 11, as did KTHS (1090 AM), but KXLR opted to withdraw from the contest in October 1954 in a move that paved the way for KTHV to be built.

Arkansas Airwaves sold KXLR to J. M. Sanders, president of a Dallas advertising agency, in December 1956. Sanders revamped KXLR's format and made it a popular Top 40 station in the area. The outlet was sold three years later to Arkansas Broadcasting, Inc., whose principals were all from Dallas; after a change in membership, it renamed itself Little Rock Great Empire Broadcasting in 1963.

KXLR was purchased in 1969 by Starr Broadcasting Company, a company owned by conservative political commentator and National Review founder William F. Buckley Jr. Of the four stations purchased at the same time, KXLR was the outlier—it had a country music format instead of the Black programming that the other three outlets, such as WLOK in Memphis, were airing. Starr continued to own KXLR until 1979, when it sold its entire portfolio to Shamrock Broadcasting.

=== KBOX, KEZQ, and KLRG ===
In 1981, Shamrock Broadcasting put KXLR up for sale. However, the station was not actually sold for another two years, when KEZQ Limited Partnership purchased the station for $500,000. KEZQ Limited Partnership owned FM station KEZQ and AM station KIEL (1500 AM), both licensed to Jacksonville, and opted to divest the latter with its inferior facility to acquire KXLR. That September, the KXLR call sign disappeared from the station for the first time since its sign-on when the new owners relaunched it as Top 40-formatted KBOX. The AM outlet moved into KEZQ's studios, and its old facility was donated to the Pentecostal Church of God of Rose City, which planned to start an FM station. KBOX abandoned its separate format and call letters to become KEZQ, simulcasting the FM station and its easy listening format, in August 1986; the station continued to break from the FM for certain sports broadcasts. The AM was eventually used to broadcast a loop of recorded traffic information, a concept that failed to catch on.

KEZQ AM was then purchased by Bishop L. E. Willis of Norfolk, Virginia, in 1990. Willis switched the station to a Black gospel music format under a new KLRG call sign. This continued for 14 years, even though trouble arose at the Willis cluster of KLRG and KMZX (106.3 FM) in 1994. After paychecks started to be missed, both stations began going on and off the air erratically—and simultaneously, even though the two stations were not located at the same site. Though the station blamed technical troubles, an unnamed employee told the Arkansas Democrat-Gazette, "We all had a meeting, and we pulled the plug." Willis was behind $30,000 on payments to a past landlord; some employees, citing the gospel format and its mission, opted to stay even though they were not paid. A reporter for the newspaper described its business office as "spartan and barely looks as if it houses a business".

Issues with the FCC ultimately led to the surrender of KLRG's broadcast license. Beginning in 1999, field inspections of several Willis stations by FCC staff led to the discovery of violations and resultant fines, which went unpaid and led to a default judgment against Willis's company, Willis Broadcasting Corporation. In June 2004, Willis Broadcasting Corporation entered into a consent decree with the commission under which it surrendered the licenses of KLRG and stations in Louisiana, North Carolina, and Florida.
