= WMFS (AM) =

Simulcast of WMFS-FM, Bartlett
- Memphis, Tennessee; United States
- Broadcast area: Memphis metropolitan area
- Frequency: 680 kHz
- Branding: ESPN 92.9

Programming
- Language: English
- Format: Sports radio
- Affiliations: ESPN Radio; Compass Media Networks; Memphis Grizzlies Radio Network

Ownership
- Owner: Audacy, Inc.; (Audacy License, LLC)
- Sister stations: WLFP; WMC; WMFS-FM; WRVR

History
- First air date: 1925
- Former call signs: WGBC (1924–1931) & WNBR (1927–1931); WNBR-WGBC (1931–1933); WNBR (1933–1937); WMPS (1937–1983); WKDJ (1983–1992); WEZI (1992–1993); WOGY (1993); WJCE (1993–2005); WWTQ (2005–2006); WSMB (2006–2009)
- Call sign meaning: Disambiguation of its former WMPS calls for a past owner, the Memphis Press-Scimitar, along with a phonetic spelling of Memphis

Technical information
- Licensing authority: FCC
- Facility ID: 34374
- Class: B
- Power: 8,000 watts day 5,000 watts night
- Transmitter coordinates: 35°13′22″N 90°02′37″W
- Repeater: 92.9 WMFS-FM (Bartlett)

Links
- Public license information: Public file; LMS
- Webcast: Listen live (via Audacy)
- Website: www.audacy.com/929espn

WMFS (680 kHz) is a commercial AM radio station located in Memphis, Tennessee. WMFS airs sports radio programming branded as "ESPN 680AM Sports Radio Memphis". The station simulcasts with WMFS-FM 92.9. As of the 2007 baseball season, WMFS has become the home of St. Louis Cardinals broadcasts in the Memphis area. It also broadcasts Tennessee Volunteers football and basketball games.

The station's license is held by Audacy, Inc. It is one of five radio properties in the Memphis market held by Audacy; the others are WLFP, WRVR-FM, WMC, and WMFS-FM. WMFS maintains studios in the Audacy complex in Southeast Memphis, and has a transmitter tower in North Memphis.

== History ==
The station traces its origin to the establishment of WGBC, first licensed on November 14, 1924, to the First Baptist Church of Memphis. On November 11, 1928, with the implementation of the Federal Radio Commission's General Order 40, WGBC was assigned to Sunday-only operation on 1430 kHz, sharing this frequency with WNBR. (WNBR had been first licensed on February 18, 1927, to "Popular Radio Shop (John Ulrich)" at 883 Poplar Avenue in Memphis.) In 1930, both WGBC and WNBR were purchased by the Memphis Broadcasting Company, and in 1931 were consolidated under the dual call sign of WNBR-WGBC. On May 15, 1933, the WGBC call letters were dropped, and the station became just WNBR.

The Memphis Press-Scimitar bought the station in 1937 and changed the call letters to WMPS, moving it to Columbia Mutual Tower on Court Square. WMC, owned by rival paper Commercial Appeal, carried the Red Network.

In the 1930s, WMPS aired broadcasts of the NBC Radio Blue Network, including Bob Hope, the NBC Symphony Orchestra, the Metropolitan Opera radio broadcasts, and Amos and Andy. Local programming on WMPS included country and western music (often called "Hillbilly" music). Kay Starr and Eddy Arnold gave some of their earliest performances on WMPS, which also aired The Carter Family, Jimmie Rodgers, Bill and Charlie Monroe, and Bob Wills. "Smiling" Eddie Hill of The Grand Ole Opry went to work at WMPS in 1947, leading the house band that included Ira and Charlie Louvin, who wrote songs for Bill Monroe, Emmylou Harris, James Taylor, Mark Knopfler, Alison Krauss and Ray Charles. Johnny Cash later recalled hearing the Eddie Hill band featuring the Louvin Brothers on the radio, and program director Bob Neal played his "Hey Porter" and "Cry! Cry! Cry!" in 1955. Sonny James later led another band which performed on WMPS. In 1941, with the implementation of the North American Regional Broadcasting Agreement, the station moved to 1460 kHz.

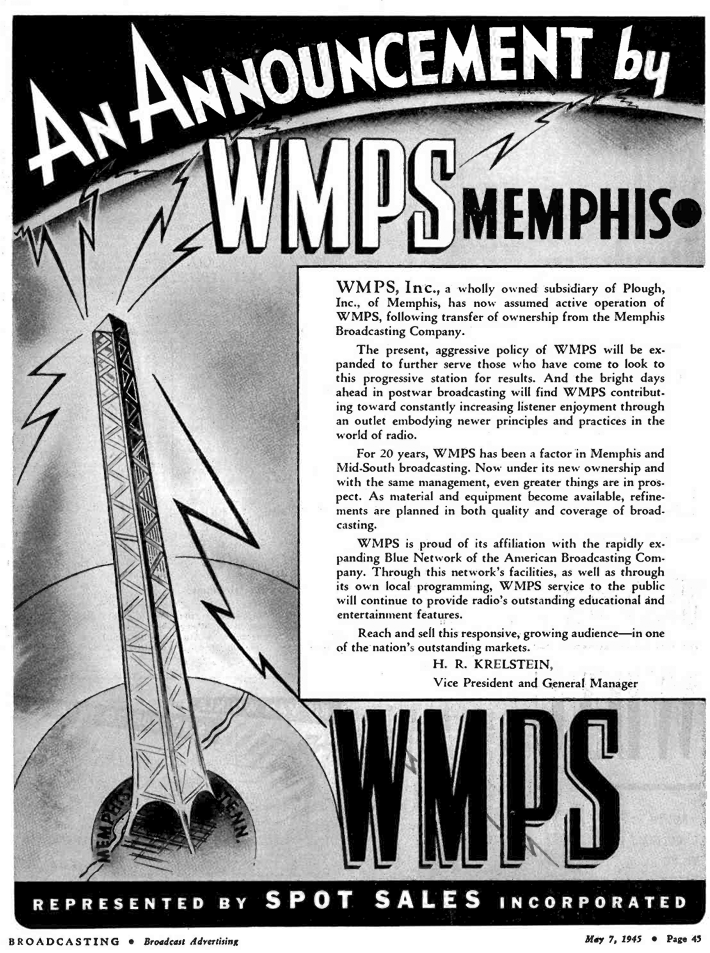
1945 advertisement announcing station's purchase by a subsidiary of Plough, Inc.

Plough, Incorporated bought WMPS in 1945, and in 1947, the station moved to 680 kHz. Radio Center was finished in 1949 and later used for WDIA. WMPS also switched to ABC Radio.

Eddie Hill returned to WSM in 1951 and Charlie Louvin served in The Korean War, but Ira Louvin stayed at WMPS as a DJ. The Blackwood Brothers performed on WMPS until the station switched to Top 40 in 1954. By that time, Elvis Presley had already heard the Blackwood Brothers on the radio and had become a fan. Neal continued a country and western show. When Neal left, WMPS and competing Top 40 WHBQ were the no. 1 and no. 2 stations in Memphis for the next 15 years, but radio had changed. Top 40 DJs were different, and they could not play just any song. They had to go by what was actually selling.

Later, though, WMPS began to emphasize personalities once again. WMPS soon played the "Memphis Sound" of blues, soul and funk Roy Mack worked with the Devilles and changed their names to The Box Tops. Another WMPS DJ who became well known was Rick Dees, who recorded "Disco Duck" while at WMPS. He was fired from WMPS because of conflict of interest and suspected payola, but WHBQ hired him, eventually winning the Top 40 wars before the format left AM. WMPS switched to country music in 1978. In 1983, WMPS switched to an R&B format attempting to compete with WDIA and WLOK. They also changed the call letters to WKDJ.

Plough later sold WMPS and the new owners changed the call letters several times. In 1992, WKDJ began simulcasting FM sister station WODZ and their oldies format (which later flipped to country in February 1993). In October 1993, WOGY switched to a classic soul format as "The Juice." (The WMPS letters returned in 2001 to another area station.) The format would later be changed to adult standards as "Easy 680".

WJCE became WWTQ and added Air America progressive talk radio on January 28, 2005. In late 2007, Air America was dropped, with the station flipping to its current sports talk format, and changing call letters to WSMB.

WSMB became an ESPN affiliate on August 4, 2008. Fox Sports moved from WSMB to KQPN at 730 AM the next day.

In 2009, a simulcast was added on FM, at 92.9 WMFS-FM.

Beginning in the 2011–12 station, WMFS became the flagship station for the NBA's Memphis Grizzlies.

== Call sign history ==
The station picked up the historic WSMB from New Orleans' Entercom-owned 1350 AM in November 2006 when it was resigned as WWWL. Previous call signs include WWTQ (1/28/2005), WJCE (11/26/1993), WOGY (6/14/1993), and WEZI (2/21/1992).
