= WGKX =

Coordinates: 35.155°N 89.822°W

- Memphis, Tennessee; United States
- Broadcast area: Memphis metropolitan area
- Frequency: 105.9 MHz
- Branding: Kix 106

Programming
- Format: Country
- Affiliations: Westwood One

Ownership
- Owner: Cumulus Media; (Radio License Holding CBC, LLC)
- Sister stations: WKIM, WRBO, WXMX

History
- First air date: 1968 (as WHBQ-FM)
- Former call signs: WHBQ-FM (1968–1973); WEZI (1973–1983)
- Call sign meaning: W G KiX

Technical information
- Facility ID: 35009
- Class: C
- ERP: 100,000 watts
- HAAT: 302.6 meters (993 ft)

Links
- Webcast: Listen live
- Website: kix106.com

WGKX (105.9 FM, "Kix 106") is a country music formatted radio station in Memphis, Tennessee. It is owned by Cumulus Media. The station's studios are located at the Memphis Radio Group building in East Memphis, and the transmitter site is in Cordova, Tennessee.

== History ==
The station began in 1968 as WHBQ-FM, sister to WHBQ (AM) 560 AM and WHBQ-TV, Channel 13. It was originally owned by RKO General, until 1972, when it was sold to new owners who flipped the station to easy listening music and adopted the WEZI calls on January 12, 1973. By 1983, after several ownership changes, the station became owned by Barnstable Broadcasting, which adopted the current call letters, format and the name KIX 106.

In February, 1986 Barnstable hired the first known husband/wife team in morning radio, Andy and Debbie Montgomery, who enjoyed top ratings from 1986 until a two-year sabbatical in 1995 when they pursued other radio interests, returning from 1997 until April, 2003.

Citadel Broadcasting bought the station and three others from Barnstable in 2004.

Duane Shannon and Abby Summers, known as Duane and Abby, previously on WOGT Chattanooga, replaced Brian Elder and Jay Young in the morning late in 2010. Duane and Abby are one of the few married morning teams. Citadel merged with Cumulus Media on September 16, 2011.
