= KXHT =

Hip-hop focused radio station serving the Memphis, Tennessee, area

- Marion, Arkansas; United States
- Broadcast area: Memphis, Tennessee
- Frequency: 107.1 MHz
- Branding: Hot 107.1

Programming
- Format: Mainstream Urban

Ownership
- Owner: Flinn Broadcasting Corporation
- Sister stations: WHBQ, WHBQ-FM, WMPS, WMSO, WOWW

History
- First air date: June 1997

Technical information
- Facility ID: 5213
- Class: A
- ERP: 2,750 watts
- HAAT: 146 meters
- Transmitter coordinates: 35.1565°N 90.0962°W

Links
- Webcast: Listen Live
- Website: hot1071.com

KXHT (107.1 FM) is a mainstream urban radio station licensed to Marion, Arkansas and serves the Memphis, Tennessee, area. The Flinn Broadcasting outlet operates with an ERP of 2.75 kW. The station's studios are located in Southeast Memphis, and the transmitter site is in West Memphis, Arkansas along the west shore of the Mississippi River.

== History ==
The station began targeting the Memphis area in the late 1980s with an All-Blues format. In 1996 it flipped to a Mainstream Urban direction, but it wouldn't be until 1997 when it shifted to a Rhythmic Contemporary Hits direction and adopted the KXHT calls and the "HOT 107.1" moniker. Today the station focuses mostly on Hip-Hop product (they phased out most of the vocal-driven R&B hits, especially the slow songs), complete with non-stop mixes and capitalizing on the Southern Rap genre, especially the Crunk tracks.

In August 2006, Nielsen BDS had moved KXHT from the Rhythmic Airplay panel to the Urban Contemporary Airplay panel, but by May 2007 it placed the station back on the Rhythmic panel, as their direction and playlists reflected what was currently being played on the BDS-monitored Rhythmic chart rather than Urban. By April 2014, BDS returned KXHT to the R&B/Hip-Hop panel after adjusting its playlist and direction.
