= WMPS =

- Bartlett, Tennessee; United States
- Broadcast area: Memphis metropolitan area
- Frequency: 1210 kHz
- Branding: Sunny 1210 & 103.1

Programming
- Format: Adult standards; Soft oldies

Ownership
- Owner: Flinn Broadcasting Corporation; (Arlington Broadcasting Company)
- Sister stations: KXHT, WHBQ, WHBQ-FM, WMSO, WOWW

History
- First air date: August 19, 1986
- Former call signs: WGSF (1981–2000); WTCK (2000–2004); WWCZ (2004)
- Call sign meaning: taken from the former WMPS in Memphis

Technical information
- Licensing authority: FCC
- Facility ID: 2802
- Class: B
- Power: 10,000 watts (day); 250 watts (night)
- Transmitter coordinates: 35°15′40.00″N 89°49′50.00″W
- Translator: 103.1 W276BH (Memphis)

Links
- Public license information: Public file; LMS

WMPS (1210 AM) is a commercial radio station licensed to Bartlett, Tennessee, United States, and serving the Memphis metropolitan area. Owned by Flinn Broadcasting, it airs an adult standards and soft oldies format branded "Sunny 1210 & 103.1". WMPS's studios are on Mount Moriah Road Extension at Ridgeway Road in Memphis, and the transmitter is on Rockyford Road at Walker Farms in Bartlett.

The station also simulcasts over FM translator W276BH (103.1 FM) in Memphis and streams online.

== History ==
The station signed on the air on August 19, 1986, as WGSF, licensed to Arlington, Tennessee. WGSF was owned by the Arlington Broadcasting Company. In the 1980s, Fred Flinn became the general manager of the station and would later acquire the station as part of his Flinn Broadcasting Corporation. In the late 1980s, WGSF's city of license was switched to Bartlett, Tennessee, and its call letters changed to WMPS.

WMPS originally carried the "Music of Your Life" syndicated adult standards format, later switching to adult contemporary music. Under Flinn Broadcasting ownership, the station returned to a standards format mixed with soft oldies, primarily from the 1950s, 60s, and 70s, programmed in-house.

Logo when simulcasting on KHGA

== FM translator ==
Broadcast translator for WMPS
Call sign	Frequency	City of license	FID	ERP (W)	HAAT	Class	FCC info
W276BH	103.1 FM	Memphis, Tennessee	149184	250	0 m (0 ft)	D	LMS
