= WRVR =

Coordinates: 35.155°N 89.822°W

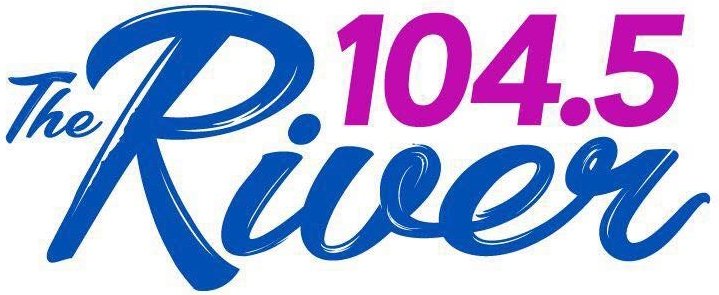
- Memphis, Tennessee; United States
- Broadcast area: Memphis, Tennessee
- Frequency: 104.5 MHz (HD Radio)
- Branding: 104.5 The River

Programming
- Language: English
- Format: Adult contemporary

Ownership
- Owner: Audacy, Inc.; (Audacy License, LLC)
- Sister stations: WLFP; WMC; WMFS; WMFS-FM

History
- First air date: 1968; 58 years ago
- Former call signs: WTCV (1968–1971); WAID (1971–1975); WQUD (1975–1981)
- Call sign meaning: The Mississippi River

Technical information
- Licensing authority: FCC
- Facility ID: 34375
- Class: C1
- ERP: 100,000 watts
- HAAT: 229 meters (751 ft)

Links
- Public license information: Public file; LMS
- Webcast: Listen live (via Audacy)
- Website: www.audacy.com/1045theriver

WRVR (104.5 FM, branded "The River 104.5") is an adult contemporary radio station broadcasting in Memphis, Tennessee. It has broadcast this format for at least 34 years as of 2021. Owned by Audacy, Inc., the station's studios are located in Southeast Memphis, and its transmitter is in Cordova, Tennessee, outside Memphis.

WRVR broadcasts in the HD Radio format.

The station plays pop and soft rock music from the 1970s to the present. 1960s music is occasionally played, and every year from mid-November to December 25, WRVR plays varieties of Christmas music, temporarily replacing its AC format.

== History ==
The 104.5 frequency originally aired religious-oriented programs with the call letters WTCV; later, it carried an easy-listening format with the call letters WAID. On April 23, 1975, it switched formats to MOR with the call letters WQUD and was branded "Quad 104." It was also the sister station at the time of WDIA (which is where the former WAID call letters—in reverse—came from).
