= WENO =

Radio station in Nashville, Tennessee

- Nashville, Tennessee; United States
- Broadcast area: Nashville metropolitan area
- Frequency: 760 kHz
- Branding: AM 760 & AM 730 The Flame

Programming
- Format: Conservative Talk
- Affiliations: Townhall News; Red Apple Media

Ownership
- Owner: Disruptor Radio, LLC

History
- First air date: Sept. 16, 1957 (at 1430 AM in Madison); May 23, 1988 (at 760 AM in Nashville)
- Former call signs: WJRR (1987–1988)

Technical information
- Licensing authority: FCC
- Facility ID: 71507
- Class: D
- Power: 1,000 watts days only
- Transmitter coordinates: 36°8′28.00″N 86°45′23.00″W
- Repeater: 730 KQPN West Memphis, Arkansas

Links
- Public license information: Public file; LMS
- Webcast: Listen Live
- Website: newstalk760.com

WENO (760 AM) is a commercial radio station in Nashville, Tennessee. It is owned and operated by Disruptor Radio, LLC, and is branded as "AM 760 & AM 730 The Flame". It simulcasts a conservative talk radio format with co-owned KQPN West Memphis, Arkansas.

WENO is a daytimer station. During daylight hours, it broadcasts at 1,000 watts non-directional. Because 760 AM is a clear channel frequency reserved for Class A WJR Detroit, WENO must go off the air at night to avoid interference. The transmitter is off Dunning Drive in Nashville.

== History ==
=== WENO on 1430 AM ===
The historic WENO broadcast on 1430 kHz, currently assigned to WYGI. That station signed on the air on September 16, 1957. The 1430 frequency was powered at 5,000 watts fulltime. It was the only Nashville-area station in the early post-World War II era to program country music as its major format, even before long-time powerhouse 650 WSM went all-country. The country format remained on WENO from its inception until the 1970s, although country music was sometimes limited to the nighttime hours.

After the 1950s, when network programming largely migrated to television, the bulk of WSM's programming actually consisted of popular middle of the road (MOR) music, later adult contemporary music. WSM's owners judged pop music to be more attractive to advertisers. WSM did not adopt country full-time (except for a morning drive-time show) until about 1979.

The unwillingness of most broadcasters in the Nashville market to allow country music prominent airplay meant that WENO, by default, became very influential in the country music industry in the 1950s and 1960s. As the main country music station in what had become the recording capital of the genre, it provided recording executives with immediate input as to what country audiences, at least those in the Nashville area, desired. In effect, it acted as a test market for country records. Disc jockey Bob Jennings, a one-time WLAC employee, was among the most influential on-air personalities at the station during this period.

WENO was licensed to the Nashville suburb of Madison, Tennessee, then on the edge of a rural area. The station's five-acre (two-hectare) campus was promoted to listeners on air as the "WENO Radio Ranch". WENO began to decline as other, more-powerful stations switched to a country format, and as AM listeners in general, especially among the young, affluent consumers coveted by advertisers, switched increasingly to the FM band. By the 1980s, the station had gone silent. (The WENO call sign was used for a period by an urban gospel music station in Chattahoochee, Florida, prior to being returned to Nashville for its current usage.)

=== WENO on 750 AM ===
WENO on the 750 AM frequency in Nashville first signed on the air on May 23, 1988. It initially aired a soft Christian music format in AM stereo with some Christian talk and teaching shows. It was owned by the Radio Corporation of Nashville. News updates were supplied by CNN Radio.

At 6:00 a.m. on Monday, November 6, 2023, WENO switched to a conservative talk format and began broadcasting under new ownership, Disruptor Radio, LLC. It began using the slogan 'Nashville's Blow Torch! WENO-AM News Talk 760 The Flame!'

== See also ==
- List of Nashville media
