= WMFS-FM =

ESPN Radio affiliate in Bartlett, Tennessee, United States

- Bartlett, Tennessee; United States
- Broadcast area: Memphis, Tennessee
- Frequency: 92.9 MHz (HD Radio)
- Branding: ESPN 92-9

Programming
- Language: English
- Format: Sports radio
- Subchannels: HD2: ESPN Radio
- Affiliations: ESPN Radio; Compass Media Networks; Memphis Grizzlies Radio Network

Ownership
- Owner: Audacy, Inc.; (Audacy License, LLC)
- Sister stations: WLFP; WMC; WMFS; WRVR

History
- First air date: 1994; 32 years ago
- Former call signs: WJWL (1992–94); WRRW (1994–95); WMFS (1995–2009)
- Call sign meaning: "Memphis"

Technical information
- Licensing authority: FCC
- Facility ID: 4653
- Class: A
- ERP: 6,000 watts (horizontal); 5,800 watts (vertical)
- HAAT: 100 meters (330 ft)
- Transmitter coordinates: 35.172°N 89.945°W
- Repeater: 680 WMFS (Memphis)

Links
- Public license information: Public file; LMS
- Webcast: Listen live (via Audacy)
- Website: www.audacy.com/929espn

WMFS-FM (92.9 MHz) is a United States commercial sports radio station in Bartlett, Tennessee, broadcasting to the Memphis, Tennessee area, owned by Audacy, Inc. WMFS is the radio home for the Memphis Grizzlies. The station's studios are in Southeast Memphis, and the transmitter tower is in Northeast Memphis.

WMFS-FM broadcasts in the HD Radio format.

== History ==
=== Rock (1995–2001) ===
The station launched in 1995 by fledgling Belz Broadcasting with a mainstream rock format under the "Solid Rock 92.9 MFS!" slogan. The first song played was "Rock You Like a Hurricane" by the Scorpions.

The original on-air line-up in 1995 consisted of Dave Robins in the mornings, Jim Fox middays, Zak in the afternoon drive, Leslie in the evenings, and Tony Vazlini (a.k.a. Vasolini, Mark Cantoni) on overnights. Greg Murray replaced Jim Fox during the middays and was also Production Manager. The station later featured the syndicated The Howard Stern Show in morning drive.

=== Alternative (2001-2009) ===
WMFS was acquired by Infinity Broadcasting and on August 31, 2001 rebranded as "93X, the New Rock Alternative." The music shifted to alternative rock and was similar in sound to sister station KROQ-FM.

It remained an affiliate of Howard Stern until his departure to satellite radio in December 2005. The station then aired the syndicated Rover's Morning Glory. Other DJs included Paul Marshall, Sydney, Crate, Beck, Shay, Azi, Ditch, Twitch and Killabrew.

The station was purchased by Entercom Communications in 2006. WMFS was one of six radio properties in the Memphis market held by Entercom; the others were WMC-FM, WRVR-FM, WMFS, WLFP, and WMC.

=== Sports (2009–present) ===
On May 21, 2009, WMFS-FM changed its format to sports, simulcasting WMFS 680 AM. The station initially aired mostly national programming from ESPN Radio but over time has added more local shows.

Beginning in the 2011–12 station, WMFS became the flagship station for the NBA's Memphis Grizzlies.
