= WEGR =

- Arlington, Tennessee; United States
- Broadcast area: Memphis metropolitan area
- Frequency: 102.7 MHz (HD Radio)
- Branding: 102.7 Kiss FM

Programming
- Format: CHR
- Subchannels: HD2: Talk radio (WREC)
- Affiliations: Premiere Networks

Ownership
- Owner: iHeartMedia, Inc.; (iHM Licenses, LLC)
- Sister stations: KJMS, KWNW, WDIA, WHAL-FM, WHRK, WREC

History
- First air date: March 1967
- Former call signs: WREC-FM (1967–1975); WZXR (1975–1986)

Technical information
- Licensing authority: FCC
- Facility ID: 58397
- Class: C1
- ERP: 100,000 watts
- HAAT: 287 meters (942 ft)
- Transmitter coordinates: 35.275917°N 89.777306°W

Links
- Public license information: Public file; LMS
- Webcast: Listen live (via iHeartRadio)
- Website: 1027kissfm.iheart.com

WEGR (102.7 FM) is a commercial radio station licensed to Arlington, Tennessee, United States, and serving the Memphis metropolitan area, including sections of Tennessee, Arkansas, Missouri and Mississippi. WEGR airs a contemporary hit radio format and calls itself "102.7 Kiss FM". It is owned by iHeartMedia with studios on Thousand Oaks Boulevard in Southeast Memphis.

WEGR's transmitter is on Brief Road in Brunswick, Tennessee. WEGR broadcasts in HD Radio; the HD2 subchannel simulcasts WREC.

== History ==
The station signed on the air in March 1967. The original call sign was WREC-FM and it mostly simulcast co-owned WREC 600 AM. In December 1975, the station went to an automated country music format with the call sign WZXR. On September 25, 1977, the station switched to AOR (album oriented rock). Except for a brief flirtation with Top 40 in 1985 and 1986, the station played some form of rock until 2023.

Known as "Rock 103", WEGR had been consistently programmed with a classic rock format for more than 40 years. Its mascot was a walrus, which saw numerous incarnations. For a brief period, the station was promoted as "The Eagle", in an attempt to create a brand from the call sign.

For many years, WEGR's studio was located at historic 203 Beale Street. It was moved in 2003 to a facility shared by other area iHeartMedia broadcast stations.

On May 3, 2023, at 5PM, WEGR swapped frequencies with sister station KWNW, becoming the new home of "Kiss FM", marking the end of rock on 102.7 after nearly 50 years. The swap was made due to the pending demise of WMC-FM. The first song on "Kiss FM" after the swap was "Can't Stop the Feeling" by Justin Timberlake.
