= KWNW =

- Crawfordsville, Arkansas; United States
- Broadcast area: Memphis, Tennessee
- Frequency: 101.9 MHz
- Branding: Rock 102

Programming
- Format: Classic rock
- Affiliations: Premiere Networks

Ownership
- Owner: iHeartMedia, Inc.; (iHM Licenses, LLC)
- Sister stations: KJMS; WDIA; WEGR; WHAL-FM; WHRK; WREC

History
- First air date: February 5, 1979
- Former call signs: KBTM-FM (1979–1982); KJBR (1982–1994; KIYS (1994–2010)
- Call sign meaning: "Radio Now" (previous branding and format)

Technical information
- Licensing authority: FCC
- Facility ID: 51855
- Class: C3
- ERP: 8,500 watts
- HAAT: 147 metres (482 feet)
- Transmitter coordinates: 35°8′0.3″N 90°5′38.3″W

Links
- Public license information: Public file; LMS
- Webcast: Listen live (via iHeartRadio)
- Website: rock102memphis.iheart.com

KWNW (101.9 FM) – branded as "Rock 102" – is a radio station licensed to serve Crawfordsville, Arkansas, owned by iHeartMedia, Inc. The station airs a classic rock format, and its studios are located in Southeast Memphis, while its transmitter is located off Bridgeport Road in Marion, Arkansas, near Harahan Bridge and the Arkansas-Tennessee border.

== History ==
The station was previously licensed in Jonesboro, Arkansas, and was a longtime adult contemporary station since KBTM. On April 28, 1988, after playing "'65 Love Affair" by Paul Davis, the station flipped from adult contemporary to Top 40 as "Superhits 102". A year later in 1989, the branding was changed to "Power 102".

The frequency was previously located in the Jonesboro market (where it had the call letters KIYS). The station relocated to Crawfordsville where it began to target the Memphis area on September 10, 2010. While located in Jonesboro, the station was Top 40 (CHR) as "Kiss FM", owned by Clear Channel Communications (now iHeartMedia) but operated by East Arkansas Broadcasters under a local marketing agreement (LMA). After the 101.9 frequency moved to Crawfordsville, East Arkansas Broadcasting acquired KRLW-FM, which had been at 106.3, moved the frequency over to 101.7 and relaunched the station as "101.7 Kiss FM". The new station signed on September 12, 2010, (after the 101.9 frequency signed off with a 2-day loop redirecting listeners to 101.7) and began serving the Jonesboro market. Clear Channel Communications then affixed the "Radio Now" moniker to 101.9.

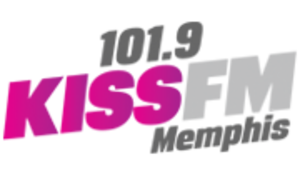
Previous logo

On March 7, 2014, at 5 pm, after faking a flip to country music, KWNW rebranded back to "101.9 Kiss FM", restoring the Kiss FM brand to the frequency for the first time since its days in Jonesboro. Radio Now signed off with "It's So Hard to Say Goodbye to Yesterday" by Boyz II Men, while the first song as the revived Kiss FM was "Kiss Kiss" by Chris Brown.

On May 3, 2023, KWNW's format changed from top 40/CHR to classic rock, branded as "Rock 102" (format moved from WEGR 102.7 FM Arlington, Tennessee).
