= WEBL (FM) =

Coordinates: 34.8515°N 90.0054°W

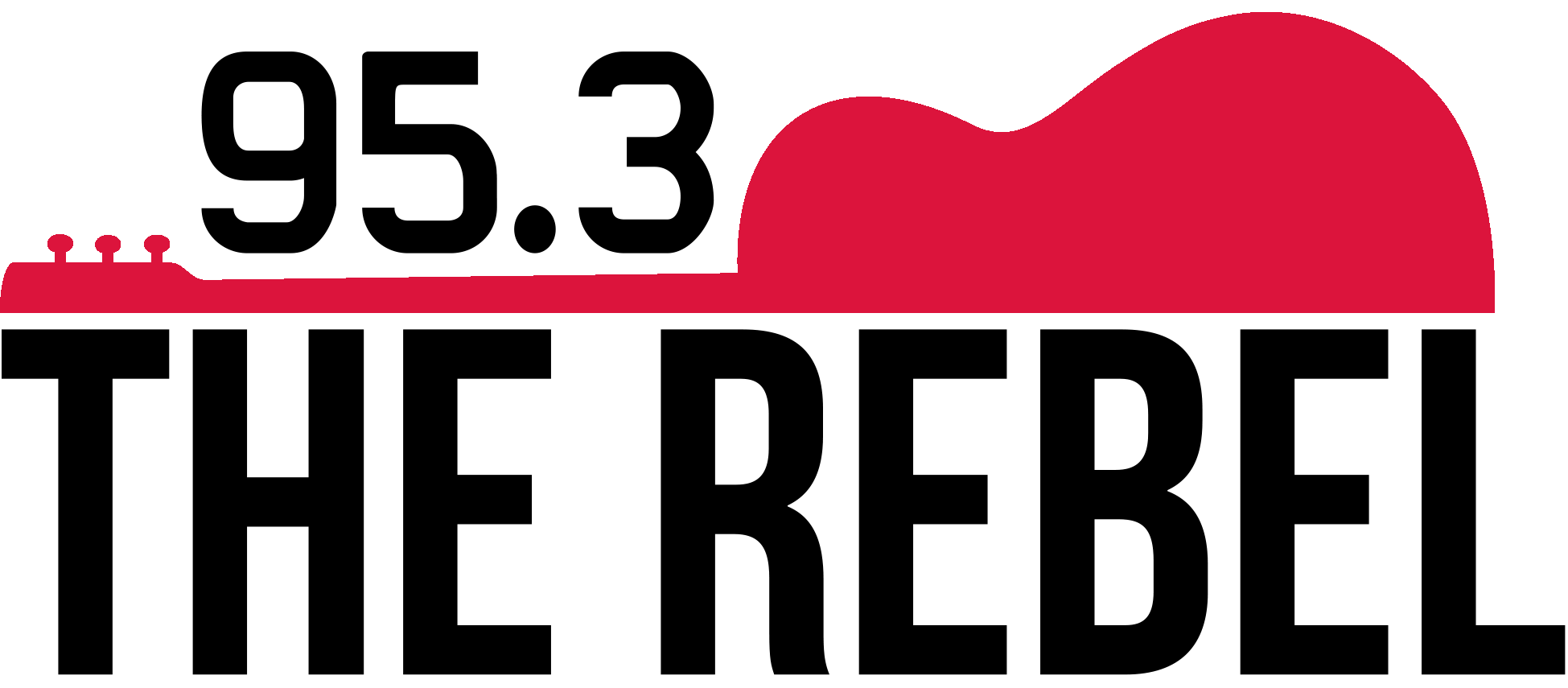
- Coldwater, Mississippi; United States
- Broadcast area: Memphis Metropolitan Area
- Frequency: 95.3 MHz (HD Radio)
- Branding: 95.3 The Rebel

Programming
- Format: Country

Ownership
- Owner: Tom and Allison Freeman; (North Mississippi Media Group, LLC.)

History
- First air date: 1976 (as WVIM-FM)
- Former call signs: WVIM-FM (1976–2013)

Technical information
- Licensing authority: FCC
- Facility ID: 16790
- Class: A
- ERP: 2,200 watts
- HAAT: 168 meters (551 ft)
- Translator: (100.1 MHz) W261CE (Southaven)

Links
- Public license information: Public file; LMS
- Webcast: Listen Live
- Website: mississippicountry.com

WEBL (95.3 FM, "95.3 The Rebel") is a country music station licensed to Coldwater, Mississippi, United States, and serves the Memphis, Tennessee, area.

== History ==
The station began broadcasting in 1976, holding the call sign WVIM-FM, and aired a Gospel music format. It was owned by Tate & DeSoto County Broadcasting. It later aired a Christian contemporary format and was branded "Victory 95.3". Spanish language music aired overnights.

In 2004, the station was sold to First Broadcasting Investment Partners for $2.1 million. It adopted an oldies format and was branded "Oldies 95.3". It was later branded "Flash 95-3". In early 2008, the station adopted a country format as "95.3 The Rebel". Its call sign was changed to WEBL on January 18, 2013. Effective September 20, 2018, WEBL was sold to North Mississippi Media Group for $900,000.
