= WREC =

- Memphis, Tennessee; United States
- Broadcast area: Memphis metropolitan area
- Frequency: 600 kHz
- Branding: Newstalk 92.1 FM and 600 AM

Programming
- Format: Conservative talk
- Affiliations: Fox News Radio; Compass Media Networks; Premiere Networks; Westwood One

Ownership
- Owner: iHeartMedia, Inc.; (iHM Licenses, LLC)
- Sister stations: KJMS, KWNW, WDIA, WEGR, WHAL-FM, WHRK

History
- First air date: November 22, 1922
- Former call signs: WOAN (1922–1930); WREC (1925–1930); WREC-WOAN (1930–1933)
- Call sign meaning: "Wooten Radio and Electric Company"

Technical information
- Licensing authority: FCC
- Facility ID: 58396
- Class: B
- Power: 5,000 watts
- Transmitter coordinates: 35°11′41″N 90°0′36″W
- Translator: 92.1 W221CR (Memphis)
- Repeater: 102.7 WEGR-HD2 (Arlington)

Links
- Public license information: Public file; LMS
- Webcast: Listen live (via iHeartRadio)
- Website: 600wrec.iheart.com

WREC (600 AM) is a commercial radio station licensed to Memphis, Tennessee, United States, and serves the Memphis metropolitan area. Owned by iHeartMedia, it features a conservative talk format, with studios and offices on Thousand Oaks Boulevard in Memphis. WREC is West Tennessee's primary entry point station for the Emergency Alert System.

WREC's transmitter is sited on North Watkins Street, near Interstate 40 in Memphis. Programming is simulcast over low-power FM translator W221CR on 92.1 MHz. The station is also heard on an HD radio digital subchannel of WEGR.

== History ==
=== WOAN ===
According to Federal Communications Commission (FCC) records, WREC's origin dates to station WOAN, which consolidated with WREC in 1930, making WREC the oldest radio station in Memphis, going on the air a year before WMC.

WOAN was first licensed on November 21, 1922, to "Vaughn Conservatory of Music (James D. Vaughn)" in Lawrenceburg, Tennessee, operating on the "entertainment" wavelength of 360 meters (833 kHz). Its callsign was randomly assigned from a sequential roster of available call signs.

=== WREC ===
WREC was first licensed on January 17, 1924, owned by electrical engineer and radio dealer Hoyt Wooten. The original call letters were also randomly assigned, from an alphabetical roster of available call signs starting with "K", which were normally only issued to stations located west of the Mississippi River. KFNG operated from a 10-watt transmitter in Wooten's father's home in Coldwater, Mississippi. (Some station histories report a start of broadcasting activities by Hoyt Wooten in September 1922.) In 1925, the station adopted its current WREC call letters, and later moved to Whitehaven, Tennessee, now a part of Memphis.

=== Consolidation of WREC and WOAN ===
WREC began sharing the 600 AM frequency with WOAN. In 1929 the two stations began joint operations, with WREC moving to studios in the basement of the Peabody Hotel in downtown Memphis, where it would remain for over 40 years. In 1930, the two stations were formally consolidated with the joint call sign of WREC-WOAN. On May 15, 1933, after the Federal Radio Commission requested that stations using only one of their assigned call letters drop those that were no longer in regular use, WOAN was eliminated and the station reverted to just WREC.

WREC was an affiliate of the CBS Radio Network. It carried CBS dramas, comedies, news, sports, soap operas, game shows and big band broadcasts during the "Golden Age of Radio."

In 1956 WREC added a TV station, CBS affiliate WREC-TV 3 (now WREG-TV), and in 1967, it put an FM station on the air at 102.7, WREC-FM (now WEGR). Wooten sold his stations to Cowles Communications in 1963, earning a handsome return on his original investment. As network programming moved from radio to television in the 1960s, WREC switched to a full service, middle of the road format of popular adult music, news and sports. In the 1980s, it began reducing music shows and replacing them with talk shows, until the transition to full time talk was complete in the 1990s.

In 1996, Clear Channel Communications acquired WREC and WEGR. Clear Channel changed its name to iHeartMedia in 2014.

== Programming ==
WREC's program schedule consists of nationally syndicated conservative talk shows from Premiere Networks In the fall of 2006, WREC assumed the broadcast rights for the Memphis Tigers football and basketball teams of the University of Memphis. Before carrying the Tigers, the station had long been the Memphis affiliate for Tennessee Volunteers football and basketball.
