= WLFP (FM) =

Country music radio station in Memphis

- Memphis, Tennessee; United States
- Broadcast area: Memphis metropolitan area
- Frequency: 99.7 MHz
- Branding: 99.7 The Wolf

Programming
- Language: English
- Format: Country

Ownership
- Owner: Audacy, Inc.; (Audacy License, LLC)
- Sister stations: WMC; WMFS; WMFS-FM; WRVR

History
- First air date: May 22, 1947; 79 years ago
- Former call signs: WMCF (1947–1960); WMC-FM (1960–2023)
- Call sign meaning: "Wolf"

Technical information
- Licensing authority: FCC
- Facility ID: 59449
- Class: C
- ERP: 300,000 watts (horizontal); 100,000 watts (vertical)
- HAAT: 277 meters (909 ft)
- Transmitter coordinates: 35°10′9″N 89°53′10″W

Links
- Public license information: Public file; LMS
- Webcast: Listen live (via Audacy)
- Website: www.audacy.com/997thewolf

WLFP (99.7 MHz, "99.7 The Wolf") is a commercial country music radio station licensed to Memphis, Tennessee, serving the Memphis metropolitan area and much of surrounding West Tennessee, northern Mississippi, and eastern Arkansas. The station is owned by Audacy, Inc. The WLFP studios are located in Memphis' Colonial Acres neighborhood, while the station transmitter resides in northeast Memphis. Besides a standard analog transmission, WLFP is also available online via Audacy.

Founded by The Commercial Appeal in 1947 as WMCF, and known from 1960 to 2023 as WMC-FM, WLFP is notable for being an FM "superpower station," with an output exceeding Federal Communications Commission (FCC) restrictions; of FM stations operating in the FCC's Zone II, WLFP is the most powerful.

== History ==
The Memphis Publishing Company, a subsidiary of Scripps-Howard Newspapers which owned the Memphis Commercial Appeal and founded WMC (790 AM), launched this station as WMCF on May 22, 1947. WMCF was the first FM station established in Memphis and the second in the state of Tennessee, after WSM-FM in Nashville, which began in 1941. From its establishment, WMCF had an output of 515,000 watts; this would be adjusted multiple times before settling at its current power output of 300,000 watts. As the FM adjunct to WMC, WMCF largely simulcast the AM station's programming.

On December 11, 1948, a TV station was added, WMCT. WMC, WMCF and WMCT moved to studios at 1960 Union Avenue in Midtown Memphis in 1959 and celebrated with a broadcast hosted by comedian George Gobel. WMCF changed its call sign to WMC-FM on May 27, 1960; WMCT would become WMC-TV in 1967.

WMC-FM was the first FM radio station in the market, and the first in Tennessee, to play progressive rock, beginning February 6, 1967. Personalities on the station included Greg Hamilton, Ron Michaels, Jon Scott, David Day, and the program director was Mike Powell. Artists included the likes of King Crimson, It's a Beautiful Day, and Quicksilver Messenger Service. The versions of "Light My Fire" by The Doors and "In-A-Gadda-Da-Vida" by Iron Butterfly (with its extended drum solo) were longer than the one most stations played. In the early 1970s, the station was responsible for regionally breaking many new artists such as David Bowie, Alice Cooper, Lynyrd Skynyrd, ZZ Top and Billy Joel. By 1978, WMC-FM had evolved to a Top 40/CHR format, which would transition to a hot adult contemporary format by September 1992.

Scripps Howard sold WMC, WMC-FM, and WMC-TV to Atlanta businessman Bert Ellis in 1993. Ellis, in turn, sold his station group in the spring quarter of 1996 to a new broadcasting group formed by the Retirement Systems of Alabama, also composed of Aflac's broadcast holdings and Ellis' Raycom Sports operations; this was subsequently named Raycom Media.

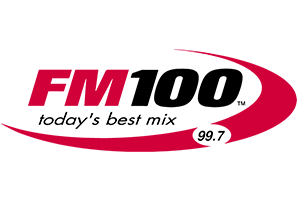
Final logo as "FM 100"

Raycom Media sold off WMC and WMC-FM in 2000 to Infinity Broadcasting, a subsidiary of CBS Radio, while keeping WMC-TV. In 2006, Entercom Communications purchased WMC and WMC-FM from CBS Radio; this preceded both companies merging a decade later. WMC and WMC-FM relocated to the Entercom complex in the Moriah Woods Business Park, near the intersection of I-240 and Mount Moriah Road in eastern Memphis.

Many of the station's air personalities worked there for a decade or longer. Most notably, Ron Olson had been the station's morning host since the 1980s, partnered with Steve Conley and Karen Perrin for some of that time, until leaving the station to join co-owned WRVR in January 2018. Tom Prestigiacomo had been the afternoon host since 1979, staying for nearly three decades; Prestigiacomo left in 2007 for rival AC outlet WKIM.

By 2023, WMC-FM's schedule included the morning team of Ryan Anderson and Erin Austin; Jill Bucco in middays; Chris Michaels in afternoons; Chase Daniels in evenings; and Bennett Doyle in overnights. WMC-FM also carried the "Acoustic Sunrise" program hosted by Matthew Reid on weekends.

In April 2023, as part of a memo to staff, Audacy disclosed that the country music programming of WLFP (94.1 FM) would relocate to WMC-FM as "99.7 The Wolf", replacing WMC-FM's hot adult contemporary format (which would continue as a stream exclusively on Audacy's online app), following the sale of the 94.1 license to the Educational Media Foundation. The move of "The Wolf" would take place at 12 p.m. on June 12, 2023, following a six-hour farewell program for "FM 100", in which a majority of the past and then-current airstaff voiced their stories about the station. The final song on "FM 100" was "Memphis, I'm Coming Home to You" by The Breaks (a longtime promotional song for the station penned in 1980 by station program director Gary Guthrie), while the first song on "99.7 The Wolf" was "Like I Love Country Music" by Chattanooga native Kane Brown; the first promotional sweeper under the "Wolf" format was a final tribute saluting the "FM 100" format. The WMC-FM call sign would be retired on June 20, when the call sign WLFP moved from 94.1 (which was renamed WMLE); due to a clerical error relating to the FCC database's treatment of stations with three-letter call signs, the initial application for the transfer specified co-owned WZMX in Hartford, Connecticut, as the recipient of the WLFP call sign.

=== Superpower status ===
Current FCC restrictions were passed in 1962 and mandate a maximum 100,000 watts across most of the country on the FM band, with most of the Northeast and much of California limited to 50,000 watts. WLFP is calculated to exceed power restrictions by 4.6 decibels. However, WLFP was grandfathered at the high power since it went on the air before the restrictions began.
