= WMLE =

- Germantown, Tennessee; United States
- Broadcast area: Memphis, Tennessee
- Frequency: 94.1 MHz
- Branding: K-LOVE

Programming
- Language: English
- Format: Christian adult contemporary

Ownership
- Owner: Educational Media Foundation
- Sister stations: WIVG

History
- First air date: 1978
- Former call signs: WGTG (1976–1977); WEEF (1977–1978); WLVS (1978–1983); WEZI (1983–1989); WODZ-FM (1989–1993); WOGY (1993); WOGY-FM (1993–2001); WMBZ (2001–2006); WSNA (2006–2008); WKQK (2008–2014); WLFP (2014–2023)
- Call sign meaning: "Memphis K-Love"

Technical information
- Licensing authority: FCC
- Facility ID: 2686
- Class: C2
- ERP: 50,000 watts
- HAAT: 144 meters (472 ft)
- Transmitter coordinates: 34.990°N 89.863°W

Links
- Public license information: Public file; LMS
- Website: klove.com

WMLE (94.1 FM) is a radio station broadcasting a Christian adult contemporary format. It is licensed to Germantown, Tennessee, and serves the Memphis area as its K-Love station. The station is owned by the Educational Media Foundation. WMLE used to broadcast in HD.

WMLE is a Class C2 FM station that transmits with an ERP of 50,000 watts from a tower just south of the Mississippi state line, near Olive Branch, Mississippi, and its studios are located in Southeast Memphis.

== History ==
=== Rock (1978–1979) ===
The station's original owner was Sam Phillips, who founded Memphis' Sun Records in the 1950s, and is credited with discovering Elvis Presley; its initial call sign, WLVS, was chosen in Presley's honor. WLVS offered a rock music format when it signed on in 1978 at 94.3 FM.

=== Country (1979–1983) ===
In 1979, the station flipped to a country music format.

=== Beautiful music (1983–1989) ===
It flipped to beautiful music as WEZI in 1983.

=== Oldies (1989–1993) ===
The station changed to an oldies format as WODZ-FM. By 1992, they would switch frequencies to 94.1.

=== Country (1993–2001) ===
In February 1993, they would go country as WOGY-FM with the branding of "Froggy 94," and would continue in that direction into the new millennium.

However, after Entercom bought the station in 2000, change was in the air at 94.1. While it was rumored that the station would flip from country by the holidays, the format remained into the new year.

=== Modern adult contemporary (2001–2006) ===
On January 24, 2001, at 10:05 a.m., "Froggy" signed off with "All the Good Ones Are Gone" by Pam Tillis, and 94.1 began stunting with the sound of a ticking clock. At 2:35 p.m., after a few delays (including a technical glitch that resulted in the "Froggy" format briefly returning for a brief stopset, only to revert back to the clock sound), they flipped to Modern AC as "94.1 The Buzz", with the call sign soon changed to WMBZ. The first song on "The Buzz" was "Even Flow" by Pearl Jam.

While at the outset the change did attract a lot of listener attention, the effect was not as long-lived as Entercom would hope. While The Buzz did manage to sound the death knell for then-WKSL and spark minor format tweaks at then-rival WMC-FM, overall it was not enough.

=== Rhythmic (2006–2008) ===
On October 27, 2006, at 5 p.m., the station began stunting with a robotic countdown (using Microsoft Sam) to 10 a.m. on the following Monday, October 30 (as well as airing occasional non-sequiturs in between numbers). At the time promised, 94.1 flipped to rhythmic AC as WSNA, "Snap! 94.1, The Rhythm Of Memphis", with the first song on "Snap!" being "Let's Get It Started" by The Black Eyed Peas.

=== Classic hits (2008–2014) ===
On October 17, 2008, at 2 p.m., after playing "Bye Bye Bye" by 'N Sync, WSNA flipped to classic hits as "Classic Hits 94.1 KQK". The station's call sign was changed to WKQK. The first song played on "94.1 KQK" was Bob Seger's "Old Time Rock and Roll." The station's playlist consisted of music from the 1960s, 1970s, and early 1980s. The new format's morning team would include long-time WMC-FM hosts Steve Conley and Karen Perrin.

=== Country (2014–2023) ===
On September 26, 2014, at 6 p.m., after playing "Last Dance" by Donna Summer, WKQK flipped back to country as "94.1 The Wolf". The first song on "The Wolf" was "This Is How We Roll" by Florida-Georgia Line. On October 3, WKQK changed its call sign to WLFP to go with the "Wolf" branding.

=== Sale to EMF ===
Audacy (the former Entercom) filed to sell WLFP, along with WTSS in Buffalo, New York, to the Educational Media Foundation (EMF) for $15.5 million in April 2023; the two stations, along with KQPS in Palm Desert, California, had been transferred into a subsidiary, Audacy Atlas, for assets designated for sale earlier in the year. EMF already owned K-Love station WKVF in Bartlett, with its Air1 network airing on Flinn Broadcasting-owned WIVG in Tunica, Mississippi, the HD2 channel of WKVF, and translator W244BY (96.7). Audacy subsequently disclosed in a memo to staff that WLFP and the "Wolf" country music programming would relocate to WMC-FM's larger 99.7 signal following the sale of 94.1; the move would occur at 12 p.m. on June 12, 2023.

The last song played on "94.1 The Wolf" before the move to 99.7 was "Bottoms Up" by Brantley Gilbert; at the promised time, the two stations began simulcasting as a means of transition for the "Wolf" format (similar to how Audacy would handle the handover of WTSS near-concurrently). EMF took control of the station on June 16, 2023, and the station was taken dark that day. On June 20, the station return to the air and changed its call sign to WMLE, with WLFP moving to 99.7. As WMLE, the station joined the K-Love network.
