= WHBQ (AM) =

Sports radio station in Memphis

- Memphis, Tennessee; United States
- Broadcast area: Memphis metropolitan area
- Frequency: 560 kHz
- Branding: Radio Pig 98.5

Programming
- Format: Classic hits

Ownership
- Owner: Flinn Broadcasting Corporation
- Sister stations: KXHT; WHBQ-FM; WMPS; WMSO; WOWW

History
- First air date: March 25, 1925; 101 years ago

Technical information
- Licensing authority: FCC
- Facility ID: 21727
- Class: B
- Power: 5,000 watts day; 1,000 watts night
- Transmitter coordinates: 35°15′12″N 90°2′51″W
- Translator: 98.5 W253DF (Memphis)

Links
- Public license information: Public file; LMS
- Webcast: Listen live
- Website: radiopig.com

WHBQ (560 kHz) – branded as Radio Pig 98.5 – is a commercial Classic hits AM radio station licensed to serve Memphis, Tennessee. Owned by Flinn Broadcasting, the station covers the Memphis metropolitan area. The WHBQ studios and transmitter are located in the city of Memphis. Besides a standard analog transmission, WHBQ is available online. The station is also simulcast over translator W253DF at 98.5 FM.

== History ==
On March 25, 1925, WHBQ first signed on the air. It was among the earliest stations in Memphis and had its studios in the historic Hotel Claridge. During the 1930s, it broadcast at 100 watts on 1370 kilocycles.

After the North American Regional Broadcasting Agreement (NARBA) went into effect in 1941, WHBQ switched to 1400 kHz, powered at 250 watts. WHBQ moved its studios to Hotel Gayoso. In the 1940s, WHBQ became a network affiliate of the Mutual Broadcasting System. At the end of the 1940s, WHBQ moved to its current spot on the dial, 560 kHz. It got a boost in power to 5,000 watts days and 1,000 watts nights.

General Teleradio (later RKO General), the broadcasting arm of the General Tire and Rubber Company, purchased the WHBQ stations in March 1954, and later turned the AM counterpart into a leading Top 40 station. Its reputation was developed by Dewey Phillips, a disc jockey who played rhythm and blues music on his night time show, "Red, Hot and Blue." In 1954, Phillips played a recording of "That's Alright Mama" by Elvis Presley, a young truck driver and budding musician, marking the first time an Elvis recording was broadcast on the radio.

For many years, WHBQ was considered a "farm team" for RKO's larger stations. Young, aspiring DJs, such as Rick Dees and game show host Wink Martindale worked there with hopes of being moved up to RKO's larger markets, like Boston, New York City, San Francisco, or the biggest Top 40 station in the chain, KHJ in Los Angeles. In the 1960s, under the guidance of programmer Bill Drake, WHBQ became Boss Radio, known for playing the hottest hits with the most popular DJs.

Disc jockey George Klein was indicted and convicted of mail fraud in 1977. Klein, a former Program Director for WHBQ, went to trial after being indicted on four counts of conspiring with a former postal employee to steal Arbitron diaries. Klein admitted to filling out diaries in order to inflate WHBQ's ratings. Klein was found guilty of conspiracy and sentenced to 60 days in federal prison.

By the early 1980s, the once-mighty Top 40 station could no longer compete with the increasing popularity of FM-band contemporary music stations. WHBQ tried playing oldies from 1981 to 1983 before switching to a full service talk radio format. It used local talk hosts as well as syndicated programming from NBC Talknet and ABC TalkRadio.

In 1988, RKO sold WHBQ to Flinn Broadcasting, a local media company. Flinn tried oldies again, then country music and even heavy metal late at night. In 1992, WHBQ switched to all sports. For a time it was affiliated with CBS Sports Radio, then NBC Sports Radio. When NBC discontinued full-time sports programming at the end of 2018, WHBQ switched to Fox Sports Radio.

In October 2020, WHBQ began simulcasting on FM translator W253DF (98.5 FM) in Memphis; its previous FM simulcast, WPGF-LP (87.7), dropped its simulcast with WHBQ and began stunting with Christmas music as "Santa @ 87.7". The arrangement lasted until the end of December 2020; in January 2021, it began running a rock format known as "Drake Hall Memphis Radio." WPGF-LP had until July 2021 to convert to digital and end its radio operations.

On November 2, 2026, WHBQ changed their format from sports (which continues on WHBQ-FM 107.5) to classic hits, branded as "Radio Pig".

== Previous Sports Programming ==
WHBQ serves as the Memphis area home for the University of Mississippi's Ole Miss Rebels football and men's basketball, and is also the main outlet for the Memphis Redbirds of baseball's International League.

The station's hosts include: Peter Edmiston, Anthony Sain, Dave Woloshin, Greg Gaston, Eli Savoie, Gabe Kuhn, Brett Norsworthy, and John Hardin. Nights and weekends, WHBQ carries programming from Fox Sports Radio.

Weekly programming includes:

- Mornings with Greg & Eli - Hosts: Greg Gaston and Eli Savoie - 7am - 10am

- Wolo & Friends - Host: Dave Woloshin - 10 am - 11am

- Happy Hour with Johnny Radio - Host: John Hardin - 11am - 1pm

- Sportstime with Gabe and Stats - Hosts: Gabe Kuhn and Brett Norsworthy - 3pm - 6pm

== Previous logo ==
(WHBQ's logo under previous simulcast with WPGF-LP)
