= WATN-TV =

Television station in Memphis, Tennessee

- Memphis, Tennessee; United States
- Channels: Digital: 25 (UHF); Virtual: 24
- Branding: ABC 24 Memphis; ABC 24 News Right Now

Programming
- Affiliations: 24.1: ABC; for others, see § Subchannels

Ownership
- Owner: Tegna Inc., a subsidiary of Nexstar Media Group; (Tegna Memphis Broadcasting, Inc.)
- Sister stations: WLMT; Nexstar: WREG-TV

History
- First air date: September 10, 1978
- Former call signs: WPTY-TV (1978–2013)
- Former channel numbers: Analog: 24 (UHF, 1978–2009)
- Former affiliations: Independent (1978–1990); Fox (1990–1995); The WB (secondary, 1999–2003)
- Call sign meaning: ABC for Tennessee

Technical information
- Licensing authority: FCC
- Facility ID: 11907
- ERP: 1,000 kW; 500 kW (STA)
- HAAT: 340 m (1,115 ft)
- Transmitter coordinates: 35°16′33″N 89°46′38″W

Links
- Public license information: Public file; LMS
- Website: www.localmemphis.com

WATN-TV (channel 24) is a television station in Memphis, Tennessee, United States, affiliated with ABC. It is owned by the Tegna subsidiary of Nexstar Media Group alongside CW station WLMT (channel 30); Nexstar also owns CBS affiliate WREG-TV (channel 3). WATN-TV and WLMT share studios at the Shelby Oaks Corporate Park on Shelby Oaks Drive in northeast Memphis and transmitter facilities near Brunswick, Tennessee.

Channel 24 in Memphis began broadcasting in September 1978 as WPTY-TV, the first independent station in the Memphis area. It was originally owned by Petry Television, an advertising sales representative for TV stations. Under the station's third owner, Chase Broadcasting, WPTY cemented its status as the leading independent over channel 30 by securing the rights to Memphis State University basketball and the Fox affiliation, which had both been on its competitor. Clear Channel Television purchased WPTY-TV in 1992 and then began programming WLMT in 1993.

In 1995, Fox acquired WHBQ-TV (channel 13), then the ABC affiliate. As a result, WPTY-TV became the ABC affiliate in Memphis and started a local news department, though it has met with little ratings success. Clear Channel spun off its television stations to Newport Television in 2007; when Newport liquidated, channels 24 and 30 were purchased by Nexstar Broadcasting. Nexstar initiated a comprehensive overhaul of the station, moving it to its present studios and changing the call sign to WATN-TV. When Nexstar merged with Tribune Media in 2019, the company kept the higher-rated WREG-TV and spun off WATN–WLMT to Tegna. Nexstar bought Tegna in 2026 and retained all three stations.

== History ==
The first proposal for a channel 24 television station in Memphis was made by Connecticut-based Gamma Television Corporation in 1965. Gamma president Al Hartigan promised a station focused on local events and news coverage. Two other applicants also sought channel 24 at this time: John McLendon and a consortium of Victor Muscat and Cliff Ford. The Muscat–Ford group was granted a construction permit by the Federal Communications Commission (FCC) in April 1968, having merged with McLendon's group and paid Gamma in exchange for its withdrawal. Muscat never built the station: he ultimately pled guilty in a legal case involving giving false and misleading information to the FCC, and when the FCC asked him to build the station after the trial concluded, he was unable to sell the permit in a timely manner and surrendered it to the commission.

=== As an independent station ===
Petry Television, a national advertising sales firm and representative to television stations nationally, applied through subsidiary Delta Television in 1977 for a construction permit to build channel 24. John Serrao, the operations director for Petry, noted that Memphis was the largest market lacking an independent station or a station on the ultra high frequency (UHF) band. The FCC granted the construction permit in December, and by June, construction was under way on studios at 2225 Union Avenue in Memphis.

WPTY-TV began broadcasting on September 10, 1978. In the weeks leading up to its launch, local dealers reported a surge of interest in UHF antennas to receive the new station. The schedule focused on counterprogramming the city's three network affiliates with alternative offerings. It also filled a void in sports coverage: syndicated Southeastern Conference basketball, which appeared on the station's schedule in its first year, had gone unaired in Memphis the year before. In addition, the station offered the live discussion program Memphis Forum.

WPTY was the only independent station in Memphis until April 18, 1983, when TVX Broadcast Group launched WMKW-TV on channel 30. With two independents in town, the stations engaged in competition among themselves, though WPTY led WMKW in the ratings. A year later, Petry sold the station to Robert H. Precht, a former producer of The Ed Sullivan Show, for $13 million; Precht also owned television stations in western Montana. Less than two years later, Precht sold WPTY-TV to Chase Broadcasting, owner of WTIC-TV in Hartford, Connecticut; the original sale price of $12.5 million was discounted to $11.2 million because of the state of some of channel 24's equipment.

=== Fox affiliation ===
In 1989, as part of a process of divesting its smaller-market stations, TVX Broadcast Group sold WMKW-TV to MT Communications, which renamed it WLMT. In the span of a year, channel 30 would lose its two main programming attractions to channel 24. First to go was Memphis State University basketball; WPTY-TV presented a proposal to the university that paid three times as much money per game.

The next year, the Fox affiliation came up for renewal, and WPTY-TV intensively lobbied the Fox network; it had stronger ratings than channel 30, drawing a 7.4 percent share of total-day ratings to WLMT's 4.1. On WLMT, some Fox shows had less than half the audience they did in other cities. Fox chose to move its affiliation to channel 24 effective July 1, 1990. Memphis was one of four markets, all in the South, where Fox moved its affiliation during 1990; of the other three, two (Little Rock, Arkansas, and Nashville) involved ex-TVX stations, with the Nashville station losing its Fox affiliation also owned by MT.

Chase Broadcasting announced in 1991 it would sell some or all of its properties in order to invest in new business ventures in Eastern Europe after the end of the Cold War, particularly successful cable television systems in Poland. Three months later, Chase announced the sale of WPTY-TV to Clear Channel Television for $21 million, with WPTY-TV becoming Clear Channel's sixth Fox affiliate and its largest-market station when the new owners took over on April 1. Clear Channel fended off a bid by WLMT for Tigers basketball when the rights came up for renewal in 1992; the next year, it assumed most of channel 30's operations under a local marketing agreement (LMA), allowing the once-rivals to pool resources and programming.

=== Affiliation switch to ABC ===
In May 1994, Fox announced a 12-station affiliation switch agreement with New World Communications in major markets; Fox was actively looking for upgrades from UHF stations like WPTY-TV to stations in the very high frequency (VHF) band. Memphis was not involved in the New World switches, but a rumor circulated and was quickly quashed that the Memphis NBC affiliate, WMC-TV, was seeking to move to Fox; its owner, Ellis Communications, owned four Fox stations, even though Clear Channel had become the second-largest group owner of Fox affiliates. However, in August, Fox made its move by purchasing local ABC affiliate WHBQ-TV (channel 13) from Communications Corporation of America, which had just taken over ownership.

Movement around the switch was initially slow because Fox needed to wait for FCC approval to purchase WHBQ-TV; the FCC at the time was considering petitions from NBC about whether Fox was a foreign-owned entity not allowed to own broadcast stations. As part of a series of attempts to prevent News Corporation, the parent company of Fox, from acquiring additional stations, NBC had filed a request to the FCC to reject a pending trade of Denver's KDVR for Fox-owned KDAF in Dallas, as well as the network's purchase of WFXT in Boston, on the grounds that the company was in violation of foreign ownership rules (which prohibited a foreign-owned company from maintaining more than a 25 percent interest in a U.S. television station). The Memphis deal had still not been filed with the FCC by January 1995, four months after being announced. Foreign ownership had been a sensitive issue for Fox even prior to the New World deal. In 1993, its attempt to acquire WGBS-TV in Philadelphia was derailed after an objection was filed on ownership grounds. In the wake of the objection, the FCC opened a foreign ownership review into Murdoch's existing station holdings; had it ruled negatively, a forced ownership change or license loss could have meant the end of the network.

On June 12, 1995, the FCC notified WHBQ-TV that the commission had approved its sale to Fox, which was officially announced the next month. By then, channel 13 had already notified ABC that it would disaffiliate from the network on December 1, and WPTY-TV was named as the new ABC affiliate.

To prepare for launching a news operation, Clear Channel purchased a building at 2701 Union Avenue Extended to be renovated to house WPTY–WLMT; this also allowed channel 30 to move in with channel 24. The affiliation switch and launch of local news programming took place December 1, 1995.

In 1999, WPTY-TV took on a secondary affiliation with The WB, airing its prime time programs in late night slots. The WB had no full-time affiliate in Memphis; a local cable channel, "TV Memphis", aired its programming until the WPTY-TV affiliation. WB programs moved to WLMT in 2003.

WPTY-TV and WLMT began digital broadcasting on May 1, 2002. WPTY-TV discontinued regular programming on its analog signal, over channel 24, on June 12, 2009, as part of the federally mandated transition from analog to digital television; it continued to broadcast on channel 25, using virtual channel 24.

Both stations were included in the sale of Clear Channel's television station portfolio to Newport Television, controlled by Providence Equity Partners, for $1.2 billion on April 20, 2007 (equivalent to $1.86 billion in 2025). The sale was made so Clear Channel could refocus around its radio, outdoor advertising and live event units. The sale received FCC approval on December 1, 2007; after settlement of a lawsuit filed by Clear Channel owners Thomas H. Lee Partners and Bain Capital against Providence to force the deal's completion, consummation took place on March 14, 2008.

=== WATN-TV: Nexstar and Tegna ownership ===
As part of a liquidation of Newport Television's assets, Nexstar Broadcasting Group purchased WPTY-TV and WLMT in a 12-station deal worth $285.5 million (equivalent to $400 million in 2025) on July 19, 2012. Nearly immediately, Nexstar announced that it would move the stations from their aging five-story building in midtown Memphis into a former MCI call center on the city's northeast side. The relocation, in addition to providing more up-to-date facilities for the stations, was done because the impending replacement of the adjacent Poplar Viaduct would create vibrations and noise making the building unsuitable for television production. As part of a major rebrand, WPTY-TV became WATN-TV after moving into the new studios.

In 2019, Nexstar acquired Tribune Media, owner of Memphis CBS affiliate WREG-TV. Nexstar opted to retain WREG-TV (as well as WJKT in Jackson, which had been associated with WATN–WLMT) and sold WATN-TV and WLMT to Tegna Inc. Tegna reintroduced the ABC 24 brand to the station on September 27, 2021, with a new logo.

Nexstar agreed to acquire Tegna on August 19, 2025, for $6.2 billion. The deal was completed on March 19, 2026, after the FCC's Media Bureau issued waivers for Nexstar to own three full-power station licenses in markets such as Memphis. A temporary restraining order issued one week later by the U.S. District Court for the Eastern District of California, later escalated to a preliminary injunction, has prevented Nexstar from integrating the stations.

== News operation ==
WPTY-TV had no plans for a newscast as late as July 1994, even though other Fox affiliates were starting local newscasts. To plot the station's expansion into news, Clear Channel hired Los Angeles market veteran and consultant Jeff Wald. While several of the station's assignment desk and production staff members were hired from other local stations, the news talent largely came from elsewhere, ranging from Kennewick, Washington, to Duluth, Minnesota. One exception was Brian Teigland, a weatherman cut by WREG-TV in a dispute over disability benefits.

News Watch 24 newscasts debuted on December 1, 1995, the same day the station switched to ABC. The newsroom initially offered local news at 5, 6, and 10 p.m. on channel 24, as well as a 9 p.m. newscast known as News Watch 30 on WLMT. The 9 p.m. newscast, anchored by two Black men (Robb Harleston and Ken Houston), was intended to feature increased coverage of the city's minority communities.

The station's news operation went on the air before it was ready. Equipment broke down or didn't work at all. A passel of reporters and anchors new to the city could not convince viewers they knew the city. Tension on the air was visible and continues to be visible at times.

— Tom Walter, TV critic, The Commercial Appeal

The debut of News Watch 24 was particularly rough, owing to the simultaneous move to a new building and a lack of time to rehearse the newscasts. Sound issues plagued the 5 and 6 p.m. newscasts; the opening to the 10 p.m. news played out three times in a row. On the 9 p.m. show, sports anchor Greg Gaston called the University of Memphis "Memphis University". Such errors continued to be noticeable on WPTY's newscasts for months. Less than two weeks after starting, the anchor lineup for the weeknight newscasts was changed, with original lead anchor Wendell Stacy demoted to weekends and replaced with Bill Lunn and Teigland moved to weeknight weather. Ratings were low, with the newscasts at 5 and 10 p.m. attracting just three percent of the available audience in the May 1996 sweeps. The original news director was fired less than a year after the first newscast aired.

Measured ratings improved substantially, to about 8 percent of the viewing audience, once Nielsen Media Research introduced meters for ratings purposes in 1997; the station's 10 p.m. news ratings were even stronger among younger viewers. However, the station's most successful newscast was its 9 p.m. news for WLMT, which held its own against WHBQ-TV's newscast at that hour and drew more viewers than WPTY at 10.

The news product was overhauled in 2003 under the brand Eyewitness News and with new news talent; four existing anchors were replaced with the duo of Cameron Harper and Dee Griffin, who were cited as "high-energy", and a new weather radar system was installed. In September 2006, WPTY began airing a local morning newscast, coinciding with a visit by Good Morning America to Beale Street. Ratings continued to sit firmly in fourth place during this period.

Under Nexstar, in 2013, the station rebranded as "Local 24" coinciding with the call sign change to WATN-TV and relocation to the Shelby Oaks studio. WATN began broadcasting newscasts in high definition upon the move, using a surplus news set that Nexstar shipped from KLRT-TV in Little Rock, Arkansas; WATN also replaced the syndicated Live with Kelly and Michael at 9 a.m. with a local lifestyle program, Local Memphis Live.

=== Notable former on-air staff ===
- Dayna Devon – weeknight anchor/reporter, 1997–1999

== Subchannels ==
WATN-TV's transmitter is located near Brunswick. The station's signal is multiplexed:

Subchannels of WATN-TV
| Subchannel | Res. | Short name | Programming |
|---|---|---|---|
| 24.1 | 720p | WATN-HD | ABC |
| 24.2 | 480i | QUEST | Quest |
| 24.3 | 480i | Cozi | Cozi TV |
| 24.4 | 480i | Crime | True Crime Network |
| 24.5 | 480i | Laff | Laff |
| 24.6 | 480i | NEST | The Nest |
| 24.7 | 480i | Comet | Comet |
| 24.8 | 480i | Charge | Charge! |

== See also ==
- WLMT
