= WGNT =

Television station in Portsmouth, Virginia

- Portsmouth–Norfolk, Virginia; United States
- City: Portsmouth, Virginia
- Channels: Digital: 20 (UHF); Virtual: 27
- Branding: The Spot – Norfolk 27

Programming
- Affiliations: 27.1: Independent; for others, see § Subchannels

Ownership
- Owner: E. W. Scripps Company; (Scripps Broadcasting Holdings LLC)
- Sister stations: WTKR

History
- First air date: October 1, 1961
- Former call signs: WYAH(-TV) (1961–1989)
- Former channel numbers: Analog: 27 (UHF, 1961–2009); Digital: 50 (UHF, 2002–2020)
- Former affiliations: Independent (1961–1995); UPN (1995–2006); The CW (2006–2024)
- Call sign meaning: "Great New Television"

Technical information
- Licensing authority: FCC
- Facility ID: 9762
- ERP: 570 kW
- HAAT: 375 m (1,230 ft)
- Transmitter coordinates: 36°48′31.8″N 76°30′11.3″W

Links
- Public license information: Public file; LMS
- Website: www.thespottv.com/norfolk-27

WGNT (channel 27), branded as The Spot – Norfolk 27, is an independent television station licensed to Portsmouth, Virginia, United States, serving the Hampton Roads area. It is owned by the E. W. Scripps Company alongside Norfolk-licensed CBS affiliate WTKR (channel 3). The two stations share studios on Boush Street in downtown Norfolk; WGNT's transmitter is located in Suffolk, Virginia.

== Channel 27 in the 1950s: WTOV-TV ==
WGNT, originally WYAH-TV, was preceded on channel 27 by an earlier station, WTOV-TV (unrelated to the current WTOV-TV in Steubenville, Ohio), the second built in Norfolk proper and the market's third. It operated twice during the 1950s: from December 6, 1953, to October 3, 1954, and again under different ownership from May 25, 1955, to August 1959. It merged into WVEC-TV when that station moved from channel 15 to very high frequency (VHF) channel 13.

=== Establishment ===
After the Federal Communications Commission (FCC) ended its four-year freeze on television station license grants and opened the UHF band to television use in 1952, channel 27 was assigned to Norfolk. Two radio stations—WLOW of Norfolk, owned by the Commonwealth Broadcasting Corporation, and WSAP of Portsmouth—applied for the UHF channel. However, WSAP was sold and immediately withdrew the application, leaving only the WLOW application to be granted. A construction permit was awarded on July 16, and the call letters WTOV-TV were taken on July 31. Commonwealth purchased a tower used by WSAP's former FM station on Spratley Street in Portsmouth; set up temporary studios at its radio facility at 21st and Manteo streets; and negotiated a primary affiliation for the station with ABC. The DuMont Television Network was added as well before launch.

Test pattern broadcasts began in late October 1953; a building across the street from the radio studios was leased to provide a permanent home for the TV station. Official commercial programs began December 6, making WTOV-TV the third television station in the area behind WTAR-TV, the only pre-freeze station in the area, and WVEC-TV (channel 15), a UHF outlet in Hampton that had begun in 1953. The station went off the air on October 3, 1954, having failed to secure sufficient support to continue operating while it fought for the Hampton Roads area to get a third VHF allotment. WVEC-TV then immediately moved in, using the facilities as its Norfolk auxiliary studio.

=== Second stint on air ===
Commonwealth Broadcasting Company then filed to sell the permit to Tim Brite, Inc., a company headed by Temus Brite, in February 1955. Brite returned it to the air on May 25 as an independent station without network programming from studios in Portsmouth.

The proposal to move a third VHF channel into Hampton Roads involved changing channel 13 at New Bern, North Carolina, to channel 12, then moving channel 13 to Princess Anne. This was originally rejected by the FCC in February 1955, but the FCC added the channel to the area in 1956—on the stipulation that it be open to all potential applicants, meaning WTOV-TV would face competition for the station.

Norfolk radio station WNOR purchased a half interest in WTOV-TV in May 1957 and announced its intention to apply to move to channel 13. An official application was filed in June; this was the second, after a similar petition from WVEC-TV. Both stations were denied authority to use the VHF channel immediately on a temporary basis. WVEC, WTOV, and two other groups had applied for the channel by October 1957, with only one of the other groups—Virginian Television—still in the running when comparative hearings were set on the three applications in June 1958. Virginian Television was associated with radio station WBOF at Virginia Beach.

One notable on-air personality at WTOV was only seen on camera once. He was the station's newsreader, and he was fired after his lone appearance because he was Black and irate White callers expressed their displeasure; he remarked, "I thought it would be good for all my folks and friends to see me rather than this dumb news sign up there. Vanity got the better of me." The newsreader, Max Robinson, went on to anchor ABC World News Tonight.

=== Merger into WVEC-TV; closure ===
A settlement agreement among WVEC, WTOV, and Virginian Television was agreed to in August 1958. This called for WVEC-TV's application to move to channel 13 to proceed, with WTOV and Virginian Television each receiving a 10 percent interest in the television station, and WVEC radio being spun out to not be part of the enlarged ownership group. However, WAVY-TV protested on economic grounds, believing a third VHF station in its market would hurt it, and it was not until April 1959 that the FCC granted an initial decision in its favor in the case. WTOV left the air in August 1959; WVEC-TV moved from channel 15 to channel 13 on November 13, 1959.

== History ==
=== Christian Broadcasting Network ownership ===
A 29-year-old minister from Portsmouth, M. G. "Pat" Robertson, then obtained an option to acquire the former WTOV-TV plant in Portsmouth. He purchased the facility even though he found it vandalized, deteriorating, and "a scene of utter desolation". In August 1960, his Christian Broadcasting Network (CBN) applied for a new construction permit to put channel 27 back in service, proposing the call letters WTFC-TV ("Television for Christ"). However, those call letters were not available—apparently being reserved by the FCC—so he instead selected WYAH-TV, from the first three letters of Yahweh.

The new WYAH-TV began broadcasting on October 1, 1961, airing for five hours a day on Sundays and three hours from Tuesday to Saturday. The station's early programming consisted of Christian teaching programs hosted by Robertson, other shows produced by local churches, and some syndicated televangelists' repeats of Sunday programs. The station almost went dark in 1963, and so it conducted a special telethon urging 700 people to donate $10 a month, continuing to hold such telethons every other month. A few years later, the locally produced daily talk program would be named for the telethons, The 700 Club.

Beginning in 1966, Jim and Tammy Faye Bakker hosted and produced a local children's program called Come On Over (later called Jim and Tammy). This consisted of puppet shows, skits, prayers, singalongs, games, stories and religious short films such as Davey and Goliath and JOT. The program was eventually seen in Canada, and achieved widespread syndication throughout the United States. Pat Robertson also appeared on-camera as well, as host of additional Bible-teaching programs. Weekends consisted of televangelists such as Oral Roberts, Kathryn Kuhlman, Jerry Falwell and Billy Graham, and local church services. WYAH-TV was one of the first Christian television stations in the United States and was a viewer-supported station with a commercial license, though it sold blocks of time to other ministries. By 1966, the station was somewhat financially solvent.

By September 1967, WYAH-TV was broadcasting in color, and began commercial operation part-time about an hour a day. Initial non-religious fare included low-budget films, travelogues, and local productions. In June 1970, channel 27 activated a new, more powerful transmitter that boosted its effective radiated power to 2.25 million watts. This not only gave it a coverage area comparable to Hampton Roads' Big Three stations, but also provided secondary coverage to the eastern fringe of the Richmond market. Robertson sent a newsletter to donors boasting that channel 27 was now the most powerful station in Virginia.

By 1973 the station had increased its on-air hours, signing on at 10 a.m. and its schedule of secular programming, which coincided with the end of the Jim and Tammy show, which initially moved from the 6 p.m. time slot to the noon time slot on March 12, 1973. A few months later the show moved to the 9 a.m. time slot in reruns for the summer. Jim and Tammy actually left at the end of March 1973, their show last airing on August 31, 1973 (reportedly, Pat Robertson had fired Jim Bakker from the station over philosophical differences, though Robertson stated they left on their own will due to plans to eventually relegate their show to Sundays); the Bakkers soon after moved on in May 1973 to co-found the Trinity Broadcasting Network with Paul Crouch before splitting up with him to begin The PTL Club in 1975. By September 1973, WYAH-TV was on the air 20 hours a day as more of a mainstream independent station, with an expanded lineup of syndicated shows and religious programming, including airings of The 700 Club two times a day; Sundays were still devoted entirely to religious programs. Also, in 1972, Pat Robertson stepped down from his role as general manager and hired one (who likely played a role in the Bakkers' departure) to grow the station and be responsible for day-to-day operation, while Robertson would concentrate on taking his 700 Club program national, which occurred in 1974.

The Hampton Roads area had become one of the smallest markets in the U.S. with a commercial independent station. But while WYAH-TV had evolved into a conventional independent station by this time, its programming policy was decidedly conservative, in keeping with Robertson's Baptist/charismatic religious views. For many years, it muted any dialogue containing profanity. In some cases, it opted to preempt whole episodes out of concern for their subject matter. For example, at least two episodes of Gilligan's Island never aired on the station, because of content centering (albeit in a comical fashion) around ghosts and vampires. However, channel 27 offered a wide variety of programming and was a stronger independent than many secular-owned independent stations at that time. Still, Hampton Roads viewers got other choices once cable arrived in the area in the late 1960s, as WTTG and WDCA from Washington, D.C. became available on cable systems as well.

With WYAH's growth and profitability, CBN began expanding to other markets. The ministry launched WHAE-TV (now WANF) in Atlanta in 1971; purchased KXTX-TV in Dallas in 1972; and signed on WXNE-TV (now WFXT) in Boston in 1977. These stations formed the Continental Broadcasting Network, a wholly owned subsidiary of CBN, with WYAH-TV as the flagship station. Locally, channel 27 faced competition for the first time in 1979 when WTVZ (channel 33) was signed on by TVX Broadcast Group. The new, locally owned independent purchased general-entertainment programming–much of which was passed over by CBN, having been deemed too racy for the ministry's liking. The impact was near-immediate as WTVZ equaled, then surpassed, WYAH (the station officially dropped the -TV suffix from its call sign in June 1983) in viewership.

By the late 1980s, Continental Broadcasting had become too profitable to remain under the CBN banner without endangering CBN's non-profit status. With this in mind, Robertson began selling off his over-the-air stations and eventually sold off his directly owned cable network, the CBN Family Channel (the latter going to his son Tim's company, International Family Entertainment). In 1986, CBN announced plans to sell WYAH and KXTX to Family Group Broadcasting, which had agreed to retain the same personnel and programming, though the deal ultimately fell through.

=== Centennial ownership, UPN affiliation, Viacom ownership, and Local TV/Dreamcatcher Broadcasting ownerships ===
After the Family Group deal fell through, in August 1987, a group of local buyers scouted the station for a potential purchase. Major scandals in televangelism at the time had hit CBN hard with a decline in donations; earlier that year, it had laid off 500 employees in Virginia Beach. A $12 million deal was initially reached in 1988 with Draper Communications of Delaware, but no deal was ever closed. Instead, the local investors under the aegis of Centennial Communications agreed in March 1989 to acquire WYAH. They included Raymond Bottom Jr., former editor of the Daily Press in Newport News, with a 72 percent stake; Ernest Harris, a former vice president of WVEC-TV; Robert L. Freeman, a local accountant; and W. Howard Jernigan, former general sales manager of WGH-AM-FM.

After the FCC approved the sale in July, Centennial changed the call letters to WGNT ("Great New Television") on September 17 to fulfill a stipulation imposed by CBN in the transaction. After Centennial took control, WGNT initially ran shows inherited from the CBN days, but ended the station's decades-long practice of censoring the small amount of profanity from off-network syndicated programming. As the 1990s began, Centennial began mixing in more modern programming, such as talk shows like The Rush Limbaugh Show, Ricki Lake and Jerry Springer and the Prime Time Entertainment Network programming service. In 1991, it dropped the 11 p.m. repeat of The 700 Club. By 2003, the series was completely dropped from WGNT's schedule, removing the last link to its CBN days. However, it has aired on numerous outlets in the area in the years since then, and following a brief period in late 2016 when The 700 Club returned to WGNT after WTKR launched a local lifestyle program called Coast Live, the show began its second stint on WVBT.

On January 16, 1995, WGNT became a charter affiliate of the United Paramount Network (UPN) and branded itself as "UPN 27". In 1997, Paramount Stations Group bought WGNT for $42.5 million, making it a UPN owned-and-operated station. This made WGNT the only network-owned station in the Hampton Roads market. Viacom, Paramount's owner, later bought CBS as well. When Viacom split into two separate companies in December 2005 with its broadcasting properties remaining with the original Viacom, which was restructured as CBS Corporation, WGNT and the other UPN O&Os became part of the new company through its CBS Television Stations subsidiary.

On January 24, 2006, CBS and Time Warner announced that UPN and The WB would shut down to form a new jointly-owned service featuring series from both networks as well as newer series, The CW Television Network. As part of the announcement, the new network signed a 10-year affiliation deal with 11 of CBS' UPN stations, including WGNT. Channel 27 rebranded itself as "CW 27" in the summer of 2006 and officially became the Hampton Roads area's CW affiliate on September 18, 2006. On June 14, 2010, Local TV LLC, owner of CBS affiliate WTKR, acquired WGNT. Shortly after the announcement, Local TV took over WGNT's operations through a local marketing agreement as the company's first CW station, making it a sister station to WTKR (eventually creating the first legal duopoly in the Hampton Roads market once the purchase was finalized).

On July 1, 2013, Local TV announced it was merging with Tribune Company in a $2.75 billion deal. At the time, Tribune owned The Daily Press in Newport News. Due to FCC regulations barring newspaper-television cross ownership within a single market (although Tribune maintained cross-ownership waivers for its newspaper-television station combinations in four other media markets), Tribune spun off WTKR and WGNT, along with WNEP-TV in Scranton–Wilkes-Barre, Pennsylvania, to Dreamcatcher Broadcasting, an unrelated company owned by former Tribune Company executive Ed Wilson. Tribune provided services to the stations through a shared services agreement, and held an option to buy back WTKR and WGNT outright in the future. Tribune later announced on July 10, 2013, that it would spin off its newspaper division (including the Daily Press) into a separate company, the Tribune Publishing Company, in 2014, pending shareholder and regulatory approval. The sale was completed on December 27.

=== Aborted sale to Sinclair; sale to Nexstar and resale to Scripps ===
Sinclair Broadcast Group entered into an agreement to acquire Tribune Media in 2017. Sinclair would have had to select one of WGNT or WTVZ-TV to keep alongside WTKR; no divestiture plan was announced. However, the transaction was designated in July 2018 for hearing by an FCC administrative law judge, and Tribune moved to terminate the deal in August 2018.

In 2019, Nexstar Media Group, owner of WAVY-TV and Fox affiliate WVBT (channel 43), announced it would acquire Tribune. Nexstar opted to retain its existing stations and sold WTKR–WGNT to the E. W. Scripps Company. On April 19, 2024, Nexstar announced that The CW would not renew its affiliations with Scripps-owned stations, including WGNT; in the Norfolk market, the affiliation moved to WVBT-DT2 effective September 1.

== Newscasts ==
In 1995, WTKR began to produce the market's first prime time local newscast, a half-hour program at 10 p.m. called NewsChannel 3 at 10 on UPN 27. After Paramount Stations Group acquired WGNT in 1997, new management cancelled the newscast that December, citing a shift to an entertainment-focused programming direction.

The 10 p.m. time period was used for off-network repeats until June 29, 2015, when the weeknight primetime newscast returned under the name WGNT News at 10 - Powered by NewsChannel 3. This was WTKR's second attempt at a weeknight 10 p.m. newscast for WGNT.

In July 2011, WGNT management announced that local news programming would return to the station. The station debuted a two-hour morning newscast from 7 to 9 a.m., featuring the anchor team from sister station WTKR's morning program. Initially slated to launch on August 29, the newscast's debut was moved up to August 25 to provide coverage of Hurricane Irene. At some point afterwards, a half-hour 10 p.m. newscast began airing on weekends, followed by a half-hour program recapping stories sister station WTKR broadcast over the past week in their "Taking Action, Getting Results" franchise. Although the weeknight 10 p.m. newscast returned to WGNT on June 29, 2015, the weekend evening newscasts remained.

On July 7, 2014, WGNT debuted a half-hour 7 p.m. newscast featuring former morning anchor Laila Muhammad, Les Smith and chief meteorologist Patrick Rockey. It was the first newscast at that time slot in the Hampton Roads area.

== Technical information ==
=== Subchannels ===
The station's signal is multiplexed:

Subchannels of WGNT
Subchannel	Res.	Short name	Programming
27.1	1080i	WGNT-HD	Main WGNT programming
27.2	480i	Mystery	Ion Mystery (4:3)
27.3	480i	Grit	Grit
27.4	480i	Dabl	Dabl (4:3)
27.5	480i	QVC2	QVC2 (4:3)
27.6	480i	HSN2	HSN2 (4:3)

=== Analog-to-digital conversion ===
WGNT began digital broadcasts on channel 50 on July 15, 2002. The station ended regular programming on its analog signal, over UHF channel 27, on June 12, 2009, as part of the federally mandated transition from analog to digital television. The station's digital signal remained on its pre-transition UHF channel 50, using virtual channel 27. As part of the SAFER Act in the DTV Delay Act, WGNT was required to keep its analog signal on for one month to inform viewers of the digital television transition.

WGNT relocated its signal from channel 50 to channel 20 on January 17, 2020, as a result of the 2016 United States wireless spectrum auction.
