= WJKT =

Television station in Jackson, Tennessee

- Jackson, Tennessee; United States
- Channels: Digital: 21 (UHF); Virtual: 16
- Branding: Fox 16

Programming
- Affiliations: 16.1: Fox; for others, see § Subchannels

Ownership
- Owner: Nexstar Media Group; (Nexstar Media Inc.)

History
- First air date: April 18, 1985
- Former call signs: WJWT (1985–1990); WMTU (1990–2001)
- Former channel numbers: Analog: 16 (UHF, 1985–2009); Digital: 39 (UHF, 2005–2018)
- Former affiliations: Independent (1985–1986, 1992–1995); UPN (1995–2006)
- Call sign meaning: Jackson, Tennessee

Technical information
- Licensing authority: FCC
- Facility ID: 68519
- ERP: 193 kW
- HAAT: 319 m (1,047 ft)
- Transmitter coordinates: 35°47′27.1″N 89°5′58.2″W

Links
- Public license information: Public file; LMS

WJKT (channel 16) is a television station in Jackson, Tennessee, United States, affiliated with the Fox network and owned by Nexstar Media Group. Its advertising sales office is located on Oil Well Road in Jackson, and its transmitter is located in Alamo, Tennessee.

Channel 16 went on the air in April 1985 as WJWT, the first independent station in Jackson. It became a Fox affiliate in 1986. MT Communications, owner of then-Fox affiliate WLMT in Memphis, acquired the station at the end of 1989 and changed its call letters to WMTU in January 1990. Even though it lost the Fox affiliation for the Memphis market, WMTU continued to air Fox programming in the Jackson area until being turned into a full-time satellite station in 1992. Along with WLMT, it became an affiliate of UPN in 1995. The call letters were changed to WJKT in 2001, coinciding with the return of local advertising and an attempt to build a separate identity for the station.

Upon the merger of UPN and The WB into The CW in 2006, WJKT instead became a Fox affiliate again. It remained linked to WLMT through the simulcast of its local news programming and was sold along with WLMT and Memphis sister station WPTY-TV (now WATN-TV) twice. In 2019, Nexstar acquired Tribune Media and opted to divest WATN–WLMT in favor of WREG-TV in Memphis. WJKT shares management with WREG-TV and simulcasts some of its local newscasts.

== History ==
=== WJWT ===
In March 1980, Golden Circle Broadcasting, mostly owned by a Chattanooga company, filed an application with the Federal Communications Commission (FCC) to build a new television station on channel 16 in Jackson. Golden Circle intended to program the station as an independent outlet with family-friendly secular shows. A construction permit was granted in November 1981; little activity occurred on the permit until the end of 1983, when Golden Circle announced that construction on the proposed station, bearing the call sign WUAA, would begin in January 1984.

In late 1984, the call letters on the permit were changed to WJWT (We're Jackson, West Tennessee). Programming including classic reruns and movies as well as St. Louis Cardinals baseball was secured, as was studio space in a former Southern Supply Company building on Royal Street. WJWT began broadcasting on April 18, 1985, and spent most of its early months on air fighting the local cable system for carriage in a timely manner. The system had been holding off to ensure that customers without new converter equipment could continue to receive HBO, a channel whose space was needed for the new local station. In 1986, WJWT became a Fox affiliate at the network's launch. By 1988, it was owned by Lloyd Communications of Rockford, Illinois, and broadcast two local talk shows and weekday local newscasts.

=== WMTU ===
Golden Circle entered into financial problems in 1988, and an application was filed by a group of investors—Jackson Investment Corporation—in February 1989 to buy the station. The investors were associated with Memphis independent station WMKW-TV (channel 30), then the Fox affiliate in that city; the application was objected to by its primary competitor there, WPTY-TV, believing that the acquisition of the Jackson station would present an unfair advantage. Meanwhile, First American National Bank foreclosed on the station and moved to sell its assets in a courthouse auction. No such sale occurred. However, channel 30—having been renamed WLMT by new owners MT Communications that year—bought the license from Golden Circle and the assets from First American National Bank in December. The Jackson station began rebroadcasting almost all of WLMT's programming from new local offices that December. The only deviation at the time of the changeover consisted of two afternoon children's shows that only aired in Jackson. In January 1990, the station changed its call sign to WMTU, becoming the fourth MT Communications station to have a designation reflecting the company's owner, Michael Thompson.

On July 1, 1990, Fox moved its Memphis affiliation from WLMT to WPTY. However, WMTU continued to hold the Fox affiliation in the Jackson market, breaking away from channel 30 to air the network's programs. This continued until March 1992, when the local operation in Jackson was closed: local commercials no longer aired on WMTU, and five jobs were eliminated. That move came as three of the four MT stations—WMTU, WLMT, and WEMT in Greeneville—were being sold to former Virginia lieutenant governor Dick Davis. Max Media—a Virginia company founded by three former officers of TVX Broadcast Group, which had put the then-WMKW-TV on the air in 1983—then would manage the stations for Davis. Max Media's involvement with WLMT–WMTU was comparatively brief, as in 1993, the two stations were leased to Clear Channel Communications, which owned WPTY-TV. WLMT–WMTU joined UPN at its launch in January 1995. That December, WPTY-TV became the ABC affiliate in the Memphis area.

=== WJKT ===
On September 17, 2001, WMTU adopted the new call sign of WJKT as Clear Channel began to give the station a separate identity for the first time in nearly a decade, building off the fact that it owned three radio stations in the Jackson market. It partnered with local cable program producer TotalReach Television to sell advertising for WJKT in Jackson and to produce local programming for the station. In 2003, WJKT began simulcasting WLMT's 9 p.m. Memphis newscast.

In 2006, UPN and The WB merged to form The CW, of which WLMT became an affiliate. However, the merger presented a different opportunity in Jackson, where WJKT returned to the Fox network that August for the first time since 1992. It displaced Memphis Fox affiliate WHBQ-TV on local cable systems; Clear Channel at the time announced its intention to begin producing a local Jackson newscast on the station within 12 to 18 months.

In 2007, Clear Channel spun off its television stations division to private equity firm Providence Equity Partners, forming Newport Television. Nexstar Broadcasting Group then purchased twelve of Newport's stations, including WPTY–WLMT in Memphis and WJKT, in 2012. The next year, WPTY-TV was renamed WATN-TV, and the Memphis operation moved to new facilities that also provided services to WJKT.

Nexstar acquired Tribune Media in 2019. While it retained WJKT, the purchase required Nexstar to choose between its existing Memphis holdings of WATN-TV and WLMT or Tribune-owned WREG-TV, the Memphis CBS affiliate. It chose the latter and spun off the other stations to Tegna Inc. As a result, Nexstar began using WREG-TV's resources to operate WJKT. The two stations share a general manager, and WJKT began airing WREG-TV's 5 and 10 p.m. newscasts.

== Subchannels ==
WJKT's transmitter is located in Alamo, Tennessee. The station's signal is multiplexed:

Subchannels of WJKT
Subchannel	Res.	Short name	Programming
16.1	720p	WJKT-DT	Fox
16.2	480i	Escape	Ion Mystery
16.3	480i	Laff	Laff
16.4	480i	Grit	Grit
