= WTVZ-TV =

Television station in Norfolk, Virginia

- Norfolk, Virginia; United States
- Channels: Digital: 33 (UHF); Virtual: 33
- Branding: MyTVZ

Programming
- Affiliations: 33.1: Independent with MyNetworkTV; for others, see § Subchannels

Ownership
- Owner: Sinclair Broadcast Group; (WTVZ Licensee, LLC)

History
- Founded: May 1978
- First air date: September 24, 1979
- Former call signs: WTVZ (1978–1982)
- Former channel numbers: Analog: 33 (UHF, 1979–2009); Digital: 38 (UHF, 2006–2009)
- Former affiliations: Independent (1979–1986); Fox (1986–1998); The WB (1998–2006)

Technical information
- Licensing authority: FCC
- Facility ID: 40759
- ERP: 590 kW
- HAAT: 360.5 m (1,183 ft)
- Transmitter coordinates: 36°48′31.8″N 76°30′11.3″W

Links
- Public license information: Public file; LMS
- Website: mytvz.com

WTVZ-TV (channel 33) is an independent television station licensed to Norfolk, Virginia, United States, serving the Hampton Roads area and having a secondary affiliation with MyNetworkTV. Owned by Sinclair Broadcast Group, the station maintains studios on Office Square Lane in Virginia Beach, and its transmitter is located in Suffolk, Virginia.

WTVZ signed on September 24, 1979, as the second independent station in the Hampton Roads area. It was owned by a consortium of local investors known as the Television Corporation of Virginia. The investors soon formed a station group: Television Corporation Stations, later TVX Broadcast Group, which was headquartered in Norfolk. WTVZ was immediately competitive in local ratings and battled with the more religiously oriented WYAH-TV throughout the 1980s. As with other TVX stations, it joined Fox at its launch in 1986.

TVX sold WTVZ to its general manager, Charles A. McFadden, in 1989; at the time, the company was selling smaller stations to reduce debt. McFadden's group, later known as Max Television, dallied with the possibility of producing a local newscast for the station throughout the early 1990s but never followed through. Sinclair acquired WTVZ in 1995; that year, Fox announced it would move its affiliation to WVBT (channel 43) in 1998 due to a business dispute with Sinclair. The station then joined The WB in 1998 and MyNetworkTV in 2006.

== History ==
=== TVX ownership ===
In 1976, the Television Corporation of Virginia was formed in response to what its backers perceived as the need for another television station in the Norfolk area. After reaching an agreement to share the tower of public television station WHRO-TV, the group applied to the Federal Communications Commission (FCC) and received a construction permit for WTVZ-TV in June 1978. Two FCC commissioners dissented from the award because some of the investors in TVX—including Martha Davis, wife of future Virginia lieutenant governor Dick Davis—had holdings in Norfolk AM and FM radio stations; Television Corporation successfully argued that the addition of a new UHF station, first minority ownership of a local TV station, and integration of ownership and management outweighed these concerns. It also pointed to the fact that other attempts at commercial UHF television in Hampton Roads had failed economically. The investors secured the services of John A. Trinder, general sales manager at CBS affiliate WTAR-TV, and Tim McDonald, who had last been programming Washington independent WTTG, to help run the new WTVZ; McDonald required six months of coaxing to be lured away from Washington. The station aimed to offer counterprogramming to the existing network affiliates, reach the children's market (which Trinder and McDonald felt was underserved), and provide facilities for local commercial production.

WTVZ-TV began broadcasting on September 24, 1979, featuring a general-entertainment mix including movies, sitcoms, cartoons, and sports. The new station quickly made an impact in the market, claiming nine percent total-day share within a year of going on the air and buoyed by the market's large young male population. Where the general manager of a local network affiliate had once declared to Trinder, "We will bury you", sitcom reruns helped the station rise to number two in the valuable early fringe hours opposite the network affiliates. It took seven months for WTVZ to turn a profit, quickly leaving behind the early days when, Trinder recalled, "we made payroll by going to the bank and trading auto titles for cash".

The investors sought to replicate WTVZ's success in other markets. The first expansion of what became TVX Broadcast Group came with the 1980 purchase of WGNN-TV, a small Christian station in Winston-Salem, North Carolina, which went on the air as WJTM-TV. WRLH-TV in Richmond launched in 1982, followed by two Tennessee stations: WMKW-TV in Memphis in 1983 and WCAY-TV in Nashville in 1984.

In 1986, as with the other stations TVX owned at the time, WTVZ joined the new Fox network. By this time, the other independent in the market—WYAH-TV (channel 27), owned by the Portsmouth-based Christian Broadcasting Network—had become more competitive, with total-day audiences slightly eclipsing WTVZ. Even though the Fox affiliation lifted WTVZ's ratings above WYAH and made it the company's only profitable TV station, TVX began to face financial problems after its large purchase of five major-market independents from Taft Broadcasting in 1986. It was forced to recapitalize and began selling its smaller stations.

=== McFadden/Max ownership ===
TVX announced in April 1989 that it would sell WTVZ-TV to Charles A. "Chuck" McFadden, its general manager, for $10.75 million (equivalent to $27.92 million in 2025). McFadden had been the general manager of the station since 1987 and prior to that was the vice president of station operations at TVX. Loving told the Daily Press, "Emotionally, it was difficult selling our flagship station, but as a public company, we were forced to listen to offers." McFadden expanded his television holdings by acquiring WSYT-TV, the Fox affiliate in Syracuse, New York, in 1990; the stations were put under the corporate name of Encore Communications.

While Fox grew into a seven-night-a-week network, bringing with it a doubling of total audience share and double-digit year-over-year increases in revenue in 1989, 1990, and 1991, the primary question for WTVZ under McFadden's ownership was that of possibly starting to produce a local newscast. The idea was first floated by the station in early 1991 for a start sometime between that May and late 1992, dependent on the national economy. By August 1992, it was considered a possibility for 1993, and a news budget was drafted in late 1994.

When ABC affiliate WVEC-TV opted not to carry the new show NYPD Blue for content reasons upon its October 1993 premiere, WTVZ initially stepped up to air the program in Hampton Roads. However, WTVZ also censored the program after McFadden had a change of heart, finding its nudity scenes "gross". When ABC learned of the station's own censorship, it insisted McFadden air the program without edits; the network then pulled the show from the station.

Encore Communications eventually became Max Television, which in turn was affiliated with Virginia Beach–based Max Media Properties, a concern in which TVX stakeholders Loving and Trinder were investors.

=== Sinclair ownership and loss of Fox affiliation ===
Sinclair Broadcast Group announced in December 1994 that it had agreed to buy WTVZ-TV for $48 million (equivalent to $104 million in 2025) from Max Television; the acquisition was structured as an asset sale, with the license to follow at a later date. The Sinclair acquisition came as a surprise to employees and brought the long-simmering 10 p.m. news plans to another hold pending a change in management; one employee told Larry Bonko of The Virginian-Pilot, "The representatives from Sinclair wore all black to the meeting, including black shirts. Can you believe it? It was an incredibly insensitive of them to dress like that." Sinclair management expressed optimism over the concept, but in November 1995, Steve Marx said the timing for starting the news operation, an expense estimated at $2 million (equivalent to $4 million in 2025), was not right.

On November 29, 1995, Fox announced that it would move its programming from WTVZ to WVBT (channel 43), a recently built station in Virginia Beach, beginning in September 1998. WVBT was an affiliate of The WB programmed under a local marketing agreement by local NBC affiliate WAVY-TV. The surprise switch was announced with no reason given; however, three weeks later, the situation came into focus when Fox executed a similar affiliation switch with Sinclair's WLFL in Raleigh, North Carolina. Like in Hampton Roads, Fox announced it would move to a WB affiliate programmed by a major network station in 1998 at the expiration of its existing Sinclair contract; Sinclair cited "different philosophical views about the future" for the change. The company apparently had little confidence in Fox plans to expand to late night and early morning slots as well as in the area of news. The additional network shows threatened to encroach on lucrative fringe periods where the Sinclair stations made money. Even though relations improved between Sinclair and Fox, the network had already signed affiliation agreements with its new Raleigh and Norfolk stations and carried out the switch, with WTVZ joining The WB on August 31, 1998. By that time, its general manager expressed a disdain for adding another newscast, noting that "[t]here is already too much news on the air in this market". The idea of news came up again in 2003, after Sinclair had set up its News Central service, though no newscast materialized.

=== MyNetworkTV affiliation ===
The WB and UPN announced on January 24, 2006, that they would be replaced by a new network, The CW, that fall. Announced among The CW's charter affiliates were a series of stations owned by UPN corporate parent CBS Corporation, including WGNT (the former WYAH-TV). The news of the merger resulted in Sinclair announcing in early March that 17 of its UPN and WB affiliates, including WTVZ-TV, would join MyNetworkTV, a new service formed by the News Corporation, which also owned the Fox network.

On May 15, 2012, Sinclair Broadcast Group and Fox agreed to a five-year affiliation agreement extension for Sinclair's 19 Fox-affiliated stations until 2017. This included an option, exercisable between July 1, 2012, and March 31, 2013, for Fox parent News Corporation to buy a combination of six Sinclair-owned stations (two CW/MyNetworkTV duopolies and two standalone MyNetworkTV affiliates) in three out of four markets; WTVZ was included in the Fox purchase option, along with stations in Cincinnati (WSTR-TV), Raleigh (WLFL and WRDC) and Las Vegas (KVCW and KVMY). In January 2013, Fox announced that it would not exercise its option to buy any of the Sinclair stations in those four markets mentioned.

In 2017, Sinclair entered into an agreement to acquire Tribune Media, which at the time was the operator of WTKR and WGNT. Sinclair would have had to select one of WGNT or WTVZ-TV to keep; though no divestiture plan was announced, Sinclair did mention specifically the possibility of launching a newscast for WTVZ. However, the transaction was designated in July 2018 for hearing by an FCC administrative law judge, and Tribune moved to terminate the deal in August 2018.

== Technical information ==
=== Subchannels ===
WTVZ's transmitter is located in Suffolk, Virginia. The station's signal is multiplexed:

Subchannels of WTVZ-TV
| Subchannel | Res. | Short name | Programming |
|---|---|---|---|
| 33.1 | 720p | MyTV | Main WTVZ-TV programming |
| 33.2 | 480i | Charge! | Charge! |
| 33.3 | 480i | Comet | Comet |
| 33.4 | 480i | ROAR | Roar |

=== Analog-to-digital conversion ===
WTVZ-TV discontinued regular programming on its analog signal, over UHF channel 33, on February 17, 2009, to conclude the federally mandated transition from analog to digital television. Its digital signal then moved from channel 38 to channel 33.
