= George Klein (DJ) =

American DJ (1935–2019)

- Born: October 8, 1935; Memphis, Tennessee, U.S.
- Died: February 5, 2019 (aged 83); Memphis, Tennessee, U.S.
- Occupation: Disc jockey
- Years active: 1957–2019
- Spouses: Barbara Little (m. 1970; div. 1979) Dara Patterson (m. 1998)

George "GK" Klein (October 8, 1935 – February 5, 2019) was an American DJ and television host. He met Elvis Presley in the eighth grade at Humes High School in North Memphis and they remained friends until Presley's death in 1977.

== Early life ==
George Klein was born on October 8, 1935, in Memphis, Tennessee, to immigrant parents, a Russian Jewish mother and Polish Jewish father who had both fled antisemitism in Europe. He grew up in an observant Orthodox Jewish home. He met Elvis Presley when both were 13 years old in the eighth grade in 1948 at Humes High School. "Elvis was the only kid in school that could sing," said Klein. "I was really lucky because his mother liked me." Others argue at the time it was Elvis who was the lucky one. Klein was the class president, the guy who the would-be 'king' looked up to.

== Career ==
=== Early career ===
Years later, it was Presley who stole the spotlight, recording songs at Sun Records. "So Elvis goes into That's Alright Mama and man he took off like fireworks! Sam said, 'son, I think you got something'," said Klein. Klein had a long and successful career as a Memphis radio DJ and TV personality, hitting the airwaves in 1957 and hosted Talent Party on WHBQ-TV from 1964 to 1973. He also was a member of the famed Memphis Mafia, consisting of Elvis Presley's closest friends and associates, and appeared in cameo roles in eight of Presley's movies. In his later years, Klein hosted both SiriusXM's channel 19 Elvis Radio and the George Klein Original Elvis Hour on WLFP FM. Klein also wrote two books. The first, Elvis Presley: A Family Album, was published in 2007, by Little, Brown and Company, an imprint of Hachette Book Group. The second, Elvis: My Best Man: Radio Days, Rock 'n' Roll Nights, was co-written with Chuck Crisafulli and published in 2011, by Three Rivers Press.

=== Criminal charges ===
Klein was indicted and convicted of mail fraud in 1977. Klein, the former program director for WHBQ radio Memphis, went to trial after being indicted on four counts of conspiring with a former postal employee to steal Arbitron diaries. Klein was acquitted of three mail fraud charges, but found guilty on one count of conspiracy and sentenced to 60 days in federal prison. Presley reportedly asked U.S. President Jimmy Carter, who he knew personally, to pardon Klein in June 1977. After serving his sentence in Shelby County Jail, Klein would be released by August 1977, and would serve as a pallbearer at Presley's funeral that month.

=== Later career ===
Klein was inducted into the Tennessee Radio Hall of Fame in 2013. In 2018, he was inducted into the Memphis Music Hall of Fame.

== Personal life and death ==
Klein married Barbara Little on December 5, 1970, in Presley's Las Vegas hotel suite, with Presley as his best man. Little later divorced Klein in 1979. Klein married Dara Patterson on May 8, 1998, in Memphis, and was still married at the time of his death.

Though Klein had never been a strictly observant Jew, he turned to his faith following the death of his close friend Elvis, stating in a later interview with the Jewish Chronicle, "I had never been a particularly Orthodox Jew, but after Elvis died, I followed the Jewish tradition of yahrzeit – a year of mourning marked with daily morning and evening prayers. I didn't wear the diamond ring that Elvis had given me and I don't think I even listened to any of his music during that year, because they were reminders of the loss that was just too painful for me."

He was a fan of the Memphis Tigers.

According to local news reports, Klein died in Memphis due to complications from dementia. The Twitter account of Priscilla Presley stated Klein had been in hospice care prior to his death. He also had pneumonia. Presley said of Klein that her former husband liked his personality, his loyalty, and his sense of humor. She called their friendship a "guys thing", with their own inside jokes and their "own language". She said she had been in constant contact with Klein and other of her former husband's friends Jerry Schilling and Marian Justice Cocke while Klein had been ill.
