= NewsChannel 3 =

NewsChannel 3 refers to:

- WREG-TV in Memphis, Tennessee
- WSAZ in Huntington/Charleston, West Virginia
- WWMT in Kalamazoo, Michigan
