= WEMT =

Television station in Greeneville, Tennessee

- Greeneville–Bristol–; Johnson City–Kingsport, Tennessee; Bristol, Virginia; United States
- City: Greeneville, Tennessee
- Channels: Digital: 28 (UHF); Virtual: 39

Programming
- Affiliations: 39.1: Roar; for others, see § Technical information and subchannels

Ownership
- Owner: Sinclair Broadcast Group; (Sinclair Media Licensee, LLC)
- Sister stations: WCYB-TV

History
- First air date: November 4, 1985
- Former call signs: WETO (1985–1989)
- Former channel numbers: Analog: 39 (UHF, 1985–2009); Digital: 38 (UHF, 2002–2019)
- Former affiliations: Independent (1985–1986); Fox (1986–2026)
- Call sign meaning: East Tennessee and former owner MT Communications, founded by Michael Thompson

Technical information
- Licensing authority: FCC
- Facility ID: 40761
- ERP: 1,000 kW
- HAAT: 719.3 m (2,360 ft)
- Transmitter coordinates: 36°26′58.2″N 82°6′28.7″W

Links
- Public license information: Public file; LMS

WEMT (channel 39) is a television station licensed to Greeneville, Tennessee, United States, serving the Tri-Cities area with programming from the digital multicast network Roar. It is owned by Sinclair Broadcast Group alongside Bristol, Virginia–licensed NBC/CW/Fox affiliate WCYB-TV (channel 5). The two stations share studios on Lee Street on the Virginia side of Bristol (straddling the Virginia–Tennessee line); WEMT's transmitter is located at Rye Patch Knob on Holston Mountain in the Cherokee National Forest.

Channel 39 began in November 1985 as WETO ("East Tennessee's Own"), the market's first independent station, under local ownership and with studios and offices in Greeneville. WETO affiliated with Fox the next year. The undercapitalized local owners sold the station in 1989 to MT Communications, which changed the call letters to WEMT. The station was sold again in 1992; it moved its studios to Johnson City, Tennessee. In 2006, then-WCYB-TV owner BlueStone Television acquired the station's non-license assets, while another group purchased the license; WCYB-TV has operated WEMT ever since under three different group owners. In December 2025, the Fox affiliation moved to WCYB 5.3, with WEMT continuing to simulcast the subchannel through January 2026.

== History ==
=== East Tennessee's Own ===
Medium Rare Inc., a company headed by Greeneville men Jay Austin and Robert Lochte, filed on October 20, 1982, for a construction permit to build a station on channel 39 in Greeneville. The Federal Communications Commission granted the permit on May 25, 1983; Medium Rare then sold WMGL, an FM radio station it owned in Pulaski, Tennessee.

WETO ("East Tennessee's Own") announced its forthcoming existence in March 1985; the station would have a general-entertainment independent format and studios in a Greeneville industrial park. The antenna, on a tower on Camp Creek Bald of Viking Mountain near Greeneville, was installed in September. The station, which began broadcasting on November 4, 1985, represented a $1.6 million investment for the owners.

WETO affiliated with Fox when the network launched in 1986. This made it the closest Fox affiliate to Knoxville, where it took a year for WKCH-TV to link up with the network.

As a business, WETO-TV suffered for several years. Undercapitalized from the start, Austin and Lochte failed to anticipate a surge in programming costs or changes in federal rules affecting cable systems. At first, East Tennessee's Own Inc. (the former Medium Rare) reached a deal in October 1988 to sell the station to MT Communications of Los Angeles, with most of the purchase price in assumption of debt. The original MT deal never took place, and in the meantime, the station was sued for failing to pay ASCAP dues and thereby broadcasting copyrighted music, including the theme to the Fox series Duet, without permission.

=== MT Communications ownership ===
On July 7, 1989, WETO and its assets were put up for public auction. The original winning bid of $1.9 million came from Elvin Feltner and his company, Krypton Broadcasting. (Note: For more information on Feltner and Krypton, see WTVX.) When Krypton failed to put together financing for the deal, MT Communications won the auction with its bid of $1.85 million.

MT Communications took over on November 15, 1989, and changed the call sign to WEMT on December 1. This call sign change coincided with similar moves at its Fox affiliates in Memphis (WMKW-TV to WLMT) and Nashville (WCAY-TV to WXMT). MT Communications also acquired WJWT, a struggling Fox affiliate in Jackson, and converted it to a semi-satellite of WLMT with local advertising that December; it became WMTU in January 1990. While revenues at WEMT increased 130 percent in 1990 and another 35 percent in 1991, the MT stations in Memphis and Nashville lost their Fox affiliations in 1990.

=== Max Media and Sinclair ownership ===
In December 1991, MT Communications moved to sell three of its four stations—WMTU, WLMT, and WEMT—to former Virginia lieutenant governor Dick Davis. Max Media—a Virginia company founded by three former officers of TVX Broadcast Group—then would manage the stations for Davis. Max Media began the process of moving WEMT out of Greeneville and to a more centrally located site in the Tri-Cities. The station already had a sales office in Johnson City, Tennessee, but it was insufficient to house the whole station. The entire operation moved to a new building on Hanover Road in Johnson City in February 1993. The station also analyzed the eventual possibility of starting a local newscast at this time. Max Media, which had only been serving as manager, acquired WEMT outright in 1994.

The company's stations were acquired by Sinclair Broadcast Group in 1998. Even though the larger deal closed in July 1998, Sinclair could not directly acquire WEMT because it owned a station with an overlapping coverage area, which was not permissible at the time; it instead took over operations under a local marketing agreement (LMA) with Max Media.

=== Operation with WCYB ===
In 2005, Sinclair sold WEMT's license for $1.4 million to Aurora Broadcasting Inc. and the non-license assets for $5.6 million to BlueStone Television, which owned NBC affiliate WCYB-TV in Bristol, Virginia. As part of the deal, WCYB-TV assumed most of the station's operations and began producing a local 10 p.m. newscast for WEMT. The Aurora purchase closed in February 2006; that May, BlueStone put all of its television properties on the market, and parallel with Bonten Media Group acquiring BlueStone, Esteem Broadcasting purchased WEMT from Aurora.

WEMT shut down its analog signal, over UHF channel 39, on June 12, 2009, the official date on which full-power television stations in the United States transitioned from analog to digital broadcasts under federal mandate. The station's digital signal remained on its pre-transition UHF channel 38, using virtual channel 39. However, the station continued to broadcast from Viking Mountain until November 2011, when its transmitter was moved to Holston Mountain, a shift northeast that improved the signal strength and coverage in the Tri-Cities and southwest Virginia while removing areas around Knoxville from the service area.

On April 21, 2017, Sinclair announced its intent to purchase the Bonten stations for $240 million. As an aspect of the deal, the Esteem stations were sold to Sinclair affiliate Cunningham Broadcasting, maintaining the current operational arrangement. Cunningham is controlled by trusts of the Smith family, which controls Sinclair. The sale was completed on September 1.

WEMT relocated its signal from channel 38 to channel 28 on April 12, 2019, as a result of the 2016 United States wireless spectrum auction.

Sinclair filed to buy WEMT outright from Cunningham in August 2025, following a decision by the United States Court of Appeals for the Eighth Circuit that struck down limitations on ownership of two of the four highest-rated TV stations in a market. On December 8, 2025, the Fox affiliation was moved to WCYB-TV's third subchannel. Fox was broadcast from both the WEMT and WCYB-TV transmitters until January 12, 2026, when WEMT switched to broadcasting Roar, a Sinclair-owned diginet. The sale was completed on March 1.

== Technical information and subchannels ==
WEMT's transmitter is located at Rye Patch Knob on Holston Mountain in the Cherokee National Forest. The station's signal is multiplexed:

Subchannels of WEMT
Subchannel	Res.	Short name	Programming
39.1	720p	WEMT-DT	Roar
39.2	480i	Comet	Comet
39.3	480i	Charge	Charge!
39.4	480i	TheNest	The Nest
39.5	480i	TCN	True Crime Network
39.6	480i	Rewind	Rewind TV
