= Fox 16 =

Fox 16 may refer to one of the following television stations in the U.S. affiliated with Fox:

- WJKT, television station in Jackson, Tennessee
- WPBI-CD, television station in Lafayette, Indiana
- KLRT-TV, television station in Little Rock, Arkansas
