= CW 30 =

CW 30 may refer to one of the following television stations in the United States affiliated with the Fox Broadcasting Company:

- KUCW in Ogden–Salt Lake City, Utah
- WLMT in Memphis, Tennessee
