= Paramount Stations Group =

American television station group (1991–2001)

Paramount Stations Group, Inc.
- Type: Division
- Industry: Television
- Predecessor: TVX Broadcast Group
- Founded: 1991; 35 years ago
- Defunct: 2001; 25 years ago
- Fate: Folded into the Viacom Television Stations Group in 2001 (later renamed CBS Television Stations in 2006)
- Successor: CBS News and Stations
- Headquarters: Hollywood, California, US
- Owner: Paramount Pictures (1991–2001)
- Parent: Paramount Communications (1991–1995); Viacom (1995–2001)

Paramount Stations Group, Inc. (PSG) was a company that controlled a group of American broadcast television stations. The company existed from 1991 until 2001.

== History ==
Paramount Communications, the then-parent company of Paramount Pictures, formed the Paramount Stations Group in 1991 after buying out the remaining stake in TVX Broadcast Group that it did not already own. At the time of the transition in 1991, the group consisted of six outlets: Fox affiliates KRRT (now KMYS) in the San Antonio area, WLFL-TV in Raleigh, and WTXF-TV in Philadelphia; and independent stations KTXA in Fort Worth, KTXH in Houston, and WDCA in Washington, D.C. Shortly thereafter, the group began its expansion with its purchase of then-Fox affiliate WKBD-TV in Detroit from Cox Enterprises in 1993.

The original incarnation of Viacom purchased Paramount in 1993, with the deal closing in March 1994; Viacom's existing group of CBS- and NBC-affiliated stations continued to be run separately from the Paramount stations until December 1995, when they were folded into PSG. Viacom also included its part-time LMA with WVIT, that of WTXX. Shortly afterward, Viacom entered into a joint venture with Chris-Craft Industries, which owned several television stations as part of its United Television subsidiary, to launch the United Paramount Network (UPN). Four of PSG's original six stations, along with several acquisitions such as WSBK-TV in Boston, and WTXX in Waterbury, which Viacom operated through a LMA with WVIT, became charter affiliates of the network when UPN launched in January 1995.

PSG sold off three of its original six stations as well; WLFL, KRRT, and WTXF were sold to other companies, with the latter becoming a Fox-owned station. To make up for the loss of its Philadelphia-owned station, PSG acquired Philadelphia independent station WGBS-TV and its call letters were changed to WPSG-TV, and the UPN affiliation was moved there. The company eventually divested itself of the CBS and NBC stations it held and purchased more UPN affiliates as the 1990s continued.

Airing since 1992 in Sweden and other European countries, 4 of the group's independent stations began in late December 1993 testing Video Games Challenge, interactive via the phone game show produced by Invisible Cities of Los Angeles and Big Band Productions of Sweden. In February 2000, Paramount Stations Group and ACME Communications reached an agreement.

In 2000, PSG acquired Chris-Craft's stake in UPN, shortly thereafter, Chris-Craft exited broadcasting and sold most of its stations to News Corporation's Fox Television Stations unit.

PSG was folded the next year after Viacom completed its merger with CBS. The remaining PSG stations were merged with the CBS owned-and-operated stations to form the Viacom Television Stations Group. Today, that group is called CBS News and Stations.

== Former stations ==
- Stations are arranged in alphabetical order by state and city of license.

Stations owned by Paramount Stations Group
Media market	State/District	Station	Purchased	Sold	Notes
Sacramento	California	KMAX-TV	1998	2000	
Hartford–New Haven	Connecticut	WVIT	1994	1997	(Note: Owned by Viacom prior to its purchase of Paramount.)
Hartford–New Haven	Connecticut	WTXX	1994	1997	(Note: Owned by a third party and operated by Viacom.)
Washington, D.C.	District of Columbia	WDCA	1991	2001	
Miami–Fort Lauderdale	Florida	WBFS-TV	1995	2000	
St. Petersburg–Tampa	Florida	WTOG	1996	2000	
West Palm Beach	Florida	WTVX	1997	2001	
Atlanta	Georgia	WUPA	1995	2000	
Indianapolis	Indiana	WNDY-TV	1998	2000	
Hutchinson–Wichita	Kansas	KSCC	2001	2001	(Note: Built by Viacom and signed on by a third party.)
New Orleans	Louisiana	WUPL	1997	2000	
Shreveport	Louisiana	KSLA-TV	1994	1996	
Boston	Massachusetts	WSBK-TV	1995	2000	
Detroit	Michigan	WKBD-TV	1993	2000	
St. Louis	Missouri	KMOV	1994	1997	
Albany–Schenectady	New York	WNYT	1994	1996	
Rochester	New York	WHEC-TV	1994	1996	
Raleigh–Durham	North Carolina	WLFL-TV	1991	1994	
Columbus	Ohio	WWHO	1997	2000	
Oklahoma City	Oklahoma	KAUT-TV	1998	2000	
Pittsburgh	Pennsylvania	WNPA-TV	1998	2000	
Philadelphia	Pennsylvania	WTXF-TV	1991	1995	
Philadelphia	Pennsylvania	WPSG	1995	2000	
Providence	Rhode Island	WLWC	1997	2001	
Fort Worth–Dallas	Texas	KTXA	1991	2000	
Houston	Texas	KTXH	1991	2001	
San Antonio	Texas	KRRT	1991	1995	
Norfolk–Newport News	Virginia	WGNT	1997	2000	
Tacoma–Seattle, WA	Washington	KSTW	1997	2000	
Tacoma–Seattle, WA	Washington	KIRO-TV	1997	1997	
