= Talent Party =

- Created by: George Klein
- Country of origin: United States
- No. of seasons: 9

Original release
- Network: WHBQ-TV
- Release: 1964 – 1973

Talent Party was a Southern teen dance TV program that aired between 1964 and 1973 featuring many of the popular artists in Rhythm and blues, rock and pop music of the day. The offshoot of Dance Party, it began airing on WHBQ-TV which had already produced several local programs featuring Memphis personalities. Hosted by disc jockey George Klein, Talent Party was hugely successful, giving many garage bands their first television appearances.
