= M. David Lee III =

American film director

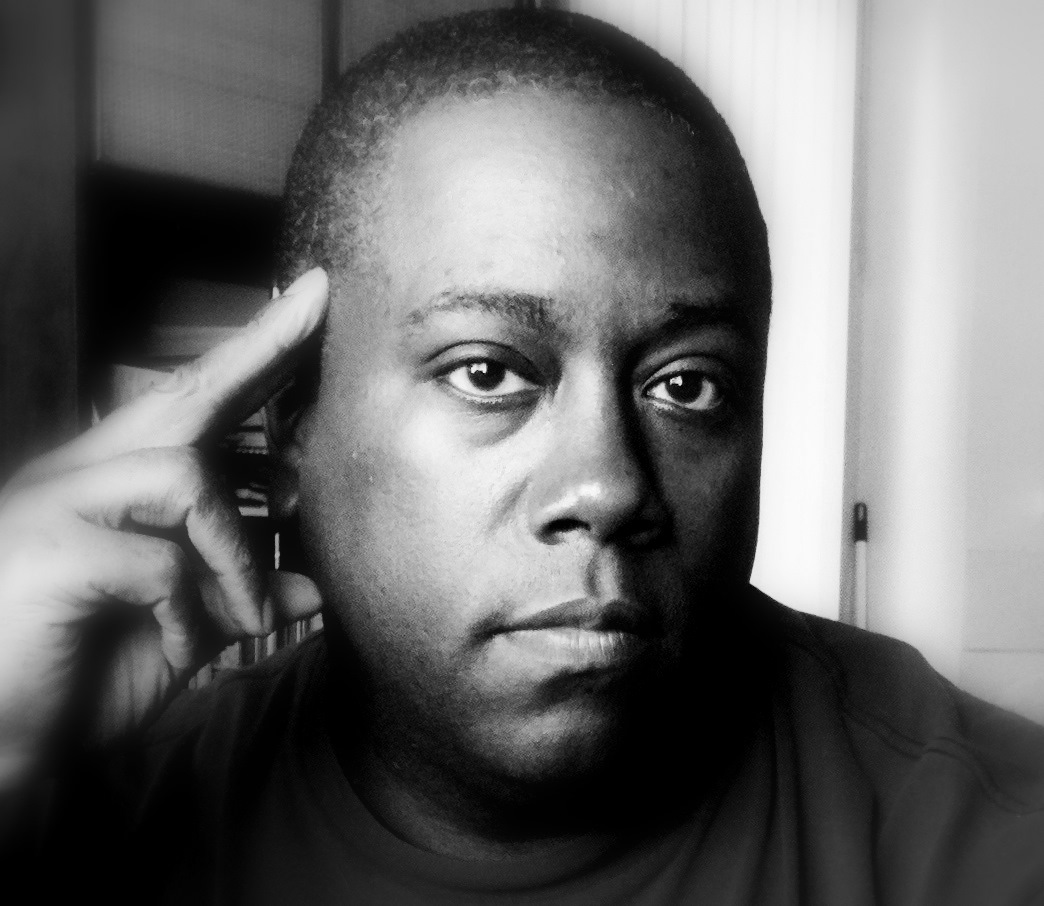
- Born: September 14, 1965 (age 60); Champaign, Illinois
- Occupations: Film director, producer, writer, editor
- Years active: 1977 – present
- Children: 1

M. David Lee III (born September 14, 1965, Champaign, Illinois) is an American film director, producer, writer, editor and director of photography. Lee is noted for his use of a version of the Dogme95 principals originally developed by Lars Von Trier and Thomas Vinterberg in his films. His production company, Triple Sticks Productions, has produced four feature films since 1997 and several short films dating back to the late '70s. Triple Sticks Productions is also distributing their film, Slow Down… You're Dating Too Fast!. Lee has also spent time as a sports anchor with Comcast SportsNet Mid-Atlantic, SNY, WHBQ, KNTV, KDOC, and KCOY-TV.

In 2009, "Dog Me: Potluck", was selected for distribution on Netflix.

== Early life and film career ==
Lee is the son of E. Ann Whittington, owner of Ambience Custom Flora design, and M. David Lee, FAIA, principal architect and owner of Stull and Lee Incorporated in Boston.

Lee taught drama and radio at Leland High School in San Jose. In 2001, he co-directed with Johnny DePalma and produced Enamored for Picture Show Productions in Los Gatos, California.

The following year, Lee moved to Memphis, to serve as sports director at WHBQ-TV Fox-13. In Memphis, Lee made two films, Dog Me: Potluck and Slow Down… You’re Dating Too Fast!

Dog Me: Potluck followed the Dogme95 Principals laid out by Lars Von Trier and Thomas Vinterberg. In his one violation of those rules, Lee used music by such artists as Sofia Sunseri and Aron Ford Lee of "House of Echo" and "DTMG".

With Slow Down… You're Dating Too Fast! Lee used a modified version of the Dogme95 principals. Lee's company, Triple Sticks Productions, currently is distributing the completed film, with extras. In 2008, "Slow Down... You're Dating Too Fast" screened at the Washougal International Film Festival.

== Personal life ==
Married once and divorced, Lee has one daughter. His brother, Aron Ford Lee is a musician and can be heard in two of his brother's films, Dog Me: Potluck and Slow Down… You’re Dating Too Fast!

== Filmography ==
This is a table of films that Lee has been involved in.

| Year | Film | Credited as | | | | |
| Year | Film | Director | Producer | Writer | Actor | DP |
|---|---|---|---|---|---|---|
| 1991 | My Law/ Your Order (1991 film), short | Yes | Yes | Yes | Yes | |
| 1993 | Black and White: Make Grey, (1993), Feature Rough-Cut | Yes | Yes | Yes | | |
| 1994 | Jessica Knows, (1994), Short | Yes | Yes | Yes | | Yes |
| 1994 | Behind the Lens... The Making of Jessica Knows, (1994), Documentary | Yes | Yes | Yes | | Yes |
| 1997 | 1–900, (1994), Feature | Yes | Yes | Yes | | |
| 1997 | "1–900: Between The Lines", (1997), Documentary | Yes | Yes | Yes | | |
| 1999 | 3 Days… 3 Hours… 3 Minutes… 3 Seconds…, (1999), Feature | Yes | Yes | Yes | | |
| 1999 | "3 Days… 3 Hours… 3 Minutes… 3 Seconds…: The Story Behind the Film", (1999), Documentary | Yes | Yes | Yes | | |
| 2001 | "Enamored", (2001), Feature Rough-Cut | Yes | Yes | | | |
| 2003 | Dog Me: Potluck, (2003), Feature | Yes | Yes | Yes | | Yes |
| 2003 | The Making of Dog Me: Potluck, (2003), Featurette | Yes | Yes | Yes | Yes | Yes |
| 2006 | Slow Down… You're Dating Too Fast!, (2006), Feature | Yes | Yes | Yes | | Yes |
| 2008 | The Making of Slow Down… You're Dating Too Fast!, (2008), Featurette | Yes | Yes | Yes | Yes | Yes |
