= WDCA =

Television station in Washington, D.C.

- Washington, D.C.; United States
- Channels: Digital: 36 (UHF), shared with WTTG; Virtual: 20
- Branding: Fox 5 Plus; Fox 5 News on the Plus

Programming
- Affiliations: 20.1: Independent with MyNetworkTV; for others, see § Subchannels

Ownership
- Owner: Fox Television Stations, LLC
- Sister stations: WTTG

History
- First air date: April 20, 1966
- Former channel numbers: Analog: 20 (UHF, 1966–2009); Digital: 35 (UHF, 2000–2018)
- Former affiliations: Independent (1966–1995); UPN (1995–2006)
- Call sign meaning: "Washington, District of Columbia Area"; also airport code for Ronald Reagan Washington National Airport

Technical information
- Licensing authority: FCC
- Facility ID: 51567
- ERP: 1,000 kW
- HAAT: 235 m (771 ft)
- Transmitter coordinates: 38°57′49.9″N 77°6′17.2″W

Links
- Public license information: Public file; LMS
- Website: www.fox5dc.com/fox5plus

WDCA (channel 20), branded as Fox 5 Plus, is a television station in Washington, D.C. It is programmed primarily as an independent station, but maintains a secondary affiliation with MyNetworkTV. WDCA is owned by Fox Television Stations alongside WTTG (channel 5); the two stations share studios on Wisconsin Avenue in Bethesda, Maryland, and are broadcast on the same multiplex from a tower on River Road nearby.

WDCA began broadcasting as an independent station in April 1966. It was founded by the Capital Broadcasting Company, whose president was Washington broadcaster Milton Grant; Grant sold the station in 1969 to the Superior Tube Company of Pennsylvania but remained general manager until January 1980, leaving to start a career in broadcast station ownership. Channel 20 served as Washington's second-rated independent behind WTTG for decades and as a longtime home for local sports coverage and children's programming.

After being owned by Taft Broadcasting from 1979 to 1987, WDCA and four other Taft-owned independent stations were sold to TVX Broadcast Group, which soon fell into financial difficulties because of the debt associated with the purchase. The Paramount Stations Group acquired WDCA and other stations in two parts between 1989 and 1991, bringing much-needed stability.

WDCA was one of several Paramount-owned stations to be charter outlets for the United Paramount Network (UPN) in 1995; in 2001, after UPN was acquired by CBS, Fox took possession of the station in a trade and merged its operations with WTTG. When UPN merged into The CW in 2006, bypassing all of Fox's UPN and independent stations in the process, the station became part of Fox's MyNetworkTV service. The station was rebranded as Fox 5 Plus, an expansion of WTTG, in 2017, and it airs several WTTG-produced prime time newscasts.

== History ==
The first interest around channel 20 came in the early 1950s, shortly after the assignment of ultra high frequency (UHF) channels nationwide. Three Washington radio stations—WWDC, WGMS, and WEAM—had applied for the channel by May 1953. WGMS won the permit in 1954, but it returned it in 1956, with company president N. Robert Rogers having "regretfully concluded" that the station would not be viable.

=== Construction ===
On November 19, 1962, Capital Broadcasting Company applied to build a new television station on channel 20 in Washington, D.C. By May, the Federal Communications Commission (FCC) had received a second application, from Automated Electronics, Inc. of Dallas, which proposed to install the station in nearby Arlington, Virginia. (Note: Automated Electronics had planned to build a station in Dallas that would have aired specialty business information, though this never materialized.) Capital Broadcasting comprised six stockholders including Milton Grant, a high-profile personality on WTTG (channel 5) from 1956 to 1961 as host of The Milt Grant Show, a teen dance hour. As part of his transition from an on-air personality to a media executive, Grant began going by Milton instead of Milt. Capital Broadcasting was granted the construction permit on August 13, 1963.

WDCA-TV began broadcasting on April 20, 1966, with a schedule emphasizing sports programming. It was the third independent station in Washington—after WTTG and WOOK-TV (channel 14)—and the area's third UHF outlet following WOOK-TV and WETA-TV (channel 26). After a decade, Vince McMahon's Capitol Wrestling Corporation promotion moved from channel 5 to channel 20. The station's sports programming ranged from the Virginia Sailors of the Atlantic Coast Football League to local high school football. Some games, particularly hockey, were tape delayed for the sole purpose of adding commercial breaks. Grant boasted that the station was turning a profit within 18 months, having projected not to do so in at least three years.

=== Superior Tube ownership ===
WDCA's logo under Superior Tube ownership used throughout the 1970s

In 1968, Grant reached an agreement to sell channel 20 to the Superior Tube Company, a metal tube manufacturer based in Wynnewood, Pennsylvania; Grant would remain as general manager. Prior to finalizing the agreement with Superior Tube, it was reported that the station was in negotiations to be purchased by Bishop Industries, the parent company of Hazel Bishop cosmetics. Despite its claims that WDCA-TV had become profitable sooner than projected, Capital Broadcasting had lost "substantial sums" on channel 20. Grant and his partners no longer had the money to continue running the station. That finding was key in the FCC approving the $2.2 million sale in May 1969.

Channel 20 continued to promote itself as a sports station, airing 10 games of the Washington Caps of the American Basketball Association in the 1969–70 season and serving as the originating station for Baltimore Bullets basketball even though the team had not yet moved to Washington. In 1977, the station signed a five-year deal for full live coverage of mostly away games for the nascent Washington Capitals, replacing WTOP-TV (channel 9); that station's sporadic and often tape-delayed and edited coverage was called "revolting" by The Washington Post. WDCA entered into a similar deal with the relocated Washington Bullets the same year, also replacing WTOP-TV. The station began splitting coverage of both teams with cable channel Home Team Sports (now Monumental Sports Network) in 1984, an arrangement that continued until both teams moved their over-the-air games to WBDC-TV (channel 50) in 1995. It was also the Washington-area affiliate of the Baltimore Orioles television network.

In the 1970s and 1980s, WDCA-TV also featured a variety of other local programs. For children, the station featured "Captain 20", a children's show host created in 1969 but played by Dick Dyszel from 1972 to 1987; Dyszel also doubled as "Gore De Vol", host of the station's late night horror movies. The Captain 20 Club, wrapped around afternoon cartoons ranging from Bugs Bunny to Ultraman, also included regular monkey races. From 1972 until his death in 1984, channel 20 also broadcast Petey Greene's Washington, a public affairs program hosted by Ralph "Petey" Greene, civil-rights activist and native Washingtonian.

=== Taft ownership ===
Superior Tube originally agreed to sell WDCA-TV to the Tribune Company for $12 million in January 1978. However, when ratings results for January and early February turned up major increases in viewership for channel 20, Superior Tube raised its asking price, and Tribune backed out of the sale in early March. Another broadcast station owner, Taft Broadcasting, then struck an agreement to purchase WDCA-TV for $13.5 million. The deal took more than a year to close, in part because of objections raised over children's programming by a group known as WATCH (Washington Association for Television and Children). Due to inflation, a strong market for TV stations, and the length of time the deal took to approve, Taft raised its price to $15.5 million.

Even though the FCC approved a contingent license renewal and the transfer of the license in mid-August 1979, a federal appeals court temporarily blocked the purchase and ordered Taft not to operate the station, though the FCC rejected WATCH's motion. At issue was an infrequently enforced and commonly waived FCC policy restricting the number of TV stations that one group could own in the top 50 markets. The FCC officially dropped the policy in November 1979 after the WDCA-TV sale, its only attempt to enforce it in 13 years. The appeals court upheld the sale in 1981, primarily because of the mootness of the case in light of the repeal, though it criticized the FCC's handling of the case.

In January 1980, Grant left channel 20 after nearly 14 years as general manager in order to file an application to build a new station on the unused channel 14. By this time, channel 20 had firmly established itself as the second independent in the market. It had also become a regional superstation, with a cable footprint stretching as far north as southern Pennsylvania and as far south as Charlotte, North Carolina. However, channel 20 continued to lag far behind WTTG, which was the nation's highest-rated independent station during 1984. Per Paul Harris in Variety, the station attracted "some undistinguished ratings" outside of its children's and sports programming. To that end, in September 1986, the station conducted a schedule overhaul with increased sports programming and more movies. The change touched every part of the station except the call letters, and management had even contemplated changing those. Tony Vinciquerra, who later became the president of Fox Networks Group, served as WDCA-TV's general sales manager from 1985 to 1986.

Taft put its broadcast group up for sale in August 1986 due to agitation by investor Robert Bass; while it asked $500 million for five independent stations, the winning bidder—TVX Broadcast Group of Norfolk, Virginia—only paid $240 million, and Taft estimated its after-tax loss for the sale at $45 to $50 million. TVX implemented budget cuts, laying off about 15 percent of the staff at the acquisitions; in Washington, 11 employees were immediately laid off—of a planned reduction of 18 personnel—and the production of local children's and public affairs programming was canceled. Among the employees TVX laid off was Dyszel.

The Taft stations purchase left TVX highly leveraged and highly vulnerable. TVX's bankers, Salomon Brothers, provided the financing for the acquisition and in return held more than 60 percent of the company. The company was to pay Salomon Brothers $200 million on January 1, 1988, but missed the first payment deadline, having been unable to lure investors to its junk bonds even before Black Monday. While TVX recapitalized by the end of 1988, Salomon Brothers reached an agreement in principle in January 1989 for Paramount Pictures to acquire options to purchase the investment firm's majority stake. This deal was replaced in September with an outright purchase of 79 percent of TVX for $110 million.

=== Paramount ownership and affiliation with UPN ===
In 1991, Paramount acquired the remainder of TVX, forming the Paramount Stations Group. The deal gave Paramount a strategic entrance into the television stations market. The original Viacom purchased the group as part of its acquisition of Paramount Pictures in 1993.

WDCA became an affiliate of the United Paramount Network (UPN) upon its launch in January 1995. From 1995 to 1997, annual revenues rose from $17 million to $45 million.

=== Fox ownership ===
WDCA's second and final UPN logo, used from 2002 to 2006.

In 2000, Viacom purchased CBS. On August 12 of that year, United Television—the United in UPN—sold its UPN stations to the Fox Television Stations subsidiary of News Corporation for $5.5 billion; the deal was finalized on July 31, 2001. As part of its acquisition of United Television, Fox had purchased KBHK-TV in San Francisco, a city in which Fox did not own its affiliate—but there was a CBS owned-and-operated station. Similarly, Viacom now owned UPN stations in Houston (KTXH) and Washington, D.C. (WDCA), markets where it did not own the CBS affiliate but where there was a Fox owned-and-operated station. It also needed to reduce its national coverage to come under FCC ownership limits. As a result, Fox traded KBHK-TV to Viacom in exchange for KTXH and WDCA, resulting in three new duopolies, including new Fox duopolies in Houston and Washington. The FCC approved the deal in August 2001 on the condition that Viacom sell one of its San Francisco radio stations.

Fox consolidated the two stations' operations at WTTG's studios in Washington's Friendship Heights neighborhood, and it also dismissed WDCA's general manager, placing both stations under WTTG's management.

=== As a MyNetworkTV station ===
WDCA logos during 2006

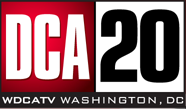
January–May 2006, after the CW merger announcement, as "DCA 20" with all UPN branding removed

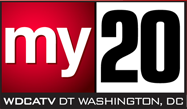
May–June 2006

June 2006–July 16, 2017, with the MyNetworkTV branding in place

On January 24, 2006, the Warner Bros. unit of Time Warner and CBS Corporation (which had been created as a result of the split of Viacom at the start of the year) announced that the two companies would shut down The WB and UPN and combine the networks' respective programming to create a new "fifth" network called The CW. In unveiling the merged network, while WB and UPN affiliates owned by WB minority stakeholder Tribune Broadcasting (including WBDC-TV in Washington) and by CBS Television Stations were announced as charter outlets, none of the Fox-owned UPN stations—many of which were competitors to these stations—were chosen. Fox immediately moved to strip the stations of UPN branding. The next month, News Corporation announced the creation of its own secondary network, MyNetworkTV, to serve its own outgoing UPN stations as well as those that had not been selected for The CW.

WDCA shut down its analog signal, over UHF channel 20, on June 12, 2009, the official date on which full-power television stations in the United States transitioned from analog to digital broadcasts under federal mandate. The station's digital signal continued to broadcast on its pre-transition UHF channel 35, using virtual channel 20.

On April 4, 2017, the FCC announced that WDCA was a winner in the 2016–17 spectrum reallocation auction and in return received $119 million for the frequency. WDCA ceased broadcasting its own signal over channel 35 on July 18, 2018, continuing to broadcast on WTTG's multiplex.

On April 17, 2017, Fox announced that WDCA would be re-branded as "Fox 5 Plus" on July 17, to provide better name recognition with and aligning it as an extension of WTTG, including a new 8 p.m. prime time newscast. WTTG and WDCA relocated from Friendship Heights along Wisconsin Avenue to new studios in Bethesda, Maryland, in 2021.

== Newscasts ==
In July 1995, WDCA experimented with a half-hour nightly 10 p.m. newscast, UPN 20 News at 10, to compete with WTTG's long-running prime time newscast. The newscast was produced by regional cable news channel NewsChannel 8. The newscast was discontinued in the summer of 1996.

WDCA began airing an 8 p.m. prime time newscast, Fox 5 News on the Plus, on July 17, 2017, as a half-hour broadcast on weekdays and a full hour on weekends. News updates would also air throughout the day. A 9 p.m. half-hour was added in 2018 as part of a series of news expansions across the Fox Television Stations group. The station also has an hour-long 7 p.m. newscast on Saturdays and a 30-minute 7 p.m. newscast on Sundays. In February 2022, WDCA began simulcasting an hour of programming on weekdays from Fox Weather.

== Subchannels ==
WTTG and WDCA are broadcast from a transmitter facility on River Road in Bethesda, Maryland.

Subchannels of WTTG and WDCA
License	Subchannel	Res.	Short name	Programming
WTTG	5.1	720p	WTTG-DT	Fox
WTTG	5.2	480i	BUZZR	Buzzr
WTTG	5.3	480i	START	Start TV
WDCA	20.1	720p	WDCA	Main WDCA programming
WDCA	20.2	480i	MOVIES	Movies!
WDCA	20.3	480i	HEROES	Heroes & Icons
WDCA	20.4	480i	FOXWX	Fox Weather
