= WLMT =

Television station in Memphis, Tennessee

- Memphis, Tennessee; United States
- Channels: Digital: 31 (UHF); Virtual: 30
- Branding: CW 30 Memphis

Programming
- Affiliations: 30.1: The CW/MyTV; for others, see § Subchannels

Ownership
- Owner: Tegna Inc., a subsidiary of Nexstar Media Group; (Tegna Memphis Broadcasting, Inc.)
- Sister stations: WATN-TV; Nexstar: WREG-TV

History
- First air date: April 18, 1983
- Former call signs: WMKW-TV (1983–1989)
- Former channel numbers: Analog: 30 (UHF, 1983–2009)
- Former affiliations: Independent (1983–1986, 1990–1995); Fox (1986–1990); UPN (1995–2006); The WB (secondary, 2003–2006); MyNetworkTV (WWE SmackDown! 2009–2010, 30.2 2010–2016)
- Call sign meaning: MT represents former owner Michael Thompson

Technical information
- Licensing authority: FCC
- Facility ID: 68518
- ERP: 871 kW
- HAAT: 340 m (1,115 ft)
- Transmitter coordinates: 35°16′33″N 89°46′38″W

Links
- Public license information: Public file; LMS

WLMT (channel 30) is a television station in Memphis, Tennessee, United States, serving as the market's local outlet for The CW, with a secondary affiliation with MyNetworkTV. It is owned by the Tegna subsidiary of Nexstar Media Group alongside ABC affiliate WATN-TV (channel 24); Nexstar also owns CBS affiliate WREG-TV (channel 3). WLMT and WATN-TV share studios at the Shelby Oaks Corporate Park on Shelby Oaks Drive in northeast Memphis and transmitter facilities near Brunswick.

Channel 30 began broadcasting as WMKW-TV on April 18, 1983. Owned by a consortium of TVX Broadcast Group and local investors including Kemmons Wilson, it was the second independent station in the market behind channel 24, then WPTY-TV. It was the original Memphis affiliate of Fox from 1986 to 1990. However, after TVX sold the station to MT Communications (who changed its call sign to WLMT) in 1989, it lost the Fox affiliation to the higher-rated WPTY-TV in 1990. MT Communications also purchased a TV station in Jackson and renamed it WMTU; it simulcast most of channel 30's programming, though in later years this was limited to local newscasts.

Clear Channel Communications, the then-owner of WPTY-TV, began leasing channel 30 in 1993, leading to a merger of operations. In 1995, the station became an affiliate of UPN and added a local 9 p.m. newscast in conjunction with WPTY-TV's switch to ABC; the local newscast has been competitive in the market, sometimes beating channel 24's own late news. The station became an affiliate of The CW in 2006; it was already airing programming from its predecessors, UPN and The WB. It was acquired by Newport Television in 2007, Nexstar Broadcasting Group in 2012, and Tegna in 2019; Nexstar reacquired WLMT in 2026 with their purchase of Tegna.

== History ==
The first attempt to build channel 30 in Memphis was made by Memphis Telecasters, Inc., which applied for the channel in March 1966. A construction permit for WMTU-TV was awarded in June to the firm, which consisted half of Memphians and half of doctors from Charlotte, North Carolina, and Washington, D.C., who were operating WCTU-TV in Charlotte. Memphis Telecasters never built the channel and assigned the still-active construction permit in 1975 to the Christian Broadcasting Network (CBN). CBN proposed to air family-friendly and religious programs. The station was still not built by 1977, and CBN intended to sell the permit to Evans Broadcasting Corporation, whose holdings included another channel 30: KDNL-TV in St. Louis.

=== WMKW-TV: The TVX years ===
As the WMTU-TV permit vanished, interest began again when Memphis 30, Inc., applied for the channel in February 1979. Among the members of this ownership group were Kemmons Wilson, the founder of Holiday Inn, and George S. Flinn Jr. Memphis 30 merged with another applicant, TV 30, Inc., and a third minority owner, Television Corporation Stations Inc. (TVX, later renamed the TVX Broadcast Group), to form Memphis Area Telecasters, which won the construction permit in 1981. The next year, TVX became the 51-percent owner of the station, which adopted the call letters WMKW-TV (Memphis/Kemmons Wilson). The antenna was mounted on the tower of WKNO, while studios were set up in an industrial park.

After several days of delays due to bad weather impeding completion, WMKW-TV began broadcasting on April 18, 1983. Competing with existing independent WPTY-TV (channel 24), the new station offered Metro Conference basketball, as well as children's programs, movies, and classic sitcoms and dramas. The new station found itself running behind WPTY-TV in the ratings.

WMKW-TV became a charter affiliate of Fox at the network's launch on October 9, 1986, as part of a group agreement involving all eight TVX-owned stations. That year, it also obtained rights to a major sports attraction in the market, Memphis State University men's basketball, with all home and away games being shown live. The Memphis State telecasts raised the station's profile in the market.

While channel 30 was making headway, TVX's financial picture changed significantly after its 1986 acquisition of five large-market independents from Taft Broadcasting. The Taft stations purchase left TVX highly leveraged and highly vulnerable. TVX's bankers, Salomon Brothers, provided the financing for the acquisition and in return held more than 60 percent of the company. The company was to pay Salomon Brothers $200 million on January 1, 1988, and missed the first payment deadline, having been unable to lure investors to its junk bonds even before Black Monday. TVX initially announced it would sell some stations, including possibly WMKW-TV, and though it backed off the plan months later after announcing a refinancing plan, it began selling off smaller-market properties to help finance its debt. An initial deal was reached with Bain Capital in December 1988—the same month that the station doubled its effective radiated power—a deal that fell apart a month later.

=== MT Communications ownership ===
In March 1989, TVX announced it would sell WMKW-TV to MT Communications, owned by Michael Thompson, for $7 million—a purchase price lower than executives had hoped the station would fetch. MT Communications also owned two other Fox affiliates in Tennessee: WCAY-TV in Nashville, which like WMKW-TV had been built by TVX, and WETO-TV in Greeneville. On October 4, 1989, MT Communications changed the call letters of its stations to designations incorporating the letters MT, Thompson's initials, with WMKW-TV becoming WLMT. MT Communications also acquired WJWT, a struggling Fox affiliate in Jackson, and converted it to a semi-satellite of WLMT with local advertising that December; it became WMTU in January 1990.

MT's ownership of the station would see it lose its two principal programming draws to WPTY-TV. Rights to Memphis State basketball were put up for bid in 1989, with WMKW-TV competing against WPTY-TV and syndicator Creative Sports. WMKW-TV almost changed its call letters to WMSU—which had become available as a result of call letter changes elsewhere—but held off because the university feared it would impact their decision. The rights went to WPTY-TV, which paid the university three times more per game than WMKW-TV had in its previous contract.

The next year, the Fox affiliation came up for renewal, and WPTY-TV intensively lobbied the Fox network; it had stronger ratings than channel 30, drawing a 7.4 percent share of total-day ratings to WLMT's 4.1. On WLMT, some Fox shows had less than half the audience they did in other cities. Fox chose to move its affiliation to channel 24 effective July 1, 1990. However, WMTU continued to hold the Fox affiliation in the Jackson market, breaking away from channel 30 to air the network's programs. This continued until March 1992, when the local operation in Jackson was closed: local commercials no longer aired on WMTU, and five jobs were eliminated. Memphis was one of four markets, all in the South, where Fox moved its affiliation during 1990; of the other three, two (Little Rock, Arkansas, and Nashville) involved ex-TVX stations, with the Nashville station losing its Fox affiliation also owned by MT.

=== Max Media ownership and Clear Channel LMA ===
In December 1991, MT Communications moved to sell three of its four stations—WMTU, WLMT, and WEMT—to former Virginia lieutenant governor Dick Davis. Max Media—a Virginia company founded by three former officers of TVX—then would manage the stations for Davis. Morrie Beitch, who had been general manager of WMKW-TV under TVX from 1987 to 1989 and had stayed with the company after it sold channel 30, returned to lead the station, telling The Commercial Appeal, "I worked for [TVX executive] John Trinder for 6 1/2 years and I jumped at the chance to go to work for him in this city again."

Max Media's involvement with WLMT–WMTU operations was comparatively brief, as in August 1993, the two stations were leased to WPTY-TV owner Clear Channel Communications, which also purchased their physical assets. Five WLMT employees, including general manager Beitch, were laid off, as all three stations now shared a general manager. The deal was seen to give the unprofitable WLMT the resources it needed to adequately promote itself. (Clear Channel would move to acquire WLMT and WMTU in 1999, when duopolies were legalized.) Even though WPTY had renewed its rights to Memphis State basketball in 1992, University of Memphis basketball moved to WLMT by 1994. (Note: Memphis State University was renamed the University of Memphis in 1994.)

With two new networks starting in 1995, both—UPN and The WB—wooed WLMT as an affiliate. Clear Channel affiliated WLMT and another station it managed in Tulsa with UPN. The station's operations were consolidated in the same building with WPTY-TV in 1995 when that station moved to new studios as part of its affiliation switch to ABC and startup of a news department. The WB never scored a full-time affiliate in Memphis in its eleven-year history; the then-superstation feed of Chicago station WGN-TV served as the de facto Memphis home of WB programming until 1999, when WPTY-TV took on a secondary affiliation with the network and began airing its prime time programs in late night slots, and it moved to a slightly earlier time slot at WLMT in 2003. However, UPN's programming lineup, targeted at Black audiences, resonated in Memphis, where they represented about 40 percent of TV households; in 2004, WLMT was one of the highest-rated UPN affiliates in the United States, and the station was fourth in revenue, ahead of one major network affiliate.

WLMT's final logo as a UPN affiliate, used from 2002 to 2006.

WMTU in Jackson, while remaining a UPN affiliate, was slowly split off of WLMT in 2001 when the station changed its call sign to WJKT. WJKT began simulcasting WLMT's Memphis newscast in 2003.

WLMT debuted an in-studio wrestling program from Memphis Wrestling in 2003, two years after WMC-TV canceled its long-running wrestling show.

=== CW affiliation ===
In 2006, UPN and The WB were shut down and replaced with The CW, with which WLMT affiliated. (WJKT in Jackson instead rejoined Fox.)

WLMT and WPTY-TV were included in the sale of Clear Channel's television station portfolio to Newport Television, controlled by Providence Equity Partners, for $1.2 billion on April 20, 2007 (equivalent to $1.86 billion in 2025). The sale was made so Clear Channel could refocus around its radio, outdoor advertising and live event units. The sale received FCC approval on December 1, 2007; after settlement of a lawsuit filed by Clear Channel owners Thomas H. Lee Partners and Bain Capital against Providence to force the deal's completion, consummation took place on March 14, 2008. In 2009, an agreement was signed to air programs supplied by MyNetworkTV.

As part of a liquidation of Newport Television's assets, Nexstar Broadcasting Group purchased WPTY-TV and WATN-TV in a 12-station deal worth $285.5 million (equivalent to $400 million in 2025) on July 19, 2012. Nearly immediately, Nexstar announced that it would move the stations from their aging five-story building in midtown Memphis into a former MCI call center in the Shelby Oaks Corporate Park on the city's northeast side. The relocation, in addition to providing more up-to-date facilities for the stations, was done because the impending replacement of the adjacent Poplar Viaduct would create vibrations and noise making the building unsuitable for television production. WPTY-TV became WATN-TV after moving into the new studios.

In 2019, Nexstar acquired Tribune Media, owner of Memphis CBS affiliate WREG-TV. Nexstar opted to retain WREG-TV (as well as WJKT in Jackson) and sold WLMT and WATN-TV to Tegna Inc. In August 2025, Nexstar agreed to acquire Tegna for $6.2 billion; the deal was completed on March 19, 2026, following approval by the FCC's Media Bureau for Nexstar to own three full-power station licenses in markets such as Memphis. A temporary restraining order issued one week later by the U.S. District Court for the Eastern District of California, later escalated to a preliminary injunction, has prevented Nexstar from integrating the stations.

== Newscasts ==
WPTY-TV established a news department on December 1, 1995, coinciding with its affiliation switch to ABC. As part of the rollout of news, WLMT debuted a 9 p.m. newscast, News Watch 30. The newscast was anchored by Robb Harleston and Ken Houston—the first time two Black men had co-anchored a newscast in Memphis. The program was aimed at Black audiences and sought to provide more in-depth coverage of minority communities in the area. Houston became the lone anchor when WPTY-TV opted not to renew Harleston's contract in January 1997. The news focus fit well with the Black-oriented programs on UPN's lineup. This drew considerable viewership to WLMT's newscast, even against Fox affiliate WHBQ-TV's 9 p.m. news hour; in November 1997, it only barely trailed WHBQ and had better ratings than the 10 p.m. news on WPTY-TV.

WLMT's news has mostly been affected by changes at channel 24, long the fourth-rated news outlet in Memphis. The news product was overhauled in 2003 under the brand Eyewitness News and with new news talent. Even despite the move to a more general-market product, which included 45 minutes of news and an expanded 15-minute sportscast, WLMT's 9 p.m. news continued to beat WPTY's 10 p.m. broadcast and approach WHBQ in the ratings. By the major relaunch of channel 24 in 2013, the station was airing a 7 a.m. hour of WATN-TV's morning newscast.

== Technical information ==
=== Subchannels ===
WLMT's transmitter is located near Brunswick. The station's signal is multiplexed:

Subchannels of WLMT
Subchannel	Res.	Short name	Programming
30.1	1080i	WLMT-HD	The CW (primary); MyNetworkTV (secondary)
30.2	480i	MeTV	MeTV
30.3	480i	StartTV	Start TV
30.4	480i	GetTV	Great
30.5	480i	ShopLC	Shop LC
30.6	480i	NOSEY	Nosey
30.7	480i	CONFESS	(Blank)
30.8	480i	Rewind	Rewind TV

=== Analog-to-digital conversion ===
WPTY-TV and WLMT began digital broadcasting on May 1, 2002. WLMT ended regular programming on its analog signal, over UHF channel 30, on February 17, 2009; it was the only Memphis station to transition earlier than the delayed June 12 shutoff date. The station's digital signal remained on its pre-transition UHF channel 31, using virtual channel 30.
