= WHBQ-TV =

Television station in Memphis, Tennessee

- Memphis, Tennessee; United States
- Channels: Digital: 13 (VHF); Virtual: 13
- Branding: Fox 13

Programming
- Affiliations: 13.1: Fox; for others, see § Subchannels

Ownership
- Owner: Standard Media; (Community News Media LLC)

History
- First air date: September 27, 1953
- Former channel numbers: Analog: 13 (VHF, 1953–2009); Digital: 53 (UHF, 1999–2009)
- Former affiliations: CBS (1953–1956); ABC (secondary 1953–1956, primary 1956–1995)
- Call sign meaning: "We Have Better Quartets" (derived from WHBQ (AM))

Technical information
- Licensing authority: FCC
- Facility ID: 12521
- ERP: 95 kW
- HAAT: 305 m (1,001 ft)
- Transmitter coordinates: 35°10′29″N 89°50′43″W

Links
- Public license information: Public file; LMS
- Website: www.fox13memphis.com

WHBQ-TV (channel 13) is a television station in Memphis, Tennessee, United States, affiliated with the Fox network and owned by Standard Media. The station's studios are located on South Highland Street in East Memphis (near the campus of the University of Memphis), and its transmitter is located on Raleigh-LaGrange Road on the city's northeast side.

== History ==
=== Under RKO General ===
The station first signed on the air on September 27, 1953. It was owned by Harding College of Searcy, Arkansas, along with WHBQ radio (560 AM and 105.9 FM, now WGKX). It originally operated as a primary CBS and secondary ABC affiliate, sharing the latter network's programming with NBC affiliate WMCT (channel 5, now WMC-TV). Channel 13 lost the CBS affiliation when WREC-TV (channel 3, now WREG-TV) signed on in January 1956, assuming the affiliation through the CBS Radio Network's longtime affiliation with radio station WREC (600 AM); WHBQ-TV then became an exclusive ABC affiliate. General Teleradio, the broadcasting arm of the General Tire and Rubber Company, purchased the WHBQ stations in March 1954. In 1955, General Tire purchased RKO Radio Pictures in order to give its television stations a film and program library to draw from outside of network and local programming. RKO was merged into General Teleradio; General Tire's broadcasting and film divisions were later renamed RKO General in 1957.

RKO General was under nearly continuous investigation from the 1960s onward due to a long history of lying to advertisers and regulators. For example, it was nearly forced out of broadcasting in 1980 after misleading the Federal Communications Commission (FCC) about corporate misconduct at parent General Tire. Under the guidance of longtime general manager Alex Bonner, WHBQ-AM-FM-TV avoided the issues and scrutiny seen in the company's larger markets of New York, Boston and Los Angeles, with WHBQ-FM sold to Barnstable Communications in 1983. The regulatory pressure on RKO General continued unabated until 1987, when an FCC administrative law judge ruled the company unfit to be a broadcast licensee due to its rampant dishonesty. After the FCC advised RKO that appealing the decision was not worth the effort, RKO began unwinding its broadcast operations. The WHBQ stations were the next-to-last to be sold, with WHBQ-TV only being sold after Bonner's retirement in 1990 to Adams Communications, with its AM sister station sold to local businessperson George Flinn's Flinn Broadcasting shortly thereafter.

=== Transition to Fox ===
Vertical version of WHBQ's logo, utilized since 2006

Adams was in severe financial straits by 1994, and sold the station to the Communications Corporation of America (ComCorp); the sale was finalized on August 17 of that year. Only a short time later, ComCorp sold WHBQ-TV to the News Corporation, then-owner of the Fox network; the sale closed on July 5, 1995. After the sale was closed, News Corporation had to run the station for over five months as an ABC affiliate, as the affiliation contract with then-Fox affiliate WPTY-TV (channel 24) did not expire until November 30. Fox had signed a deal with New World Communications the year prior to switch the network affiliations of most of its "Big Three"-affiliated stations to the network. News Corporation's purchase of channel 13 built on this, and was in part positioning to have a station in a market that was, at the time, in contention for landing an NFL team, as Fox had just gained the broadcast rights to the league's National Football Conference division in 1994, although the NFL spent only one year in Memphis when the then-Tennessee Oilers moved from Houston to the Liberty Bowl before settling in Nashville and becoming the Titans.

When the station's affiliation agreement with ABC ended on December 1, 1995, Fox programming moved to WHBQ-TV, becoming the third Memphis station to affiliate with the network, as WMKW-TV (channel 30, now WLMT) was the area's original Fox affiliate from the network's October 1986 launch until it moved to WPTY in 1990. The ABC affiliation moved to WPTY (now WATN-TV).

On June 13, 2007, News Corporation placed WHBQ-TV and eight other stations up for sale. Local TV, a broadcast holding company controlled by private equity firm Oak Hill Capital Partners, purchased the other eight stations on December 22; WHBQ-TV was not included in the sale as Local TV already owned CBS affiliate WREG-TV—FCC rules prohibited duopolies between two of the four highest-rated television stations in a media market, and the station remained owned by Fox Television Stations.

=== Trade to Cox Media Group ===
On June 24, 2014, Fox Television Stations announced that it would trade WHBQ-TV and Boston sister station WFXT to the Cox Media Group in exchange for acquiring Cox's San Francisco duopoly of Fox affiliate KTVU and independent station KICU-TV. WHBQ remains a Fox affiliate through a long-term affiliation agreement with the network. The trade was completed on October 8, 2014.

In February 2019, it was announced that Apollo Global Management would acquire Cox Media Group and Northwest Broadcasting's stations. Although the group planned to operate under the name Terrier Media, it was later announced in June 2019 that Apollo would also acquire Cox's radio and advertising businesses, and retain the Cox Media Group name. The sale was completed on December 17, 2019.

=== Imagicomm, Rincon and Standard Media ownership ===
On March 29, 2022, Cox Media Group announced it would sell WHBQ-TV and 17 other stations to Imagicomm Communications, an affiliate of the parent company of the INSP cable channel, for $488 million; the sale was completed on August 1. On April 3, 2025, Imagicomm announced that it would sell seven stations, including WHBQ-TV, to Todd Parkin's Rincon Broadcasting Group; the deal was consummated on July 18.

In March 2026, Community News Media LLC, which operates as Standard Media Group and is led by Soohyung Kim with Deborah McDermott as chief executive, agreed to acquire Rincon Broadcasting's stations, including WHBQ-TV, for $116.5 million; the sale was completed on October 1.

== Programming ==
=== Past programming preemptions and deferrals ===
Despite being one of ABC's stronger affiliates during the 1960s and 1970s, WHBQ-TV often did not air some ABC programs in pattern, particularly those on the network's daytime lineup. Many of these programs were preempted outright or aired on a delay during the overnight hours. As with many southern and conservative markets, RKO General had to balance the network's programming with the rural and suburban audience surrounding Memphis, and its program director, Lance Russell, programmed the station conservatively, preempting shows based on his own tastes. For example, it was one of several ABC affiliates that did not clear Hot l Baltimore, which featured one of the first openly gay couples featured on American television, with Russell personally stating why the program would not be seen before leading into WHBQ's replacement programming. In September 1977, WHBQ-TV was one of eight ABC affiliates that refused to carry the controversial sitcom Soap, replacing it with repeats of My Three Sons. When Soap proved to be a runaway hit for the network, channel 13 and Russell acquiesced and allowed the series' summer reruns to air in late night, leading to it airing in its regular prime time slot from the start of the 1978–79 television season.

Other preemptions of the ABC schedule were more driven by the lure of local advertising revenue for an entire time slot, rather than content. For instance, in 1972, WHBQ-TV (whose AM sister was a Top 40 powerhouse at the time) dropped American Bandstand (and, with it, weaker and low-rated cartoons that aired in the 11 a.m. slot; the ABC Weekend Special, which took that spot in 1977, would not be cleared until 1980, along with portions of ABC's Wide World of Sports) in favor of airing a 90-minute live professional wrestling program from the Continental Wrestling Association circuit, hosted by Russell, that was previously a fixture on late Saturday afternoons when it first premiered in 1958, until it moved to the Saturday 11 a.m. to 12:30 p.m. slot. While that program moved to WMC-TV in 1977, channel 13 continued to preempt Bandstand until 1984, three years before ABC canceled the long-running series. The preemption kept Memphians from seeing homegrown talent perform on the show, such as The Sylvers, Al Green, Isaac Hayes, Anita Ward, The Staple Singers, and even WHBQ radio's own Rick Dees, who was hired as the station's new morning host during his "Disco Duck" days in late 1976; that song failed to garner any airplay on any of the radio stations in Memphis, including WHBQ-AM, because Dees was still employed at rival WMPS (then at 680 AM) at the time.

Channel 13 made up for the preemption by airing Bandstand's syndicated rival, Soul Train, on Saturday nights until independent station WPTY-TV purchased the local rights to that program in 1983. It was one of the largest ABC affiliates to decline to air AM America when it debuted in 1975 and the station also initially did not clear its successor Good Morning America; the latter program would not air on the station until 1977, initially for only an hour, and only when it proved to be at ratings parity nationally with Today. Other popular shows that WHBQ-TV held out until later (when they became major out-of-the-box hits on ABC) included Dark Shadows (which featured actor Don Briscoe, who would later reside and died in Memphis), S.W.A.T., Kids Are People Too, and The Bionic Woman. In 1980, the station was criticized for carrying paid religious programming instead of ABC's coverage of the United States men's hockey team's gold medal victory over Finland in the 1980 Winter Olympics in Lake Placid, New York.

Locally, the station had a rivalry with WREC/WREG-TV over bragging rights for the largest movie library in the market. Through its ownership by RKO General, channel 13 had rights to the entire RKO Pictures film catalog. The station's reliance on classic and public domain films during the 1960s and 1970s was evidenced in its daily noon to 2 p.m. airing of RKO General's Million Dollar Movie franchise (and later, the 9–11 a.m. airing of Dialing for Dollars), which the station ran instead of popular daytime soap operas All My Children and Ryan's Hope, or in some cases, reruns of ABC prime time sitcoms that aired in the late morning hours. In September 1978, channel 13 finally began clearing the full ABC daytime lineup, though until its ABC affiliation ended, All My Children aired in the morning on a one-day delay due to its noontime newscast.

=== Local programming ===
On September 29, 1962, WHBQ-TV premiered Fantastic Features, a showcase of classic horror films from the RKO Pictures library. The series was hosted by a Transylvanian-styled vampire named Sivad, played by Watson Davis. The show's opening sequence, which included film footage of Sivad riding through a misty forest in a horse-drawn hearse (filmed at Overton Park), proved so unsettling to some children that the series was moved from its original 6 p.m. timeslot on Saturdays to 10:30 p.m. At the height of its popularity, Fantastic Features aired on both Friday and Saturday nights. The program ended on February 5, 1972, after 623 episodes (although the final two years reran older films as the station was receiving more raunchier horror films whose content Davis did not feel comfortable airing and wanted the show to remain family-friendly), though Sivad has remained a well-remembered local personality. There were several attempts to resurrect the character, though a retired Watson Davis refused all offers, the sole exception being promos for the syndicated run of Dark Shadows, when it was acquired by WHBQ in April 1982. Davis died on May 23, 2005, and was buried in Monroe County, Arkansas.

During the 1960s and 1970s, WHBQ produced several local programs featuring local personalities. Disc jockey George Klein hosted Talent Party, an afternoon rock-and-roll series aimed at Memphis' teenage audience, and gave many garage bands their first television appearances; Talent Party was very successful, with ratings that were so high that it regularly beat the nationally top-rated CBS soap opera The Edge of Night on WREC/WREG.

Two other WHBQ programming staples were Happy Hal's Funhouse and Cartoon Time, hosted by Hal Miller. While he hosted both children's programs twice daily and on Saturday mornings (doing so from 1957 to 1974), it also provided Miller with the opportunity to sell toy products from his local toy store during his telecasts. Another children's show that aired on WHBQ from 1955 to 1957 was Mars Patrol, which featured a young Wink Martindale who presented segments of Flash Gordon film serials and interviewed local school children seated in a mock 'spaceship'. Martindale later became a popular television game show host.

During the 1970s and early 1980s, news anchor Marge Thrasher hosted a local talk show titled Straight Talk (a title used on other RKO General stations), that aired at 8 a.m. on weekdays. WHBQ was also the Memphis broadcaster of the hybrid local/syndicated program PM Magazine featuring Byron Day and Linn Sitler.

=== News operation ===
WHBQ-TV presently broadcasts 49 1/2 hours of locally produced newscasts each week (with nine hours each weekday, two hours on Saturdays and 2 1/2 hours on Sundays); in regards to the number of hours devoted to news programming, it is the highest local newscast output of any television station in both the Memphis market and the state of Tennessee. As is standard with Fox stations that carry early evening weekend newscasts, WHBQ's Saturday and Sunday 5 p.m. newscasts are subject to preemption due to network sports telecasts that are scheduled to overlap into the timeslot. WHBQ was one of four Fox O&Os to air a 5 p.m. newscast, but not a 6 p.m. newscast – along with Austin's KTBC, Houston's KRIV and Minneapolis' KMSP-TV (the network's Boston O&O WFXT was included in this distinction until September 2009, when the reverse became true after the station "moved" its 5 p.m. newscast to 6 p.m.; WFXT restored a 5 p.m. newscast in September 2013).

WHBQ's newscasts, for many years, had been branded as Eyewitness News and stayed true to that format's element of including casual banter between anchors and reporters, along with using the "Cool Hand Luke" music package that was used by ABC's owned-and-operated stations. WHBQ had a number of highly visible anchors and reporters during the 1970s and 1980s, including Ed Craig, Tom Bearden, Marge Thrasher, Fran Fawcett, Jim Jaggers and Charlie B. Watson. After Fox acquired the station in 1995, the station expanded its newscasts: its weekday morning newscast expanded from one hour to three, with the addition of a two-hour block from 7 to 9 a.m., the 6 p.m. newscast was removed in favor of expanding the 5 p.m. news to one hour, and the late evening newscast was moved from 10 to 9 p.m. and expanded to one hour. The newscasts were also briefly retitled Fox 13 Eyewitness News, before the title was truncated to Fox 13 News in 1997. The station continues to have their anchors and reporters banter about stories to the present day, despite otherwise abandoning the Eyewitness News branding and elements.

On June 23, 2009, WHBQ-TV became the second television station in Memphis (behind WMC-TV) to begin broadcasting its local newscasts in high definition. On September 7, 2009, the station's weekday morning newscast Good Morning Memphis was expanded to five hours, with the addition of an hour-long block at 9 a.m.; an additional half-hour from 4:30 to 5 a.m. was added to the program on April 26, 2010. WHBQ restored a 10 p.m. newscast to its schedule on August 16, 2010, marking the first time since the December 1, 1995, affiliation switch that channel 13 has aired a late newscast in direct competition with WREG, WMC-TV and WPTY (now WATN-TV). On August 3, 2013, WHBQ launched a two-hour Saturday edition of Good Morning Memphis, airing from 6 to 8 a.m. On July 6, 2014, WHBQ expanded its weekend morning newscasts to Sundays, also airing from 6 to 8 a.m.

==== Notable former on-air staff ====
- David Lee – sports director (2001–2006)

== Technical information ==
=== Subchannels ===
The station's signal is multiplexed:

Subchannels of WHBQ-TV
Subchannel	Res.	Short name	Programming
13.1	720p	WHBQ-DT	Fox
13.2	480i	H & I	Heroes & Icons
13.3	480i	Mystery	Ion Mystery (4:3)
13.4	480i	ROAR	Roar

=== Analog-to-digital conversion ===
WHBQ-TV ended regular programming on its analog signal, over VHF channel 13, on June 12, 2009, as part of the federally mandated transition from analog to digital television. The station's digital signal relocated from its pre-transition UHF channel 53, which was among the high band UHF channels (52–69) that were removed from broadcasting use as a result of the transition, to its analog-era VHF channel 13 for post-transition operations.

== Out-of-market coverage ==
WHBQ-TV was the default Fox affiliate for the Jonesboro, Arkansas, media market before June 1, 2015, since Fox did not have a local outlet in that area. It was replaced with KJNB-LD when it launched on that date.

WHBQ was also carried in the Jackson, Tennessee, market before WJKT re-assumed the Fox affiliation in the fall of 2006.

== See also ==
- RKO Pictures
