= WREG-TV =

Television station in Memphis, Tennessee

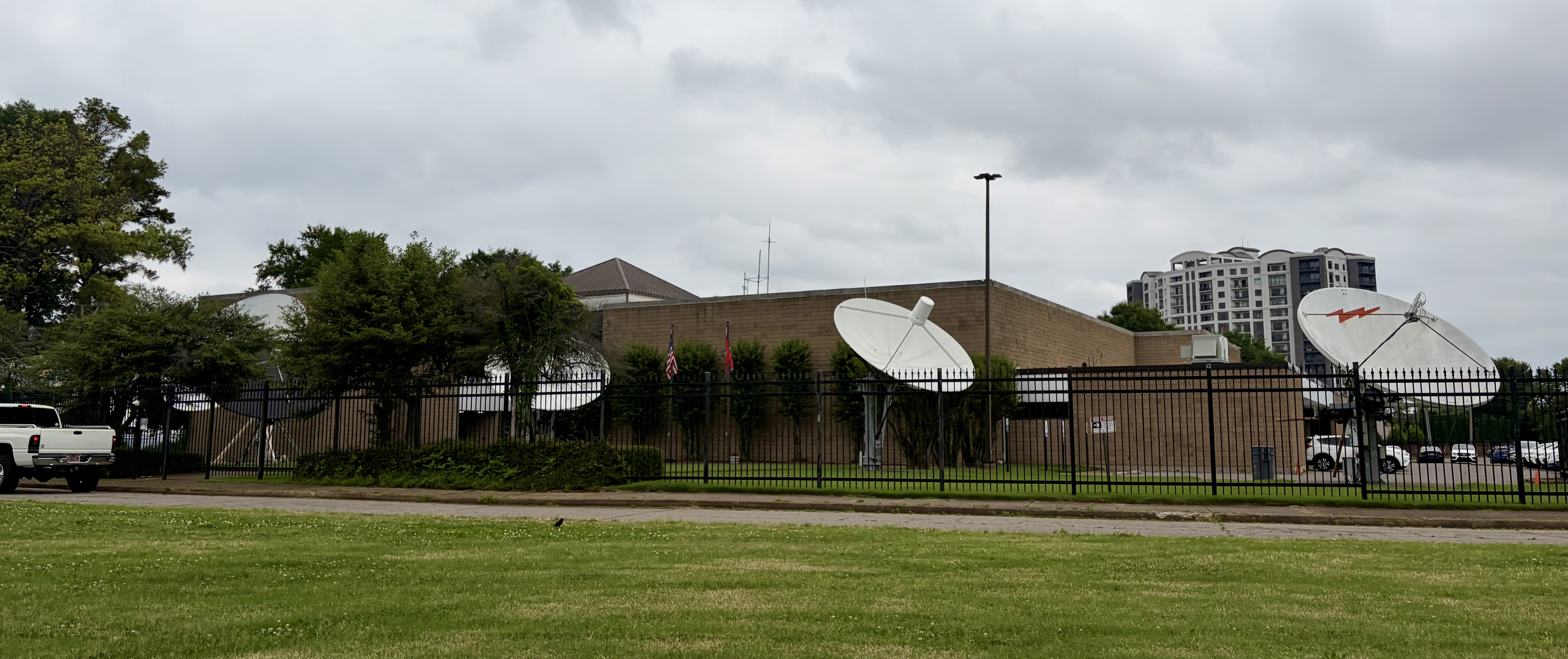
- The headquarters and broadcast facility for WREG Channel 3 in Memphis
- Memphis, Tennessee; United States
- Channels: Digital: 28 (UHF); Virtual: 3
- Branding: WREG News Channel 3

Programming
- Affiliations: 3.1: CBS; for others, see § Subchannels

Ownership
- Owner: Nexstar Media Group; (Tribune Broadcasting Company II LLC)
- Sister stations: Tegna: WATN-TV, WLMT

History
- First air date: January 1, 1956
- Former call signs: WREC-TV (1956–1975)
- Former channel number: Analog: 3 (VHF, 1956–2009)
- Call sign meaning: Variation of original calls, which stood for the Wooten Radio and Electric Company

Technical information
- Licensing authority: FCC
- Facility ID: 66174
- ERP: 906 kW
- HAAT: 313 m (1,027 ft)
- Transmitter coordinates: 35°10′52″N 89°49′56″W

Links
- Public license information: Public file; LMS
- Website: wreg.com

WREG-TV (channel 3) is a television station in Memphis, Tennessee, United States, affiliated with CBS. It is owned by Nexstar Media Group, whose Tegna subsidiary owns ABC affiliate WATN-TV (channel 24) and CW station WLMT (channel 30). WREG-TV's studios are located on Channel 3 Drive near the Mississippi River on the west side of Memphis, and its transmitter is located near Bartlett, Tennessee.

== History ==
The station first signed on the air on January 1, 1956, as WREC-TV, and began regular broadcasts the following day on January 2. It was originally owned by electrical engineer and radio dealer Hoyt Wooten (who had applied for one of the first television licenses in the country in 1928), along with WREC radio (600 AM and 102.7 FM, now WEGR). The call letters stood for Wooten's radio store, the Wooten Radio-Electric Company, where he had founded WREC radio in 1922. It took the CBS affiliation from WHBQ-TV (channel 13, which had been a CBS affiliate since it started in September 1953), as WREC-AM had been a CBS Radio affiliate since 1929. WREC-TV's original studios were located inside the Peabody Hotel, a noted tourist attraction, in downtown Memphis.

For its first six years, WREC-TV was the only locally owned station in Memphis (WHBQ-TV was owned by General Tire and NBC affiliate WMC-TV was owned by Scripps-Howard). However, in 1963, Wooten sold WREC-AM-FM-TV to Cowles Communications, earning a handsome return on his original investment of 40 years earlier. In turn, Cowles sold WREC-TV to The New York Times Company in 1971, marking their first foray into television broadcasting outside of its home city in New York City. Cowles later sold the radio stations to other interests.

Four years later, the Times Company built new studio facilities for WREG on one of the highest points on Chickasaw Bluff, overlooking the Mississippi River. The station had long since outgrown the Peabody Hotel, and management felt that building a new studio near the Mississippi would be appropriate since Memphis has long been identified with the river. On March 2, 1975, channel 3 signed off from the Peabody Hotel for the last time, and returned to the air 45 minutes later from the new studios on Channel 3 Drive. The move also saw the station slightly modify its call sign to WREG-TV. Years later, the station also maintained studio space in the Peabody Place shopping center, adjacent to the Peabody Hotel, marking a partial return of sorts to the WREC-TV years. However, the studio was shut down in 2011 when Peabody Place closed.

On September 12, 2006, The New York Times Company announced its intention to sell its nine television stations. On January 4, 2007, the company entered into an agreement with private equity group Oak Hill Capital Partners to sell the stations to the Oak Hill-operated holding company Local TV, the sale was finalized on May 7. On July 1, 2013, Local TV announced that it would sell its stations to Tribune Broadcasting (which formed a management company that operated both Tribune and Local TV's stations in 2008) for $2.75 billion. The sale was completed on December 27.

=== Aborted sale to Sinclair; sale to Nexstar ===
Sinclair Broadcast Group entered into an agreement to acquire Tribune Media on May 8, 2017, for $3.9 billion, plus the assumption of $2.7 billion in Tribune debt. The deal received significant scrutiny over Sinclair's forthrightness in its applications to sell certain conflict properties, prompting the FCC to designate it for hearing and leading Tribune to terminate the deal and sue Sinclair for breach of contract.

Following the Sinclair deal's collapse, Nexstar Media Group of Irving, Texas, announced its purchase of Tribune Media on December 3, 2018, for $6.4 billion in cash and debt. As Nexstar already owned ABC affiliate WATN-TV (channel 24) and CW affiliate WLMT (channel 30), the company agreed on March 20, 2019, to divest the WATN/WLMT duopoly to Tegna Inc. as part of a series of transactions with multiple companies that totaled $1.32 billion. The sale was completed on September 19, 2019.

Nexstar acquired Tegna for $6.2 billion in a deal announced in August 2025 and completed on March 19, 2026. The deal included approval for Nexstar to own three full-power station licenses in markets such as Memphis. A temporary restraining order issued one week later by the U.S. District Court for the Eastern District of California, later escalated to a preliminary injunction, has prevented Nexstar from integrating the stations.

== Programming ==
From its September 1997 debut until December 2024, WREG preempted CBS Saturday Morning in order to air a three-hour Saturday morning newscast in its place. WREG preempts the Sunday edition of the CBS Weekend News in order to air an hour-long 5 p.m. newscast. It is one of the few stations that preempt a big three network evening newscast (the hour-long early evening newscast inventories of Norfolk NBC affiliate WAVY-TV and Grand Rapids NBC affiliate WOOD-TV, sister stations of WREG, are also limited in a similar fashion). Over the years, WREG has produced many local programs, such as News Channel 3 Knowledge Bowl and Mid-South Outdoors (later known as News Channel 3 Outdoors). The station also currently produces Live at 9, a weekday morning program that maintains a talk show-style format and the public affairs program Informed Sources, which airs on Saturday evenings and sometimes Sunday nights and discusses current local issues.

Throughout the early 1960s into the late 1980s, WREC/WREG claimed to possess the largest feature film library of any television station in the United States, which was evidenced in its daily (late afternoons and late nights) and weekend programming lineup at the time. The station used some of those features for theme weeks (such as "Godzilla Week" and "John Wayne Week"), which proved to be very popular with viewers. However, like most major network affiliates in the early 1980s, WREG-TV began cutting back on the large number of movies that occupied much of its off-network schedule, a move prompted by the presence of cable, VCRs, and the emergence of then-independent competitors WPTY (channel 24, now ABC affiliate WATN-TV) in 1978 and WMKW (channel 30, now CW affiliate WLMT) in 1983.

=== News operation ===
The station presently broadcasts 43 hours of locally produced newscasts each week (with seven hours each weekday, 4 1/2 hours on Saturdays and 3 1/2 hours on Sundays).

On June 13, 2011, beginning with the 10 p.m. newscast, WREG-TV became the third station in the Memphis market (behind WMC-TV and WHBQ-TV) to begin broadcasting its local newscasts in high definition. The switch came with a refresh of the newsroom set and new graphics, however major technical glitches occurred during the week following the conversion. In mid-2011, the WREG news studio received a major overhaul with the unveiling of a "newsplex" set (designed by FX Group) that occupies a large studio with loft areas and continues into a smaller newsroom area in the back and includes numerous live areas and a set for the Live at 9 program.

== Technical information ==
=== Subchannels ===
The station's signal is multiplexed:

Subchannels of WREG-TV
Subchannel	Res.	Short name	Programming
3.1	1080i	WREG-DT	CBS
3.2	480i	NC3A	News Channel 3 Anytime
3.3	480i	AntenTV	Antenna TV (4:3)
3.4	480i	MVSGLD	MovieSphere Gold

The station became a charter affiliate of Antenna TV upon its launch on January 1, 2011.

=== Analog-to-digital conversion ===
WREG-TV ended regular programming on its analog signal, over VHF channel 3, on June 12, 2009, as part of the federally mandated transition from analog to digital television. The station's digital signal remained on its pre-transition UHF channel 28, using virtual channel 3.

== Out-of-market coverage ==
WREG-TV, along with Little Rock's KTHV, previously served as the default CBS affiliates for the Jonesboro, Arkansas, area. WREG's signal can reach at least the Jonesboro area, and it is available on Suddenlink cable, as well as the cable system of Paragould Light Water and Cable in the Paragould area. This ended on August 1, 2015, when Jonesboro-based Fox affiliate KJNB-LD signed on the Jonesboro market's first locally based CBS affiliate on its second digital subchannel. This has resulted in the displacement of KTHV from Suddenlink cable, and may also result in the removal of WREG-TV.

WREG-TV also previously served as the default CBS affiliate for the Jackson, Tennessee, media market, along with Nashville's WTVF. This ended on January 1, 2012, when ABC affiliate WBBJ-TV converted its third subchannel into a primary CBS affiliate and secondary MeTV affiliate for that area. In spite of this, both WREG and WTVF remain on Jackson Energy Authority's E-Plus Broadband Cable system.
