= Brunswick, Tennessee =

- Unincorporated community
- Location within Tennessee Location within the United States
- Coordinates: 35°16′02″N 89°46′07″W
- Country: United States
- State: Tennessee
- County: Shelby
- Elevation: 259 ft (79 m)

Population
  - Total: 40,430
- Time zone: UTC-6 (Central (CST))
  - Summer (DST): UTC-5 (CDT)
- ZIP code: 38002, 38014
- Area code: 901
- GNIS feature ID: 1278669

Brunswick is an unincorporated community in Shelby County, Tennessee, United States. Brunswick is 7.5 miles (12.1 km) northeast of the center of Bartlett. Since the town is unincorporated, the boundaries are not officially defined, but it is roughly bounded by the Loosahatchie River to the north, Oliver Creek on the east, U.S. Route 70 to the south, and Germantown Road/Craven Road to the west. Initially, Brunswick was a separate community that formed along the Louisville and Nashville Railroad (now owned by CSX Transportation). Many of the same families have lived in Brunswick for multiple generations. Many of these families are buried in Pleasant Hill Cemetery on Brunswick Road, between the railroad tracks and U.S. Route 70.

Until recently, Brunswick was relatively isolated and rural compared with the rest of Shelby County. In the 2000s, new subdivisions were built in the area.

== Annexation ==
The area of Brunswick is located within the Bartlett annexation reserve. In September 2012, the city of Bartlett announced it would likely annex the area south of the CSX railroad by December, and did so by early 2013. The portion just east of the Brunswick area and Oliver Creek is within the city limits of Lakeland. This leaves the only unannexed portion of Brunswick the area north of the CSX tracks.
