= TVX Broadcast Group =

American media company

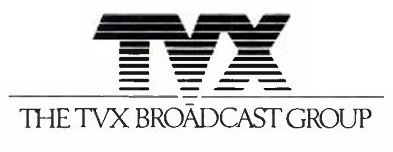
- Formerly: Television Corporation of Virginia (1976-1982); Television Corporation Stations (1982-1984)
- Type: Public
- Industry: Broadcast television
- Founded: 1979; 47 years ago
- Defunct: 1991; 35 years ago
- Fate: Acquired by Paramount Pictures in 1991 and became Paramount Stations Group
- Successor: Paramount Stations Group
- Headquarters: Norfolk, Virginia, U.S.
- Area served: United States
- Key people: Gene Loving, co-founder and chairman; Timothy McDonald, co-founder and chairman; John Trinder, founder and CEO (1988–1991)
- Products: Broadcast television

TVX Broadcast Group was an American media company that owned a group of mostly UHF television stations during the 1980s and early 1990s.

It was established by local investors as the Television Corporation of Virginia in 1976, which built WTVZ-TV in Norfolk, Virginia in 1979. The group soon became Television Corporation Stations in 1982—though abbreviated TVX—and adopted its final name in 1984. TVX built or acquired additional independent stations in mid-sized markets, primarily in the southern United States, between 1980 and 1987; it became known for its cost-conscious and cookie-cutter philosophy toward station management, particularly its standard station employment plan with exactly 37 employees.

While TVX always envisioned entering larger markets, the acquisition of five major-market independent stations from Taft Broadcasting in 1986 proved to be its eventual downfall. TVX incurred substantial debt in the purchase just as the independent station market soured and investors shied away from its junk bonds. The firm struggled to recapitalize and soon was shedding most of the stations it had built in medium markets. Gulf and Western Industries, the corporate parent of Paramount Pictures, acquired 79 percent of the company from Salomon Brothers in 1989. TVX became wholly owned by Paramount in 1991 and became Paramount Stations Group.

== History ==
=== Early years ===
In 1976, the Television Corporation of Virginia was formed in response to what its backers perceived as the need for another television station in the Norfolk area. Armed with an agreement to share the tower of public television station WHRO-TV, the group applied to the Federal Communications Commission (FCC) and received a construction permit for WTVZ-TV in June 1978. Two FCC commissioners dissented from the award because some of the investors in TVX—including Martha Davis, wife of future Virginia lieutenant governor Dick Davis—had holdings in Norfolk AM and FM radio stations; Television Corporation successfully argued that the addition of a new UHF station, first minority ownership of a local TV station, and integration of ownership and management outweighed these concerns. It also pointed to the fact that other attempts at commercial UHF television in Hampton Roads had failed economically.

The investors, including market broadcast veteran Gene Loving, secured the services of John A. Trinder, general sales manager at CBS affiliate WTAR-TV, and Tim McDonald, who had last been programming Washington independent WTTG, to help run the new WTVZ. McDonald required six months of coaxing to be lured away from Washington. He only agreed to join WTVZ in the smaller Norfolk market because he was made president and general manager and the investors were willing to expand beyond one station. The station aimed to offer counterprogramming to the existing network affiliates, reach the children's market (which Trinder and McDonald felt was underserved), and provide facilities for local commercial production.

WTVZ-TV began broadcasting on September 24, 1979, featuring a general-entertainment mix including movies, sitcoms, cartoons, and sports, designed to provide an alternative to the existing stations in the Norfolk area. The new station quickly made an impact in the market, claiming nine percent total-day share within a year of going on the air and buoyed by the market's large young male population. Where the general manager of a local network affiliate had once declared to Trinder, "We will bury you", sitcom reruns helped the station rise to number two in the valuable early fringe hours opposite the network affiliates. It took just seven months for WTVZ to turn a profit, quickly leaving behind the early days when, Trinder recalled, "we made payroll by going to the bank and trading auto titles for cash".

=== Southern expansion ===
The Television Corporation investors wasted little time branching out into new markets. In 1980, they purchased WGNN-TV, a small Christian television station in Winston-Salem, North Carolina, and rebuilt it as WJTM-TV (representing John Trinder and Tim McDonald in its call letters). Television Corporation of Virginia then also purchased the construction permit for a new independent station in Richmond, Virginia, and put WRLH-TV on the air in February 1982. A year after starting up, it already accounted for eight percent of the total TV audience in Richmond. TVX continued to add one new station a year, building WMKW-TV in Memphis in 1983 and WCAY-TV in Nashville in 1984.

In expanding, TVX sought situations where novice broadcasters had gotten in over their heads and wanted to sell in Sun Belt cities predicted to have growing markets. Each new station put on the air was modeled after WTVZ, where bookshelves had been scrounged up at pawn shops and other furnishings were obtained in trade-out deals for advertising. Each station had 37 employees—McDonald told Channels magazine in 1986 that "we've found over the years that that's how many we need"—and generally aired a similar mix of programming, with little local programming and more sports than the average independent. This strategy earned TVX derisive nicknames in a business known for a glamorous image: a 1986 feature article on the company was titled "McStations", and it was also dubbed the "Kmart of broadcasting".

Despite this activity and a surge in revenues from $2 million in 1980 to $14 million in 1985, TVX remained an unprofitable company because of increasing programming costs and leveraged acquisitions. To clear the company's bank debt, TVX sold WRLH-TV in 1985 to A. S. Abell Company, then-publisher of the Baltimore Sun, then went public as an over-the-counter stock raising $19.8 million from the sale of two million shares. The cash was used on a buying spree of stations: two in operation (WNOL-TV in New Orleans and WLFL in Raleigh, North Carolina) and two unbuilt stations in Pine Bluff/Little Rock, Arkansas (signed on in 1986 as KJTM-TV), Buffalo, New York (the permit for WNYB-TV), plus 49 percent of KRRT in the San Antonio market. (The Winston-Salem station was sold in order to acquire the Raleigh station, as their signals overlapped.) The acquisition of WNOL typified TVX's cost-cutting ways. WNOL-TV had been put on the air in 1983 by a group that was losing money; TVX renegotiated programming contracts and cut such niceties as covered parking for station executives. The eight TVX stations owned at this time all became charter affiliates of the Fox network, which initially only provided late night and weekend prime time programming, in October 1986. Many of TVX's independents led their markets, though some faced much stiffer competition, most notably New Orleans and Nashville.

Two additional attempts at expansion were unsuccessful. TVX filed for channel 42 in Austin, Texas, but wound up accepting a settlement with three other companies pursuing the channel in 1983; under the deal, the other three groups would combine to own the station, and TVX would serve as a consultant. The company also was the driving force behind a proposed distress purchase of WHCT in Hartford, Connecticut, in 1981; the troubled station was being sold by its licensee at a discount, and TVX joined forces with Herman Valentine, a Black employee of the company, and the Hispanic-owned East Los Angeles Community Union in order to qualify as a minority licensee under FCC distress sale rules. (Note: A distress sale was a type of sale permitted by the FCC of a station facing possible revocation of its broadcast license to a group that was minority-controlled. The sale had to be made at a price substantially below the station's market value.) TVX eventually backed out of the deal when the FCC began investigating the East Los Angeles Community Union for criminal misuse of funds; TVX investor Gene Loving told the Richmond Times-Dispatch that "[w]e made the decision we couldn't be in business with them".

=== Taft purchase ===
In November 1986, TVX agreed to pay $240 million to acquire five major-market independent stations from Taft Broadcasting. The stations were all in markets larger than the existing TVX portfolio: WTAF-TV in Philadelphia (renamed WTXF-TV in 1988); KTXA in Fort Worth, Texas; KTXH in Houston; WDCA-TV in Washington, D.C.; and WCIX in Miami. TVX officially closed on the deal on April 9, 1987.

The larger-market independents presented a puzzle for TVX's business model. Two of them—WTAF and WCIX—produced local 10 p.m. newscasts, something with which the company had no experience. Most of them, with the exception of WTAF, were doing rather poorly. The addition of five more stations to the portfolio also left TVX needing to divest itself of one station. It chose the still-unbuilt WNYB-TV in Buffalo, New York. After a deal to sell the station to Malcolm Glazer fell through, the company successfully approached the owners of the Buffalo Sabres hockey team, who were approved and put the station on the air in September 1987.

TVX took on debt to make the purchase. TVX's bankers, Salomon Brothers, provided the financing for the acquisition and in return held more than 60 percent of the company. The company was to pay Salomon Brothers $200 million on January 1, 1988, and missed the first payment deadline, having been unable to lure investors to its junk bonds even before the Black Monday stock market crash. TVX then recapitalized over the course of 1988 and 1989 by selling stations in many of its medium and small markets. In 1988, TVX sold its stations in Pine Bluff/Little Rock and Nashville; 1989 saw the sale of the company's holdings in Memphis, New Orleans, and Norfolk. Additionally, McDonald left TVX in May 1988 after five years and was replaced by Trinder as president.

TVX sold another station under very different circumstances. Miami's WCIX had become, from the moment Taft put it on the market in 1986, a major player in a brewing affiliation drama in the Miami area. CBS, which was seeking to buy stations, inquired as to purchasing the station and leaving longtime affiliate WTVJ; that caused a buyer for WTVJ, also on the market, to withdraw from the deal. CBS continued to negotiate with Taft, and the original purchase agreement between Taft and TVX allowed Taft to continue negotiating to sell the Miami station to CBS for 10 days after being announced. However, CBS ultimately walked away because it feared that the Miami station, whose signal had technical deficiencies in several populated areas of the market, would bring down network ratings.

In January 1987, NBC instead acquired WTVJ. When the owner of the outgoing NBC affiliate in Miami, WSVN, reached an impasse in negotiations with CBS, CBS and Salomon Brothers began discussing a sale. CBS then purchased WCIX from TVX for $59 million; the station became the CBS affiliate in Miami on January 1, 1989, and CBS closed on the purchase two days later.

Despite the successful recapitalization, Salomon Brothers reached an agreement in principle in January 1989 for Paramount Pictures to acquire options to purchase the investment firm's majority stake. This deal was replaced in September with an outright purchase of 79 percent of TVX for $110 million. Another four percent stake was acquired from Citicorp the next year. In 1991, Paramount acquired the remainder of TVX, forming the Paramount Stations Group.

TVX and the Grant Broadcasting System were cited by Television Engineering editor Peter Caranicas and Variety writer John Lippman as among the highest-profile economic failures in late 1980s independent television.

== Stations owned by TVX ==
Notes:

- Two boldface asterisks appearing following a station's call letters (**) indicate a station that was built and signed on by TVX;
- Three boldface asterisks (***) indicate a station built by TVX but sold to another entity before it signed on.

Stations owned by TVX Broadcast Group
City of license / Market	Station	Channel	Years owned	Current status
Pine Bluff–Little Rock, AR	KJTM **	38	1986–1989	The CW affiliate KASN, owned by Mission Broadcasting (Note: Operated through an SSA by Nexstar Media Group.)
Washington, D.C.	WDCA	20	1987–1991	MyNetworkTV affiliate owned by Fox Television Stations
Miami–Fort Lauderdale, FL	WCIX	6	1987–1989	CBS owned-and-operated (O&O) WFOR-TV on channel 4
New Orleans, LA	WNOL-TV	38	1985–1989	The CW O&O (Nexstar Media Group)
Buffalo, NY	WNYB-TV **	49	***	MyNetworkTV affiliate WNYO-TV, owned by Sinclair Broadcast Group
Raleigh–Durham–Fayetteville, NC	WLFL	22	1985–1991	The CW affiliate owned by Sinclair Broadcast Group
Winston-Salem–Greensboro– High Point, NC	WNRW	45	1980–1987	ABC affiliate WXLV-TV, owned by Sinclair Broadcast Group
Philadelphia, PA	WTXF-TV	29	1987–1991	Fox owned-and-operated (O&O)
Memphis, TN	WMKW-TV **	30	1983–1989	The CW affiliate WLMT, owned by Tegna Inc.
Nashville, TN	WCAY-TV **	30	1984–1989	MyNetworkTV affiliate WUXP-TV, owned by Sinclair Broadcast Group
Fort Worth–Dallas, TX	KTXA	21	1987–1991	Independent station owned by CBS News and Stations
Houston, TX	KTXH	20	1987–1991	MyNetworkTV affiliate owned by Fox Television Stations
Kerrville–San Antonio, TX	KRRT **	35	1985–1991	Dabl affiliate KMYS, owned by Deerfield Media (Note: Operated through an SSA by Sinclair Broadcast Group.)
Norfolk–Portsmouth, VA	WTVZ-TV **	33	1979–1989	MyNetworkTV affiliate owned by Sinclair Broadcast Group
Richmond, VA	WRLH-TV **	35	1982–1985	Fox affiliate owned by Sinclair Broadcast Group

== See also ==
- Westinghouse Broadcasting
- ABC Owned Television Stations
