= Old Forest Arboretum of Overton Park =

Forest and arboretum in Tennessee, US

- U.S. Historic district – Contributing property
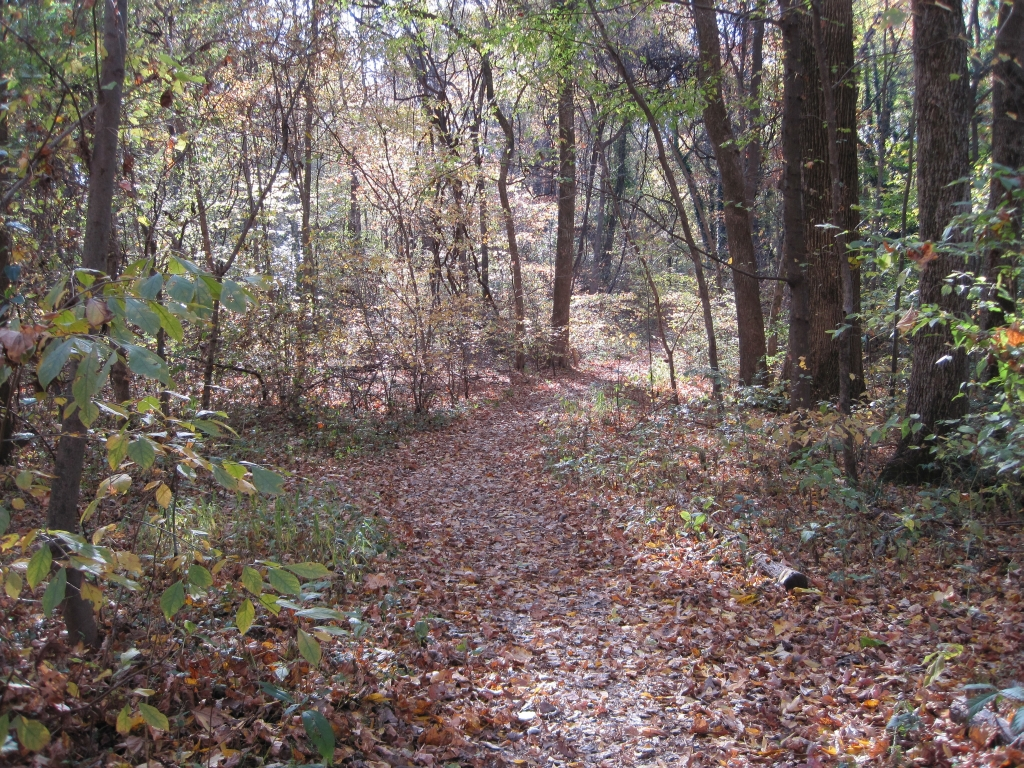
- The Old Forest Trail

- Location within Tennessee
- Location: Memphis, Tennessee
- Coordinates: 35°8′48″N 89°59′21″W
- Built: 1900
- Architect: Kessler, George E.
- Part of: Overton Park Historic District (ID79002475)
- Added to NRHP: October 25, 1979

The Old Forest Arboretum of Overton Park (172 acres) is a forest tract and natural arboretum located in Overton Park, Memphis, Tennessee. It is open to the public daily without charge. The forest was placed on the National Register of Historic Places in 1979 as part of the Overton Park Historic District. Tree identification began in 1997, with some 70 tree species identified by 2002 when it was certified as an arboretum. Today the arboretum contains walking trails with 49 tree markers identifying 32 species. Approximately three-fourths of the Arboretum was designated as the Old Forest State Natural Area in 2011.

== History ==
Conservation of the Old Forest began in 1901, when Overton Park was created when the 342 acres (1.38 km^{2}) Lea Woods was purchased by the City of Memphis. 172 acres (0.70 km^{2}) of its original climax oak-hickory cover was preserved as the Old Forest.

In 1912, the area was described as follows:

More than thirty kinds of native timber are found there. Rare wild plants, vines, grasses and flowers spring up in bewildering luxuriance and infinite variety to attract the scientist and lover of nature and where children can roam next to Mother Earth and her own immediate handiwork as in the days of our first parents.

Plant taxonomist Dr. Tom Heineke was hired by Memphis to inventory the Old Forest during 2008 and 2009. Large trees measured for possible inclusion as Tennessee Champion Trees included a 27-inch-diameter (690 mm) (DBH) black cherry, a 46-inch southern red oak, a 62-inch shumard oak, and 9-inch pawpaw. A total of 332 flowering plant species were recorded in 85 families; three-quarters of the species were native. Heineke's management recommendation was removal of evergreen exotic species, such as Chinese privet and Japanese honeysuckle, which are severely competing with native vegetation.

=== Tennessee State Natural Area status ===
On June 8, 2011, Governor Bill Haslam signed the Old Forest State Natural Area bill into law, designating 126 of the Arboretum's 172 acres as Tennessee's 82nd State Natural Area. The Natural Areas Program is run by the Tennessee Department of Environment and Conservation, while the natural areas themselves are often not TDEC property and are generally managed through cooperative agreements with other agencies and organizations. The bill creating the State Natural Area originally designated 142 acres for protection. To ease opposition from Memphis Mayor A C Wharton and Memphis Zoo officials, 14 acres of forest adjacent to the zoo were removed from the protective area.

=== Environmental threats ===
During the development of Interstate 40 through Memphis in the 1960s, 26 acres of the Old Forest were slated to be destroyed to make way for the new highway, which would have also severed the Memphis Zoo from the rest of Overton Park. A grassroots organization, the Citizens to Preserve Overton Park, rallied to protect the forest. In Citizens to Preserve Overton Park v. Volpe the U.S. Supreme Court finally saved the Old Forest from highway construction plans in 1971. In 1987, the Tennessee Department of Transportation deeded the 26-acre corridor back to the City of Memphis.

In 2008, the Memphis Zoo clear-cut 4 acres (16,000 m^{2}) to accommodate a new exhibit, Teton Trek. The destruction sparked the revival of CPOP to prevent further expansion of the zoo into the Old Forest.

== See also ==
- List of botanical gardens in the United States
