= Memphis Zoo =

Zoo in Memphis, USA

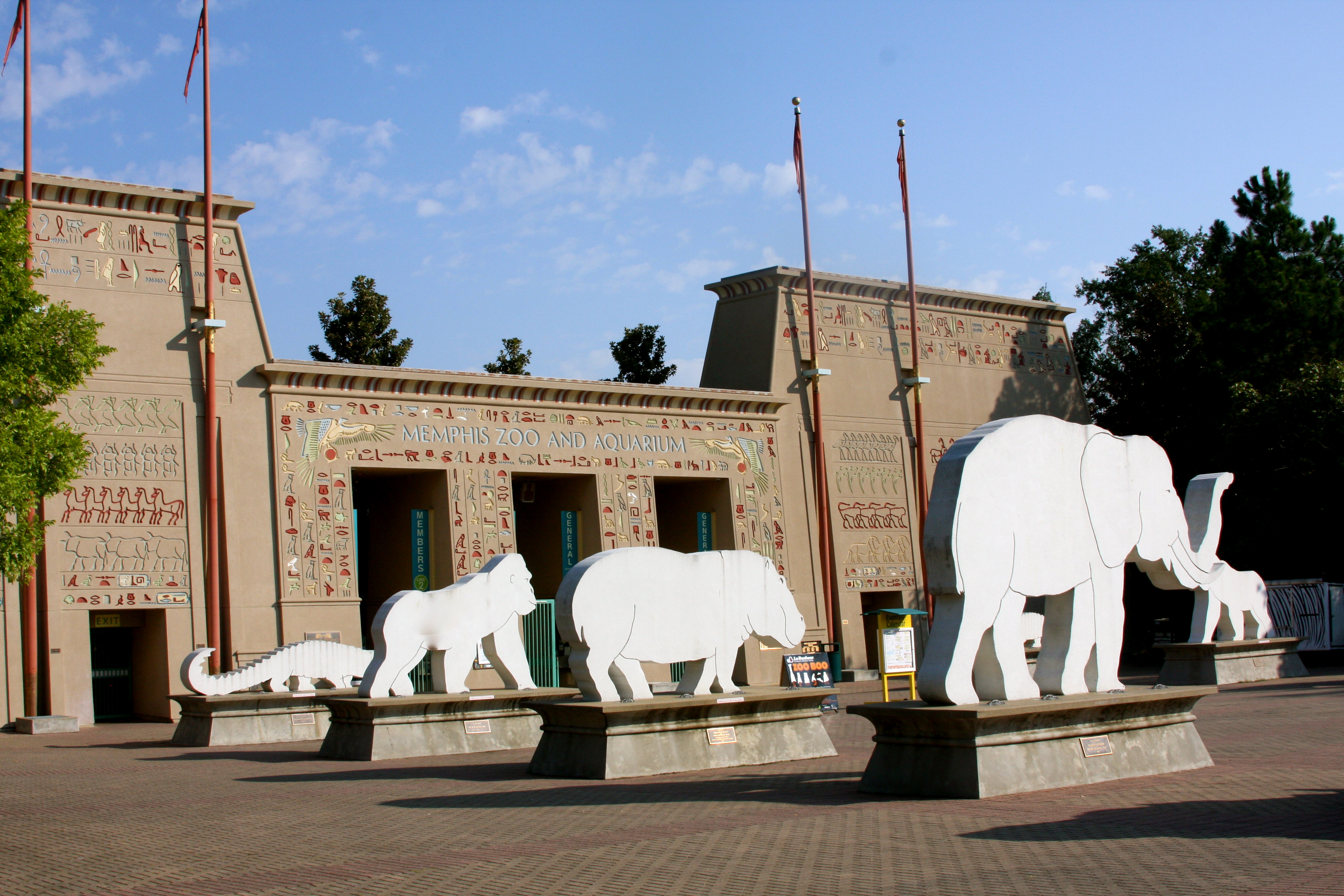
- Entrance gate at the Memphis Zoo
- Interactive map of Memphis Zoo
- 35.1500°N 89.9943°W
- Date opened: April 4, 1906
- Location: Memphis, Tennessee, United States
- Land area: 76 acres (31 ha)
- No. of animals: 3,500
- No. of species: 500
- Annual visitors: 1.2 million
- Memberships: AZA
- Major exhibits: 19 spread across 3 zones
- Public transit: MATA
- Website: www.memphiszoo.org

The Memphis Zoo is a zoo in Midtown, Memphis, Tennessee, United States. It is home to more than 3,500 animals representing over 500 different species. Created in April 1906, the zoo has been a major tenant of Overton Park for more than 100 years. The land currently designated to the Memphis Zoo was defined by the Overton Park master plan in 1888, it is owned by the City of Memphis. The zoo is set on 76 acres (31 ha), of which approximately 55 acres (22 ha) are developed.

In 2008, the Memphis Zoo was ranked "#1 Zoo in the U.S." by TripAdvisor. The ranking was based on visitor opinions.

Since the early 1990s, the Memphis Zoo has invested over $77 million for renovation and expansion. The zoo's animal inhabitants reside in three zones with 19 exhibits, such as Teton Trek, Northwest Passage and China.

The Memphis Zoo is an accredited member of the Association of Zoos and Aquariums (AZA).

== History ==
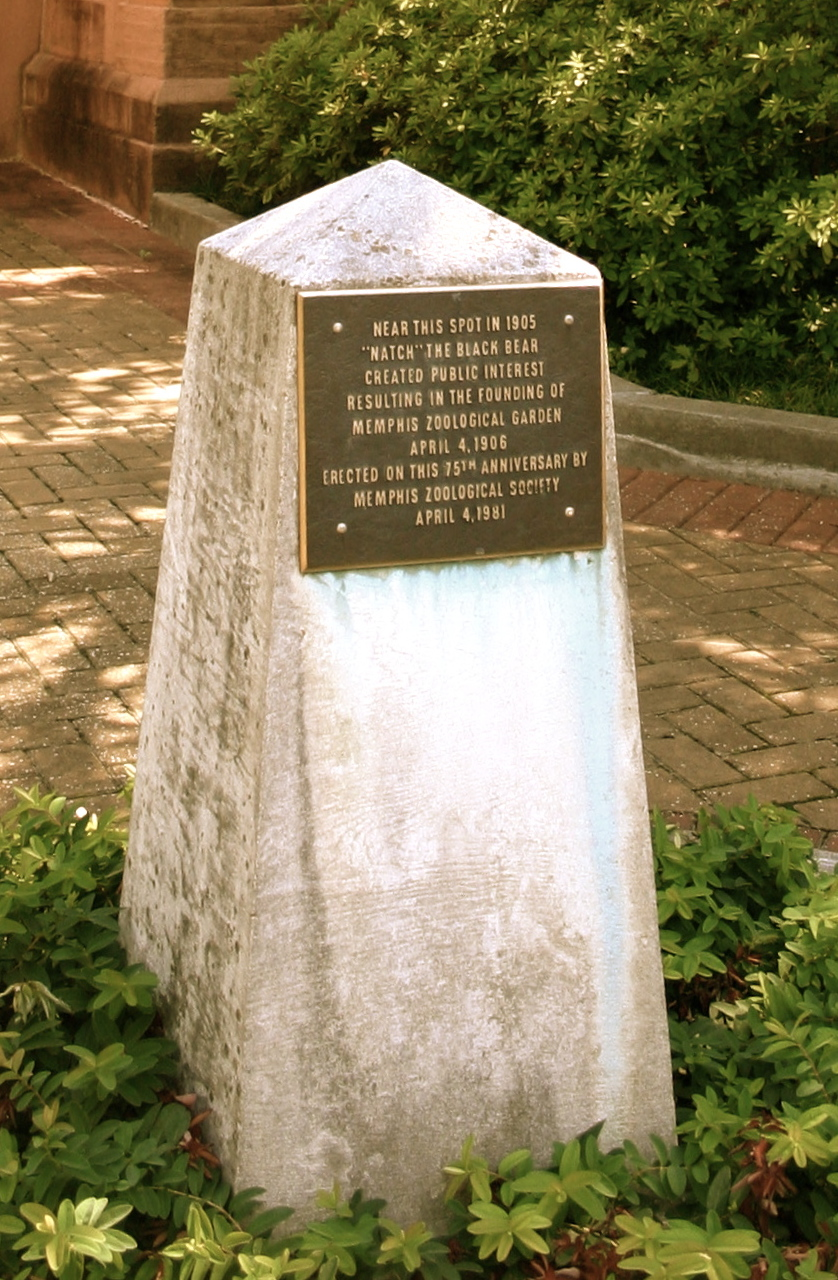
A marker where "Natch" the bear was chained in 1906. The old elephant building behind it is now the zoo's education library.

=== Early 1900s ===
The zoo was established on April 4, 1906, with $1,200 from the Memphis Park Commission. In August 1906, 23 cages and concrete bear enclosures were built with another $3,628 thanks to the head of the commission, Col. Robert Galloway.

Galloway Hall, the Memphis Zoo's first building, was finished in 1907. It was named in honor of Col. Galloway, but was later demolished to make room for newer exhibits.

The Carnivora Building was constructed in 1909 to house the first cats at the zoo. It was later replaced by Cat Country, and converted into an inner-zoo restaurant.

The Elephant House opened in 1910. The building is still used as the main building of the zoo's educational department, but the elephants were moved to the African Veldt exhibit.

In 1916, the Botanical Display Building opened. It was later converted into the Tropical Bird House.

The Memphis Zoo acquired a round barn from the Memphis Police Department in 1923, who used the building as their stable for the mounted horse patrol in the early 1900s. The zoo's round barn exhibit is a collection of exotic hoofstock and birds.

In 1936, the zoo's first primate exhibit, Monkey Island, was built. It was replaced in 1995 by Primate Canyon.

=== Mid-1900s ===
The Aquarium was completed in 1959. It is one of the oldest exhibits at the Memphis Zoo. The building houses aquatic life from both fresh and salt water environments. In 1979, it had major renovations.

The Herpetarium was constructed in 1960, located across from the Tropical Bird House. The Herpetarium is home to the zoo's snakes, alligators, lizards and frogs. Later in the year, the Pachyderm/Elephant exhibit was finished, and the elephants moved in from the old elephant house.

In December 1960, following continued pressure from local activists, Memphis Zoo would be racially desegregated.

=== Late 1900s to present ===
The zoo renovated its entrance in 1990. The main entrance way was designed by architect, Jeffery Borchardt. It was dubbed as the "Avenue of the Animals" which displays a grand Egyptian motif modeled after the Avenue of Sphinxes in Egypt. The zoo portal facade features a 40' by 163' wall with hieroglyphics of all the animals in the zoo. In the top panels, the Memphis Zoo Mission Statement is written in hieroglyphics.

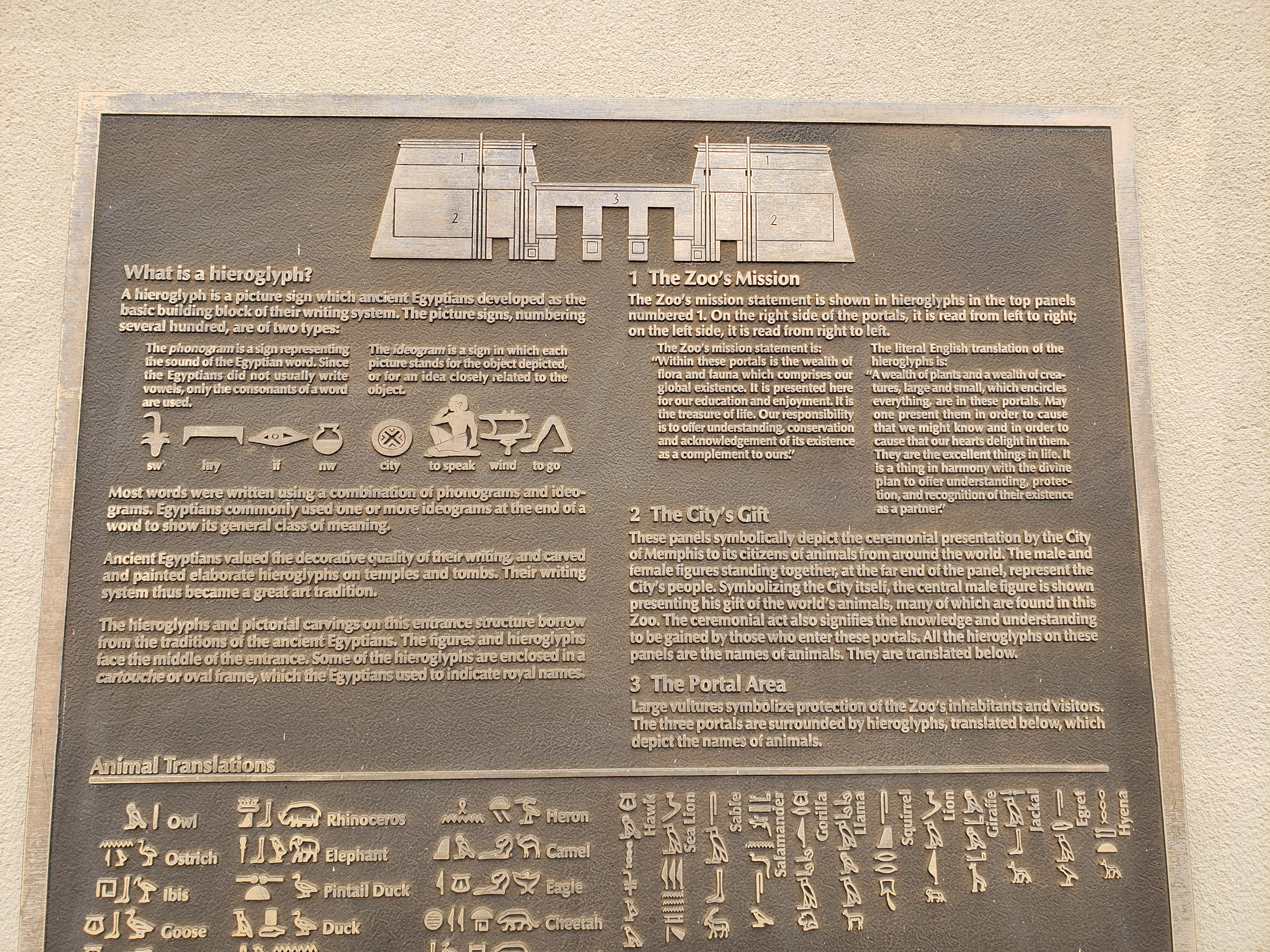
Memphis Zoo's "Avenue of the Animals"

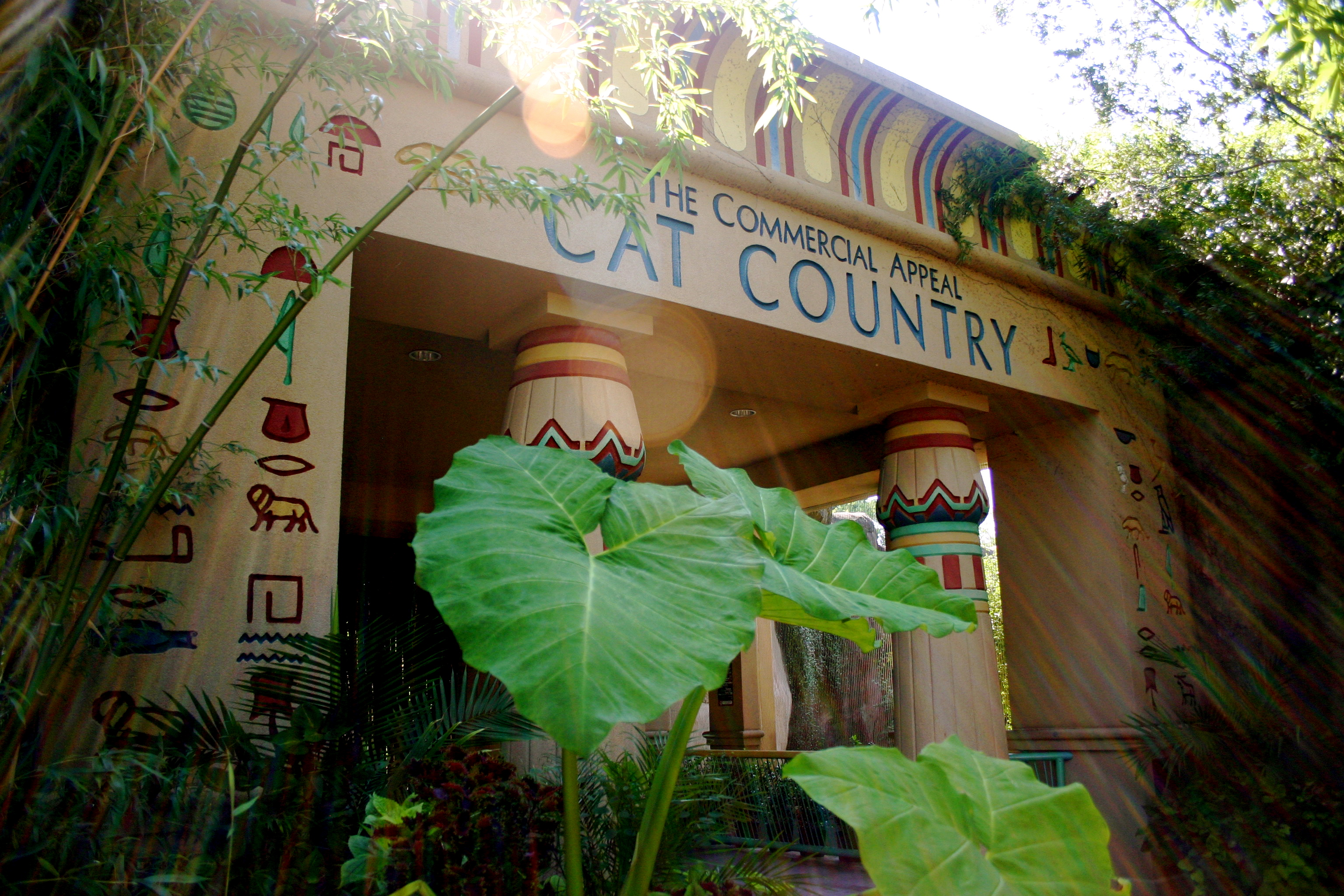
Cat Country exhibit

Cat Country, a 3-acre (1.2 ha), open-air exhibit focused on both predators and prey of the cat world, opened in 1993. Tigers and lions share common space with fennec foxes and meerkats. An Education Complex, Discovery Center, and the Elephant's Trunk Zoo Shop also opened at this time. The Carnivora Building that formerly housed the zoo's large cats was remodeled into The Cat House Cafe, which opened in 1994.

Three new exhibits opened in 1995. Animals of the Night is devoted to nocturnal animals, and reverses their hours from normal so visitors can see them at their most active. Once Upon A Farm was built to resemble an early 1900s farm. Primate Canyon features naturalistic, outdoor exhibit areas for a variety of monkeys and apes.

Dragon's Lair was opened in 1998 for the zoo's three Komodo dragons, and includes outdoor and indoor areas, allowing them to stay warm during the cool winter months. A new animal hospital was also finished in 1998, with separate holding and quarantine wings built on opposite ends of the building. The sick wing separates sick or injured animals from others and allows for proper recovery time. The quarantine wing is used for newly acquired animals, which are quarantined for at least 30 days upon arrival at the zoo before being introduced to their new homes. On September 18, 1998, two plaques were dedicated in memory of musician Jeff Buckley in the Memphis Zoo's Sumatran tiger exhibit. His mother chose that location because of his great love of the Memphis Zoo and the tigers in particular. Jeff frequently visited the zoo, had plans to become a volunteer in 1997 and, according to his mother, never left the zoo without visiting the Butterflies: In Living Color exhibit, which also opened early in 1998. The exhibit was replaced by "Birds and Bees" in late May 2009.

In April 2003, the Memphis Zoo became one of only four U.S. zoos to exhibit the giant panda as a part of a 20-year loan. One male and one female panda, Le Le and Ya Ya, shared their 3-acre (1.2 ha) home with several other species native to China, in the first Memphis Zoo exhibit to be built as a zoogeographical exhibit. The buildings, plant life and the sounds of China are represented in this $16 million exhibit. In February 2023, Le Le died a few months before the pandas were set to be returned to China, leading to concerns about the treatment the pandas were receiving in the zoo. In May 2023, Ya Ya was successfully sent back to China after the end of the loan agreement.

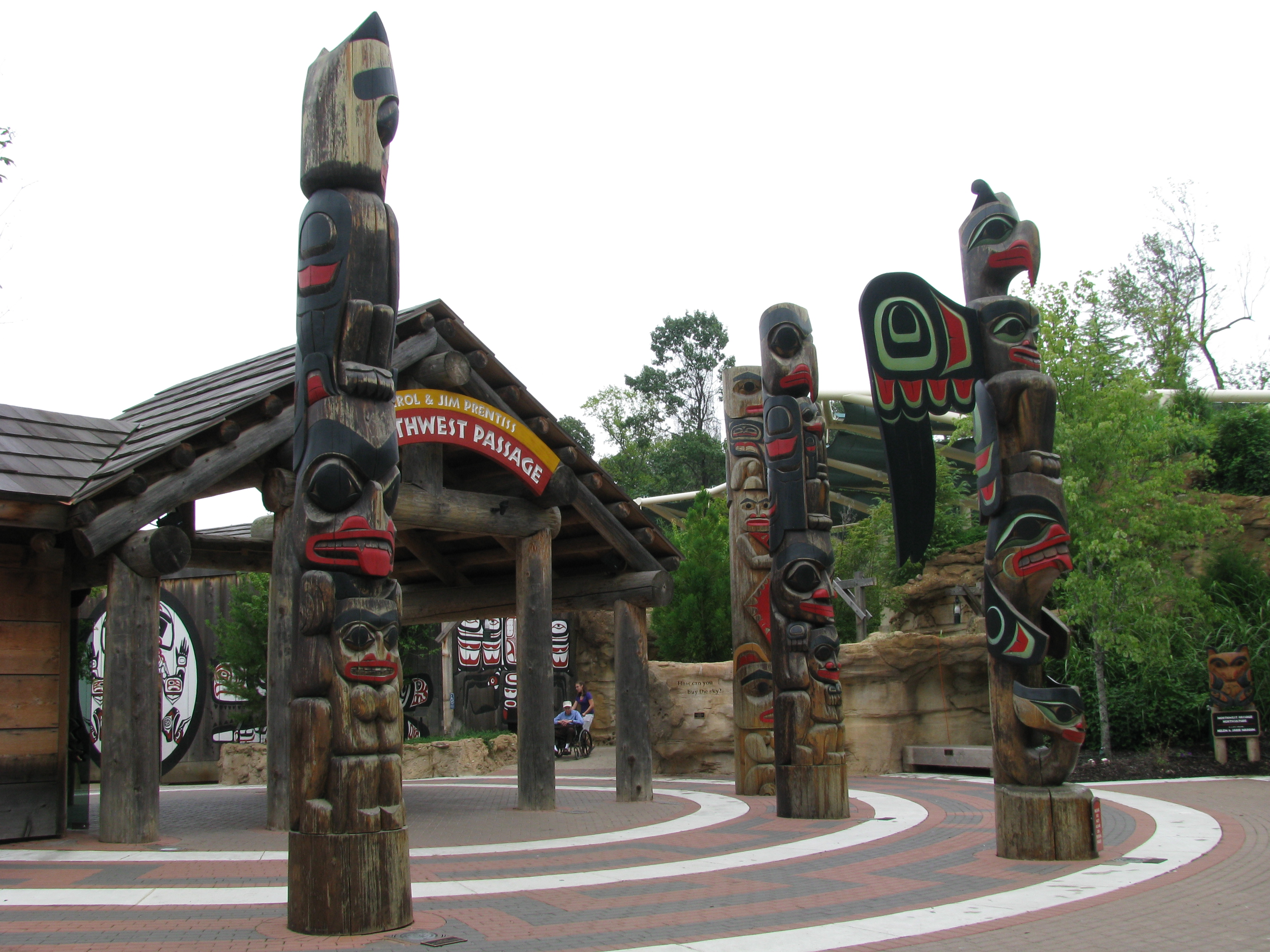
Northwest Passage exhibit

The Northwest Passage exhibit opened on March 1, 2006, with underwater viewing for polar bears and sea lions. The animals frequently interact with visitors, and the sea lions are fond of following and mimicking small children.

Butterflies: In Living Color! was renovated in 2007. The exhibit housed as many as 1,000 butterflies of 35 different species. There were 56 varieties of plants for the butterflies to feed on.

Construction of the Teton Trek exhibit started in February 2008. The decision to clearcut 4 acres (1.6 ha) of old growth forest in the Old Forest Arboretum in order to build the exhibit drew sustained criticism by Citizens to Preserve Overton Park, which was reorganized in response to the forest reduction, and by Park Friends, Inc. Approximately 14 acres of forest adjacent to the zoo were left out of the protective area to ease opposition from former Memphis Mayor A C Wharton and zoo officials.

The zoo had its largest single day attendance ever on March 17, 2009, with more than 20,450 visitors. In late May 2009, the Birds and Bees exhibit opened in the former butterfly exhibit. The butterfly garden moved outside the aviary, and is still close to the original exhibit. Longtime zoo favorite "Ann" the reticulated python died on July 28, 2009. She was 18 years old. Teton Trek was opened on October 10, 2009, and winning artists of the Teton Trek Art Contest were recognized.

The zoo's second African exhibit, Zambezi River Hippo Camp, opened to the public on April 29, 2016.

== Exhibits ==
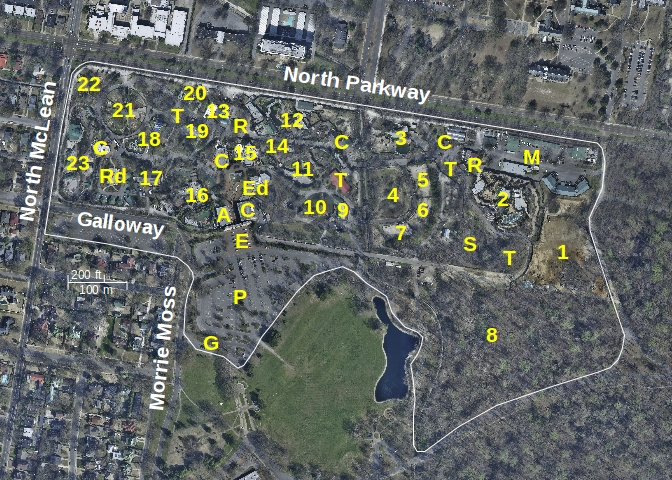
Bird's-eye view of the exhibits and facilities of the Memphis Zoo. Legend Exhibits: 1 Teton Trek* 2 Northwest Passage 3 Elephants, rhino 4 Bongos, gazelles, ostriches 5 Zebras, oryx 6 Bonteboks 7 Giraffe 8 Chickasaw Bluff Trail (planned) 9 Birds and Bees (seasonal) 10 Waterfowl 11 Primate Canyon 12 China Exhibit 13 Hippos 14 Bonobos 15 Animals of the Night 16 Cat Country 17 Tropical Bird House 18 Penguin Rock, pelicans 19 Herpetarium 20 Dragon's Lair 21 Round Barn 22 Aquarium 23 Once Upon A Farm Facilities: A Administration C Concessions E Entrance Plaza Ed Education Center G Gate to parking M Maintenance P Parking R Restrooms Rd Rides S Ice skating (seasonal) T Picnic tables * Under construction in this 2008 image

The zoo hosts modern exhibits that mimic the animals' natural habitats, such as Once Upon A Farm, Cat Country, Primate Canyon, Dragon's Lair, Animals of the Night, Tropical Bird House, Herpetarium, Aquarium, African Veldt, Zambezi River Hippo Camp, China, Northwest Passage, and Teton Trek. Viewing all the exhibits requires a walk of about 2 miles (3.2 km). Operating seasonally, trams provide visitors with guided tours of exhibits for a small daily fee; the trams are also useful for shuttling visitors between distant exhibits. Other attractions at the zoo include a carousel, an area with rides, a miniature train offering a scenic view of the Once Upon A Farm exhibit, and several theme-oriented gift shops and eateries; many of these amenities operate seasonally. A children's playground is located next to the Cat House Cafe, and several family picnic areas are maintained beneath groves of mature trees. An ice skating rink is operated seasonally at the zoo; the tented rink has an area of 5,400 square feet for skating. Camel rides and giraffe feeding are offered from March to October 2012 for a fee.

The zoo is divided into three zones that showcase a total of 19 different exhibits.

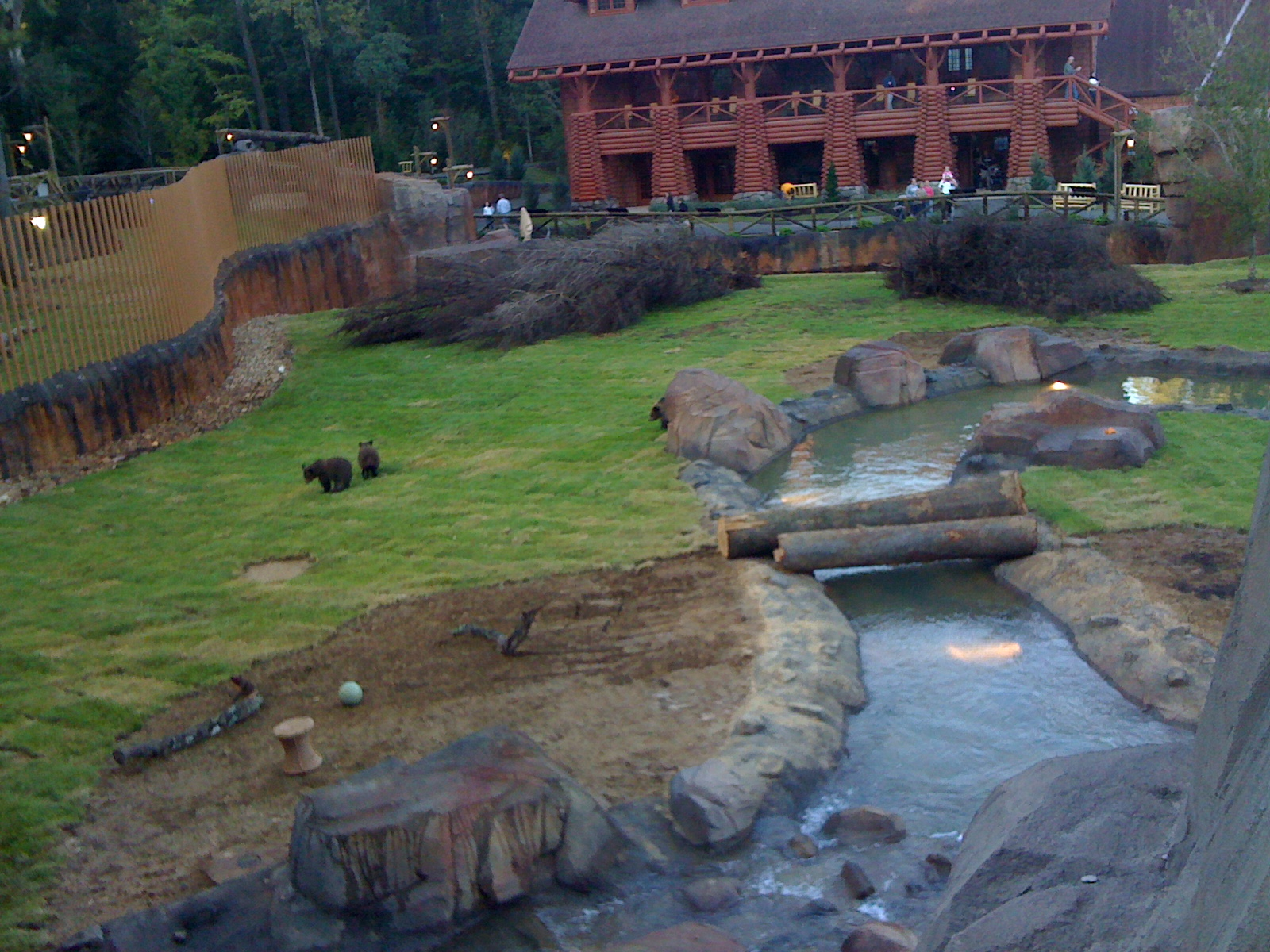
Young grizzly bears in Teton Trek with Great Lodge in background

=== East zone ===
==== Teton Trek ====
The 4-acre (1.6 ha) exhibit, which opened October 2009, brings hallmark features of the Yellowstone National Park to the Memphis Zoo. "Teton" refers to the Teton Range in Wyoming. Teton Trek begins with a 25-foot (7.6 m) replica of the Old Faithful Geyser and a 5,000-square-foot (460 m^{2}) replica of the Old Faithful Inn called the Great Lodge, where interpretive information is presented in an interactive format. The exhibit is home to some of the keystone species of the Yellowstone ecosystem: grizzly bears, elk, timber wolves, trumpeter swans, a North American porcupine, black bears and sandhill cranes. The exhibit's trail provides visitors with an underwater look at the bears' fishing pond and a prominent overlook atop the 25-foot (7.6 m) replica of Yellowstone's Firehole Falls.

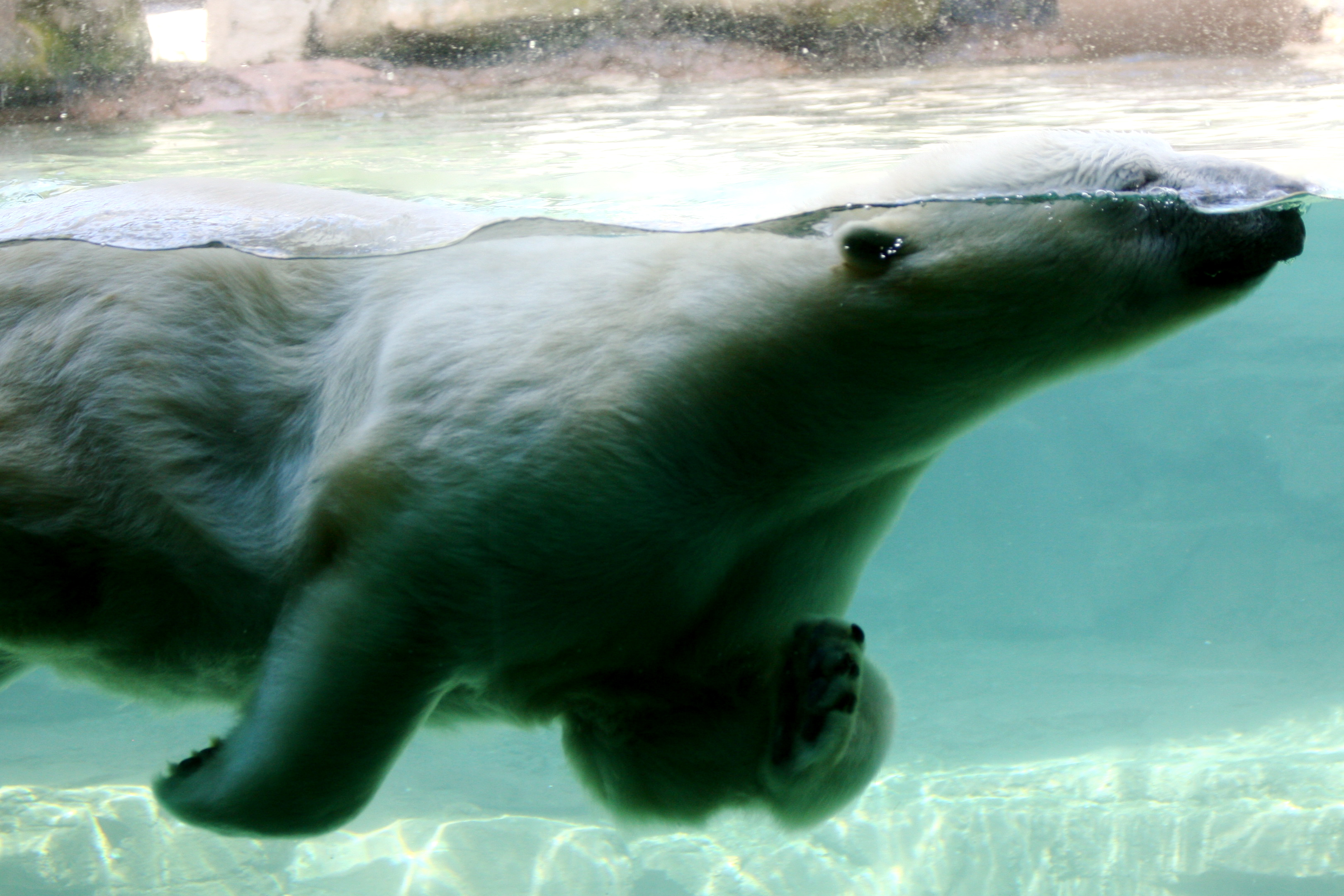
A polar bear swimming in the Northwest Passage exhibit

==== Northwest Passage ====
Home to the zoo's polar bears, this $23 million exhibit opened on March 1, 2006, and features an underwater viewing building, sea lion observation bubble and a 500-seat amphitheater for daily sea lion shows. This exhibit's theme is a tribute to the First Nations culture in Canada's western province British Columbia, animals that inhabit the Pacific Northwest, and its horticulture. Messages of conservation inspired by Chief Seattle, a famous Native American chief, are sprinkled throughout the exhibit. Six hand-carved totem poles that stand throughout the area received a Native American blessing ceremony when they arrived at the zoo. The Northwest Passage is also home to the zoo's American bald eagles, and white-necked ravens.

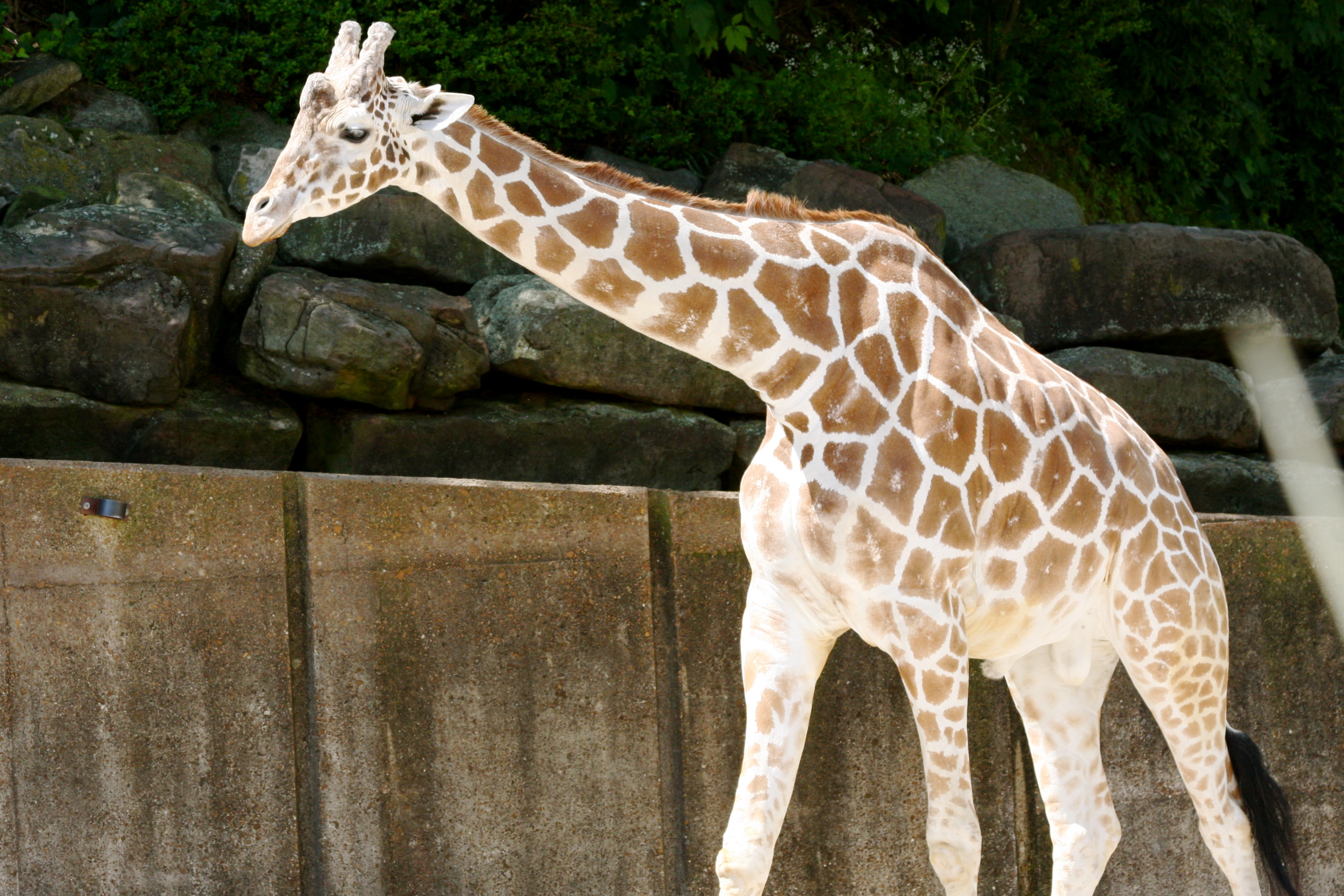
A giraffe walks along the backside of its exhibit in the African Veldt

==== African Veldt ====
African elephants, white rhinos, and giraffe are joined by zebras, Grant's gazelle, and ostriches in this area. African cranes, bontebok, lechwe, bongo and scimitar oryx also live here. The zoo finished enlarging the elephant exhibit in 2006; it now features a pool that allows elephants to submerse and bathe.

==== World of Waterfowl ====
In this exhibit, two wooden bridges take visitors through a wetland. It is home to around 30 Chilean flamingos and a variety of other waterfowl.

==== Birds and Bees ====
This exhibit opened in May 2009. It features an up-close look at two honey bee hives. Displays inside the exhibit explain what makes bees special and the role they play in agriculture. The indoor bee exhibit leads to an outdoor aviary that features approximately 500 budgies, commonly known as parakeets. In addition to viewing these colorful birds, visitors can feed them using millet seed-heads attached to sticks that are available for a small fee.

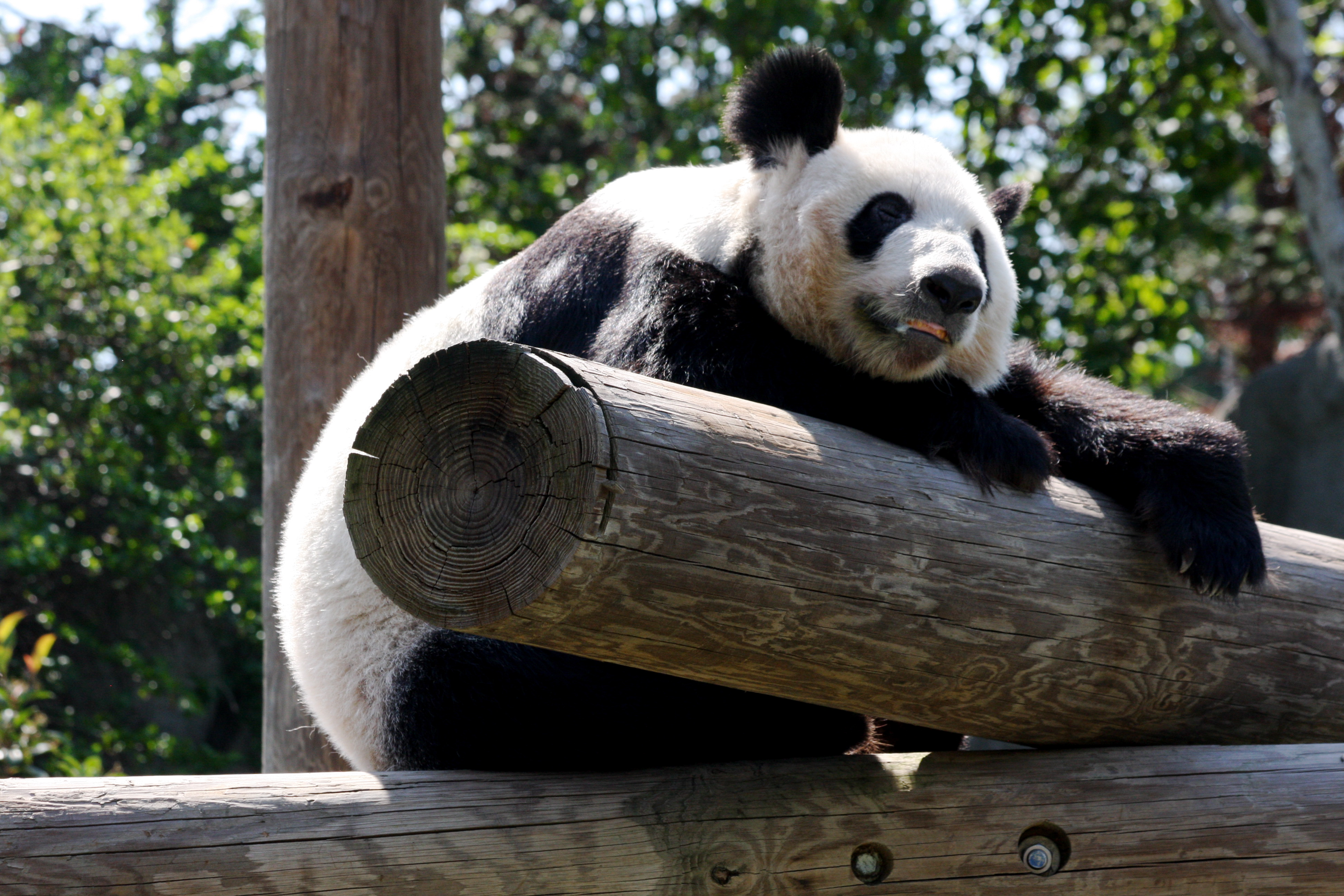
A panda at the Memphis Zoo enjoying the sun

=== Central zone ===
==== China ====
Opened in April 2003, this $16 million exhibit is a zoogeographical area the Memphis Zoo constructed after it became one of only four U.S. zoos to exhibit the giant panda. As of 2023, there are no giant pandas in residence at the Memphis Zoo. Other animals showcased in this effort to preserve Chinese species include Sulawesi Black-crested macaques, Père David's deer, red pandas, François' langurs, and an assortment of colorful birds such as the golden pheasant and red-crowned crane.

==== Primate Canyon ====
This exhibit was opened in 1995 and features naturalistic, outdoor exhibit areas for western lowland gorillas, Sumatran orangutans and siamang gibbons. Other animals in the area are lion-tailed macaques, black-and-white ruffed lemurs, Mona monkeys, Sulawesi macaques, red ruffed lemurs, lesser spot-nosed monkeys, eastern black-and-white colobus, and savanna baboons.

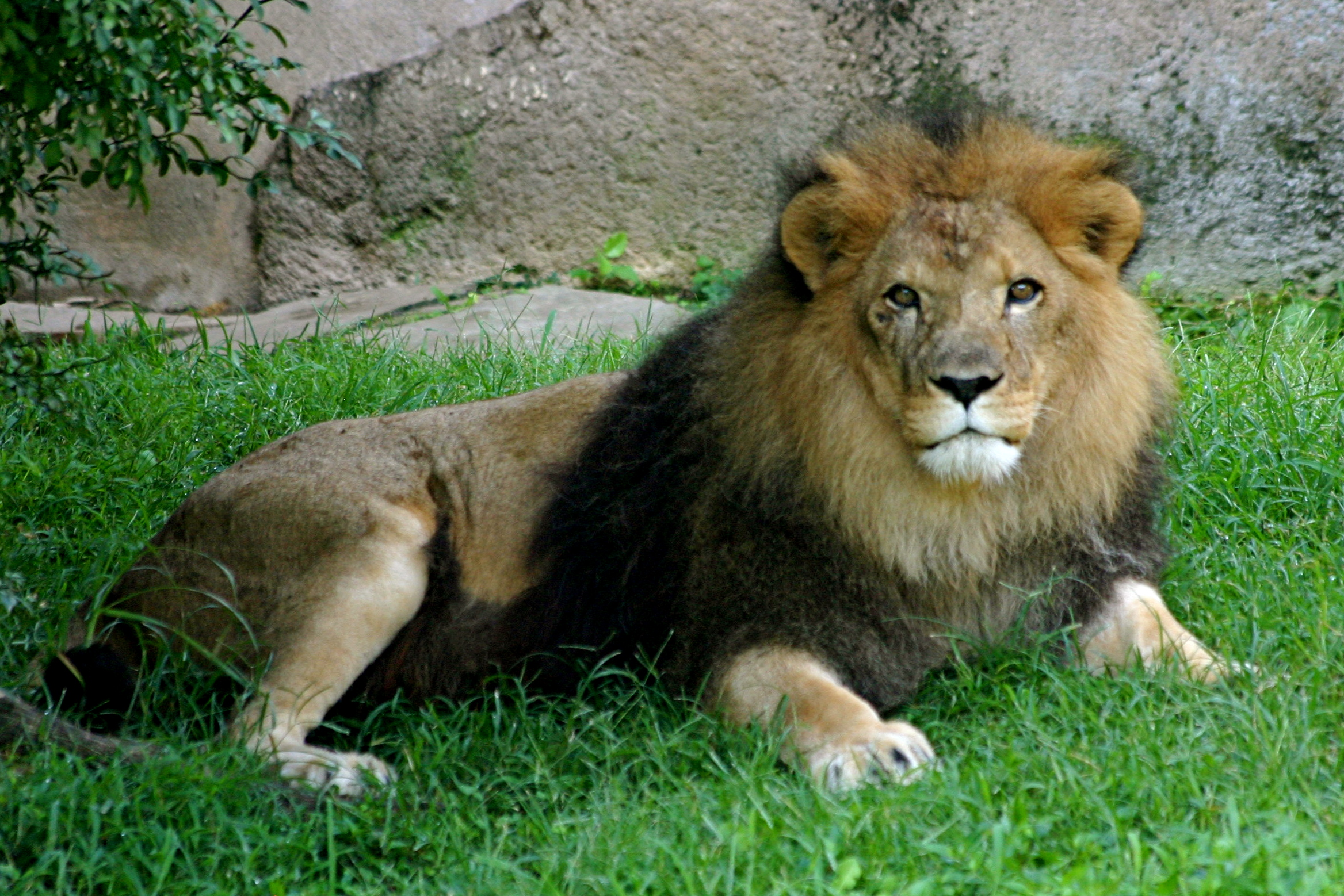
"Fred" the African lion keeps a watchful lookout.

==== Commercial Appeal Cat Country ====
This 3-acre (1.2 ha), open-air exhibit houses African lions, cheetahs, Capybara, Amur leopards, meerkats, caracals, capybaras, Bat-eared Foxs, cougars, Sumatran tigers, Bengal tigers, jaguars, snow leopards, and red pandas. The zoo employed cultural architecture native to the land of the species on exhibit (for example, temple ruins surround the Sumatran tiger exhibit). The old Carnivora Building, where the cats used to live, was renovated to become the Memphis Zoo's primary restaurant – the Cat House Café.

==== Zambezi River Hippo Camp ====
This African exhibit opened in 2016. Its location is adjacent to the Primate Pavilion and south entrance to the African Veldt. It is home to hippos, Nile crocodiles, okapi, yellow-backed duikers, Cape vultures, taveta weavers, nyalas, mandrills, blue-bellied rollers, patas monkeys, Chilean and lesser flamingos.

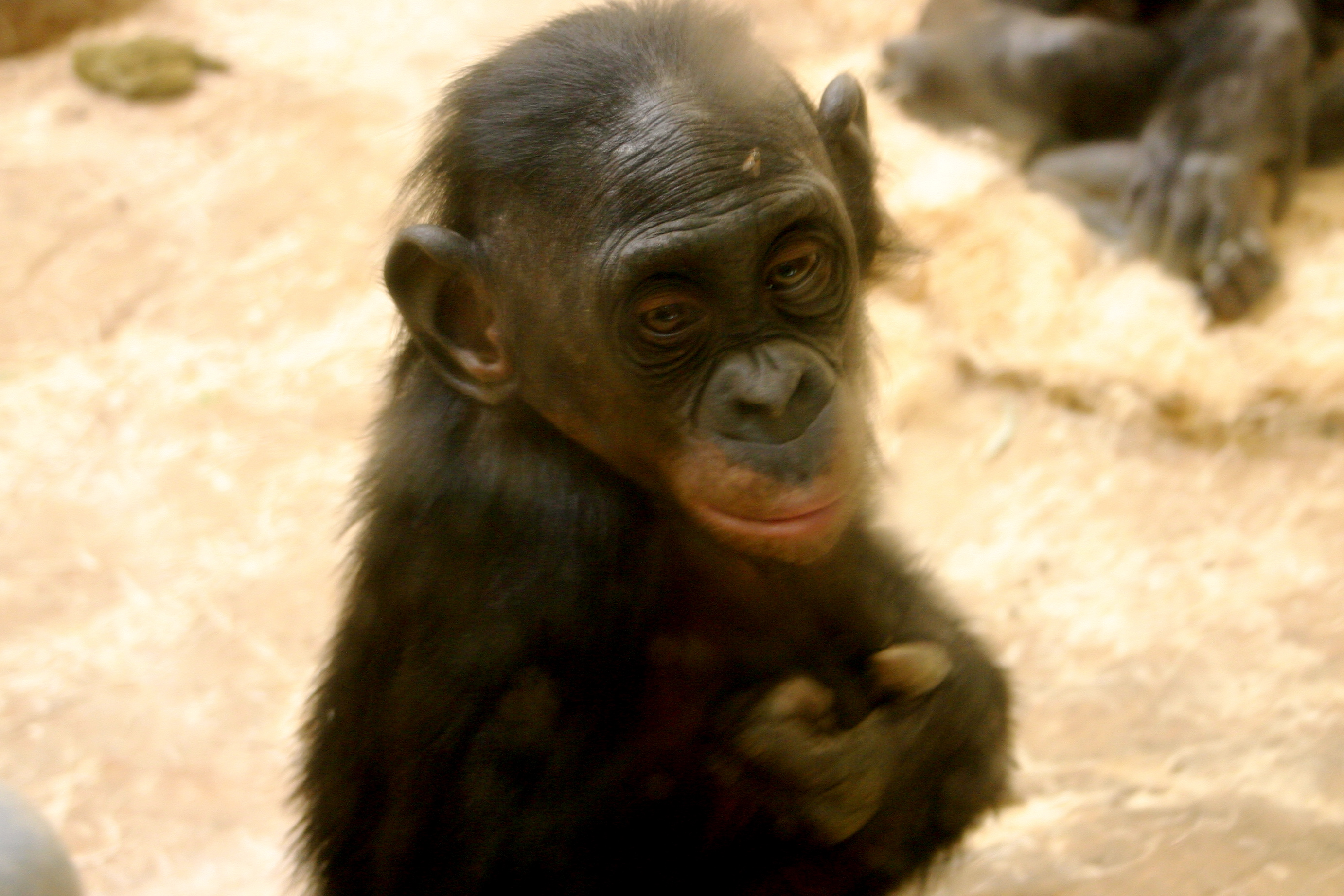
A baby bonobo investigates a visitor.

Bonobos

Six bonobos (including a baby bonobo born in 2005) live in this indoor/outdoor hybrid exhibit across from the China exhibit. The bonobo is endangered and is found in the wild only in the Democratic Republic of Congo.

==== Animals of the Night ====
This exhibit reverses the daily cycle of nocturnal animals, giving visitors the chance to see night-dwellers at their most active. The exhibit is developed around a central bat flyway which enables visitors to get a close-up view of the bats in flight or feeding. Also exhibited are a wide range of other species—from aardvark to wombat.The exhibit also features the Bear cuscus which is featured in only 4 other zoos around the world.

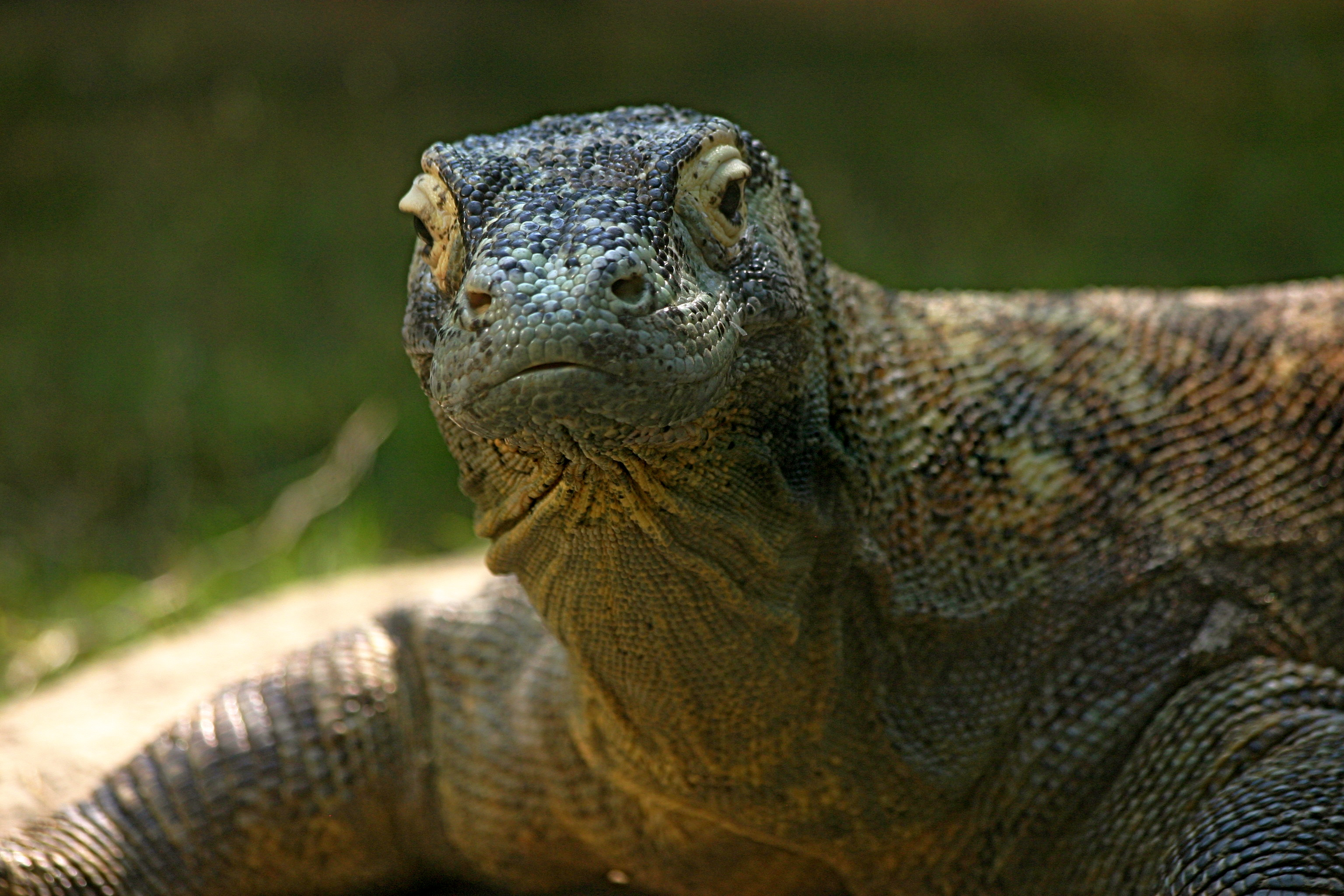
One of the Memphis Zoo's Komodo dragons

=== West zone ===
==== Dragon's Lair ====
This exhibit was specifically built for the Komodo dragon, the largest lizard in the world. The zoo's three dragons share a special exhibit with outdoor and indoor areas allowing them to stay warm during the cool winter months. Keepers hold a feeding demonstration of the Komodo dragons on Saturdays.

==== Tropical Bird House ====
A variety of colorful birds in outdoor enclosures can be seen by visitors at the entrance to the zoo's Tropical Bird House. The building is home to exotic bird species from around the world such as the pygmy falcon, Burrowing owl, azure-winged magpie, Bali myna, crested coua, golden white-eye, Jambu fruit dove, Mariana fruit dove, plush-crested jay, purple-throated fruitcrow, red-billed hornbill, Tinian monarch, Toco toucan, and the white-tailed trogon. The exhibit features a walk-through aviary which allows visitors close contact to a number of birds, especially during feeding time.

==== Aquarium ====
The Aquarium is one of the oldest exhibits at the Memphis Zoo and houses aquatic life from both fresh and salt water environments. Some of the more notable animals include: Fly River turtles, electric eels, red bellied piranhas, archer fish, green moray eels, porcupine pufferfish, Arapaima and Volitan lionfish, The electric eel exhibit has a unique feature that converts the eel's electric pulses into a sound and visual display.

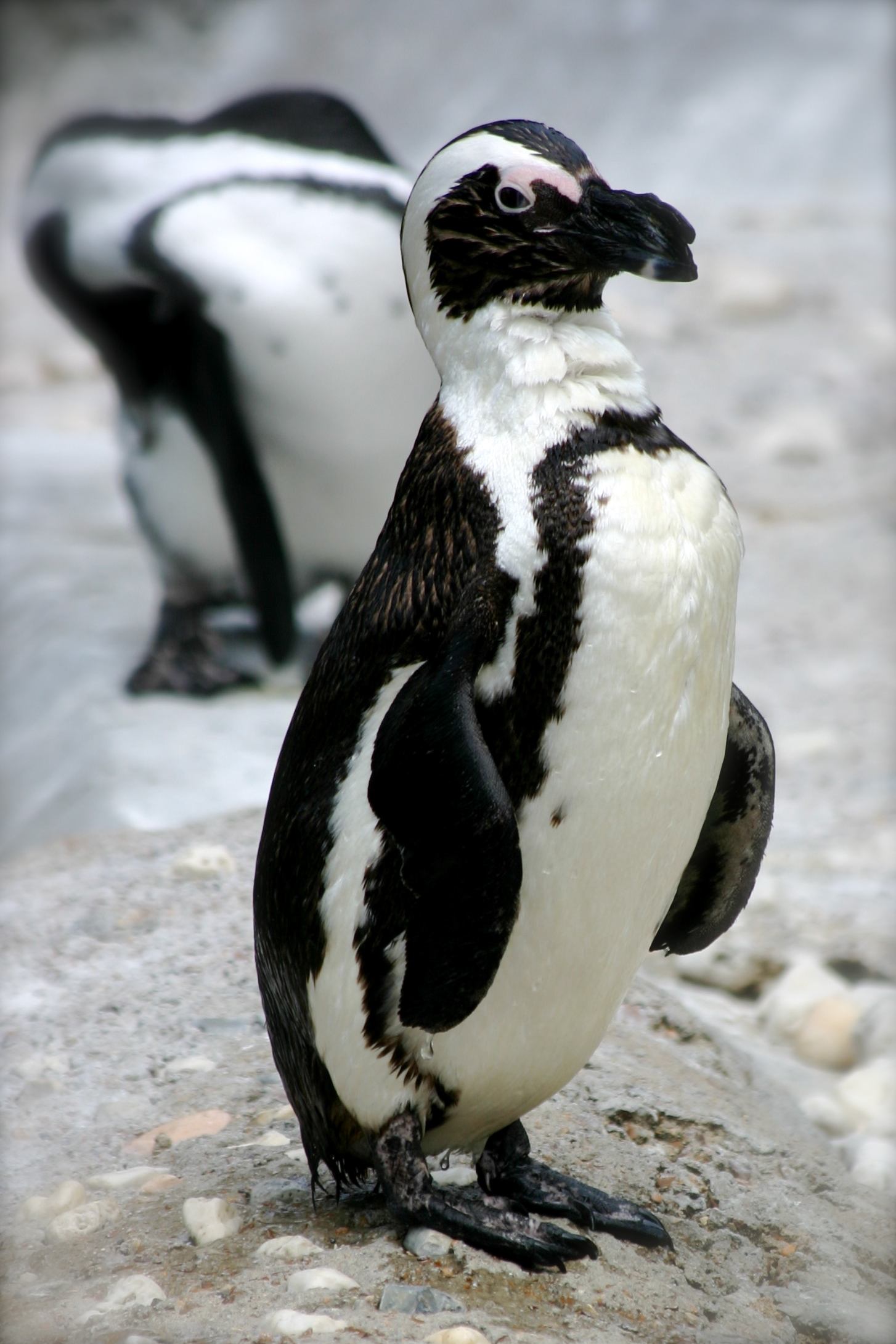
An African penguin

==== Penguin Rock ====
Over 30 African penguins live across from the zoo's rides area at Penguin Rock. American white pelicans are located nearby.

==== Once Upon A Farm ====
This exhibit was built to resemble an early 1900s farm. It is home to Caspian horses, domestic goats, prairie dogs, domestic chickens, Babydoll sheep, miniature cows, guinea pigs, Pekin ducks and miniature donkeys. In addition to farm animals, a vegetable garden, a cotton patch, and rows of corn provide visitors with some of the essential elements of a southern farm during the growing season.

==== Herpetarium ====
Located across from the Tropical Bird House, the herpetarium is home to the zoo's snakes such as the Burmese python, American alligators, lizards such as the Prehensile-tailed skink, and frogs such as the azure poison dart frog, Bell's horned frog, and milk frog. It includes the rare Louisiana pine snake and the axolotl, in addition to some of the most venomous snakes in the world, including the green mamba, Eastern diamondback rattlesnake, and Gaboon viper. It is home to an alligator snapping turtle and Galápagos tortoises. In a seasonal exhibit, a simulated shallow pond provides favorable breeding habitat for the highly endangered Mississippi gopher frog; this exhibit also features a slide presentation describing the zoo's participation in the frog's recovery program. The exhibit also includes a selection of Crocodiles which includes Dwarf crocodiles, West African slender-snouted crocodiles, and an American alligator.

==== Round Barn ====
The Round Barn is home to gerenuks, which are known by their extremely long necks. Keepers encourage their foraging behavior by placing tall bamboo stems in their exhibit. This exhibit also houses Abyssinian ground-hornbills, warthogs, red river hogs, Grey crowned crane, nyalas, yellow-backed duikers, dik diks, klipspringers, and dama gazelles.

== Other features ==
=== Landscaping ===
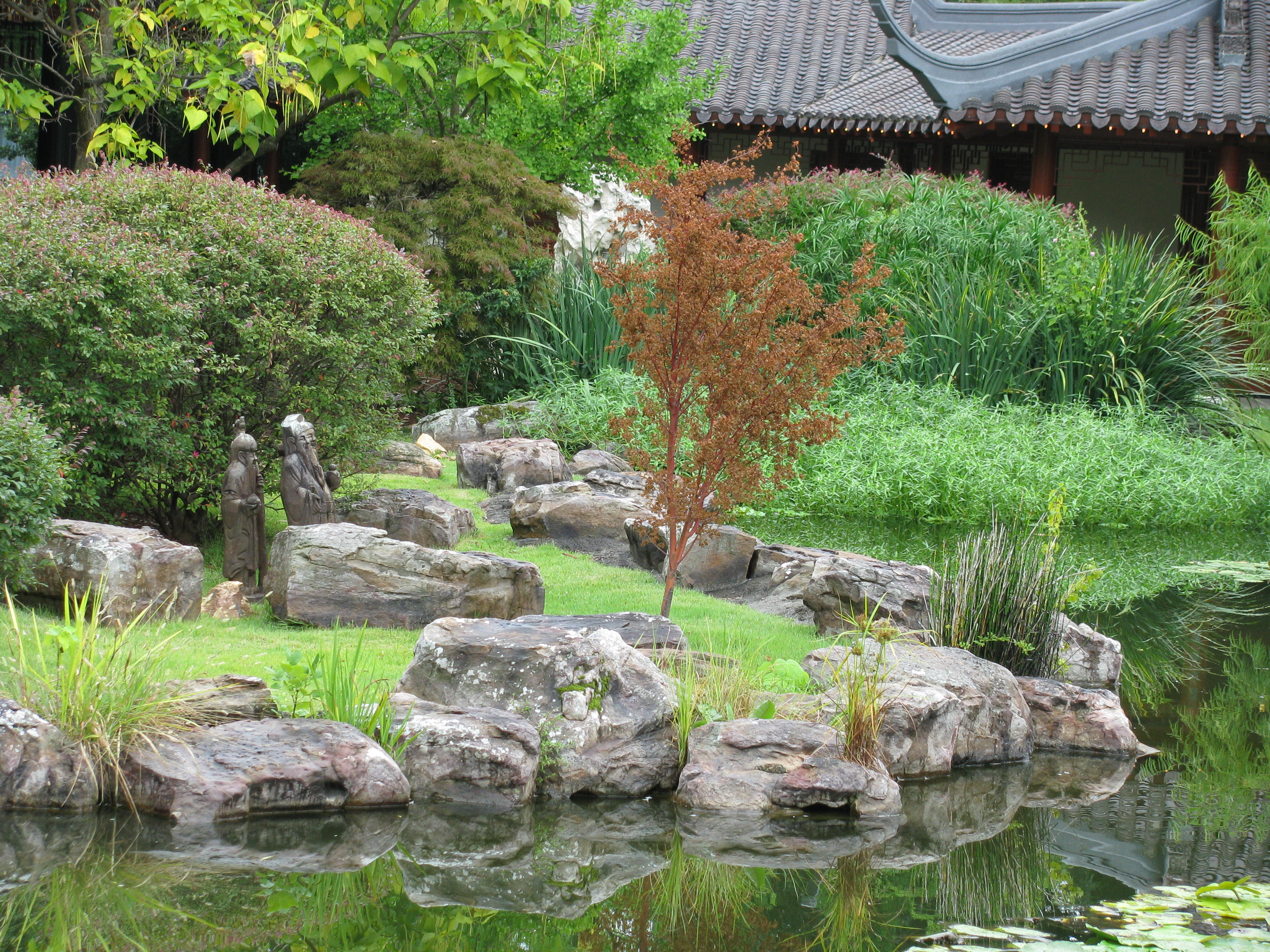
China exhibit interior

Landscaping plays a key role in each of the zoo's three zones, both within exhibits and along the interconnecting trails. Water features, such as ponds, waterfalls, fountains, and streams, are dominant elements of the overall design, in addition to artificial rock formations which blend into the containment walls of the animals' enclosures. Other key elements of the landscaping are a diverse mix of trees, shrubs, and seasonal herbaceous plants.

Most of the larger trees are native species, which include sweetgum, sycamore, tulip poplar and a host of different oaks and hickories. Common shrubs include colorful native species, such as American beautyberry, oakleaf hydrangea, southern bayberry, and witch hazel, plus numerous exotic shrubs selected for their individual merits. Some exhibits feature plants that support the exhibit's theme, such as the Chinese fringetrees and Chinese snowball viburnums in the China Exhibit and several species of western conifers, maples, and birches in the Northwest Passage and Teton Trek Exhibits.

Several gardens are maintained within the zoo, where the plants are the featured items. In addition, tropical plants are grown in several areas during summer months; species include banana plants, elephant ears, hibiscuses, and oleanders growing above a groundcover of coleus and ornamental sweet potato.

=== Events ===
The Memphis Zoo sponsors a wide variety of special events with the overall theme—Always Something To Do. These include: Horticultural Tours (periodic), Plant Sale (April), Zoo Boo with its Haunted Forest (October), Zoo Lights with over 1 million holiday lights, Santa, live reindeer, and magic show (November/December), Zoo Rendezvous (September), Zoo Snooze (periodic), and many more. There are also a wide assortment of educational activities throughout the year for school-aged children.

=== Magazine ===
Exzoobrance is a bimonthly magazine published by the Memphis Zoological Society to keep patrons informed about zoo-related activities and information. Each edition includes a calendar of events, a description of special events, news about educational and conservation programs, information about the animals and their exhibits, and a kid's activity page. Copies are archived online beginning in 2009.

== Incidents ==
On January 8, 2008, a stray dog entered the Memphis Zoo through a service door and leapt into the tiger exhibit before officials could apprehend it. Zoo staff distracted the tigers, allowing the dog to walk out of the exhibit and survive with several injuries.

In May 2009, a zoo keeper was bitten by a Bengal tiger after failing to close two internal safety doors, allowing a tiger to enter an unsecured hallway. The tiger, named Kumari, was sedated and safely placed back in her exhibit.

In 2019, a man entering the Memphis Zoo shot himself in the upper thigh with a handgun hidden in his pocket. This incident brought attention to the zoo's firearm policies and zoo officials stated that they would look into it.
