= Overton Park =

Historic public park in Memphis, Tennessee, United States

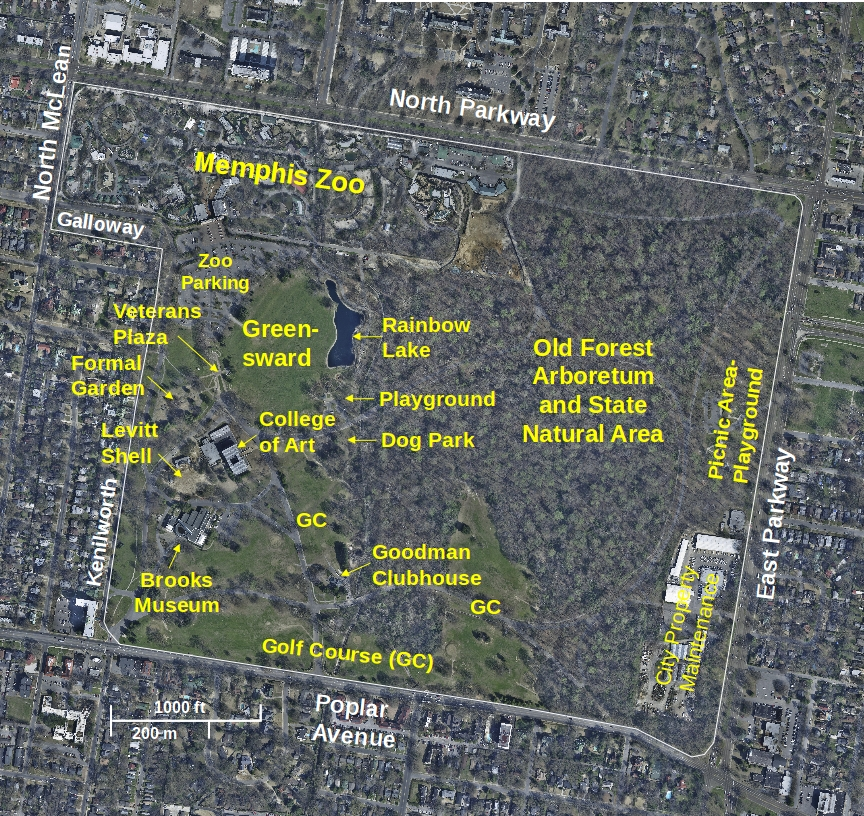
- Bird's-eye view of the major features of Overton Park
- Interactive map of Overton Park
- Type: Urban park
- Location: Midtown, Memphis, Tennessee
- Coordinates: 35°8′47″N 89°59′21″W
- Area: 342 acres (138 ha)
- Website: overtonpark.org
- Overton Park Historic District
- U.S. National Register of Historic Places
- U.S. Historic district
- Architect: George E. Kessler
- NRHP reference No.: 79002475
- Added to NRHP: October 25, 1979

Overton Park is a 342-acre (138 ha) public park in Midtown, Memphis, Tennessee. The park grounds contain the Memphis Brooks Museum of Art, Memphis Zoo, a 9-hole golf course, the Metal Museum, Rainbow Lake, Veterans Plaza, the Greensward, and other features. The park was established in 1906 and contains the Old Forest Arboretum of Overton Park, one of the few remaining old growth forests in Tennessee.

== History ==
The property, once known locally as Lea's Woods, was purchased by Memphis on November 14, 1901, for $110,000 (equivalent to $4,257,000 in 2025); it was located along the city's eastern and northern boundary at that time. Overton Park was designed by landscape architect George Kessler as part of a comprehensive plan that also included Riverside Park (later M.L. King Riverside Park) and the Memphis Parkway System. The planning began in 1901, and Overton Park was established in 1906. The park is named in honor of John Overton, a co-founder of Memphis. Overton's name was selected in a competition to name the new park conducted by the Evening Scimitar, a local newspaper; the three choices in the voting were Memphis founding fathers Andrew Jackson, Overton, and James Winchester. The official naming occurred on July 25, 1902.

In the 1960s and 1970s Overton Park was the subject of controversy when 26 of its 342 acres (138 ha) were slated by highway planners to be demolished to build Interstate 40 through the park to make it easier for suburban commuters to get to downtown. A small number of residents of midtown formed a group known as Citizens to Preserve Overton Park, and challenged the plan in court. Ultimately, the United States Supreme Court ruled in their favor in the landmark case Citizens to Preserve Overton Park v. Volpe.

Nevertheless, the City of Memphis and Tennessee Department of Transportation continued to propose a number of alternatives for routing Interstate 40 through Overton Park, including building the highway in a tunnel, or in a deep trench. In 1978, Citizens to Preserve Overton Park successfully nominated the park to the National Register of Historic Places, thus guaranteeing that Federal funding could not be used for projects that damaged the park's historic integrity without approval from the U.S. Department of the Interior. The Memphis Commercial Appeal called the National Registration the "final nail in the coffin" of efforts to route Interstate 40 through Overton Park.

Beginning in June 1974, the road system within the interior of Overton Park was gradually closed to motorized vehicles on weekends and holidays, which were called "People's Days". Although initially there were some objections, the new policy gained popularity, and the closures were made permanent on April 13, 1987, except for official vehicles.

When the entirely white Hein Park community walled off access to Overton Park through West Drive, predominantly black neighbors from across Jackson Avenue sued under the Civil Rights Act of 1866. In 1981 a narrowly divided U.S. Supreme Court found the barrier was legal, although dissenting Justice Thurgood Marshall admonished that "a group of white citizens has decided to act to keep Negro citizens from traveling through their urban "utopia" and the city has placed its seal of approval on the scheme."

Overton Park was selected for inclusion in the 2009 Landslide Program sponsored by The Cultural Landscape Foundation. This program "spotlights great places designed by seminal and regionally influential landscape figures, which are threatened with change."

By vote of the Memphis City Council on December 6, 2011, the nonprofit Overton Park Conservancy assumed management of 184 acres (74 ha) of Overton Park. The 10-year agreement covers the East Picnic Area, Greensward, Formal Gardens, Old Forest State Natural Area, and Veteran's Plaza. The Levitt Shell, Memphis Brooks Museum of Art, Memphis College of Art, Memphis Zoo, and the Overton Park Golf Course are managed independently.

== Brooks Museum of Art ==
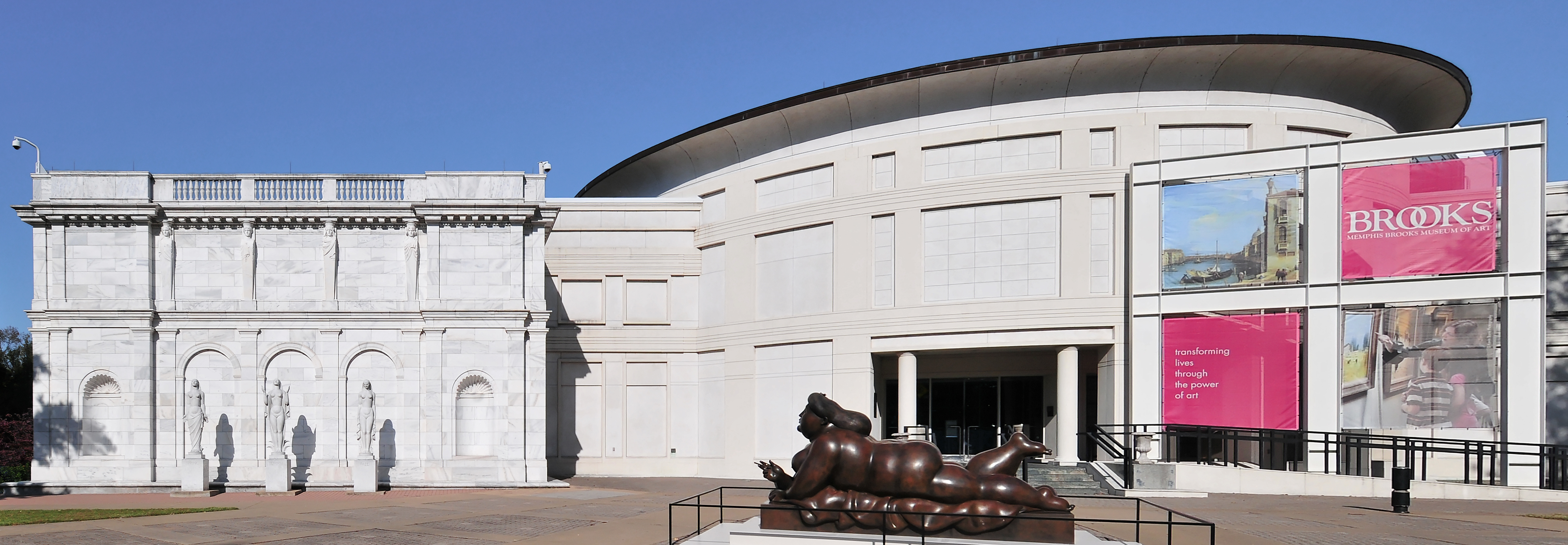
Memphis Brooks Museum of Art

The Brooks Museum is a privately funded, nonprofit art museum located in Overton Park. Founded in 1916, the Brooks Museum is the oldest and largest art museum in the state of Tennessee.

The facility consists of 29 galleries, art classrooms, a print study room with over 4,500 works of art on paper, a research library with over 5,000 volumes, and an auditorium. The collection has over 7,000 works of art, including paintings, sculptures, drawings, prints, photographs, and examples of the decorative arts.

In 2017, the Brooks Museum announced that they will be relocating to a facility in downtown Memphis.

== Levitt Shell ==
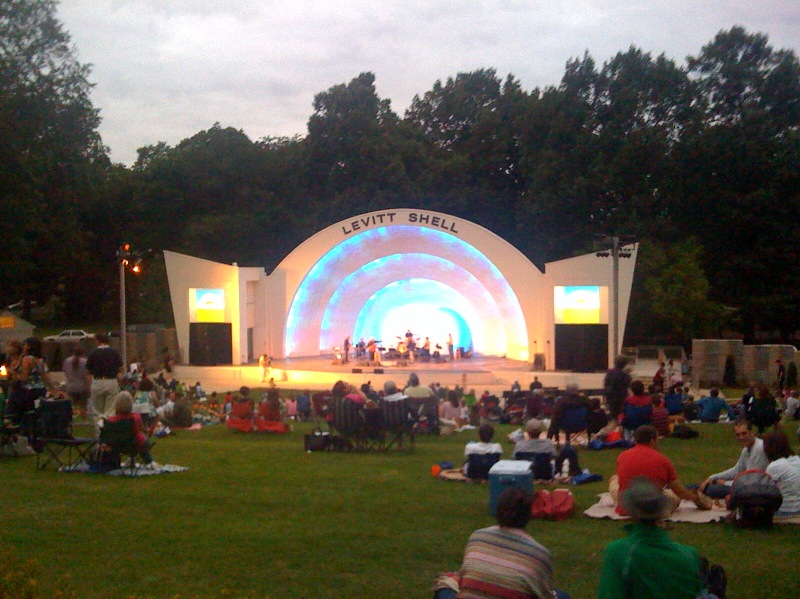
Levitt Shell, June 2009

Overton Park also includes the famous Shell theater, where Elvis Presley gave his first paid concert on July 30, 1954.

The Overton Park Shell was built in 1936 by the City of Memphis and the Works Progress Administration for $11,935, as part of the New Deal. Designed by architect Max Furbringer, it was modeled after similar shells in Chicago, New York, and St. Louis. The WPA built 27 band shells; the Overton Park Shell is one of only a few that still remain. After various changes in ownership, the Shell was renamed in 2007 as the Levitt Shell at Overton Park and a large-scale renovation underwritten by the Levitt Foundation was begun. The renovation was conducted by Memphis firm Askew Nixon Ferguson Architects with state-of-the-art audio and visual design. With the completion of the renovations on September 8, 2008, free concerts are now once again held in the Shell.

== Memphis College of Art ==
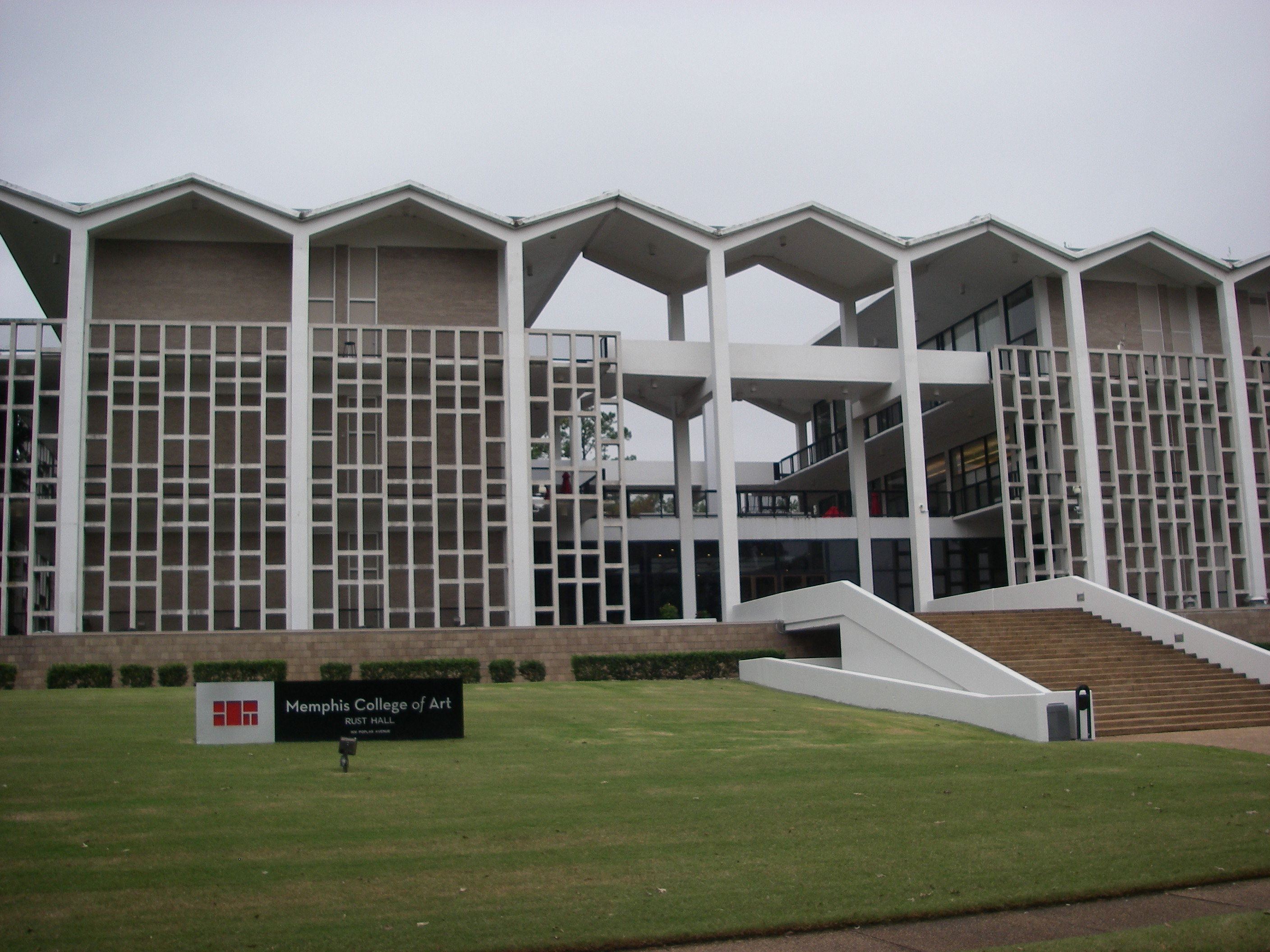
Memphis College of Art

Memphis College of Art is a small, private college of art and design located in Overton Park. It offers Bachelor of Fine Arts, Master of Fine Arts, Master of Arts in Art Education and Master of Arts in Teaching degrees. Some of the majors include graphic design, drawing, painting, printmaking, book arts, computer arts, photography, animation, and illustration.

Founded in 1936, it moved into the Overton Park facilities in February 1959. There are around 450 students each year, with 350 being undergraduate and 100 being graduate students. It is accredited by the Commission on Colleges of the Southern Association of Colleges and Schools and the National Association of Schools of Art and Design. It has enabled generations of leading artists, designers and educators to flourish professionally and contribute valuable ideas to society. Unfortunately, due to economic problems, as of October, 2017, the college is no longer enrolling new students, and will close after graduating the present student body.

== Memphis Zoo ==
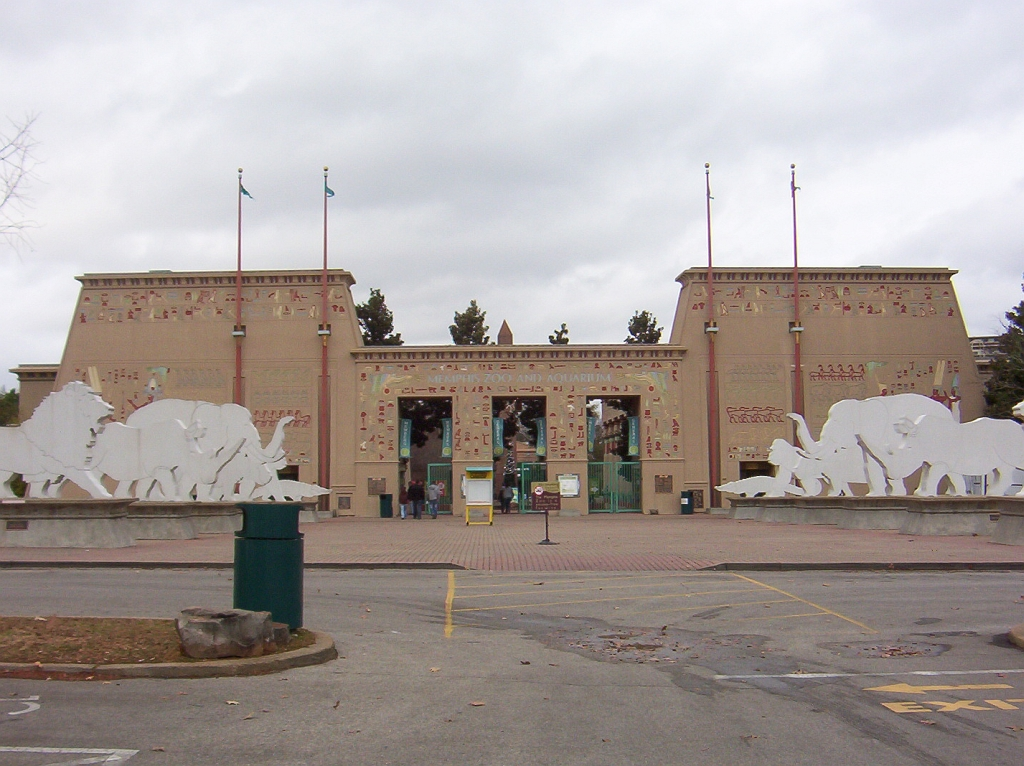
Memphis Zoo entrance gate

Overton Park Zoo (now named the Memphis Zoo) began in 1906, when a resident of Memphis couldn't keep his pet black bear in his backyard. He had it put in a pen in the park, which attracted many people, inspiring the idea to place more animals on display. The Memphis Zoo is now one of the largest in the United States, attracting 1 million visitors per year. The zoo is home to more than 3,500 animals representing over 500 different species. The Zoo has been a major tenant of Overton Park for more than 100 years. The city-owned land currently designated to the Zoo was defined by the Overton Park master plan in 1988. The Zoo is set on 76 acres (31 ha), of which approximately 55 acres (22 ha) are developed.

The Zoo has completed over $77 million for renovation and expansion since the early 1990s. The Zoo's animal inhabitants reside in one-of-a-kind exhibitry, such as Northwest Passage and CHINA - home to giant pandas Ya Ya and Le Le. The Memphis Zoo is an accredited member of the Association of Zoos & Aquariums (AZA).

In February, 2008, the Memphis Zoo cleared 4 acres (1.6 ha) of old growth forest in the Old Forest Arboretum at Overton Park in order to begin construction of the Zoo's new Teton Trek exhibit. The Teton Trek exhibit will feature animals native to the Greater Yellowstone Ecosystem such as grizzly bears, elk, gray wolves, trumpeter swans and sandhill crane.

The Zoo's decision to clear old growth forest to build the Teton Trek exhibit has been criticized by Citizens to Preserve Overton Park and Park Friends Inc, who subsequently pursued a successful, 16-month campaign to have the Arboretum designated as a State Natural Area by the Tennessee General Assembly.

== Outdoor recreational areas ==
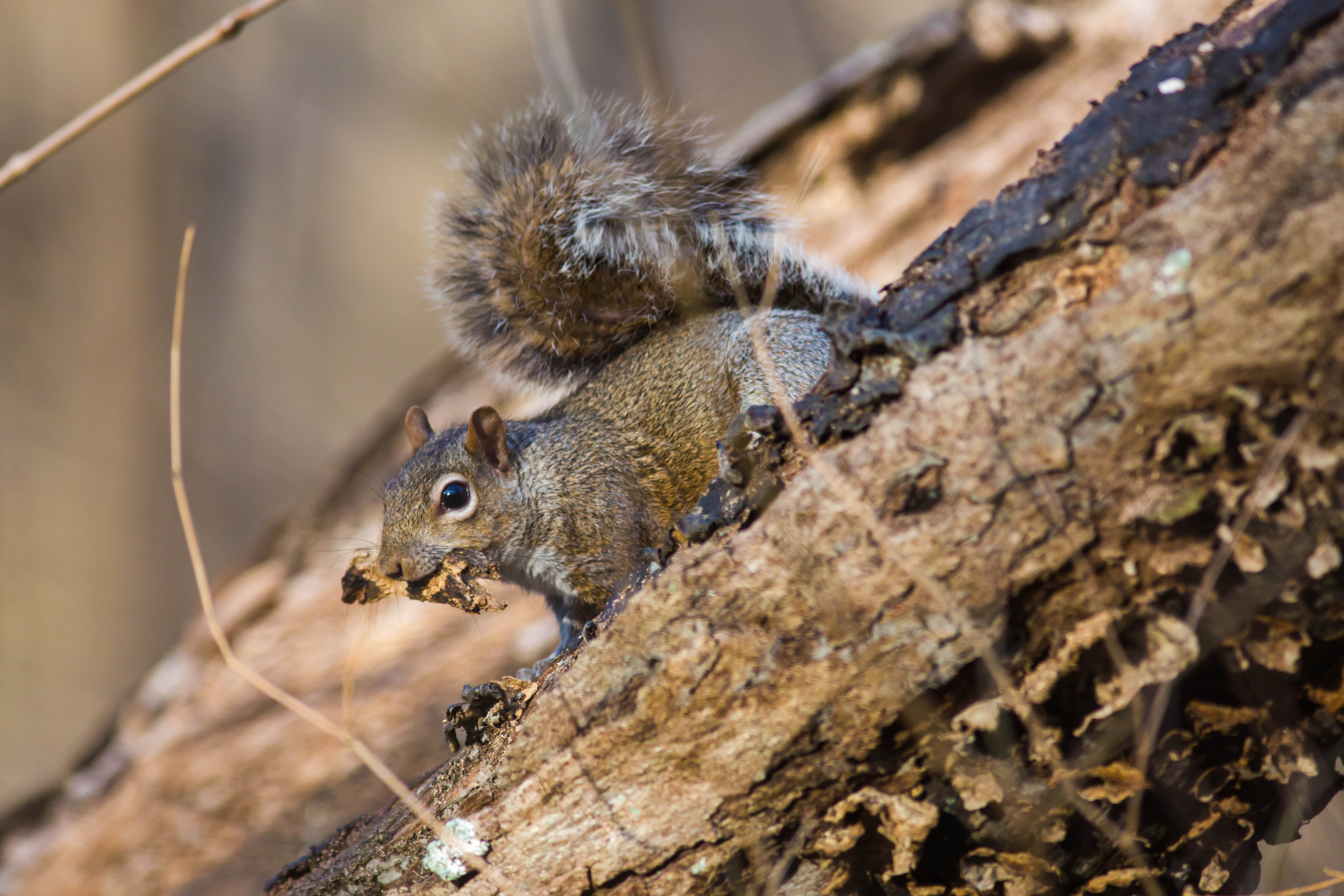
Eastern gray squirrel. Nature watching is just one of the many activities in the different parts of the park.

Over one half of the area of Overton Park is dedicated to general outdoor recreation and/or environmental preservation. Activities include picnicking, jogging, hiking, nature study and some team sports. An off-leash area is open for dogs. These areas are under management by the Overton Park Conservancy.

=== Dog park ===
Overton Bark, a fenced-in, 1.3-acre (0.53 ha) dog park, is located to the southeast of the Greensward; it opened in June 2012. Separate areas are provided for large and small dogs, and water is available. It also includes benches for owners to sit on and dog to play around.

=== Formal Gardens ===
The walkways, benches, and garden beds of the Formal Gardens extend from Morrie Moss Lane, on the western boundary of Overton Park, to Veterans Plaza; they were established in 1904–05. The gardens present a colorful array of seasonal flowers within a background of scattered evergreen and deciduous trees; the central portion of the gardens is surrounded by Crepe myrtles. Although the composition of the beds has varied over time, the layout has remained basically the same. The Clara Conway Memorial Pergola was built in conjunction with the Formal Gardens to honor Clara Conway, a distinguished Memphis educator. The memorial was destroyed in a 1936 storm, but residents still associate Conway's name with the Formal Gardens.

=== Overton Golf Course ===
The 9-hole Overton Park Golf Course is located in the southwestern part of Overton Park. It is a 2,222-yard, par 34 course with 3 sets of teeboxes for different levels of golfing experience. Built in 1926, the Abe Goodman Golf Clubhouse is a Tudor-styled, brick building with a patio.

=== Greensward ===
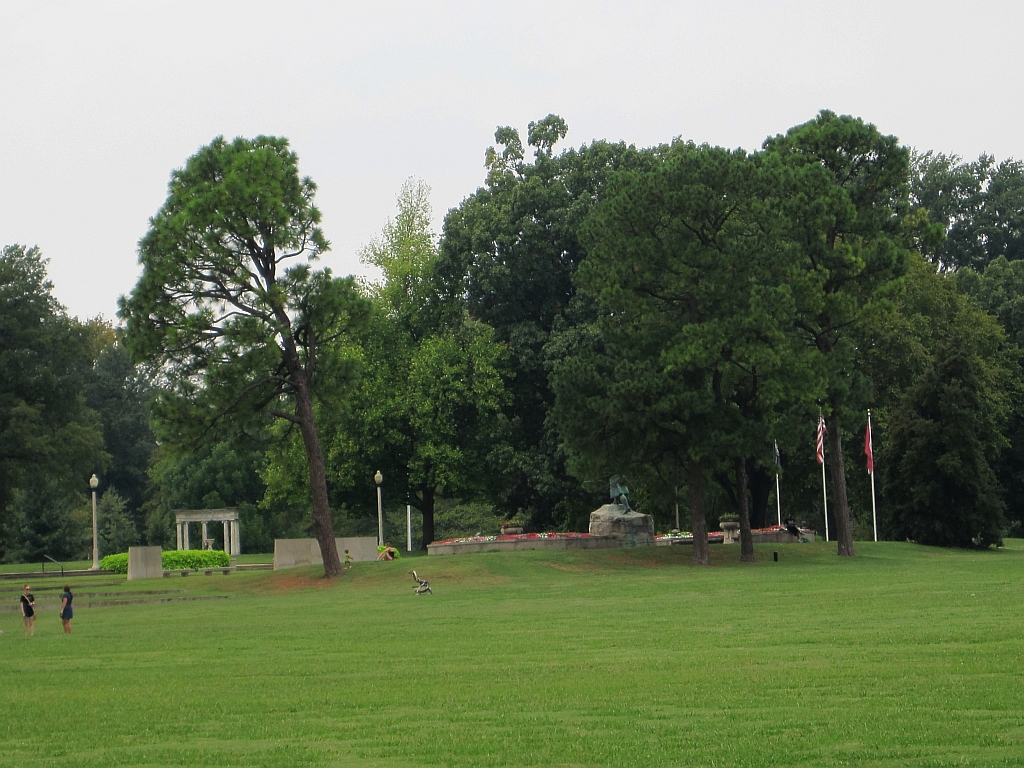
Greensward and Veterans Plaza viewed from Rainbow Lake

Bounded by Veterans Plaza, Rainbow Lake, the Memphis Zoo, and the golf course, the Greensward is one of the largest open areas (21 acres or 8.5 ha) in Memphis with no designated purpose other than outdoor recreation.

In March 2009, the public became aware of a plan by the City of Memphis Engineering Division to reduce flooding in the Lick Creek watershed by diverting floodwater from the stream into a multi-acre detention basin in the Greensward. The $4 million detention basin would slope downward to a maximum depth of approximately 18 ft (5.5 m) and be inundated by floodwater approximately five to seven times each year. Citizens to Preserve Overton Park opposed the plan on the grounds that it would irreparably damage the park's value. The city government asserted that the public would continue to be able to enjoy the park, and that the slope of the basin would barely be noticeable to park users.

On June 9, 2009, the city decided it would not proceed with the plan for a detention basin in the Greensward. The city engineer was quoted as saying, "We think it was an appropriate plan, but we've shelved it." Instead, the city will explore two other options, one involving part of the park's golf course, the other involving construction of a berm on another part of the park grounds.

A portion of the Greensward was previously used by the Memphis Zoo for overflow parking on busy days. Starting in 2014, residents protested the arrangement due to vehicles damaging the grass. Attempts at mediation in 2016 failed due to the zoo deciding that constructing a garage would be too expensive. The situation was finally settled in 2022, with the Zoo agreeing to relocate its maintenance facilities to a former city facility on the east side of the park, with the existing maintenance area being converted into a secondary parking lot.

=== Old Forest Arboretum ===
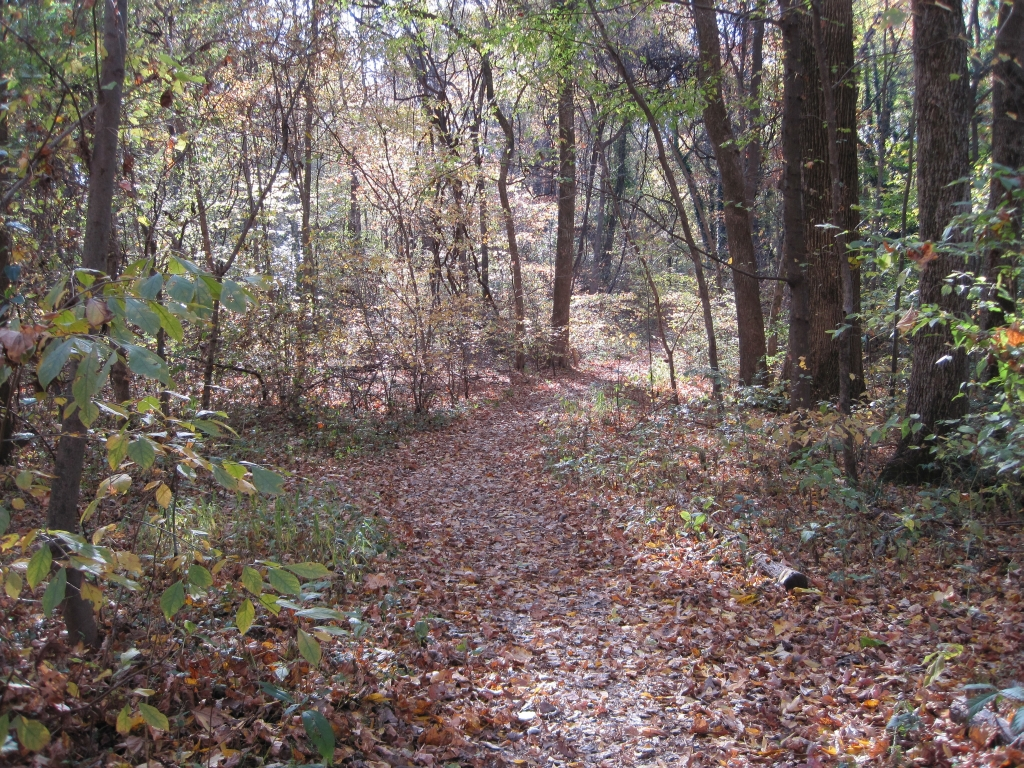
The Old Forest Trail

The Old Forest Arboretum (172 acres or 70 ha) is a forest tract and natural arboretum located on the east side of Overton Park. It is open to the public daily without charge. The Old Forest is on the National Register of Historic Places and includes over 300 plant varieties. Walking trails are maintained within the area, and markers identify 32 tree species.

On June 8, 2011, 126 acres (51 ha) of the Aboretum were designated as the "Old Forest State Natural Area" by an act of the Tennessee General Assembly. The Natural Areas Program is run by the Tennessee Department of Environment and Conservation, while the 82 natural areas themselves are often not TDEC property and are generally managed through cooperative agreements with other agencies and organizations. The bill creating the State Natural Area originally designated 142 acres (57 ha) for protection. To ease opposition from former Memphis Mayor A C Wharton and zoo officials, 14 acres (5.7 ha) of forest adjacent to the zoo were removed from the protective area.

=== Picnic areas ===
An East Picnic Area (about 15 acres or 6.1 ha) is located along the eastern boundary of Overton Park. Numerous picnic tables are located beneath a nearly continuous canopy of mature oaks. The "Picnic Pavilion" is centrally located within this area; it was designed by George Kessler and built in 1904. It is the oldest surviving facility in Overton Park. The Picnic Pavilion is wood framed with an elevated floor; it is about 60 feet (18.3 m) in diameter and has a hexagonal shape.

Scattered picnic tables are located along the borders of the Greensward and Veterans Plaza.

=== Playgrounds ===
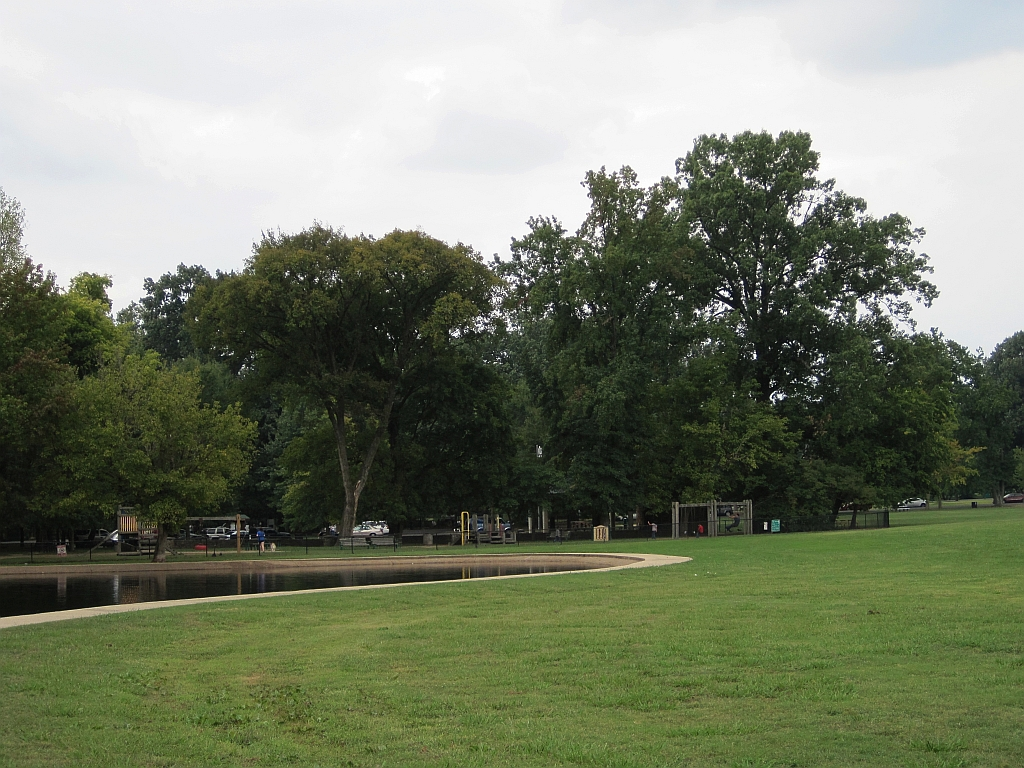
Playground area (background) and Rainbow Lake (foreground)

There are two publicly accessible playgrounds in Overton Park; one in the East Picnic Area and another to the southeast of the Greensward. The first playground in Overton Park was built in 1911; it was the first publicly accessible playground in Memphis.

=== Rainbow Lake ===
Rainbow Lake is a concrete-lined lake forming the eastern boundary of the Greensward. This 2-acre (0.81 ha) lake has a curvilinear shape and has a water cascade on its east side. A sidewalk completely goes around the lake. Its name comes from the rainbow effect created by a series of spray-type fountains (no longer present) installed in the lake in 1929. It is the only remaining water feature from George Kessler's original plan.

=== Veterans Plaza ===
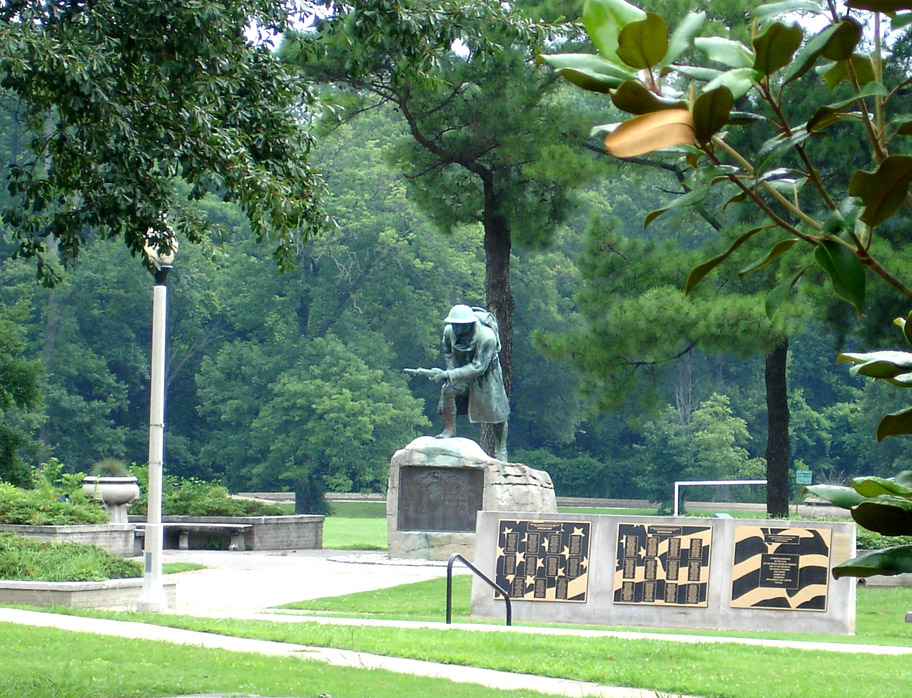
Veterans Plaza

Veterans Plaza contains memorials to the veterans of Memphis and Shelby County who were killed defending the freedom of the United States. It is located south of the Memphis Zoo and west of the Greensward. The 2-acre (0.81 ha) area is home to a collection of memorials: World War I (established 1926 and 1932), World War II (2001), Korean War (2003), Vietnam War (2003), and Desert Storm (2003). A plaque providing the history of Veterans Plaza states that "... through these memorials we pay honor to 1,525 Shelby County veterans who were killed in the 20th and 21st century wars." An adjoining plaque provides commendation for Pete Dugan, a World War II veteran, "... honoring his steadfast commitment to the cause of Veterans Plaza in Overton Park."

The Doughboy statue, which is the hallmark of the area, is one of the World War I memorials; it was made in 1926 of copper from pennies that were collected by local school children. The statue was designed and constructed by sculptor Nancy Hahn at a cost of $15,000; it was sponsored by Daughters of the American Revolution. The "Memory Grove" Memorial was created in 1932 by the American War Mothers (Memphis Chapter No. 1) to honor their sons killed in World War I. The bronze plaque has 27 names, which also appear in the Shelby County list on the pedestal of the nearby Doughboy statue. The Memory Grove Memorial was initially located on the south boundary of Overton Park within view of Poplar Avenue; it was later moved to Veterans Plaza. A statue of Margaret Polk, the namesake of the Memphis Belle, honors the B-17 bomber and its crew; the memorial was unveiled in October 2011 and was sponsored by The Memphis Belle Memorial Association.

Memorials for World War II, Korean War, Vietnam War, and Desert Storm consist of two white limestone walls with bronze panels bearing the names of the Shelby County war dead. In addition, a series of five bronze panels provide detailed information on the Korean War.

== Memorials ==
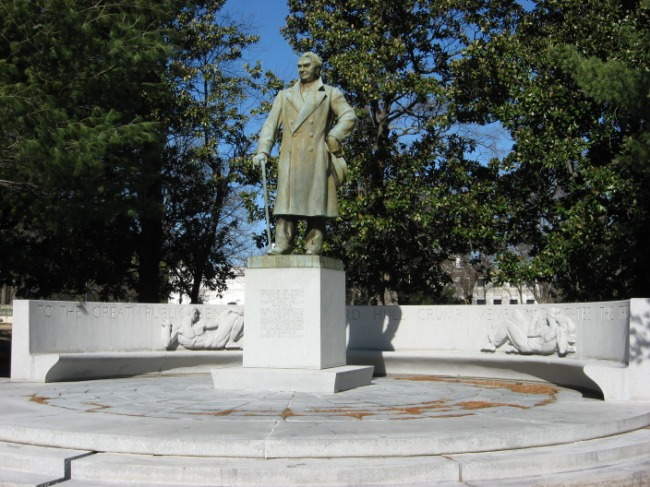
E.H. Crump Statue

A number of memorials honoring Memphians for their meritorious service to the community are located within Overton Park.

- Higbee Memorial (located just west of Veterans Plaza): It honors Jenny M. Higbee as a distinguished Memphis educator. Built in 1908, it is the oldest memorial in Overton Park. It was moved to its current location around 1956 to make way for the new Memphis College of Arts building.
- J.T. Willingham Fountain (south of Brooks Museum; built 1917) honors a long-term Memphis Park Commission member, who served at least one term as chairman. It consists of six columns in a hexagonal pattern, concrete benches, and a drinking fountain.
- Bell Tower (located just south of Memphis College of Arts): a 1930 memorial to Judge L. B. McFarland, one of the original members of the Memphis Park Commission.
- E.H. Crump Statue (located at southeastern park entrance; built 1957): Crump was Memphis Mayor from 1910 through 1915 and U.S. Representative in 1930.

== Notable bygone features ==
The Main Pavilion was the principal gathering place in Overton Park from its construction in 1902 until it was damaged beyond repair by a storm in 1936. It was the first building built in Overton Park. The Formal Garden and Conway Memorial were later built in association with the Main Pavilion, which was located at the east entrance to the Formal Garden. Frequent public dances, concerts, and civic events were held at the Pavilion. One of the best attended presentations was when Charles Lindbergh spoke on the future of aviation on October 5, 1927, as part of the "Lindbergh Tour". The Pavilion had an observation tower providing scenic views of the surrounding landscape. After its demise, visitor use shifted to the recently constructed Overton Park Shell.

In 1914, the Japanese Garden was built around an existing pond in Overton Park, where the Memphis College of Arts is currently located. It was a gift from former Memphis Park Commissioner Robert Galloway. George Kessler, who designed Overton Park, also designed the Japanese Garden, which included pagodas, an arched bridge to a central island, and many decorative sculptures. This area was a popular and highly photographed feature of Overton Park. After the attack on Pearl Harbor, the Garden was severely damaged by vandalism. Park officials decided that rather than making repairs the structures would be removed, which began on January 2, 1942. A fountain was installed in the redesigned pond, which was retained until construction began on the Memphis College of Arts campus.

Donated by Duke C. Bower, the Bower Wading Pool complemented the summer activities at Overton Park from 1913 until the 1970s. It was filled in during an expansion of the playground in 1979.

== See also ==
- List of contemporary amphitheatres
