= Ya Ya (giant panda) =

Female giant panda (born 2003)

Ya Ya 丫丫
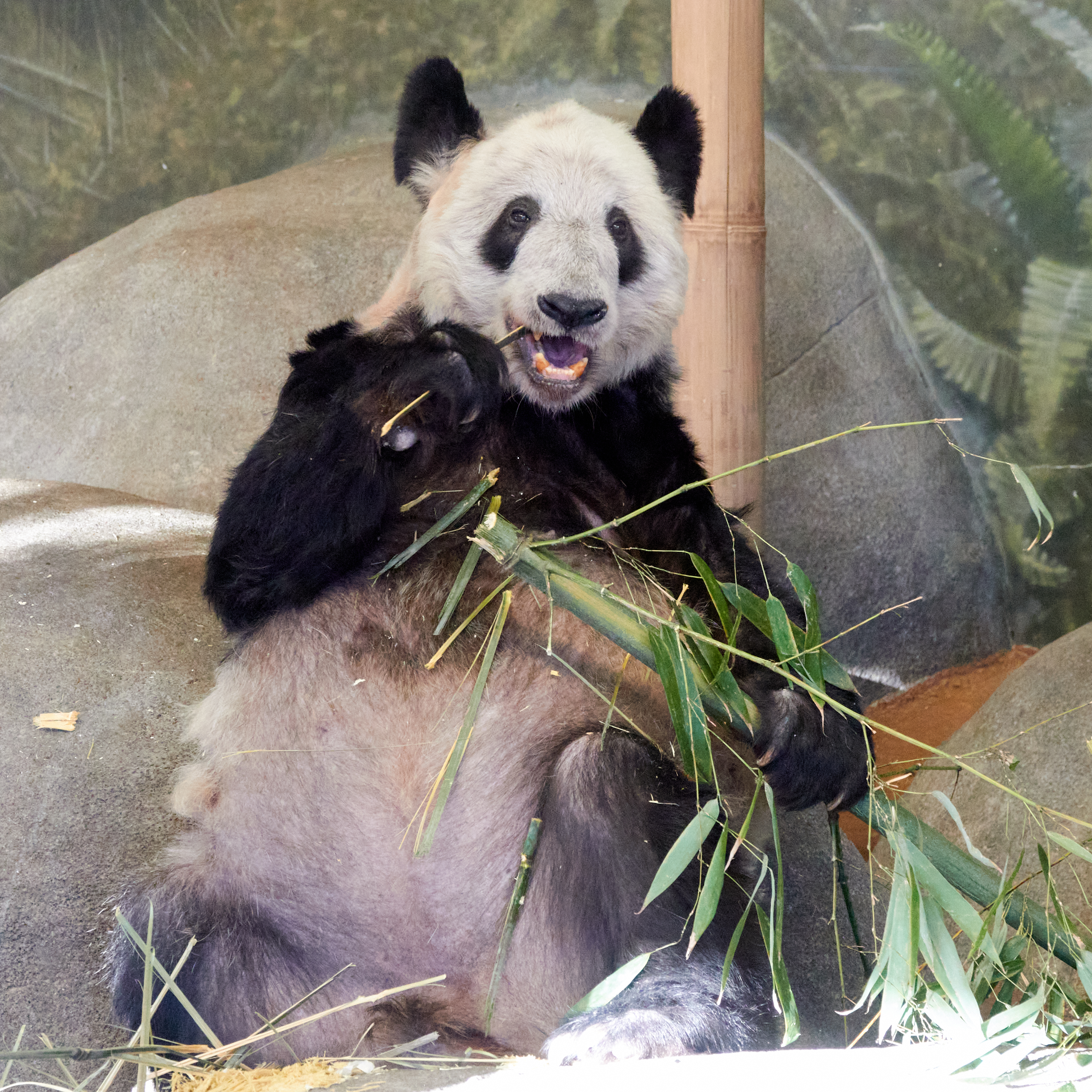
- Ya Ya eating bamboo in 2022
- Species: Giant panda (Ailuropoda melanoleuca)
- Sex: Female
- Born: August 3, 2000 (age 26); Beijing Zoo
- Residence: Beijing Zoo (2000–2003, 2023–present); Memphis Zoo (2003–2023)

Ya Ya (Note: Chinese: 丫丫; pinyin: Yā Yā) (born August 3, 2000) is a female giant panda who once lived at the Memphis Zoo and returned to China on a freight plane on April 27, 2023, due to health concerns.

== Life and Memphis Zoo ==
Ya Ya was born at the Beijing Zoo on August 3, 2000. In April 1999, the Memphis Zoo in Tennessee signed an agreement with the China Zoo Association to borrow two pandas from China. Ya Ya and another panda, Le Le, (Note: Chinese: 乐乐; pinyin: Lè Lè) arrived at the Memphis Zoo on April 7, 2003. In 2013, after the 10-year deal expired, the two countries extended the lease for another 10 years until April 2023. In December 2022, Memphis Zoo announced the return of Ya Ya and Le Le to China. During her stay at Memphis, she suffered hair loss caused by chronic Demodex ailuropodae, which changes seasonally and is affected by hormonal fluctuations.

According to the China Zoo Association, Ya Ya's tooth condition is very good for her age and her chewing ability is good. Immediately upon arrival at the Memphis Zoo, Ya Ya's hair was found to be different from that of other pandas, and a skin scraper was conducted to examine Ya Ya's mother for mite skin disease, but no mites were found. In 2006, Memphis Zoo staff negotiated with Beijing panda experts to treat her with anti-parasitic drugs for four months, but the condition remained the same. Since then, she has had a skin scraping test every year. In the March 2014 examination, the skin scraper found a mite. The skin still did not improve after treatment, but no further mites were detected in subsequent years of examination.

On June 9, 2021, the China Zoo Association organized an evaluation of Ya Ya's health at the Chengdu Research Base of Giant Panda Breeding, the China Panda Conservation Research Center and the Beijing Zoo. The results showed that the color of the skin was dry and rusty all over the body, the hair was uneven in some parts, and another mite infection was detected.

== Allegations and departure ==
In February 2023, following the death of fellow panda Le Le, some Chinese citizens called for Ya Ya to quickly return to China due to concerns for her health. According to The Straits Times and What's on Weibo, some Chinese netizens accused the Memphis Zoo of abusing Ya Ya, citing her malnourished appearance as evidence. The Beijing Zoo said it had made full preparations for the panda's eventual arrival. The team examined her physical examination report and monthly health report. The assessment concluded that besides hair loss caused by skin disease, Ya Ya had good appetite, normal fecal characteristics and stable weight. China issued import licenses and quarantine permits, identified quarantine sites, and made relevant preparations.

The cargo plane carrying Ya Ya took off from Memphis International Airport on April 26, 2023, and landed at Shanghai Pudong Airport on April 27. On May 29, Ya Ya returned to the Giant Panda House of the Beijing Zoo. Her return marked declining China–United States relations.

== See also ==
- List of individual giant pandas
