= Citizens to Preserve Overton Park =

Advocacy group in Memphis, Tennessee

Citizens to Preserve Overton Park (CPOP) was a 501(c)(4) nonprofit advocacy group founded in Memphis, Tennessee, in 1957. CPOP is best known for its success at preventing the extension of Interstate 40 through Overton Park adjacent to the Memphis Zoo, through the landmark 1971 Supreme Court case Citizens to Preserve Overton Park v. Volpe. The nonprofit status was revoked by the IRS on 15th of May 2010.

On March 8, 2008, the organization was reincorporated in response to the Zoo's clear-cutting of a portion of the adjacent Old Forest Arboretum in Overton Park and the enclosing of additional park sections within a security fence in preparation for future expansion.

A year later, in March 2009, CPOP found itself in the public eye once again, opposing plans by the City of Memphis, Tennessee Engineering Division to create a floodwater retention basin in an extensive, flat, and much-used section of Overton Park, the Greensward.
