= Citizens to Preserve Overton Park v. Volpe =

- Supreme Court of the United States

Argued January 11, 1971 Decided March 2, 1971
- Full case name: Citizens to Preserve Overton Park, et al. v. Volpe, Secretary of Transportation, et al.
- Citations: 401 U.S. 402 (more) 91 S. Ct. 814; 28 L. Ed. 2d 136; 1971 U.S. LEXIS 96

Case history
- Prior: Summary judgment for defendant, injunction denied, 309 F. Supp. 1189 (W.D. Tenn. 1970); aff'd, 432 F.2d 1307 (6th Cir. 1970); cert. granted, 400 U.S. 939 (1970).
- Subsequent: On remand to 335 F. Supp. 873 (W.D. Tenn. 1972)

Holding
- The Secretary of Transportation can only approve use of federal funds for construction of a highway in a public park (a) if no feasible and prudent alternative exists, and (b) after undertaking all possible planning to minimize harm.

Court membership
- Chief Justice Warren E. Burger Associate Justices Hugo Black · William O. Douglas; John M. Harlan II · William J. Brennan Jr. Potter Stewart · Byron White; Thurgood Marshall · Harry Blackmun

Case opinions
- Majority: Marshall, joined by Burger, Harlan, Stewart, White, Blackmun
- Concurrence: Blackmun
- Dissent: Black, joined by Brennan
- Douglas took no part in the consideration or decision of the case.

Laws applied
- Administrative Procedure Act; Department of Transportation Act § 4(f), codified at 49 U.S.C. § 1653(f); Federal-Aid Highway Act § 138, codified at 23 U.S.C. § 138

Citizens to Preserve Overton Park v. Volpe, 401 U.S. 402 (1971), is a landmark decision by the Supreme Court of the United States that established the basic legal framework for judicial review of the actions of administrative agencies. It substantially narrowed the Administrative Procedure Act's Section 701(a)(2) exception from judicial review. It also stands as a notable example of the power of litigation by grassroots citizen movements to block government action.

== Background ==
The case concerned the decision by the Secretary of Transportation John A. Volpe to approve the construction of Interstate 40 through Overton Park in Memphis, Tennessee pursuant to his powers under the Department of Transportation Act of 1966 and the Federal-Aid Highway Act of 1968. These acts prohibited the Secretary from financing interstate construction through public parks if a "feasible and prudent" alternative route existed. Further, if no alternative route was found by the secretary, the secretary could only allow the construction through the park if "all possible planning to minimize harm" had been conducted.

During the Interstate Highway System building boom of the late 1950s and early 1960s, public parks were viewed as desirable construction sites because approval did not require invocation of eminent domain. That changed after passage of the Department of Transportation Act of 1966, which required the government to demonstrate that there were no "feasible and prudent" alternatives to building through public lands.

== Procedural history ==
After Secretary Volpe approved the Tennessee Department of Highways proposal to construct the highway through Overton Park, a group called Citizens to Preserve Overton Park brought suit against him in the Western District of Tennessee for violation of § 4(f) of the Department of Transportation Act. The Secretary responded by filing a motion for summary judgment, which was granted by the District Court. On appeal, the 6th Circuit affirmed the grant of summary judgment. At the Supreme Court, the case was "decided on an expedited timetable".

== Decision ==
On March 3, 1971, the U.S. Supreme Court reversed the Circuit Court and held that summary judgment was improperly granted. While the Secretary was not required to make formal findings, the Secretary's sole reliance on litigation affidavits was insufficient in light of the "feasible and prudent" clause of § 4(f). The Court held that the Secretary's decision did not fall into the Administrative Procedure Act (APA)'s Section 701(a)(2) exception from judicial review for action "committed to agency discretion." The Court stated that the exception was "very narrow" and that it was applicable when statutes were "drawn in such broad terms that in a given case there is no law to apply." This marked the Court's first general explanation of Section 701(a)(2). Because the agency's decision was classified as informal adjudication, the Court found that it would be reviewed under the "arbitrary or capricious" standard of review under Section 706.

Justice Thurgood Marshall, writing for the Court, held § 4(f) "is a plain and explicit bar to the use of federal funds for construction of highways through parks; only the most unusual situations are exempted." The Court rejected the Secretary's proposed understanding of "prudent" as a grant of discretion to weigh costs and benefits to determine whether alternatives exist. Because the costs of building through parks were demonstrably low, as construction before 1966 had shown, the Court held that the 1966 enactment of the "feasible and prudent" clause "indicates that protection of parkland was to be given paramount importance." The Court remanded the case to the District Court for further proceedings. Justice Black, joined by Justice Brennan, concurred in vacating the summary judgment. However, they would have remanded the case to the Secretary of Transportation rather than the District Court.

== Significance ==
Beginning with Citizens to Preserve Overton Park, Inc. v. Volpe, the Supreme Court subjected informal agency action to more searching judicial review under the Administrative Procedure Act, requiring courts to closely examine agency reasoning and to review the full administrative record supporting the agency's decision. Overton Park, though not a rulemaking case, became an important foundation for "hard-look" review after the D.C. Circuit read the decision broadly to require a more complete administrative record to permit meaningful judicial review of agency decisionmaking. It marked a shift in how lawyers attacked federal regulation, and is considered a landmark case by administrative law scholars.

Besides being the first interpretation of Section 701(a)(2) of the APA, it provided scholars with a "great deal" of information on Section 706 of the APA. Its conclusion that courts must examine the entire record of an agency's decision established the "hard look" doctrine further expanded upon by State Farm Mutual Automobile Insurance Co. v. Campbell (1983).

The "no law to apply doctrine" that originated from Overton Park "engenders confusion among courts and commentators" due to its ambiguity. It is a standard that is rarely met because Congress typically attempts to give statutory guidance to agencies.

== See also ==
- List of United States Supreme Court cases, volume 401
