= Geography of Memphis, Tennessee =

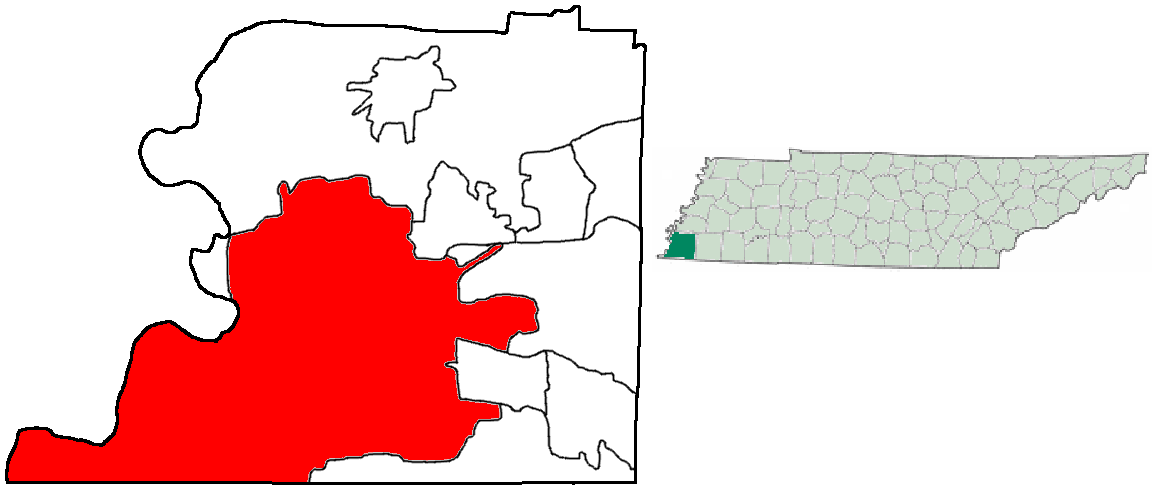
Location in Shelby County and the state of Tennessee

The City of Memphis is located on the eastern bank of the Mississippi River in the southwest corner of the U.S. state of Tennessee. It is the regional hub for a tri-state area of Arkansas, Mississippi and Tennessee.

Shelby County is located over four natural aquifers, one of which is recognized as the "Memphis sand aquifer" or simply as the "Memphis aquifer." This particular water source is stated to contain more than 100 trillion gallons (380 km^{3}) of water.

Memphis has a humid subtropical climate, with four distinct seasons. The summer months are persistently hot and humid due to moisture encroaching from the Gulf of Mexico.

== Geography ==
Memphis is located in southwestern Tennessee at 35°7′3″N 89°58′16″W. The city sits on the eastern bank of the Mississippi River at the site of the 4th Chickasaw Bluff, just south of the mouth of the Wolf River. According to the United States Census Bureau, the city has a total area of 294.8 sq mi (763.4 km^{2}), of which 279.3 sq mi (723.4 km^{2}) is land and 15.4 sq mi (40.0 km^{2}), or 5.24%, is water.

=== Cityscape ===
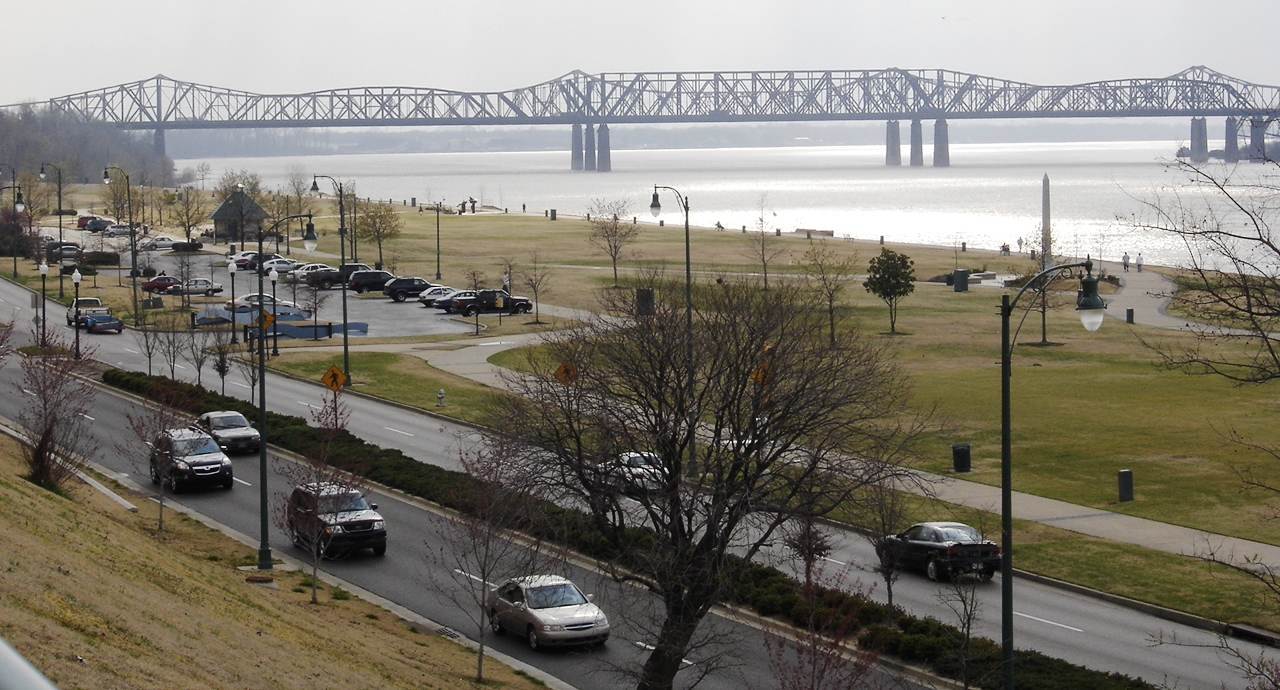
Three bridges over the Mississippi, view from Tom Lee Park (2007)

The city of Memphis It is the regional hub for a tri-state area of Arkansas, Mississippi and Tennessee. The city center is located on the Mississippi river at the site of the earliest settlements.

Interstate 40 enters the city from the northeast, and loops above the central part of the city, exiting across the Mississippi River and traveling to the west. Interstate 55 approaches the city from the south and connects with Interstate 240 which, along with I-40, creates the Inner Beltway. Interstate 269 is Memphis' Outer Beltway, traveling from Millington to Hernando via Arlington, Collierville, Piperton, and Byhalia. Upon completion, Interstate 69 will enter Memphis from Southaven along I-55. It will continue north on I-240 and then onto I-40, where it will branch off at SR-300 to continue north towards Dyersburg. Interstate 22 will eventually travel along US-78 from Birmingham to just outside Memphis and is expected to be named sometime in 2015.

U.S. Highway 72 leaves the city traveling to the southeast. The west end of U.S. Highway 78 begins in Memphis on Martin Luther King, Jr. Avenue at the intersection of 2nd Street. As it leaves Memphis, US 78 follows Lamar Avenue, historically known as Pidgeon Roost Road for the nestings of passenger pigeons formerly in the vicinity. The east end of U.S. Highway 78 terminates in Charleston, South Carolina.

=== Tallest buildings ===
Name	Stories	Height
100 North Main	37	430 ft (130 m)
Clark Tower Executive Suites	32	400 ft (120 m)
One Commerce Square	31	396 ft (121 m)
Sterick Building	31	365 ft (111 m)

=== Current Geographical Boundaries ===
Memphis has expanded its city limits several times within the past half-century due to annexation. The current boundaries (as of December 2012) are roughly as follows:

- Mississippi River as the west boundary.
- The Loosahatchie River, Raleigh-Millington Road over to Egypt-Central Road, then bordering Bartlett, Tennessee, Lakeland, Tennessee, and Arlington, Tennessee as a north boundary over to the Fayette County, Tennessee line.
- A half mile line south of U.S. Route 64, over to Berryhill Road, Macon Road, Rocky Point Road, Walnut Grove Road to east of Forest Hill-Irene Road, south to the Wolf River and following the Germantown, Tennessee border as an east boundary.
- An irregular line including and running east of the Southwind Golf Course (see below), to Nonconnah Creek, Germantown Road, Shelby Drive, Riverdale Road, Holmes Road, Crumpler Road, to the Mississippi State line running to the river as a south boundary.

An area within those boundaries that has not been annexed by the city of Memphis is a neighborhood known as the Bridgewater area, roughly bounded by I-40 to the north, Germantown Parkway to the east, Shelby Farms to the south and Whitten Road to the west. Memphis did try to annex this area in the mid-2000s but held it off due to an inability to move services into the area.

Per Tennessee law, each county is required to set up urban growth boundaries for it cities. Because of this, Memphis (along with each suburb) has what is known as an annexation reserve that defines the eventual city limits. This annexation reserve includes an area between the Big Creek Drainage Canal up to the southern border of Millington, Tennessee and western border of Bartlett, an area between Lakeland, Arlington, Fayette County, and Collierville, Tennessee, and then a small portion of land south of the Southwind area mentioned above.

=== Sections and suburbs ===
The core of Memphis is marked by five major districts, with smaller districts lying within their borders. These are Downtown, Midtown, North Memphis, South Memphis, and East Memphis. In recent decades, the city has expanded further by annexing adjacent territories, so these names can be somewhat misleading to those who are unfamiliar to the area.

Sections and neighborhoods:

- Annesdale Park
- Annesdale Snowden
- Belle Meade
- Berclair
- Binghampton
- Buntyn
- Central Gardens
- Chickasaw Gardens
- Cooper-Young
- Cordova
- Douglass
- Downtown
- East Memphis
- Evergreen
- Frayser
- Glenview
- Harbor Town
- Hickory Hill
- Highpoint Terrace
- Hillshire
- Hollywood
- Hyde Park
- Idlewild
- Laurelwood
- Lenox
- Medical District
- Midtown
- Mud Island
- Normal Station
- North Memphis
- Nutbush
- Orange Mound
- Parkway Village
- Raleigh
- Richwood
- Scenic Hills
- South Bluffs
- South Main Arts District
- South Memphis (see Southside)
- Southwind
- The Village, East Memphis
- Uptown
- Victorian Village
- Watkins & Brown
- Westwood
- Whitehaven
- Wolfchase
- Walkerhomes
- Scutterfeld

== Geology ==
Memphis is located within the Mississippi Embayment, an area composed of unconsolidated sand, silt, clay and gravel. As mentioned above, Downtown Memphis sits upon the 4th Chickasaw Bluff. These bluffs are composed of windblown silt, or loess. The highest point of this bluff is located south of downtown, slightly losing elevation towards the north approaching Mud Island and the Wolf River. This windblown silt gradually tapers off in thickness as one moves towards the east. Areas in the eastern portion of the city start to see more sand and gravel, which underlies this loess.

Three main waterways traverse Memphis. Nonconnah Creek drains the southern portion of the city, the Wolf River drains the central portions of the city, and the Loosahatchie River drains the northern portion of the city, also forming much of the northern city limits. As typical of many waterways within West Tennessee, these waterways and their tributaries have been channelized in the 20th century. Many tributaries within the center of Memphis have been concrete-lined or covered in box culverts. The main waterways also have relatively wide floodplains. Relatively low ridges form between these waterways, one of which roughly follows Poplar Avenue and another roughly runs through the Frayser and Raleigh neighborhoods.

Being in West Tennessee and the Mississippi Embayment, for which limestone bedrock is thousands of feet below the surface, topographic relief is not as great as in the rest of Tennessee, but due to the windblown loess and erosion though the layer, some areas of relatively steep but low hills can be found within the city. The lowest elevation within Memphis can be found at the Mississippi River at the southwest corner of the city at around 178 (also Tennessee's lowest point and the southwest corner of the state), which varies upon the river level. The city's highest natural point is around 400-410 feet based on USGS quadrangle maps and is located south of Holmes Road, east of Tchulahoma Road, west of Getwell Road, and north of the state line.

=== Aquifer ===
Memphis and Shelby County are located over four natural aquifers, one of which is recognized as the "Memphis sand aquifer" or simply as the "Memphis aquifer". This particular water source, located some 350 to 1100 ft (100 – 330 m) underground, is stated to contain more than 100 trillion gallons (380 km^{3}) of water by Memphis Light, Gas, and Water, which draws, verifies the cleanliness of, and distributes the water to over 250,000 customers.

Furthermore, in the time since the tapping of the well in 1887, the aquifer has only descended 125 ft (38 m), suggesting a reliable water source in Memphis for years to come.

Most Memphians recognize this as their primary water source, and take great regional pride in their possession of the aquifer. This includes protecting it against potential contaminants, as occurred in 2021 with the Byhalia Pipeline protests. Memphis water is notably soft, low in mineral content, and free of toxic substances.

== Climate ==
Memphis

Climate chart (precipitation, max. and min. temperature)
J	F	M	A	M	J	J	A	S	O	N	D
4 50 33	4.4 55 36	5.2 64 44	5.5 73 53	5.3 81 62	3.6 89 70	4.6 92 74	2.9 91 73	3.1 85 65	4 74 54	5.5 63 44	5.7 52 35
- █ Average max. and min. temperatures in °F
- █ Precipitation totals in inches
- Source: NOAA
Metric conversion
J	F	M	A	M	J	J	A	S	O	N	D
101 10 0	112 13 2	131 18 7	140 23 12	133 27 17	92 32 21	117 33 23	73 33 23	78 30 18	101 24 12	139 17 7	146 11 2
- █ Average max. and min. temperatures in °C
- █ Precipitation totals in mm

Memphis has a humid subtropical climate (Köppen Cfa), with four distinct seasons, and is located in USDA Plant Hardiness Zone 8, as compared to most of the state, which is located in Zone 7. Historically, April is the month with the highest frequency of tornadoes, though tornadoes have occurred every month of the year. Memphis is sunny approximately 65% of the time, with monthly percent possible sunshine ranging from 50% in December to 74% in June thru August. The normal annual mean temperature is 63.0 °F (17.2 °C); the coolest year was 1917 with a mean of 59.6 °F (15.3 °C), while the warmest 2012 at 65.9 °F (18.8 °C). (Note: On the warm end, 1928, 1929 and 1940 were discounted due to missing data in at least one month in each of those years.) Precipitation averages 53.68 in (1,363 mm) annually, falling on 108 days, with a slight lull from August to October; historically, annual precipitation has ranged from 33.44 in (849 mm) in 1916 to 76.85 in (1,952 mm) in 1957.

=== Spring ===
Spring often begins in late February or early March, following the onset of a sharp warmup. This season is also known as "severe weather season" due to the higher frequency of tornadoes, hail, and thunderstorms producing winds greater than 58 miles per hour (93 km/h). Average rainfall is slightly higher during each of the spring months exceeds 5 in (127 mm), making it the wettest season, but relative humidity is at its lowest. The average last freeze of spring falls on March 19, while the first 90 °F (32 °C)+ high can be expected on May 23.

=== Summer ===
The summer months (late May to late September) are dominated by temperatures between 68 and 95 °F (20 and 35 °C), and humidity due to moisture encroaching from the Gulf of Mexico. Afternoon thunderstorms are frequent during some summers, but usually brief, lasting no longer than an hour. On average, annually there are 70 days of 90 °F (32 °C)+ highs, and 2.7 days of 100 °F (38 °C)+ highs. (Note: The annual number of 90 °F+ days has ranged from 19 in 1906 to 109 in 1954; the summer of 1980 saw 33 days of 100 °F+ temperatures.) The highest recorded temperature was 108 °F (42 °C) on July 13, 1980; the highest minimum temperature is 84 °F (29 °C), occurring as recently as August 3, 2010. The hottest month on record was July 1980 with a daily mean of 88.8 °F (31.6 °C), but as measured by monthly average high temperature, August 2007 was the hottest at 98.9 °F (37.2 °C).

=== Autumn ===
Early Autumn sees a slight reduction in relative humidity levels, but daytime temperatures remain warm into late October. Abrupt but short-lived cold snaps are common. Late Autumn is rainier and colder, with December on average recording the most rain of any month. Fall foliage becomes especially vibrant after the first frost, typically November, and lasts until early December. The average last 90 °F (32 °C)+ high of the warm season falls on September 22, while the average first freeze of autumn falls on November 14, yielding a growing season of 240 days.

=== Winter ===
Winters are mild, but cold snaps can occur; on average there are 47 days annually with a low at or below freezing, and 4.7 days with a high at or below freezing. The official all-time record low temperature was −13 °F (−25 °C), which occurred on December 24, 1963, while the lowest daily maximum temperature on record is 6 °F (−14 °C) on January 10, 1962; the coldest month on record was January 1918 with an average of 27.6 °F (−2.4 °C). However, from December to February, there is an average of 6.3 days of 70 °F (21 °C)+ highs. Snowfall is not abundant but does occur during most winters, with a seasonal average of 3.8 in (9.7 cm) at the airport. Snowfall has ranged from zero in the three consecutive winters ending in 1947−48 to 25.1 in (64 cm) in 1917−18. Although March is a transition month, the largest daily snowfall was 18.0 in (46 cm) on March 17, 1892. The most significant snow in many years fell on March 8, 2008 when 7 inches blanketed the city. While severe weather is more common in Spring, notable severe weather has occurred in winter. On February 5, 2008 a tornado killed 3 in Memphis during the 2008 Super Tuesday tornado outbreak.

=== Monthly normals and record temperatures ===
Climate data for Memphis (Memphis Int'l), 1991−2020 normals, (Note: Mean monthly maxima and minima (i.e. the expected highest and lowest temperature readings at any point during the year or given month) calculated based on data at said location from 1991 to 2020.) extremes 1875−present (Note: Official records for Memphis were kept at downtown from January 1875 to December 1939 and at Memphis Int'l since January 1940.)
Month	Jan	Feb	Mar	Apr	May	Jun	Jul	Aug	Sep	Oct	Nov	Dec	Year
Record high °F (°C)	79 (26)	81 (27)	87 (31)	94 (34)	99 (37)	104 (40)	108 (42)	107 (42)	103 (39)	98 (37)	86 (30)	81 (27)	108 (42)
Mean maximum °F (°C)	70.5 (21.4)	73.5 (23.1)	80.2 (26.8)	85.3 (29.6)	90.7 (32.6)	95.9 (35.5)	98.1 (36.7)	98.5 (36.9)	95.3 (35.2)	88.5 (31.4)	79.1 (26.2)	71.4 (21.9)	99.9 (37.7)
Mean daily maximum °F (°C)	50.9 (10.5)	55.5 (13.1)	64.2 (17.9)	73.4 (23.0)	81.7 (27.6)	89.4 (31.9)	91.9 (33.3)	91.5 (33.1)	86.0 (30.0)	75.1 (23.9)	62.6 (17.0)	53.4 (11.9)	73.0 (22.8)
Daily mean °F (°C)	42.1 (5.6)	46.1 (7.8)	54.2 (12.3)	63.2 (17.3)	72.1 (22.3)	79.9 (26.6)	82.8 (28.2)	82.1 (27.8)	76.0 (24.4)	64.6 (18.1)	52.7 (11.5)	44.8 (7.1)	63.4 (17.4)
Mean daily minimum °F (°C)	33.3 (0.7)	36.7 (2.6)	44.3 (6.8)	53.0 (11.7)	62.4 (16.9)	70.4 (21.3)	73.6 (23.1)	72.6 (22.6)	65.9 (18.8)	54.0 (12.2)	42.9 (6.1)	36.2 (2.3)	53.8 (12.1)
Mean minimum °F (°C)	16.0 (−8.9)	20.8 (−6.2)	26.3 (−3.2)	37.3 (2.9)	48.4 (9.1)	60.4 (15.8)	67.0 (19.4)	64.8 (18.2)	52.4 (11.3)	38.0 (3.3)	27.3 (−2.6)	21.1 (−6.1)	13.6 (−10.2)
Record low °F (°C)	−8 (−22)	−11 (−24)	12 (−11)	27 (−3)	36 (2)	48 (9)	52 (11)	48 (9)	36 (2)	25 (−4)	9 (−13)	−13 (−25)	−13 (−25)
Average precipitation inches (mm)	4.14 (105)	4.55 (116)	5.74 (146)	5.87 (149)	5.27 (134)	3.99 (101)	4.82 (122)	3.37 (86)	3.03 (77)	3.98 (101)	4.69 (119)	5.49 (139)	54.94 (1,395)
Average snowfall inches (cm)	0.9 (2.3)	1.0 (2.5)	0.5 (1.3)	0.0 (0.0)	0.0 (0.0)	0.0 (0.0)	0.0 (0.0)	0.0 (0.0)	0.0 (0.0)	0.0 (0.0)	0.1 (0.25)	0.2 (0.51)	2.7 (6.9)
Average precipitation days (≥ 0.01 in)	10.0	9.9	11.5	9.6	10.6	8.9	9.5	7.6	7.1	7.5	9.0	10.2	111.4
Average snowy days (≥ 0.1 in)	1.0	0.8	0.3	0.0	0.0	0.0	0.0	0.0	0.0	0.0	0.2	0.3	2.6
Average relative humidity (%)	68.2	66.4	63.2	62.5	66.4	66.8	69.1	69.6	71.3	66.2	67.7	68.8	67.2
Average dew point °F (°C)	28.6 (−1.9)	31.8 (−0.1)	39.4 (4.1)	48.6 (9.2)	58.3 (14.6)	65.7 (18.7)	70.0 (21.1)	68.5 (20.3)	63.1 (17.3)	50.2 (10.1)	41.0 (5.0)	32.7 (0.4)	49.8 (9.9)
Mean monthly sunshine hours	166.6	173.8	215.3	254.6	301.5	320.6	326.9	307.0	251.2	245.9	173.0	151.9	2,888.3
Percentage possible sunshine	53	57	58	65	69	74	74	74	68	70	56	50	65
Average ultraviolet index	2.4	3.7	5.6	7.5	8.8	9.5	9.7	8.8	7.1	4.8	3.0	2.2	6.0
Source 1: NOAA (relative humidity and dew point 1961−1990, sun 1961−1987)
Source 2: UV Index Today (1995 to 2022)

== Sister cities ==
Memphis has two sister cities, as designated by Sister Cities International:

- (The Gambia) Kanifing, Gambia
- Kaolack, Senegal

== Landmarks ==
- 35°09′11″N 90°03′53″W – Hernando de Soto Bridge (I-40)
- 35°09′08″N 90°02′40″W – St. Jude Children's Research Hospital
- 35°08′52″N 90°03′06″W – 100 North Main Street, Tallest Building in Memphis
- 35°08′22″N 90°03′06″W – Beale Street Visitors Center
- 35°08′20″N 90°02′15″W – Sun Studio
- 35°08′03″N 90°03′28″W – Lorraine Motel
- 35°07′23″N 90°04′31″W – National Ornamental Metal Museum
- 35°02′51″N 90°01′29″W – Graceland Mansion
- 35°8′2″N 90°3′45″W – Tennessee Brewery
- 35°07'33.5"N 89°57'35.6"W -- Memphis Pink Palace Museum
