= Grace-St. Luke's Episcopal School =

Location
- 246 S Belvedere, Memphis, Tennessee, USA 38104
- 35°07′58″N 90°00′17″W

Information
- Religious affiliation: Episcopalianism
- Established: 1947; 79 years ago
- Grades: 18 months - 8th grade
- Colors: Red and Black
- Mascot: St. Bernard dog "Luke"
- Nickname: Saints
- Website: www.gslschool.org

Grace-St. Luke's Episcopal School is a co-educational, independent school in Memphis, Tennessee, United States, for students aged 18 months through 8th grade.

== History ==
Located in the historic Central Gardens neighborhood in Midtown, Memphis, Grace-St. Luke's (GSL), was founded in 1947. The school began in 1919, when Bartow B. Ramage, rector of St. Luke's Church began a parochial school for the neighborhood. His daughter Ethel Ramage would join as a teacher in 1923 after graduating from Columbia University, but closed the school in 1924 upon his retirement. It remained closed until 1947, when Mrs. S. Griffin Walker, who had taught kindergarten at St. Mary's School, asked Grace-St. Luke's rector Rev. Charles Stuart Hale for space to open a new kindergarten. He agreed, and thus it began in the basement of the parish house. Grace-St. Luke's Episcopal Day School began in earnest in 1959 when a charter was issued and the first capital fund drive began. At that time, the school offered kindergarten through 6th grade. School leaders broke ground for a new day school building on November 30, 1959.

The original Day School Building was dedicated in May 1960 by Tennessee's Episcopal Bishop Theodore Barth. Grace-St. Luke's Episcopal School continued to grow —improvements were made, and new buildings were eventually added, including Morton Hall Activities Building (and gymnasium), in 1970, and Bratton Hall in 1974, which enabled the addition of 10th, 11th, and 12th grades. But due to continuing space and program needs that were not possible to meet given the physical location of the school, high school grades were discontinued in 1979 to better focus on educational and leadership opportunities for the Lower and Middle School students. GSL went on to acquire additional properties (Snowden Athletic Field in 1984 and Miss Lee's Preschool in 1986). In the early 1990s, Grace-St. Luke's opened the Evans Building, which links the church and school administrative offices to the Middle School and gymnasium.

In 2010, the school completed its first major new construction in 20 years, and opened the Anchor Center, a multipurpose building designed to ensure the school's sustainability, and allow capacity for future growth. It houses a gymnasium, cafeteria, library, light-filled arts and music rooms, after school care space, and Middle School science labs.

Grace-St. Luke's School serves more than 450 students from age 18 months through eighth grade. It is accredited by the Southern Association of Independent Schools, and a number of other regional and national educational organizations.

The school celebrated its 75th anniversary in 2022. In 2024 Grace-St. Luke's commemorated the 100th anniversary of its historic preschool at Miss Lee's originally founded as a separate entity in 1924.

It is a feeder school to:

- Christian Brothers High School
- Memphis University School
- St. Mary's Episcopal School
- Hutchison School
- Briarcrest Christian School
- Lausanne Collegiate School
- Crosstown High School
