= Evergreen Historic District =

Evergreen Historic District may refer to:

- New Evergreen Commercial Historic District, Evergreen, AL, listed on the NRHP in Alabama
- Evergreen Historic District (Mesa, Arizona), listed on the NRHP in Maricopa County, Arizona
- Evergreen Conference District, Evergreen, CO, listed on the NRHP in Colorado
- Vollintine Evergreen Avalon Historic District, Memphis, TN, listed on the NRHP in Tennessee
- Evergreen Historic District (Memphis, Tennessee), a.k.a. Evergreen, Memphis, listed on the NRHP in Tennessee
- Vollintine Evergreen Historic District, Memphis, TN, listed on the NRHP in Tennessee
- Vollintine Evergreen North Historic District, Memphis, TN, listed on the NRHP in Tennessee
- Evergreen Avenue Historic District, East Mill Creek, UT, listed on the NRHP in Utah
