= Central Gardens =

Central Gardens can refer to:

- Central Gardens, Memphis, USA
- Central Gardens, Texas, USA
- Central Gardens Nature Reserve, a popular picnic and recreational area in Merrylands, New South Wales, Australia
