= Bettis Family Cemetery =

Family cemetery in Tennessee, USA

- Interactive map of Bettis Family Cemetery

Details
- Established: 1818
- Location: 1620 Madison Ave., Memphis, TN
- Coordinates: 35°08′22″N 90°00′23″W
- Type: Private
- No. of graves: 6
- Find a Grave: Bettis Family Cemetery

The Bettis Family Cemetery is a small, historic burial ground in Midtown Memphis, Tennessee, United States. Located at 54 Angelus Street, just north of Madison Avenue, it sits behind the Cash Saver grocery store (formerly Piggly Wiggly). This cemetery holds significant historical value.

== Bettis family ==
The Bettis family, led by Tillman and Sally Bettis, were among the earliest settlers on the Memphis bluff following the 1818 Chickasaw Treaty. They arrived in 1818, awaiting the opening of the land office and the survey of the country for land procurement. Their farm once spanned from Poplar to Union and from McNeil almost to Cooper, encompassing much of what is now Midtown Memphis. Mary Bettis, their daughter, is noted as the first child born in the new settlement.

== Significance ==
The cemetery is the final resting place of the Bettis family, among the earliest settlers in Memphis. According to a historical marker on-site, the Bettis family farmed this land before the city of Memphis was formally established. Mary Bettis is noted as the first child born in the new settlement after the 1818 treaty. Today, the Bettis Family Cemetery is a grassy plot with a few weathered headstones, some of which are broken or difficult to read. The area is not well-maintained, and visitors have reported seeing unusual items left behind, such as old shoes placed near graves. Despite its condition, the cemetery remains a poignant reminder of Memphis's early history. Over the years, the cemetery has faced neglect, with reports of overgrown vegetation and litter. In 2019, community organizations like Lifeline to Success and Blight Patrol, along with crews from Home Depot (the property's current owner), undertook cleanup efforts to restore dignity to the site. Additionally, local groups such as the Bettis Cemetery Brigade have shown interest in preserving the cemetery's legacy.
