= List of Superfund sites in Tennessee =

This is a list of Superfund sites in Tennessee designated under the Comprehensive Environmental Response, Compensation, and Liability Act (CERCLA) environmental law. The CERCLA federal law of 1980 authorized the United States Environmental Protection Agency (EPA) to create a list of polluted locations requiring a long-term response to clean up hazardous material contaminations. These locations are known as Superfund sites, and are placed on the National Priorities List (NPL).

The NPL guides the EPA in "determining which sites warrant further investigation" for environmental remediation. As of October 1, 2020, there were eighteen Superfund sites on the National Priorities List in Tennessee and three Superfund Alternative sites. Zero sites are currently proposed for entry on the list and seven others have been cleaned up and removed from it.

== Superfund sites ==
Proposed for addition to National Priorities List
Removed from Proposed National Priorities List
Deleted from National Priorities List
Superfund Alternative site

CERCLIS ID	Name	County	Reason	Proposed	Listed	Construction completed	Partially deleted	Deleted
TNN000410203	Alamo Contaminated Ground Water	Crockett	VOCs, including TCE, PCE, dichloroethene and trichloroethane have been detected in ground water in several monitoring wells and the city’s municipal wells.	03/10/2011	09/16/2011	–	–	–
TND007018799	American Creosote Works, (Jackson Plant)	Madison	Groundwater, surface water, soil and sediments were contaminated by VOCs, PAHs and heavy metals from former wood treatment operations.	10/15/1984	06/10/1986	05/24/2000	–	–
TND980729172	Amnicola Dump	Hamilton	Former dumping activities led to contamination by pesticides, PAHs, VOCs, heavy metals, PCBs, inorganic compounds and persistent organic pollutants, among other substances. Leachates had elevated levels of organic compounds and groundwater was contaminated by chromium, though municipal wells were unaffected.	12/30/1982	09/08/1983	09/28/1993	–	04/30/1996
TND980468557	Arlington Blending & Packaging	Shelby	Operations, spills and leakage at a pesticide processing facility led to soil contamination by chlordane, heptachlor, endrin, PCP and arsenic and shallow groundwater contamination by PCP and DCE. The site has been cleaned up and is now a neighborhood park.		07/22/1987	07/24/1997	–	–
TN8570024044	Arnold Engineering Development Center (USAF)	Coffee and Franklin	PCBs from the site have contaminated surface water, sediments and fish off-site. is on-site contamination by PCBs, trichloroethane, methyl chloride and toluene and spills of jet fuel, rocket fuel, CFCs, nitric acid and other substances have been reported. Site has since been removed from Proposed NPL	08/23/1994	–	–	–	–
TND044062222	Carrier Air Conditioning Co.	Shelby	Two spills contaminated soil with TCE and sediments in a wastewater lagoon were contaminated by zinc and TCE. In July 1986, TCE was found in the municipal water plant, is close to the site.	06/24/1984	02/21/1990	10/31/1995	–	–
TND987768546	Chemet Co.	Fayette	Unsecured slag piles from an antimony oxide plant contaminated soil, surface water and the fields of an adjacent school with lead, arsenic and antimony.	01/18/1994	05/31/1994	05/15/1996	–	10/09/1996
TND987768587	Clinch River Corporation	Roane	Historical investigations at the site have revealed extensive contamination in surface and subsurface soil and shallow ground water. Contamination includes elevated concentrations of site-related hazardous substances, including dioxins, furans, PAHs, polychlorinated biphenyls (PCBs), and various metals in surface and sub-surface soil. In addition, site related contaminants have been found in sediment and fish tissue within the Emory River/Watts Barr Reservoir.	09/18/2012	05/24/2013	–	–	–
TN0001890839	Copper Basin Mining District	Polk	Acidic drainage from waste materials has caused deforestation, leading to severe erosion, and led to high levels of metals in soil, sediments and surface water. Oils containing PCBs have leaked from abandoned transformers. Abandoned mine workings and deteriorating facilities and waste piles pose significant physical hazards.	–	–	–	–	–
TNN000402275	Former Custom Cleaners	Shelby	Soils, indoor air, and ground water have been contaminated with tetrachloroethylene (PCE). PCE has been found above the EPA's Safe Drinking Water Act Maximum Contaminant Levels (MCL) in ground water and at concentrations exceeding screening levels in indoor air and subsurface soil.	09/09/2016	08/03/2017	–	–	–
TND980728992	Gallaway Pits	Fayette	Unauthorized dumping in flooded former sand and gravel pits contaminated soil and surface water with pesticides, including chlordane and toxaphene, risking contamination of local private drinking water wells.	12/30/1982	09/08/1983	07/18/1995	–	04/29/1996
TND987767795	ICG Iselin Railroad Yard	Madison	Soil and sediment contamination by lead and VOCs, including vinyl chloride and benzene.	05/10/1993	12/16/1994	03/29/2000	–	01/07/2002
TND073540783	ICG (Johnston Yard)	Shelby	Soil and groundwater are contaminated by metals, petroleum products, diesel fuel, and occasional solvents and pesticides. Contamination is not at a level to threaten worker health and groundwater contamination appears localized to the site.	–	–	–	–	–
TND980729115	Lewisburg Dump	Marshall	Concerns were groundwater contamination, leachate generation and direct exposure to dumped industrial waste due to the deteriorating landfill cap.	12/30/1982	09/08/1983	09/28/1993	–	02/21/1996
TND075453688	Mallory Capacitor Co.	Wayne	Groundwater and private drinking water wells contaminated by PCBs and VOCs, including TCE and DCE.	01/22/1987	10/04/1989	09/24/1996	–	–
TN4210020570	Memphis Defense Depot (DLA)	Shelby	Ground water, sediment, soil and surface water are contaminated by substances including arsenic, dieldrin, PAHs, PCBs, PCE and TCE from operations at the Depot, closed under BRAC.	02/07/1992	10/14/1992	05/10/2010	–	–
TN0210020582	Milan Army Ammunition Plant	Carroll and Gibson	Groundwater and soil contamination by TNT and RDX. The Memphis Sand Aquifer, supplies water to 9,000 people in Milan is contaminated.	10/15/1984	07/22/1987	07/25/2017	–	–
TND980728836	Murray-Ohio Dump	Lawrence	Soil and groundwater were contaminated by heavy metals, including chromium, hexavalent chromium, nickel and zinc and by VOCs including DCE, TCE and PCE from former industrial and municipal landfill operations.	12/30/1982	09/08/1983	09/24/1998	–	–
TNSFN0407047	National Fireworks	Shelby	Soil is contaminated by arsenic, lead, zinc, chromium, dieldrin and PCBs and groundwater by PCE, TCE, DCE and perchlorate.	–	–	–	–	–
TND980558894	North Hollywood Dump	Shelby	Soil, groundwater, and pond sediments were contaminated with pesticides and heavy metals, including lead, copper and arsenic from former industrial waste dumping.	12/30/1982	09/08/1983	07/01/1997	–	12/31/1997
TN1890090003	Oak Ridge Reservation (USDOE)	Roane and Anderson	The site consists of hundreds of contaminated areas inside and around the Reservation, including three large production facilities dating from the Manhattan Project: the Oak Ridge National Laboratory, the former K-25 gaseous diffusion uranium enrichment plant and the Y-12 plant formerly enriched uranium by an electromagnetic method and now performs nuclear weapons and energy functions. Leakage from buried waste and former processing facilities has contaminated soil, groundwater, surface water and sediments with substances including base neutral acids, inorganic compounds, metals, PAHs, PCBs, pesticides, radioactive materials and VOCs. Contamination outside the Reservation is mainly of surface water and sediments.	07/14/1989	11/21/1989	–	–	–
TND096070396	Ross Metals Inc.	Fayette	Soil and surface water were contaminated by lead from a former secondary smelter. Groundwater lead contamination is being treated.	12/23/1996	04/01/1997	09/16/2004	–	–
TND987790300	Sixty One Industrial	Shelby	Former industrial activities led to groundwater contamination by vinyl chloride, TCE, PCE, antimony, arsenic, barium, iron, manganese and thallium.	–	–	–	–	–
TNN000407378	Smalley-Piper	Shelby	Soil contamination by metals including chromium, copper and lead and groundwater and surface water contamination by hexavalent chromium from former tool manufacturing. Groundwater contamination has affected the Memphis Aquifer and two Collierville municipal wells have been taken out of service as a result.	09/23/2004	04/27/2005	–	–	–
TND098071061	Smokey Mountain Smelters	Knox	The site contains an abandoned aluminum smelter and a former fertilizer manufacturing plant. Around 2,700 cubic yards of aluminum dross, contain heavy metals and water-soluble and corrosive salts such as aluminum nitride, sodium chloride and potassium chloride. There are also around 75,000 cu yd of salt cake. Groundwater is contaminated by arsenic, soils are contaminated by arsenic and PCBs and a nearby creek is contaminated by cadmium. Access to the site is unrestricted, so trespassers may come into contact with contaminants.	03/04/2010	09/29/2010	–	–	–
TNN000410686	Southside Chattanooga Lead	Hamilton	Soil in residential and communal areas were contaminated by lead from former foundry operations. Foundries gave residents spent foundry sand to use as fill material, which contained elevated amounts of lead and other heavy metals.	01/18/2018	09/13/2018	–	–	–
TND071516959	Tennessee Products	Hamilton	Soil, groundwater, surface water and sediment, including the Chattanooga Creek are contaminated by pesticides, VOCs, PAHs, metals and PCBs from uncontrolled coal tar dumping.	01/18/1994	09/29/1995	09/26/2008	–	08/16/2019
TND980559033	Velsicol Chemical Corp (Hardeman County)	Hardeman	Approximately 130,000 drums of waste from the company's Memphis pesticide plant were dumped on site, contaminating soil and groundwater with base neutral acids, pesticides, PAHs and VOCs. Contamination was found in private drinking water wells in 1979.	12/30/1982	09/08/1983	08/13/1998	–	–
TNN000410124	Walker Machine Products, Inc.	Shelby	Walker Machine Products used chlorinated solvents, including tetrachloroethene (PCE) and 1,1,1-trichloroethane (TCA), to clean the finished products. A 1987 Tennessee Occupational Safety and Health Administration (OSHA) Inspection Report stated the company was draining spent solvent onto the ground and into the sewer drain in the rear of the building. An oil/water separator was used by Walker Machine Products which handled solvent waste. The primary source of soil and ground water contamination is found in the area of the oil/water separator.	12/12/2013	05/12/2014	–	–	–
TND980844781	Wrigley Charcoal Plant	Hickman	Soil and groundwater are contaminated by wood tar chemicals, metals and VOCs from past industrial operations.	06/24/1988	03/31/1989	–	–	–

== See also ==
- List of Superfund sites in the United States
- List of environmental issues
- List of waste types
- TOXMAP
