= Union Methodist Episcopal Church =

Union Methodist Episcopal Church and variations may refer to:

- Union Bethel African Methodist Episcopal Church (Great Falls, Montana), listed on the NRHP in Montana
- Union Methodist Episcopal Church (Philadelphia, Pennsylvania), listed on the NRHP in Pennsylvania
- Union Avenue Methodist Episcopal Church, South, Memphis, TN, listed on the NRHP in Tennessee
