= Midtown, Memphis =

Neighborhood of Memphis, Tennessee

Coordinates: 35.145°N 89.99°W

Midtown
- Neighborhood of Memphis
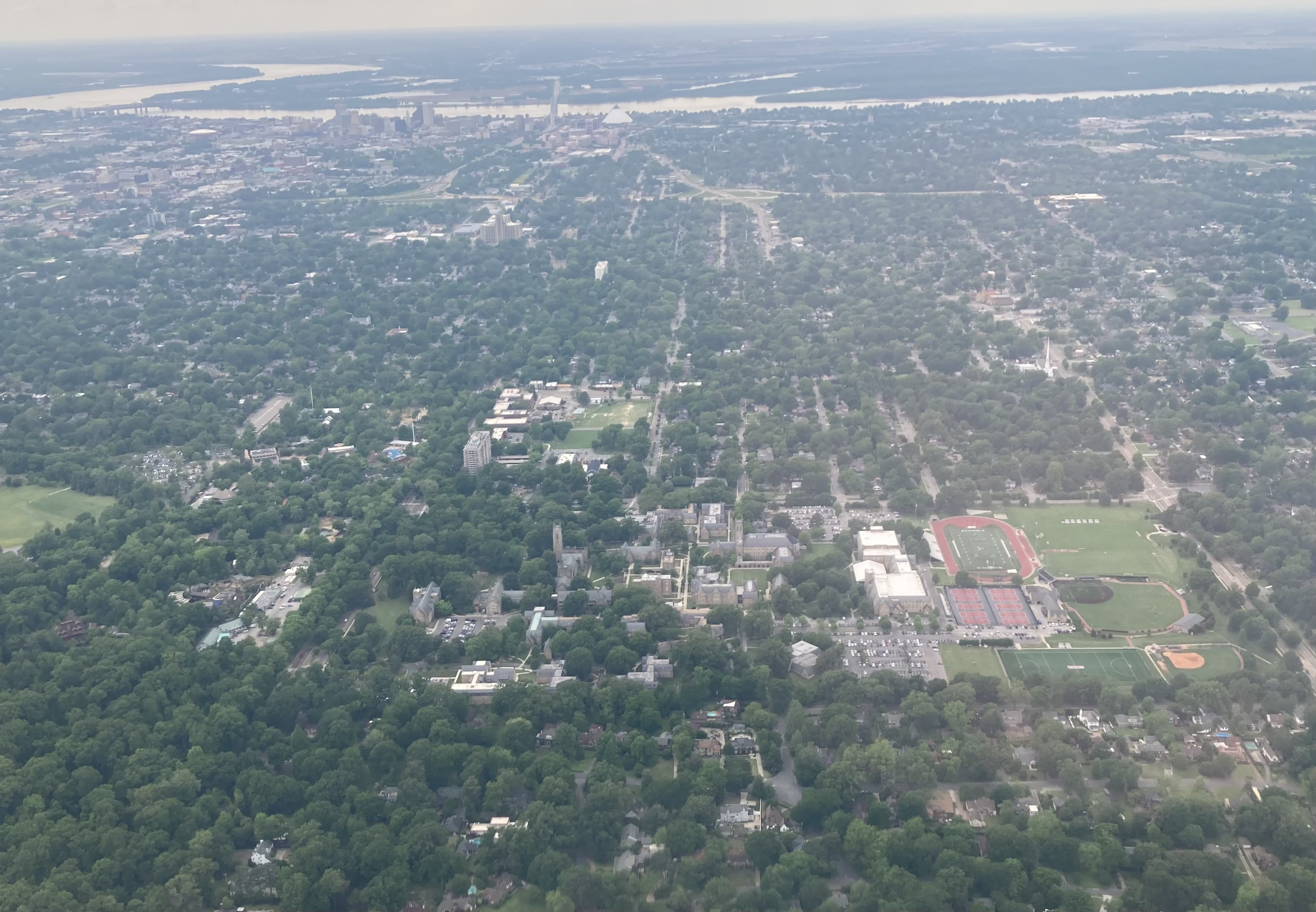
- View of Rhodes College, facing west towards downtown
- Interactive map of Midtown
- Country: United States
- State: Tennessee
- County: Shelby County
- City: Memphis
- ZIP Code: 38104, 38107, 38112

Midtown is a collection of neighborhoods in Memphis, Tennessee, to the east of Downtown.

Midtown is home to many cultural attractions, institutions of higher education, and noteworthy pieces of architecture. The district is an anchor in Memphis' arts scene, including the Playhouse on the Square, the Brooks Museum of Art, the Memphis College of Art, and the Levitt Shell. The annual Cooper-Young Arts Festival draws over 120,000 visitors to the district. Midtown also plays host to multiple universities and colleges, including Memphis College of Art, Rhodes College, and Christian Brothers University.

Midtown is characterized by vintage residential housing, a blend of independent and chain retailers, and high-rise buildings. Multiple historic districts are located in Midtown, and commercial corridors such as Overton Square and Cooper Street developed before World War II in an urban style. Mixed use areas with housing, religious, commercial and office spaces are common in Midtown.

== Population and geography ==
Midtown has an evenly distributed black and white population, as well as a notable Asian population. Cleveland Street in Crosstown is the heart of the Vietnamese population in Memphis, with multiple Vietnamese-owned businesses and a Buddhist temple.

The exact boundaries of Midtown are often disputed. Generally, it is the area between the Medical District to the west and East Memphis to the east. The eastern boundary is variously defined as East Parkway, the CN railroad east of East Parkway. The northern boundary is Vollintine Avenue. VECA is generally considered the northernmost neighborhood in Midtown. Cooper-Young and Rozelle are generally regarded as the southernmost neighborhoods in Midtown. Interstate 240 provides the western border for the neighborhood, separating Midtown from Downtown and the Medical District.

=== List of neighborhoods ===
- Annesdale Park (Historic District)
- Central Gardens (Historic District)
- Chickasaw Gardens
- Cooper-Young (Historic District)
- Crosstown (Historic District)
- Evergreen (Historic District)
- Hein Park (Historic District)
- Idlewild (Historic District)
- Lea's Woods (Historic District)
- Lenox
- Overton Square
- Rozelle
- Speedway Terrace (Historic District)
- Tucker-Jefferson
- Vollintine-Evergreen (Historic District)
- Vollintine Hills (Historic District)

== Education ==
=== Primary and secondary education ===
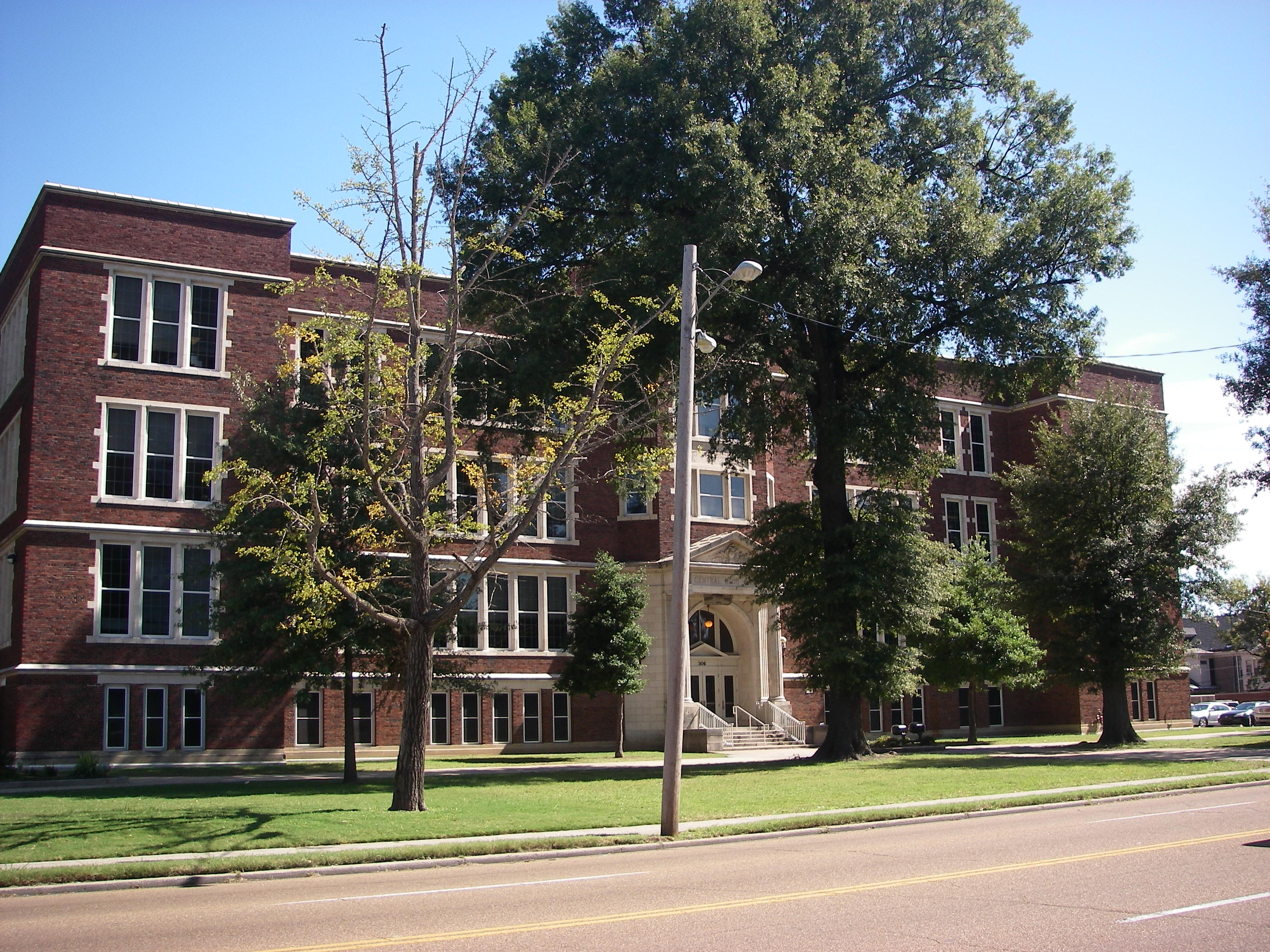
Central High School

Midtown public schools include Snowden School (elementary and middle), Idlewild Elementary, Rozelle Elementary, Peabody Elementary, Bellevue Middle, Fairview Middle, and Central High School, some of which offer optional programs. Several private and parochial schools are also found throughout Midtown, including Grace-St. Luke's Episcopal School, Immaculate Conception Cathedral School and Memphis Catholic High School. The 1st Class Montessori School has operated for over twenty years on Peabody Avenue in Midtown.

=== Higher education ===
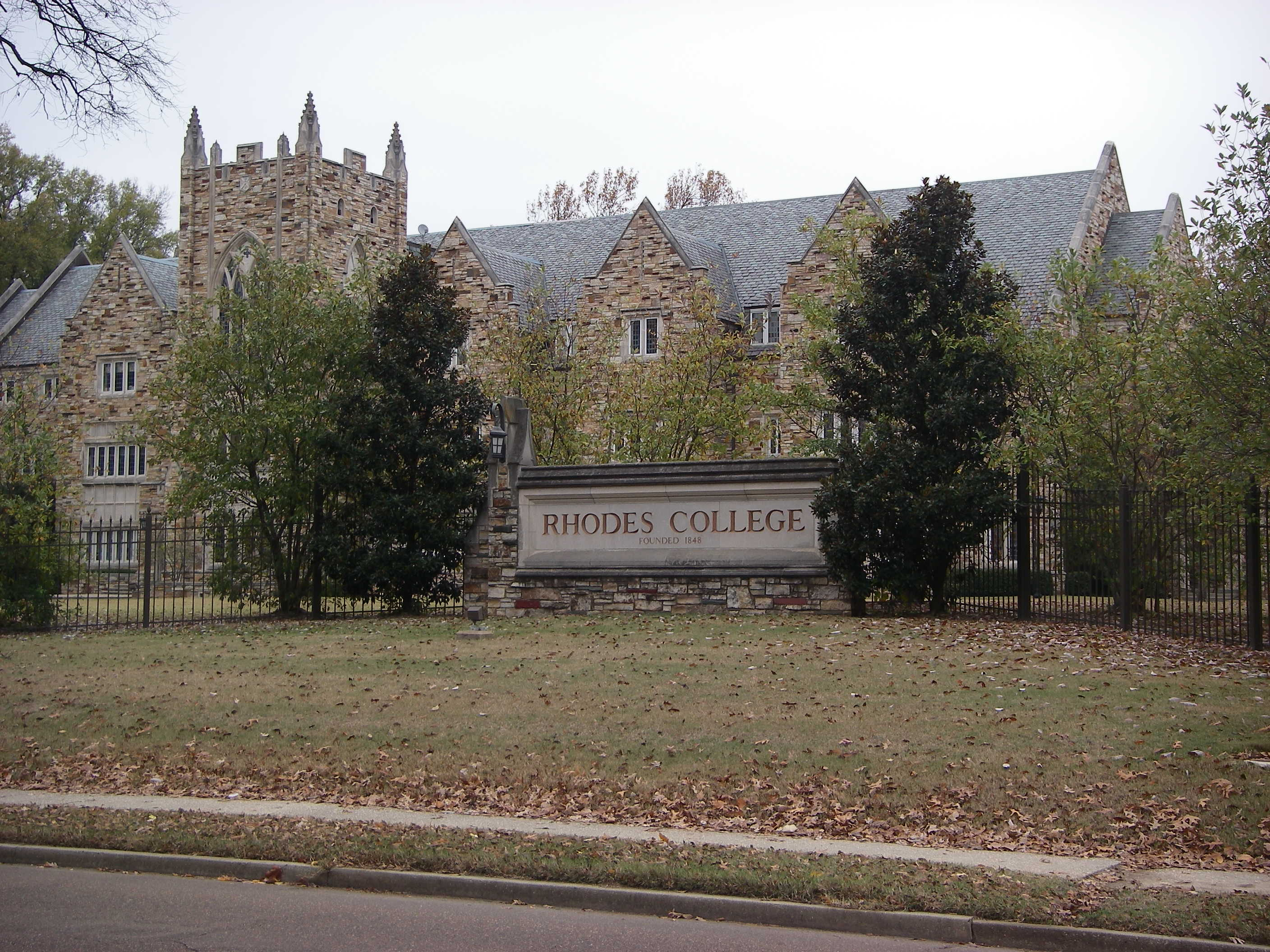
Buckman Hall at Rhodes College

Midtown is home to two private undergraduate universities. Rhodes College is a classical liberal arts college housing roughly two thousand students in the Vollintine-Evergreen neighborhood. Christian Brothers University is located adjacent to the Lenox neighborhood on East Parkway.

Several specialized colleges and schools are also located in Midtown. The Memphis Theological Seminary is located on East Parkway, in the East End neighborhood. Overton Park is home to the Memphis College of Art, which moved to its current location from Victorian Village in the 1960s. The Southern College of Optometry and Moore Tech, a small vocational college, are located in the Crosstown area.

Several other institutions of learning are located nearby. The historically black LeMoyne-Owen College operates in Soulsville, a neighborhood to the south of Midtown. The Memphis Medical District to the west includes University of Tennessee Health Science Center's Medical, Pharmacy, Nursing and Dentistry schools; Methodist Hospital Schools of Radiologic Sciences and Nursing; and the Baptist Health Sciences University.

== Culture, parks, and recreation ==
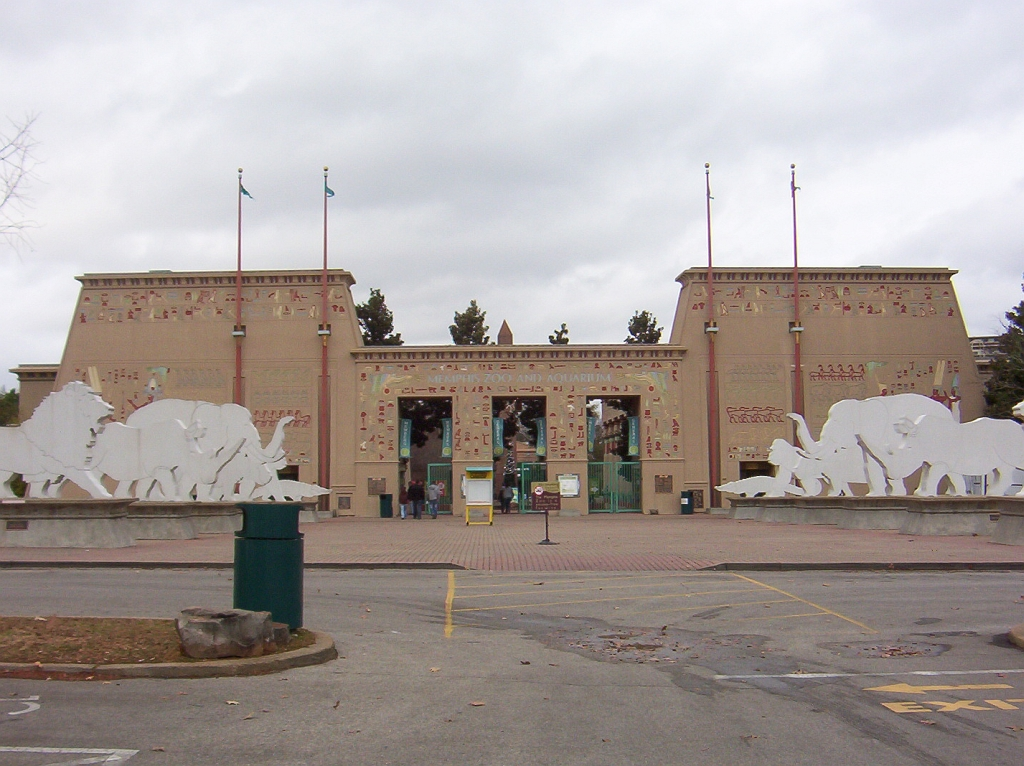
Memphis Zoo entrance gate

Midtown contains Overton Park which includes the Memphis Brooks Museum of Art, the Memphis Zoo, and the Memphis College of Art. It is also known for its bars and restaurants, many of them featuring live music at night. Located in the Cooper-Young neighborhood are coffeehouses, restaurants, and bars. Midtown Memphis is also home to a Malco movie theatre and the city's only professional theatre troupe, Playhouse on the Square, which currently runs three separate theatres. Grace-St. Luke's Tiffany windows are thought to be the largest collection of Tiffany windows in a parish church in the South. Central Gardens is a historic neighborhood in Midtown.

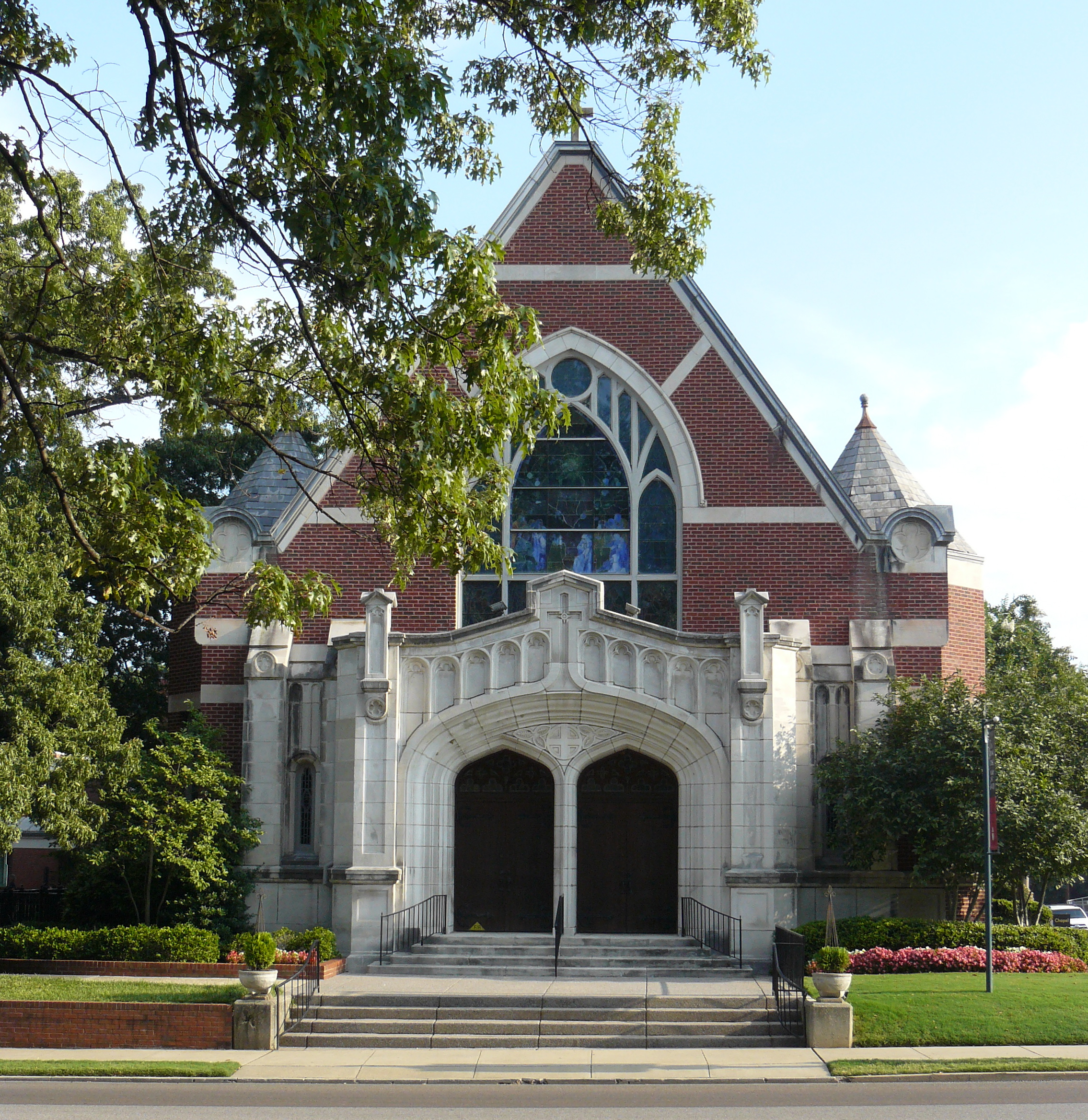
Grace-St. Luke's Episcopal Church

Tennessee Williams wrote his first publicly performed play, Cairo, Shanghai, Bombay! while staying in the Midtown home of his grandparents: 1917 Snowden Ave. It was first performed in 1935 at 1780 Glenview, also in Midtown.

The Cooper-Young Festival is also held annually at the intersection of Cooper and Young, in Midtown. Another area, Overton Square, holds a St. Patrick's Day celebration.

Midtown was also home to the Mid-South Fair for 152 years. However, the year 2008 was the last year that the Mid-South Fair was held in Memphis. Starting in 2009, the Mid-South Fair was held on newly acquired land at Tunica, Mississippi.

== Transportation ==
Due to the historic eastward expansion of the city, automobile traffic in Midtown is primarily served by east–west arteries. Major traffic corridors in the district include:

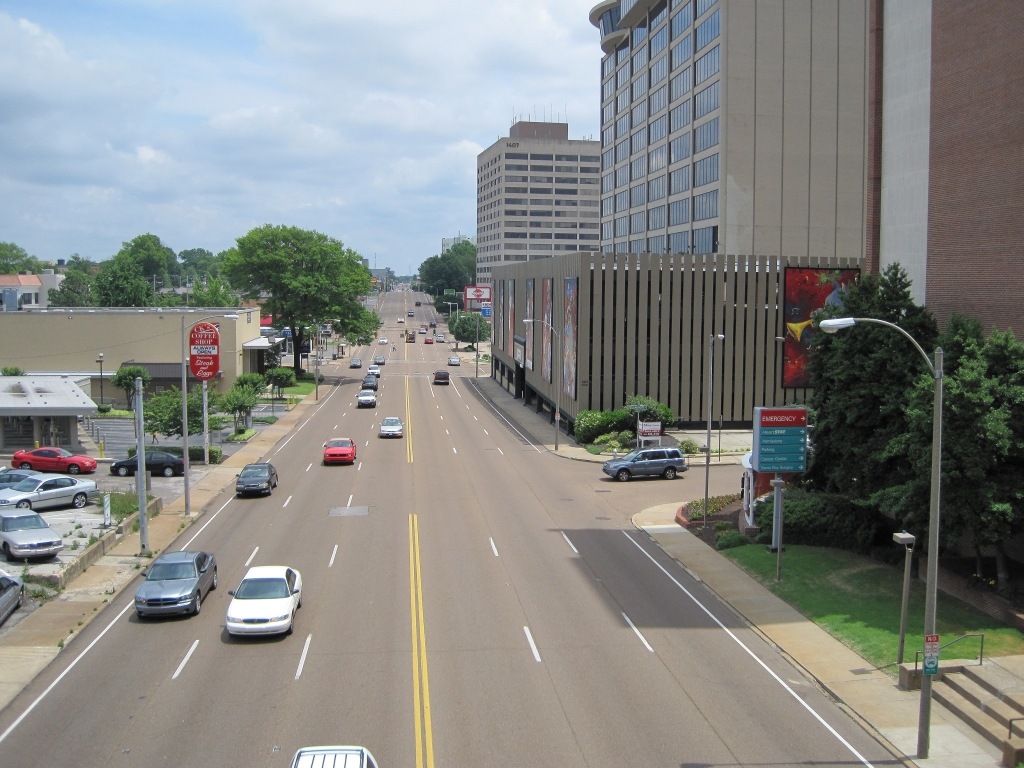
Union Avenue near Methodist University Hospital in 2010

1. Union Avenue, which since World War II has served as the area's main commercial artery;
2. Poplar Avenue, which is largely fronted by 1920s apartment buildings and the commercial district for the Evergreen neighborhood;
3. Madison Avenue, which served as pre-World War II Memphis' main east–west corridor, and now feeds the Overton Square district;
4. McLean Boulevard, which is a primary north–south connector of residential neighborhoods;
5. Cooper Street, which connects Overton Park to the Overton Square, Idlewild, Lenox and Cooper-Young neighborhoods;
6. Cleveland Street, which runs through the Crosstown neighborhood.

Midtown Memphis is connected to the Medical District and downtown via the MATA Madison Avenue trolley line, with a park and ride station at Cleveland Street. Historically, Madison Avenue was the location of the "Dummy Line", the main east–west streetcar line that went from downtown to the Mid-South Fairgrounds (east along Madison, south down Cooper, and east along Young), and many commercial and residential structures along the avenue date to the beginning of the twentieth century. Most of this stretch of Madison contains its original granite curbs, and in a few locations the original brick pavers can be seen in the gutters.

Bicycle infrastructure is growing in Midtown, with bike lanes installed on McLean Boulevard, Madison Avenue, Southern Avenue, and Cooper Street in the late 2010s. Protected bike lanes have been installed on portions of Overton Park Avenue. Additionally, the Hampline is a two-way bicycle track that connects Overton Park to Shelby Farms in suburban Memphis via the Shelby Farms Greenline.

== Gallery of landmarks ==
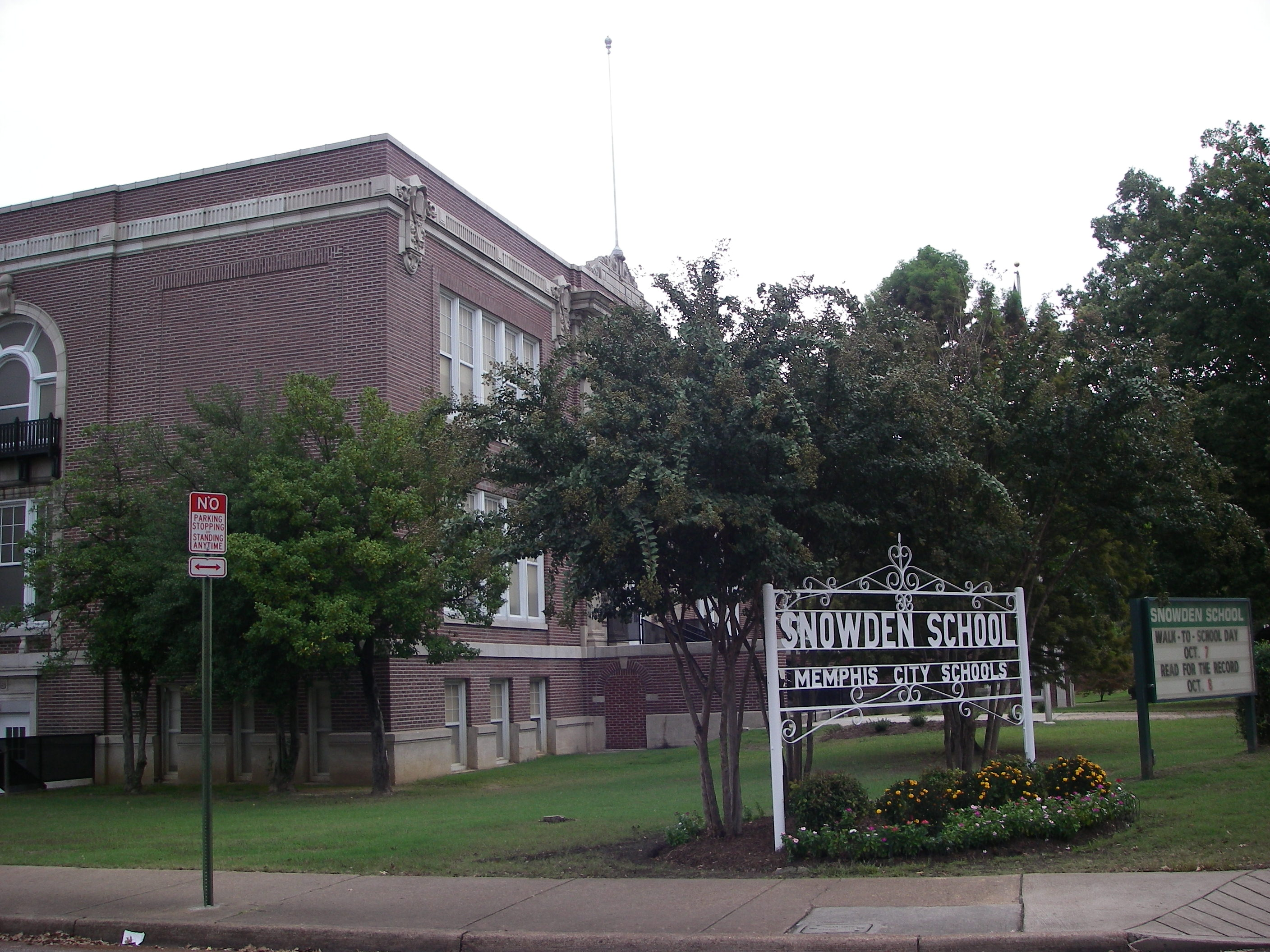
Snowden School

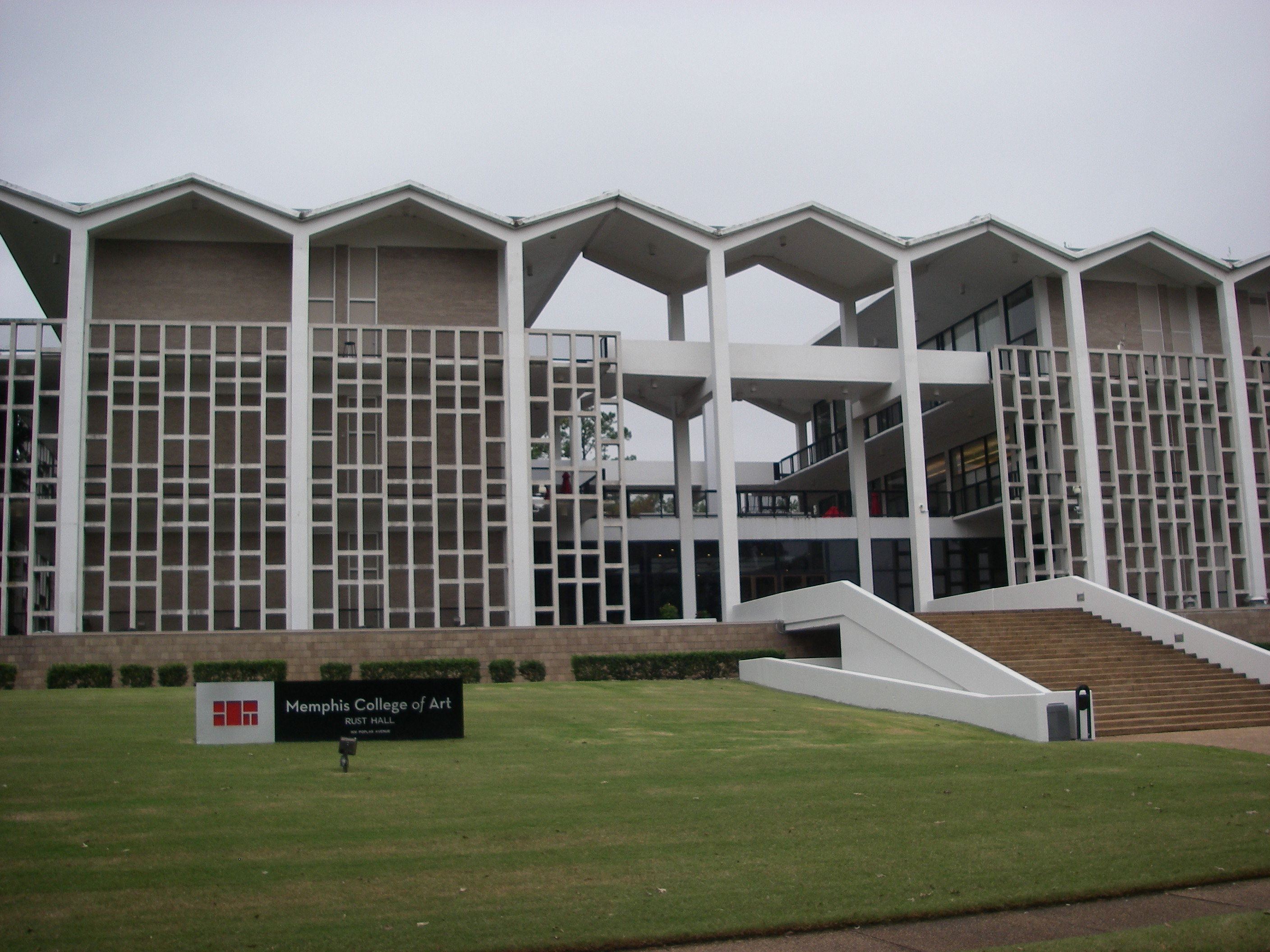
Memphis College of Art

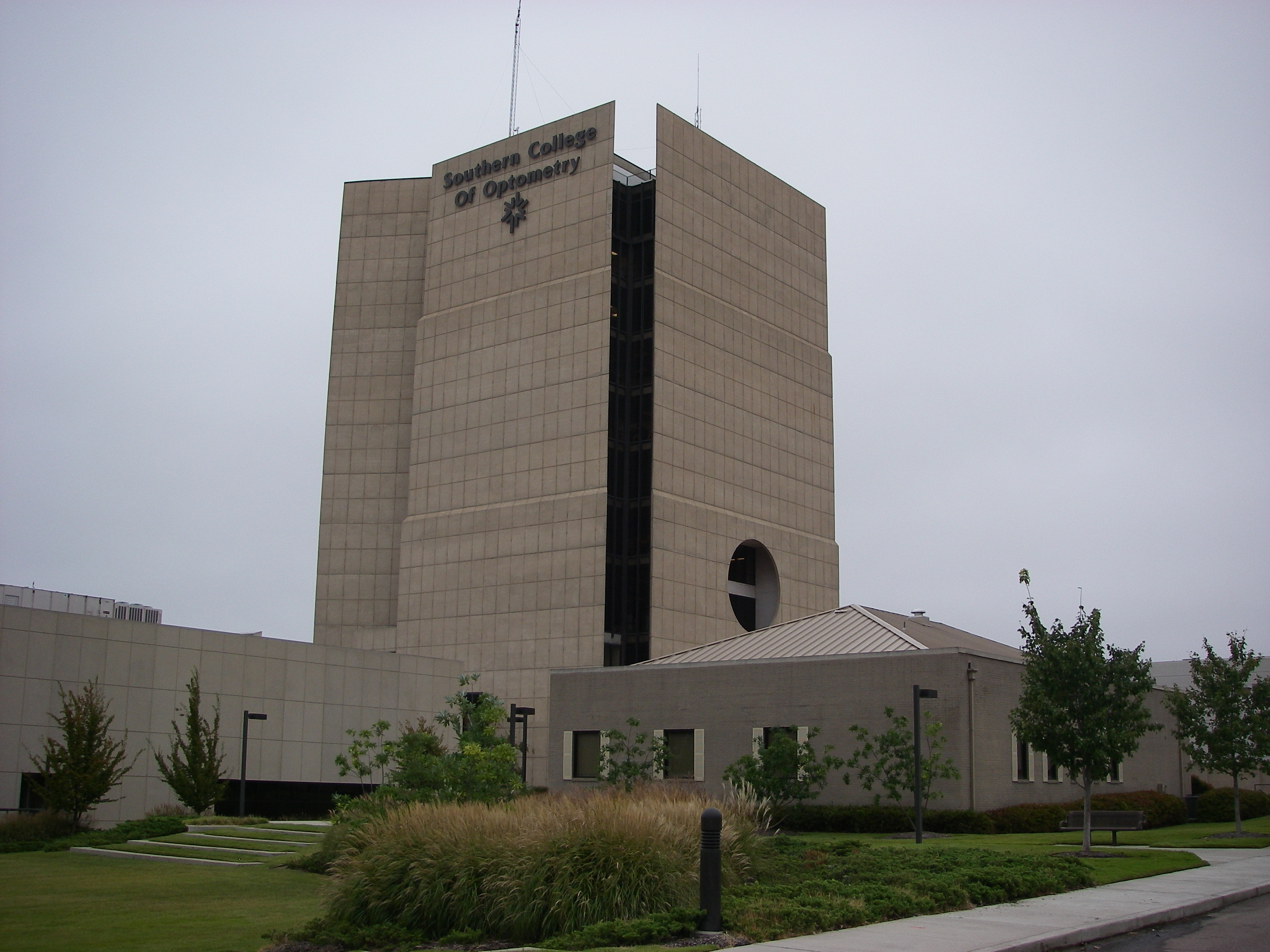
Southern College of Optometry

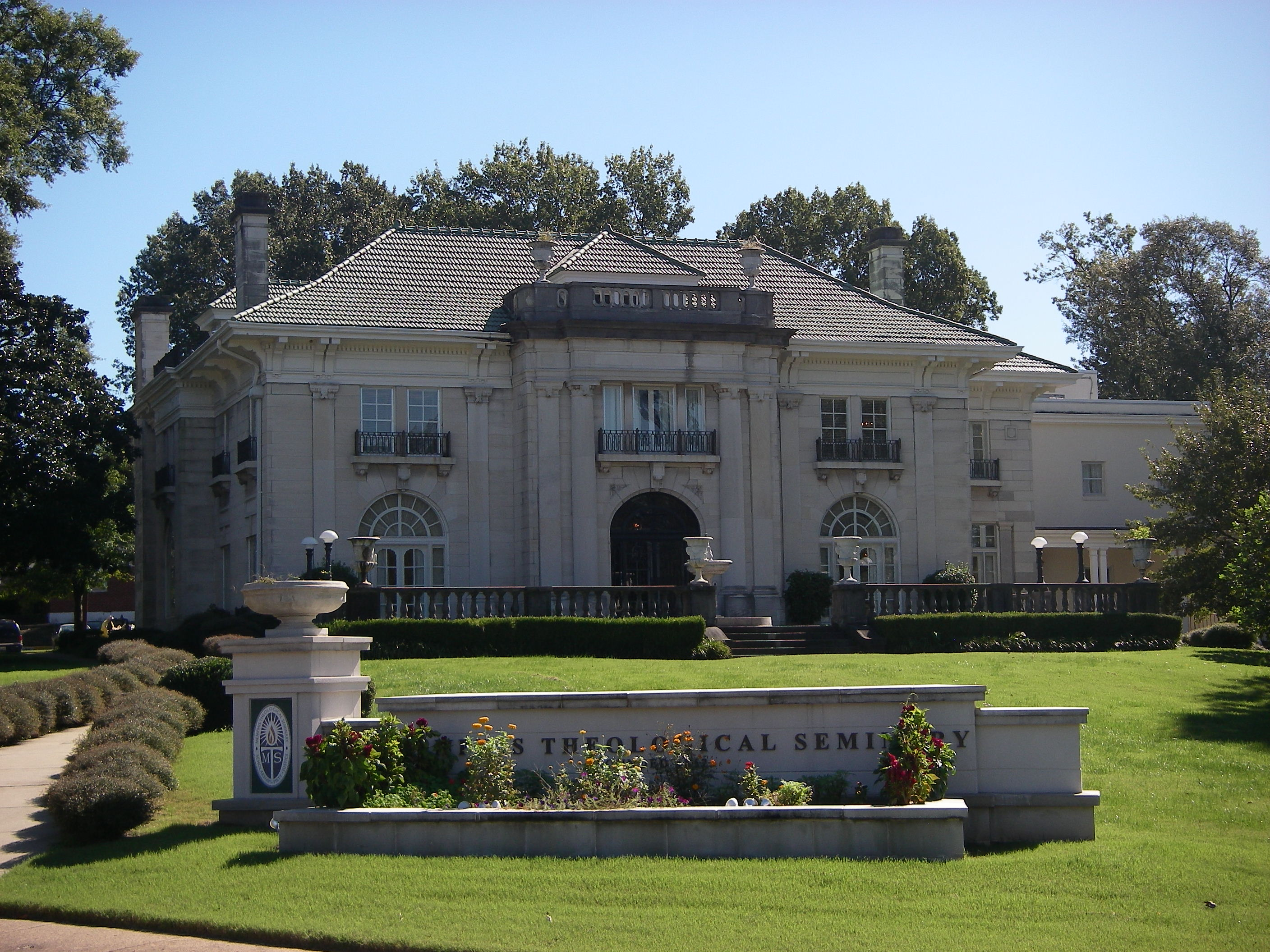
Memphis Theological Seminary of the Cumberland Presbyterian Church

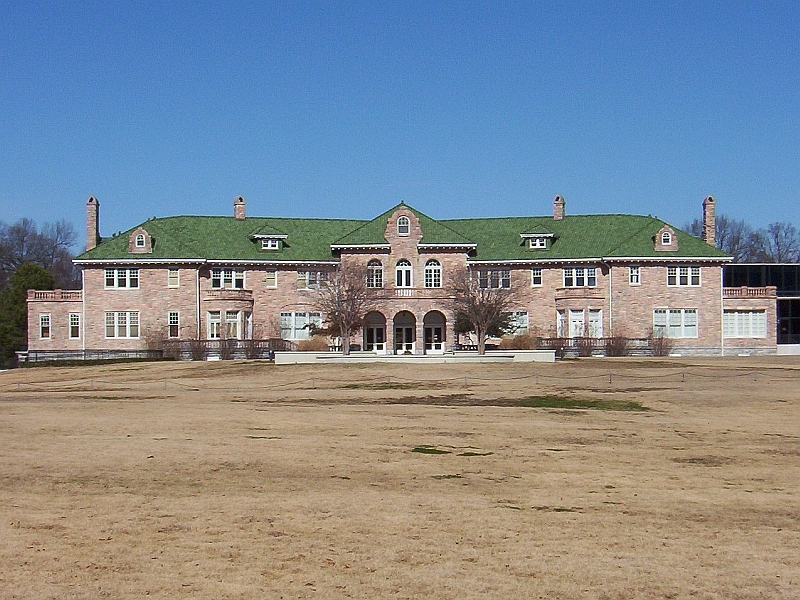
Pink Palace Museum and Planetarium (2008)

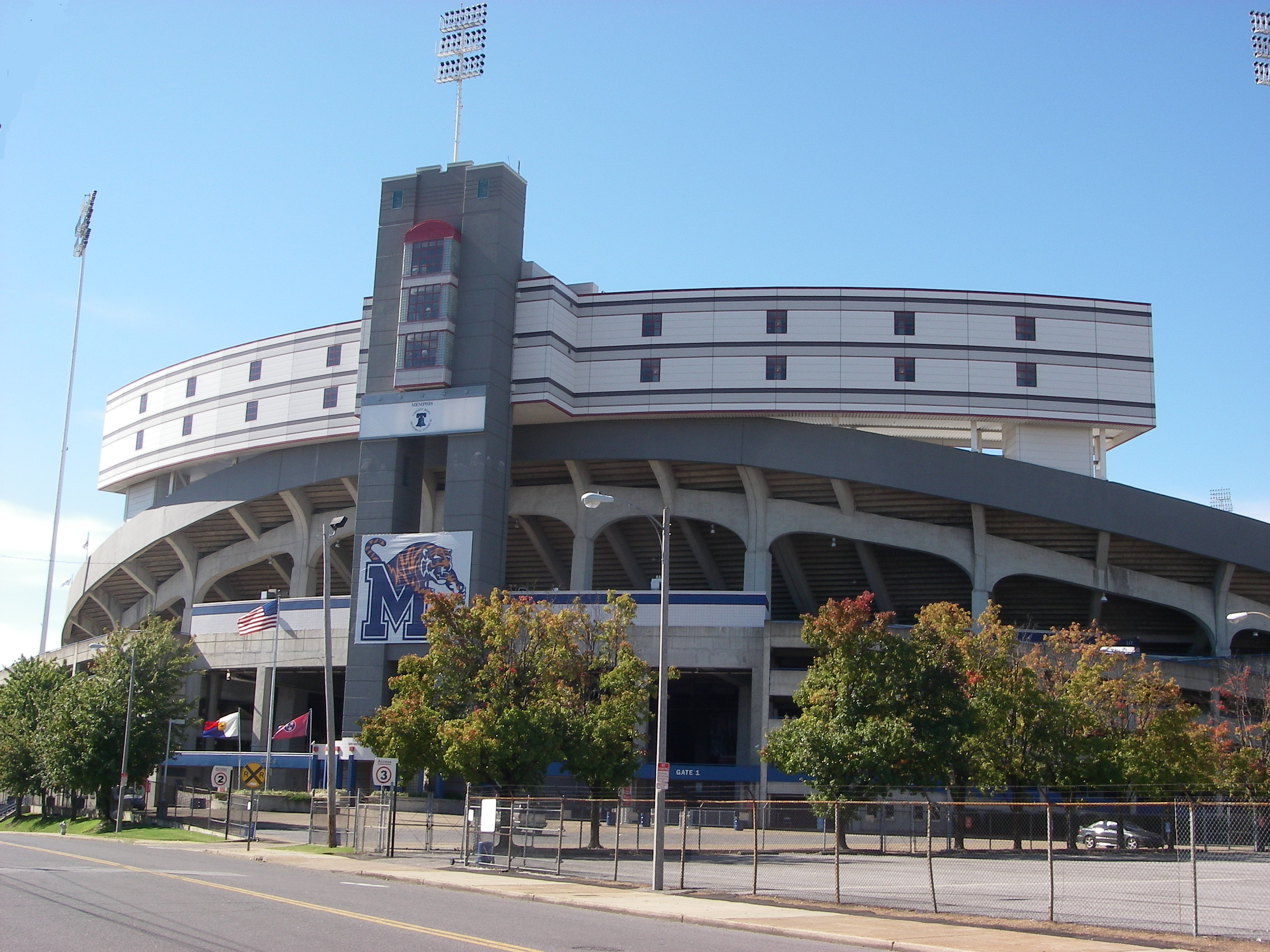
Liberty Bowl Memorial Stadium Entrance

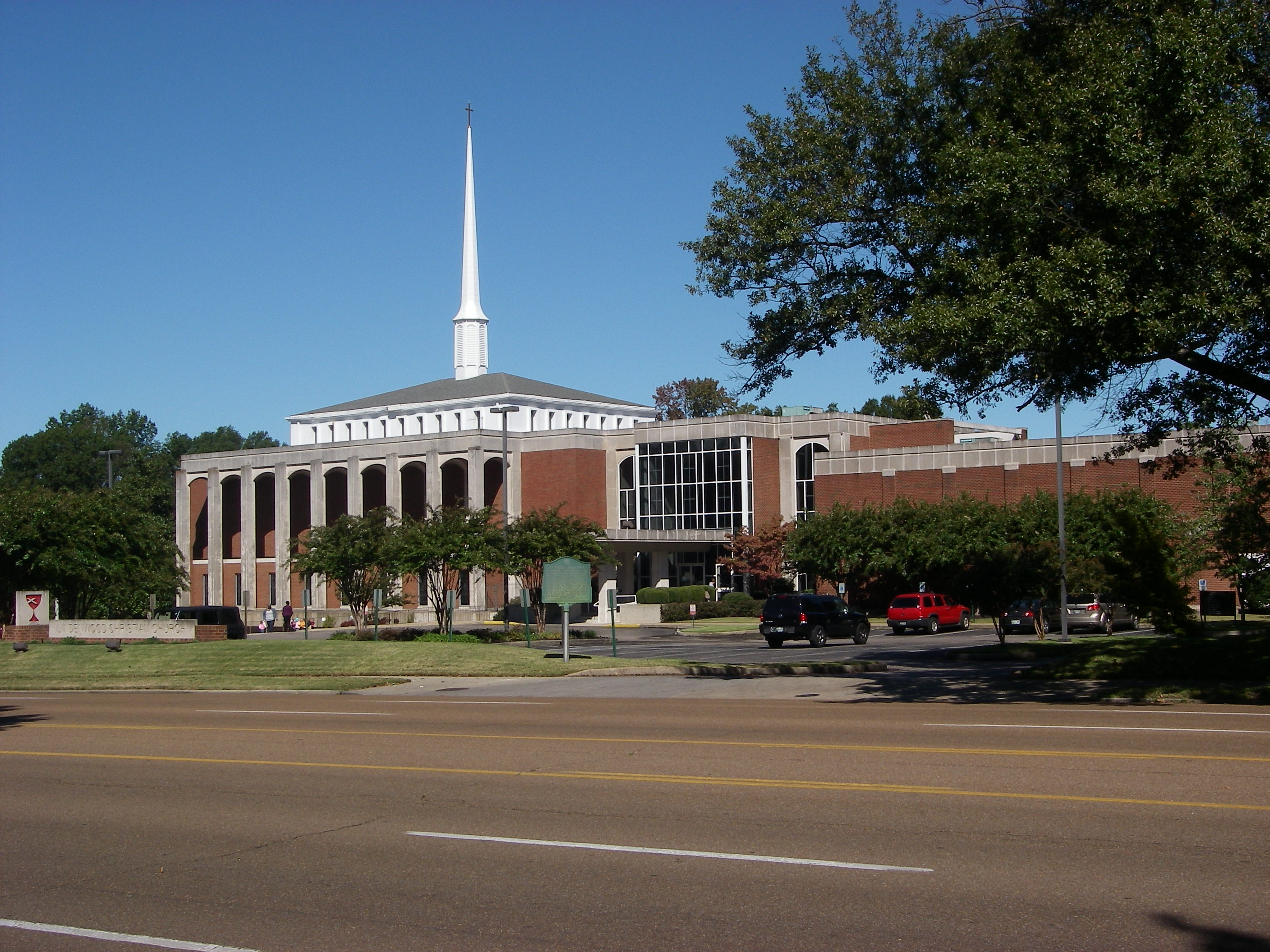
Lindenwood Church

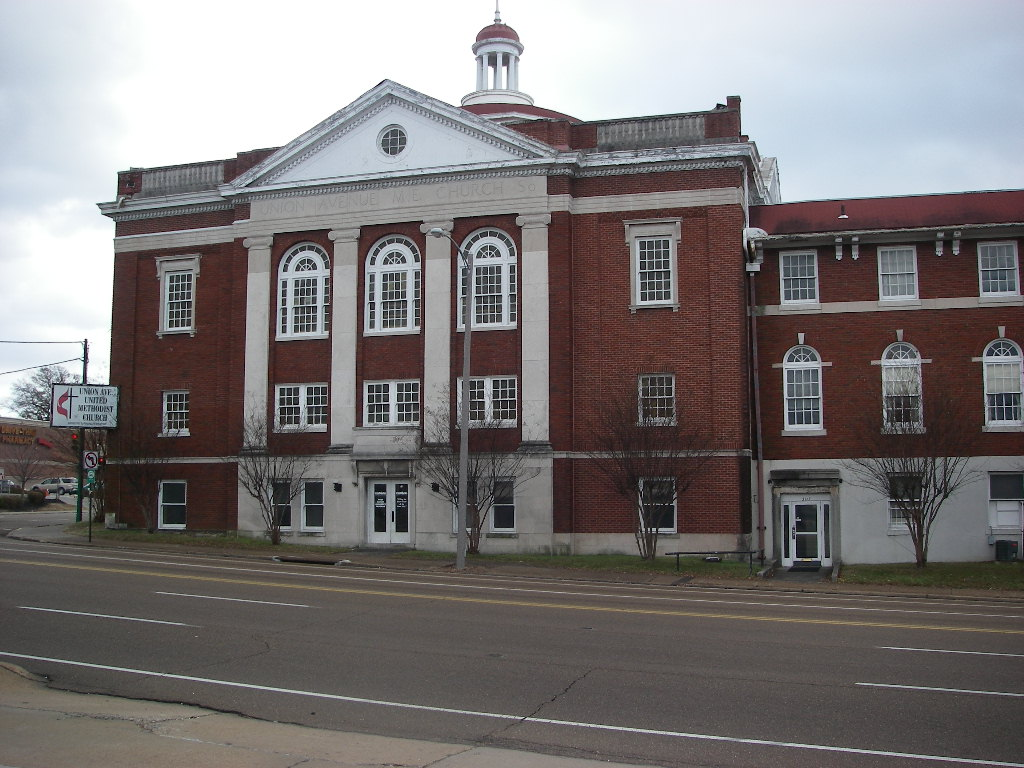
Union Avenue Methodist Church (demolished in 2011)

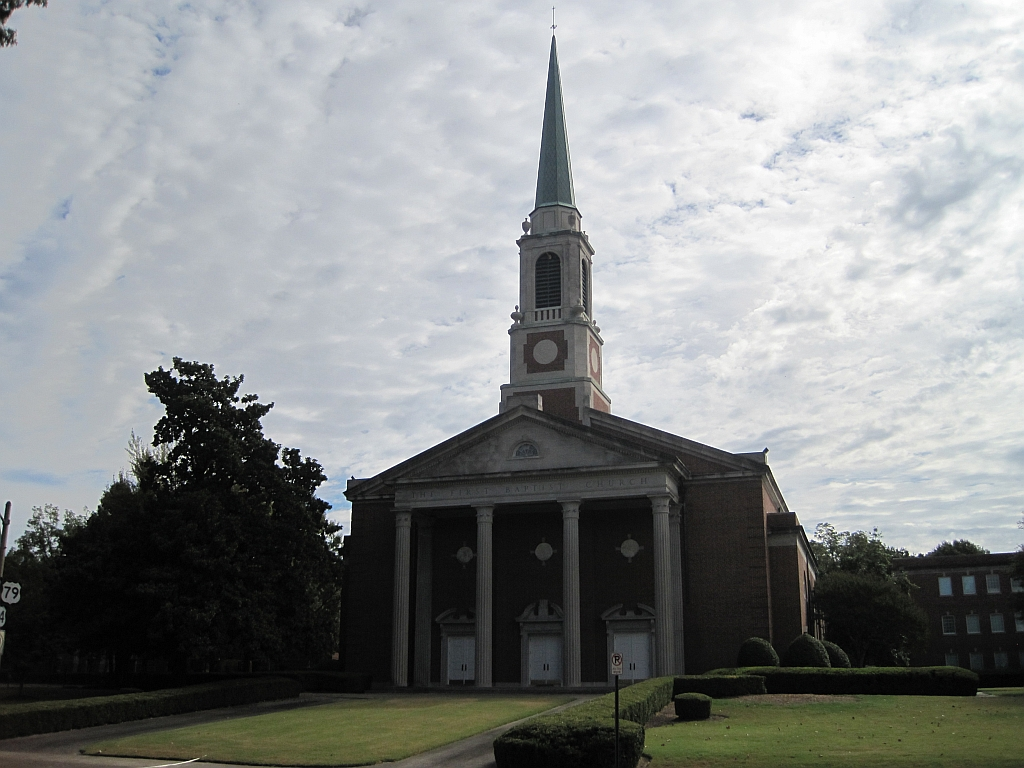
The First Baptist Church of Memphis
