= Grace-St. Luke's Episcopal Church =

Historic church in Tennessee, United States

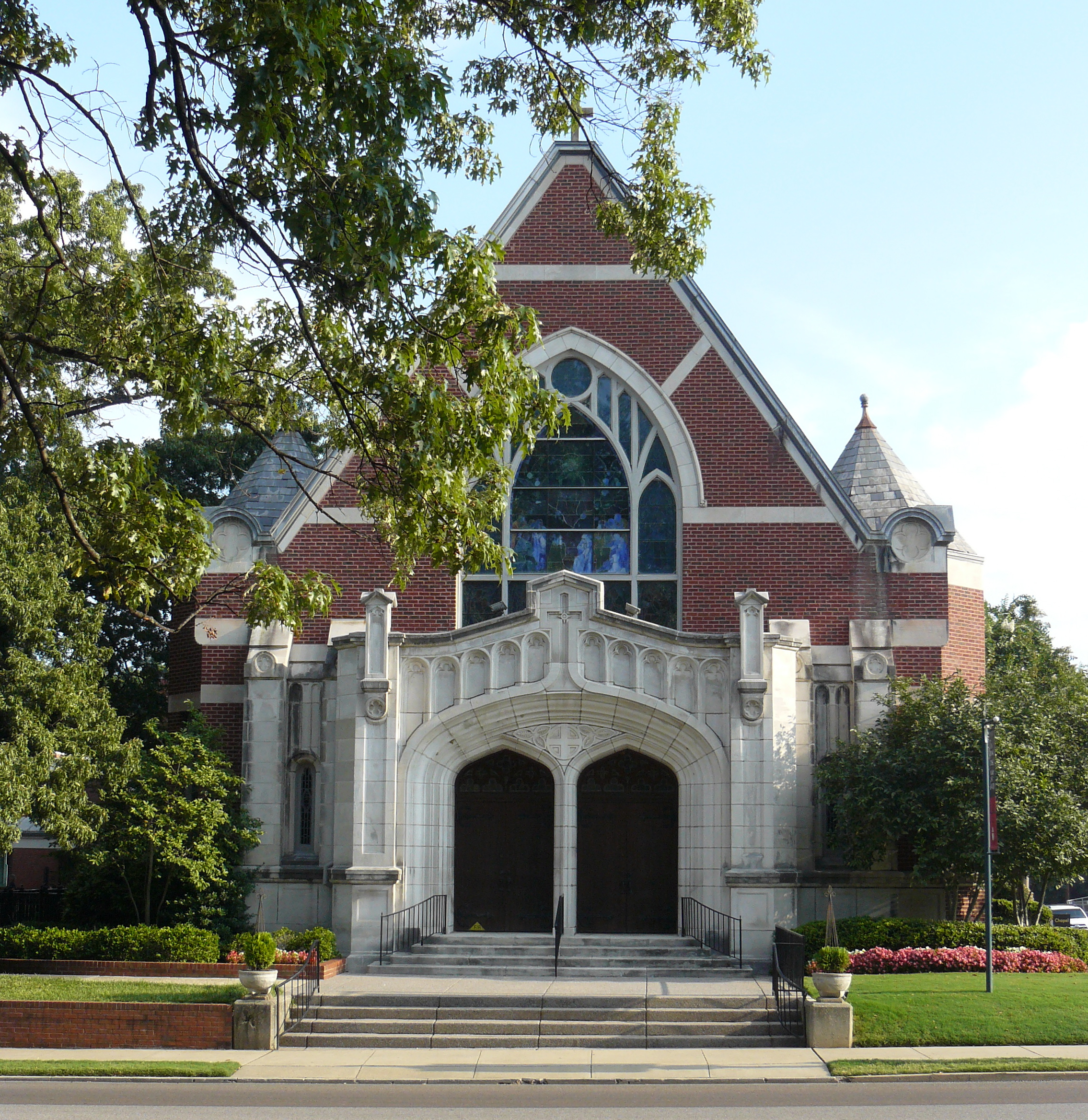
- Grace-St. Luke's Episcopal Church
- 35°07′56.17″N 90°00′15.85″W
- Country: United States
- Denomination: Episcopal
- Website: www.gracestlukes.org

History
- Status: Parish church

Architecture
- Years built: 1912

Administration
- Province: IV (Southeast)
- Diocese: West Tennessee

Clergy
- Rector: Ollie Rencher

Grace-St. Luke's Episcopal Church is an historic church in Midtown Memphis, Tennessee. The church's history dates back to the mid-19th century and the current structure—located in Memphis' Central Gardens Historic Preservation District at 1720 Peabody Avenue—was constructed in 1912.

Today the parish is active and is known both for its progressive hunger ministries and its formal worship and music.

The church is part of the Episcopal Diocese of West Tennessee.

== History ==
The history of Grace-St. Lukes dates back to the mid-19th century with the establishment of Grace Church in a rented room in what was then on the eastern outskirts of the city, now Midtown Memphis. After the Civil War, returning Confederate Officers founded St. Lazarus Church on Madison Avenue, in Downtown Memphis in protest to the Unionist views of the rector of Calvary Church. St. Lazarus was the site of the marriage of Jefferson Davis' daughter in 1876, but St. Lazarus' congregation was decimated by the yellow fever epidemic in 1878 and merged with Grace Church. St. Luke's Church was established in present-day Midtown in 1894 in a building designed by English architect John Gainsford.

By the late 1930s, Grace Church had a strong congregation, but found itself without a building. St. Luke's Church, on the other hand, had erected a new church in the heart of residential Memphis in 1912 (its present home), but found itself in a period of declining membership. The two merged, and celebrated its first service as the Parish of Grace-St. Luke's on Thanksgiving Day, 1940. Grace-St Luke's Episcopal School, a K-8 primary school, was founded in 1947.

The parish continued to grow and, by 1974, had doubled in size and was the largest Episcopal parish in the state of Tennessee. Though no longer the largest in the state, the parish continues to have active membership and strong outreach and community programs.

== Ordination of women ==
Grace-St. Luke's emphasis on inclusivity dates at least back to 1981, when the parish ordained the first female Episcopalian woman as priest in the state of Tennessee.

The Rev. Ann Carriere was ordained deacon at Grace-St. Luke's on July 12, 1981, by Bishop Fred Gates in a nave packed with parishioners, ecumenical Memphis clergy, and community members who had followed the news in the media. Carriere served in the supportive community at Grace-St. Luke's -- and out of the public eye where her role caused considerable controversy—and was ordained priest there in 1982. She served the parish eight more years.

== Tiffany windows ==
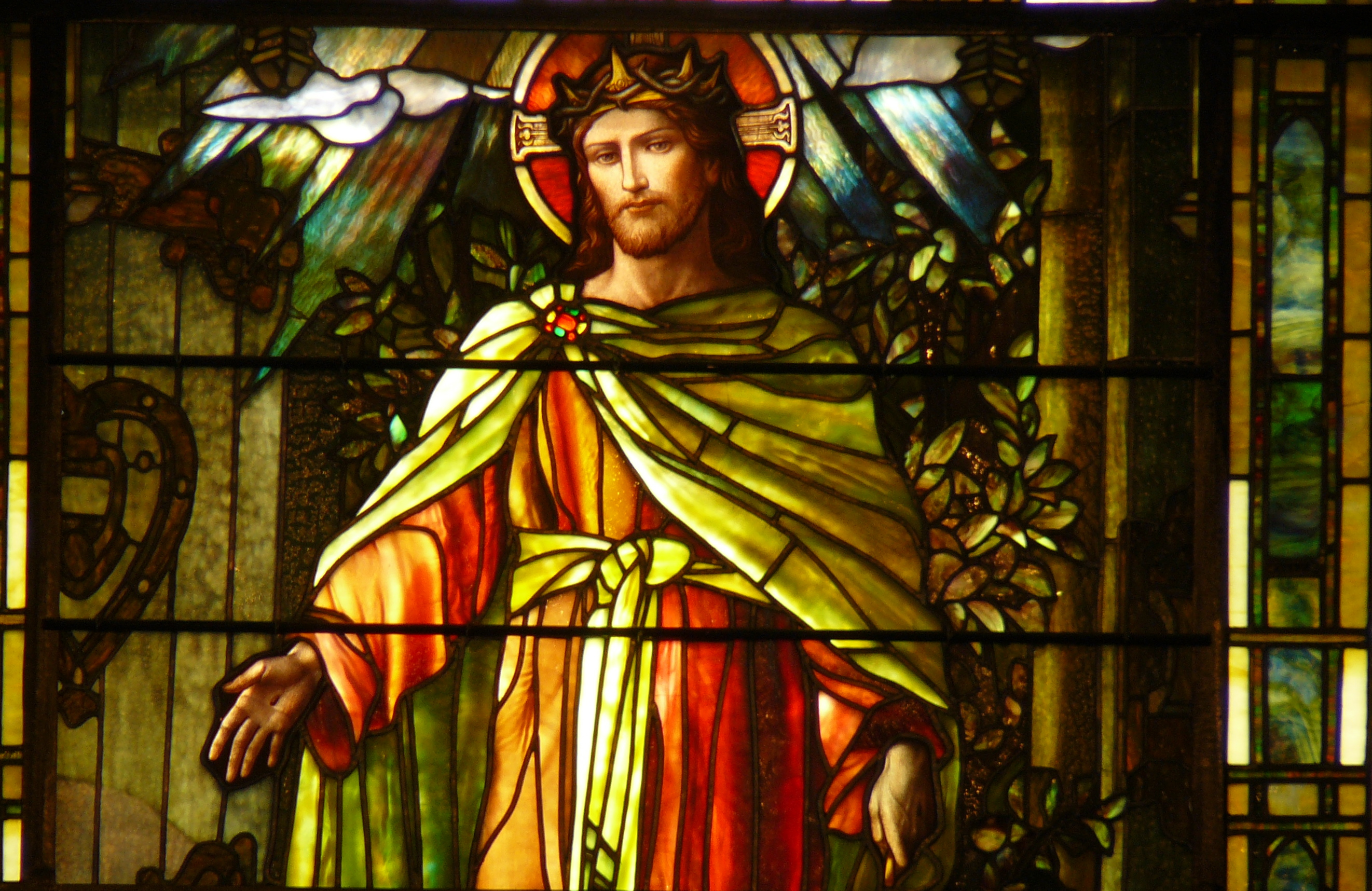
Detail from "Christ the Light of the World", a turn-of-the-century window at Grace St. Luke's Episcopal Church in Memphis

Grace-St. Luke's cares for a magnificent Tiffany stained window that dates back to 1900, and six other defining windows from the turn of that century. That year, one of the benefactors of Grace Church, Mrs. W. A. Gage, met a representative of the Tiffany Glass Company at the Paris Exposition. She personally underwrote a signature window depicting Christ's ascension to be hung above the altar. Louis Comfort Tiffany personally supervised its installation. The vestry commissioned six more windows in 1907 long thought to be the work of Tiffany as well, but recent evidence suggests those six were Gorham windows, a significant Tiffany competitor in design and technique. Grace brought all seven to St. Luke's when the churches merged in 1940, spectacular reminders of the two parishes becoming one. Window scholars recognize the Ascension window, now hanging over the main doors of the church, as a prime example of the Tiffany palette.
