= Cooper-Young, Memphis =

Neighborhood in Memphis, Tennessee, US

Coordinates: 35.1195°N 89.9910°W

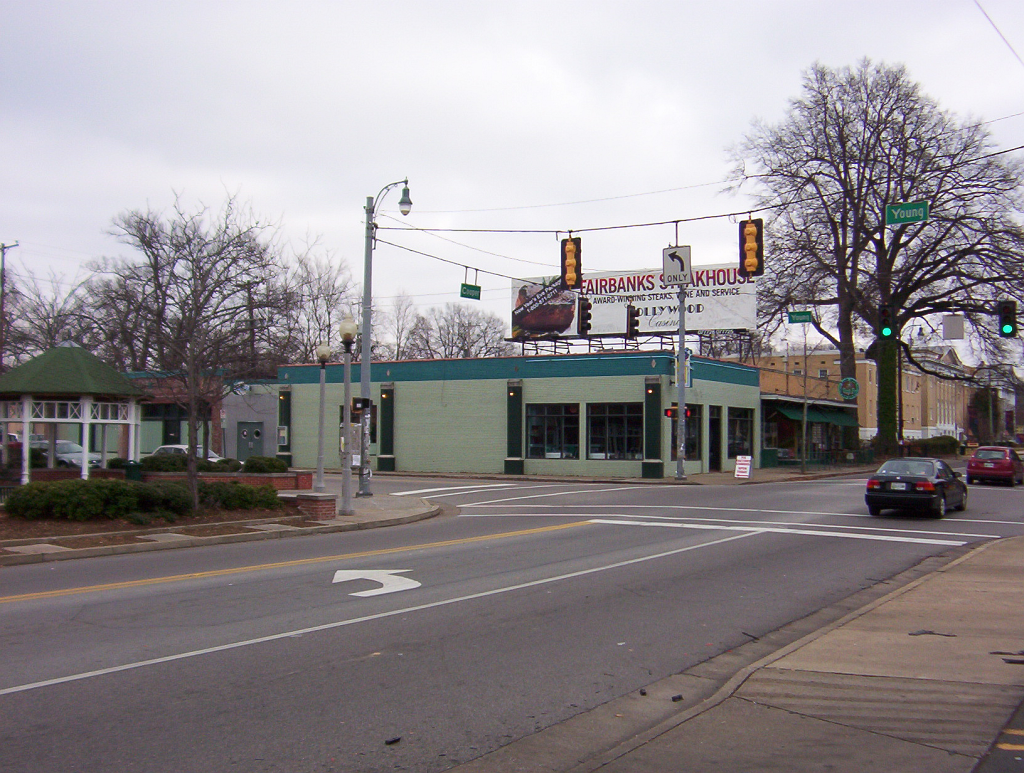
Intersection of Cooper Street and Young Avenue in the Cooper-Young District in Memphis (2008)

Cooper-Young is a neighborhood and historic district in the Midtown section of Memphis, Tennessee, named for the intersection of Cooper Street and Young Avenue. The entrance to the neighborhood is marked by the Cooper-Young Trestle, a 150-foot (46 m) long steel sculpture which depicts homes and businesses found in the neighborhood. Created by metal artist Jill Turman, the sculpture was dedicated in 2000, and has become a source of community pride and identity. In 2012, Cooper-Young was listed on the American Planning Association's 10 Great Neighborhoods in the U.S. list.

== Economy ==
The neighborhood is known for its eclectic mix of shops, bars and restaurants. Java Cabana, Cooper-Young's coffeehouse, was once host to the Elvis Impersonator shrine, as well as the Viva Wedding Chapel, where hundreds of people were once married in the backroom by Elvis impersonators. Other restaurants such as Cooper's, Fawn Memphis, Soul Fish Cafe, Nagoya House, Celtic Crossing, Aldo's Pizza Pies, Hammer and Ale, La Roche Lebanese, Kitchen Laurel, Wild Beets, No Comment Wine Bar, Hammer and Ale, Cooper House Project, Imagine Vegan Cafe, Bar DKDC, Central BBQ, The Beauty Shop, and Young Ave Deli represent diverse cuisines (sometimes several within one establishment) and reflect the creative spirit of the neighborhood.

Also in Cooper Young, one will find The House of Mews (a shelter for homeless cats), Goner Records, a local record label, Jay Etkin Gallery and Burke's Book Store. Cooper Young is home to Memphis Made Brewing. Cooper Young is also where Memphis' only hostel, Pilgrim House Hostel, is located.

== Cooper-Young Festival ==
Each fall, the neighborhood hosts the Cooper-Young Festival, starting with an Art Invitational on Thursday, a 4-mile run on Friday, arts and crafts vendors, and live music performances on Saturday. The Cooper Young Festival is always the second Saturday after Labor Day each year from 9 a.m. to 7 p.m. The neighborhood is considered one of the more artistic and "hip" areas of the city, and shows evidence of successful urban revitalization in Memphis' core. The Cooper Young Festival, hosted by the Cooper Young Business Association (CYBA), is a popular outdoor celebration in Memphis, Tennessee. It is one of Memphis' most highly attended festivals in Tennessee bringing in over 130,000 attendees and is continuing to grow. The festival is the largest single day event in the city where people pack into the neighborhood. It is free admission. 400 artisans from around the country go to sell their music, arts, and crafts along Cooper Street and Young Avenue. The festival came about in 1977 when a group of 500 residents from the area organized and decided to have it. November 5, 1977 was the date of the first festival. It was a community flea market with a stage and playground activities in the parking lot of Galloway United Methodist Church. It turned into a three-day festival called Cooper Young Business Association Street Fair. Starting with 7,000 visitors, the festival grew to entertaining 100,000 visitors. Every year the festival is kicked off with a neighborhood art invitational. An artist from the Cooper Young neighborhood designs a poster to represent the unique style of the Cooper Young area. Bands are brought in to perform on three stages over the weekend.

== Community ==
The Cooper-Young Community Association, founded in 1976, serves as the main advocate for the residents of the area. The CYCA holds several annual events -- Festival 4-Miler race - a 4-mile race through the neighborhood the night before the Cooper-Young Festival, Cooper-Young Beerfest, and Cooper-Young Porchfest, a free music festival spanning the neighborhood with residents' porches turning into musical stages for the day. The CYCA also hold smaller monthly events meant to inform and connect residents.

The Cooper-Young Business Association serves as the primary advocate for the businesses and services of the neighborhood, and produces the Cooper-Young Festival along with other events to help draw attention to those businesses.
