= Lenox, Memphis =

Neighborhood of Memphis, Tennessee

Coordinates: 35.1296°N 89.9875°W

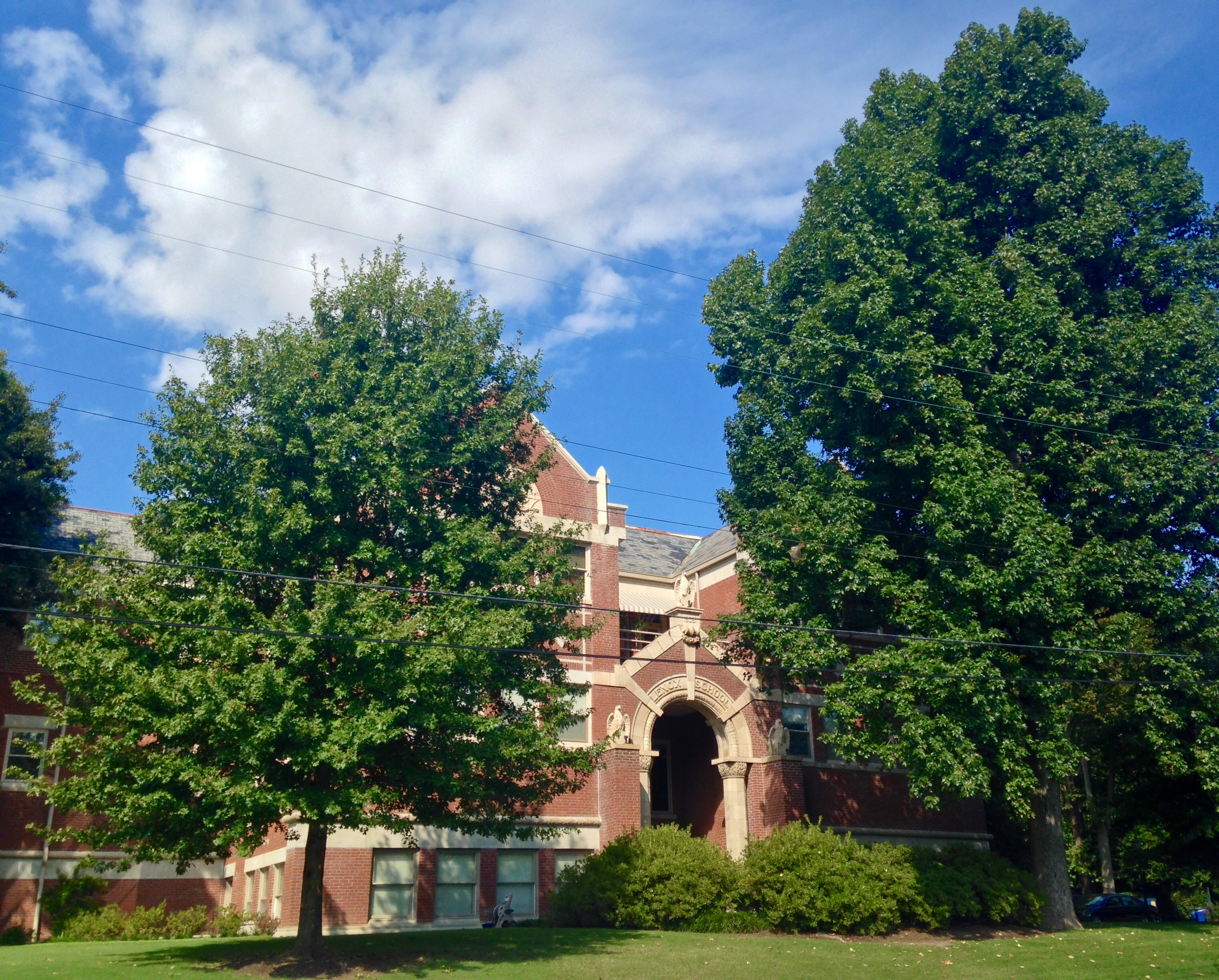
The former Lenox School

Lenox is a neighborhood in Memphis, Tennessee. It is bounded by Central Avenue in the south, Union Avenue in the north, Cooper Street in the west and East Parkway South in the east.

Prior to 1909, when it was annexed by the City of Memphis, Lenox was its own incorporated municipality. Perhaps one of the most architecturally-significant landmarks in Lenox is Lenox School, which was an elementary school before being converted into condominiums in 1981.

Lenox is home to approximately 2,333 residents. The community reflects the diversity and vibrancy characteristic of Midtown Memphis. Lenox is part of a larger population of 1,337,779 people in the Memphis metropolitan area. Over the past decade, the total population has seen a slight decline of 0.24%. Within this community, 63.4% of households are family households, with an average of 2.53 individuals per household.
