= Union Avenue United Methodist Church =

Historic church in Tennessee, United States

- Union Avenue Methodist Episcopal Church, South
- Formerly listed on the U.S. National Register of Historic Places
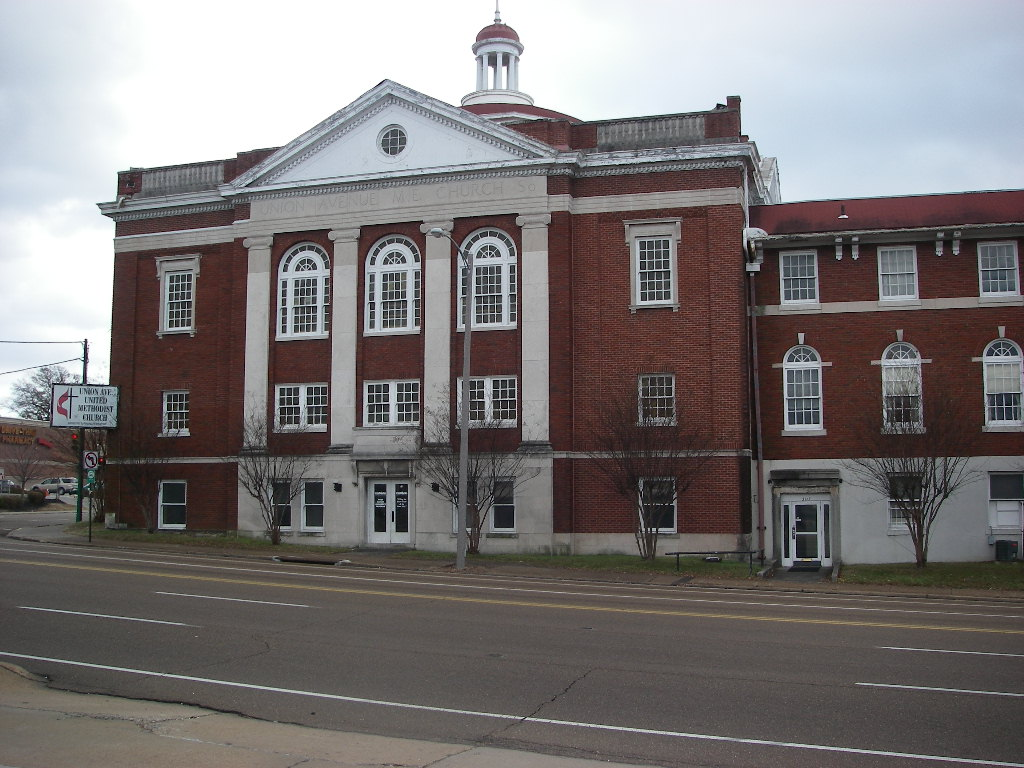
- The church building in 2011, prior to its demolition.

- Location within Tennessee Location within the United States
- Location: 2117 Union Ave, Memphis, Tennessee
- Coordinates: 35°7′52″N 89°59′14″W
- Area: less than one acre
- Built: 1914
- Architect: John Gaisford, Hubert Thomas McGhee
- Architectural style: Classical Revival
- Demolished: 2011
- NRHP reference No.: 87000399

Significant dates
- Added to NRHP: March 6, 1987
- Removed from NRHP: March 27, 2013

Union Avenue United Methodist Church was a historic church building in Memphis, Tennessee, that is listed on the National Register of Historic Places under the name Union Avenue Methodist Episcopal Church, South. The building was located on a street corner at 2117 Union Avenue.

The building was no longer in use as a church when it was sold in February 2011 to CVS Pharmacy. The company paid $2.25 million for the church property and also paid $650,000 to buy an adjoining property from a different owner. Demolition of the structure began in March 2011.

Members of the family that sold the land for church use in 1912 attempted to block the sale to CVS on the basis of a restrictive covenant in the deed that required the property to be used as a "place of divine worship."
