= Central Gardens, Memphis =

Neighborhood of Memphis, Tennessee

Coordinates: 35.1346°N 90.0087°W

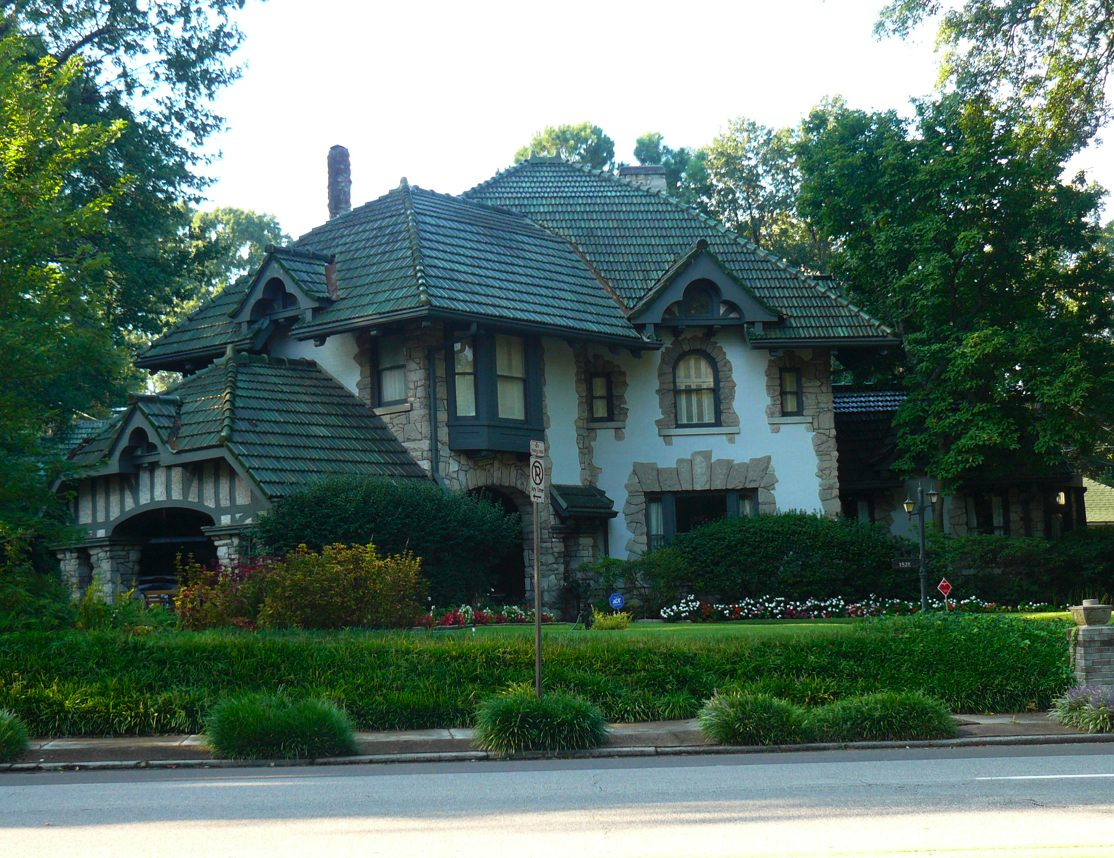
An American Craftsman style home in Memphis' Central Gardens historic neighborhood

Central Gardens is a historic Memphis neighborhood in Midtown.

== Geography ==
Central Gardens is bound by York Avenue on the south, Eastmoreland Avenue on the north, Rembert Street on the east, and Cleveland Street on the west.

== History ==
Listed on the National Register of Historic Places, Central Gardens was built primarily between 1850 and 1930 and originally served as home to the city's wealthy middle-class residents who moved east during the heyday of the cotton boom along with the expanding city limits, which by 1900 shifted to East Parkway in what is now Midtown. Originally part of the estate of Solomon Rozelle, who had settled in Shelby County in 1815 on 1,600 acres of then wooded wilderness, the land that became Central Gardens was inherited by Rozelle's children upon his death in 1840, according to historian Barbara B. Viser. Records from 1853 document that C. W. Rozelle owned 30 acres of what became Central Gardens. Also in 1853, Judge William Roland Harris bought 40 acres from B. L. Rozelle and built his home, Clanlo Hall, on what is now Central Avenue. Clanlo and the Rozelle House on Harbert Avenue, both c. 1853, were the only two homes in the neighborhood at the time. They are the oldest homes in Central Gardens. Unlike the nearby Annesdale neighborhood, which was created as a smaller, single subdivision, Central Gardens is made up of several subdivisions, such as Merriman Park, the Harbert Place subdivision, Bonnie Crest, as well as several large estates that were subdivided.

Viser identifies 1900–1929 as the "boom years" for Central Gardens, the period in which it was "the newest, most prestigious neighborhood" in Memphis, with homes ranging from "elegant mansions to Queen Anne cottages and cozy bungalows." Streetcars provided convenient transportation to downtown Memphis.

Central Gardens has been home to Mayor E. H. Crump, Clarence Saunders, Mayor Walter Chandler, Memphis grocer Frank Montesi Sr., photographer William Eggleston, Judge Julia Smith Gibbons, U.S. Representative Steve Cohen, entrepreneur Abe Plough, preservationist June West, and Crissy Haslam, wife of Tennessee governor Bill Haslam.

== Culture ==
=== Churches, schools, and libraries ===
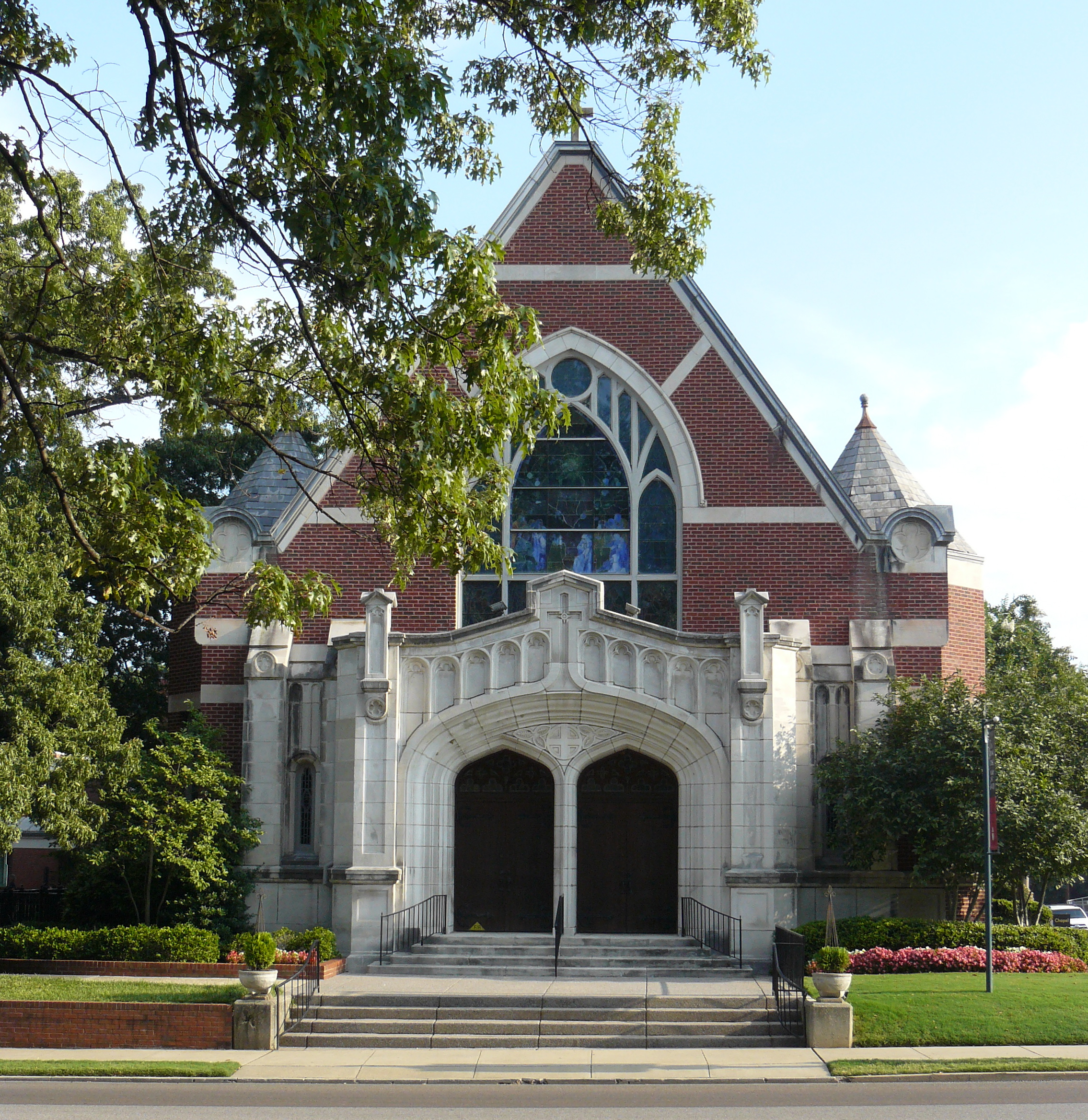
Grace-St. Luke's Episcopal Church, built in 1912, is located in the center of Central Gardens

Grace-St. Luke's Episcopal Church (constructed in 1912) and the Catholic Cathedral of the Immaculate Conception (1938) are located in Central Gardens. Both the church and the cathedral have adjoining schools. Central Christian Church, located at the corner of South McLean since 1924, is part of the Christian Church (Disciples of Christ) denomination.

Grace-St. Luke's Episcopal School, a coeducational parish day school established in 1947, serves over 500 students in PK - 8th grade. Known as GSL, the school is located at the corner of Belvedere Boulevard and Peabody Avenue.

Immaculate Conception Cathedral School, located on Central Avenue, is a coeducational elementary school and an all-girls college preparatory high school. Idlewild Elementary School is part of the Memphis City Schools system.

Just outside Central Gardens is Central High School, a public high school (grades 9–12) in Memphis, Tennessee. It was founded in 1897 and is considered the first high school in Memphis; Central is often called "THE" High School. It is a part of the Memphis City Schools Optional School system where it is recognized as a school specializing in college preparatory programs. Central High's building is on the List of Registered Historic Places in Tennessee.

From 1955 until 2001, the main library of the Memphis Public Library System was located in Central Gardens at the corner of Peabody and South McLean.

=== Architecture ===
Central Gardens, composed of approximately 83 blocks, 1,540 structures and 511 acres (2.07 km^{2}) in Midtown Memphis, has an architectural style that is highly eclectic. It reflects the prevailing tastes among early twentieth century middle class Memphians, and the best in urban residential community planning and architecture of that period. The wide variety of architectural styles works well because of uniform setbacks, cornice heights and massing, and the characteristic use of such details as front porches, bay window, porte-cochère, and leaded glass. The building materials include brick, limestone, stucco, clapboard, and wooden shingles, with many houses constructed of a mix of two or three of these. Workmanship is of a consistently high quality, and the detailing is extremely rich and well-conceived. With only a few exceptions, the architecture is more "mid-American" than "Southern"; according to architectural historian Vincent Scully, Central Gardens houses bear a closer resemblance to those in Oak Park, Illinois rather than to those in Natchez, Mississippi.

The most prevalent architectural forms found in the district are the American foursquare and bungalow. Principal styles include Colonial Revival, American Craftsman, Eclectic, Mediterranean Revival, Mission, Neoclassical, Prairie School, Queen Anne, Tudor Revival, and Shingle style. While this architecture is fairly common, the superior quality of design, workmanship, materials and details is significantly uncommon. The mix of architectural styles contained in a typical district block achieves a very strong compositional harmony because virtually all houses adhere to the same rules of massing, scale, and cornice height setback and lot size.

Since 1967, the architecture and the stories behind selected homes in the district have been shared publicly each September during the neighborhood association's annual Central Gardens Home and Garden Tour. The tour is usually attended by more than 2,000 people.

Among the architects whose works are represented by homes in the district are

- Neander M. Woods, who "may have been Memphis' most inventive architect of the first quarter of the 20th century,"
- Mahan & Broadwell, who designed many of the Tudor and Italian homes on South McLean near Central,
- Walk C. Jones Sr. and Max Furbinger, partners "from 1904 to 1935, the peak of Midtown's construction boom,"
- J. Frazer Smith, whose own Peabody Avenue home reflected the same antebellum plantation design that inspired his history of Southern Architecture, White pillars: early life and architecture of the Lower Mississippi Valley country (1940) and
- Francis Gassner, whose Harbert Avenue home's design reflected the Modernist International Style of the mid-twentieth century.

==== Gallery of homes in Central Gardens ====
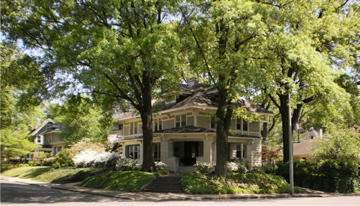

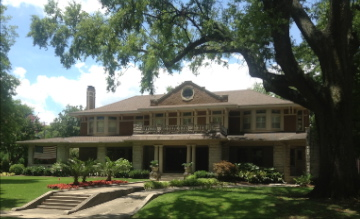

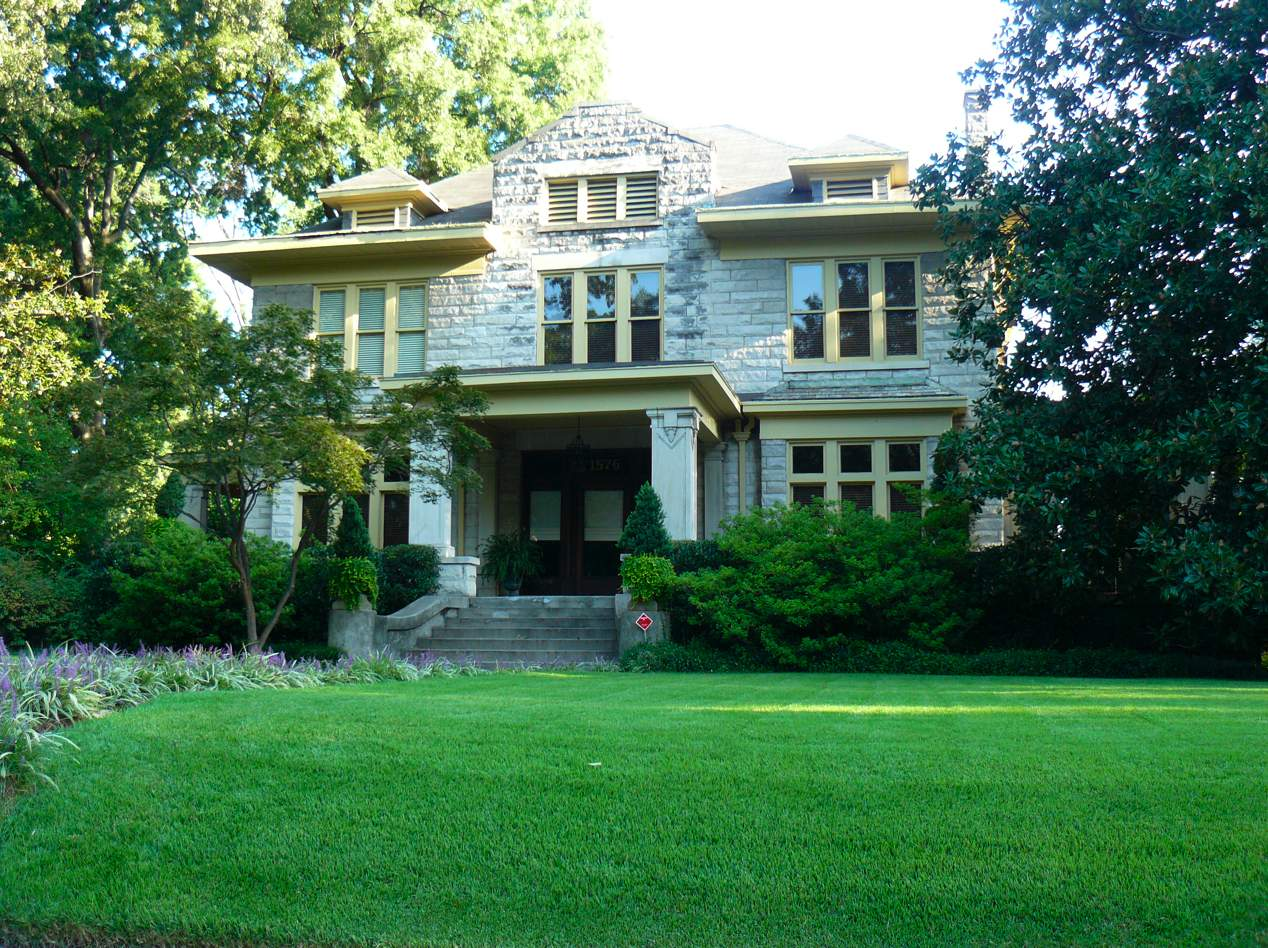

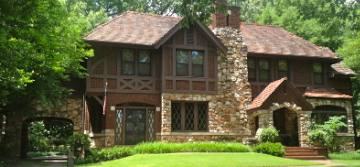

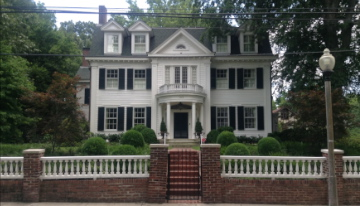

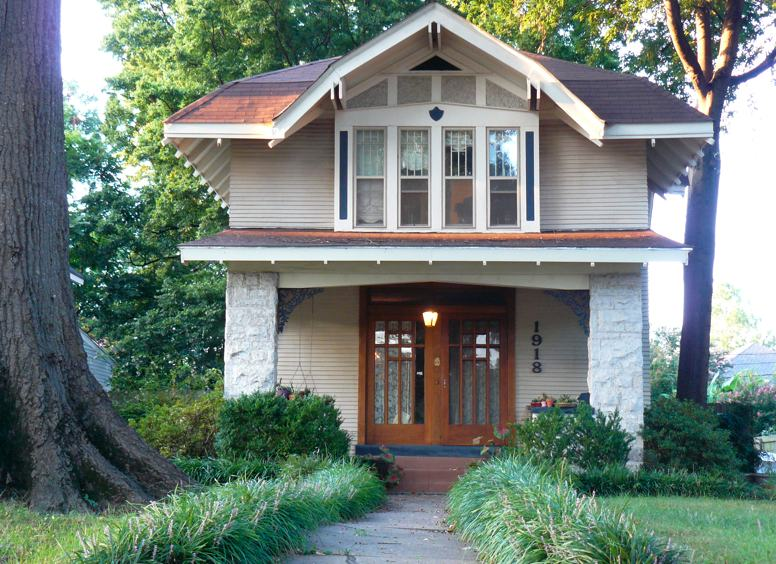

=== Historic preservation and annual home and garden tour ===
Central Gardens is one of Memphis' three historic conservation zones. The designation means that a property owner seeking a building permit for exterior work must receive a Certificate of Appropriateness (COA) from Memphis Landmarks Commission. Design Guidelines are available for all projects that require a COA.

The Commercial Appeal wrote the "inner-city neighborhood offers an elegant, inspiring reminder of how urban decay, middle-class flight and mind-numbing architecture don't have to rule the day. Central Gardens dazzled last week's home-tour crowd with its leafy green, walkable and surprisingly diverse urban landscape. You couldn't help but envy the people who live there. It's beautiful, well-maintained and 100 years old."

=== Arboretum status ===
Central Gardens was designated as a level 3 arboretum by the state of Tennessee in 2008 and recertified in December 2019. One of just two in Tennessee, it is the only level 3 arboretum in West Tennessee. The designation noted that "many of the trees are well over 80+ years and this arboretum has well over the 90 different species of trees needed to be considered a level 3."

"Since arboretums are usually found in a botanical garden or park, what makes the Central Gardens Arboretum so special is its neighborhood context," Ted Morton wrote. "Residents and visitors can see the trees in an urban setting, amid houses and streets and in ideal growing conditions." The status "officially recognizes the critical role trees play in defining the unique character and beauty of " Central Gardens.

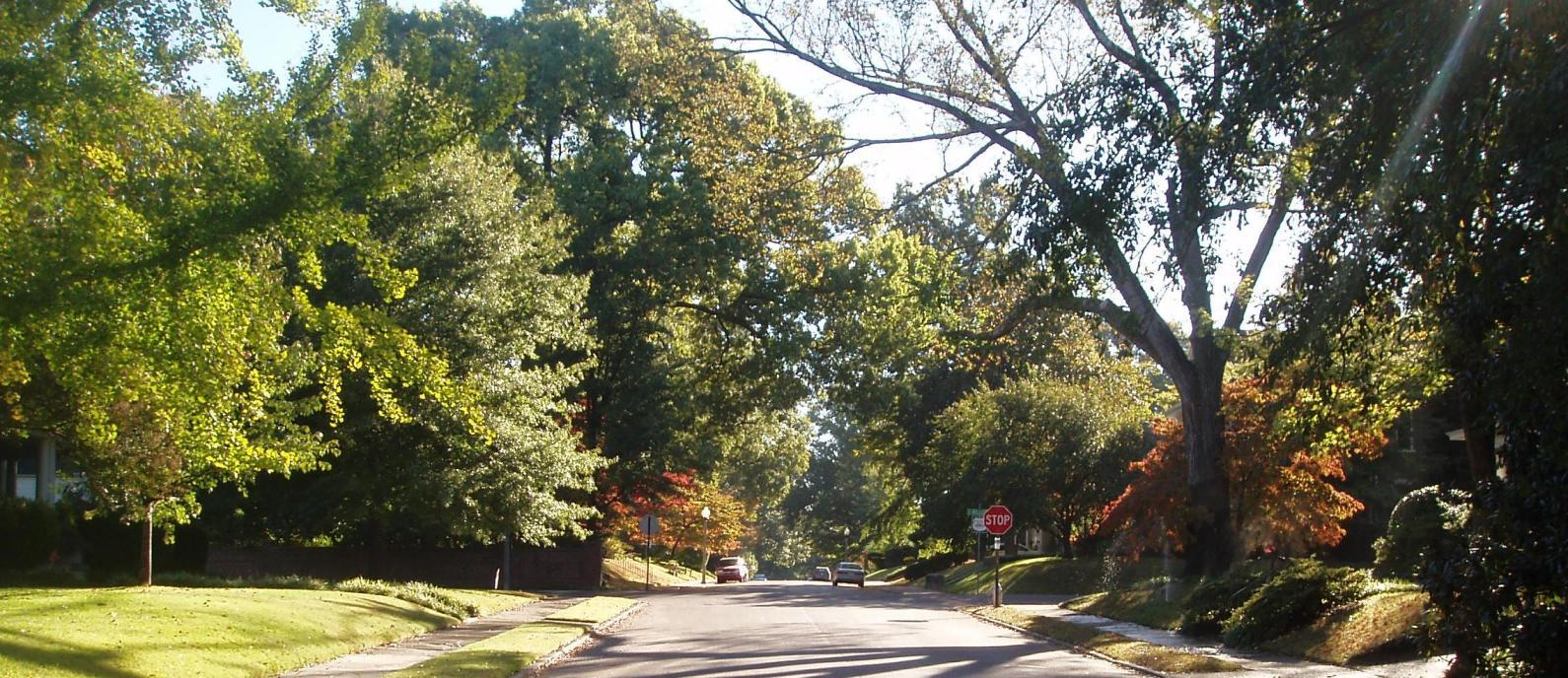
The intersection of Carr Avenue and South Willett Street is an example of Central Gardens' designation as a level 3 arboretum, one of only two in Tennessee

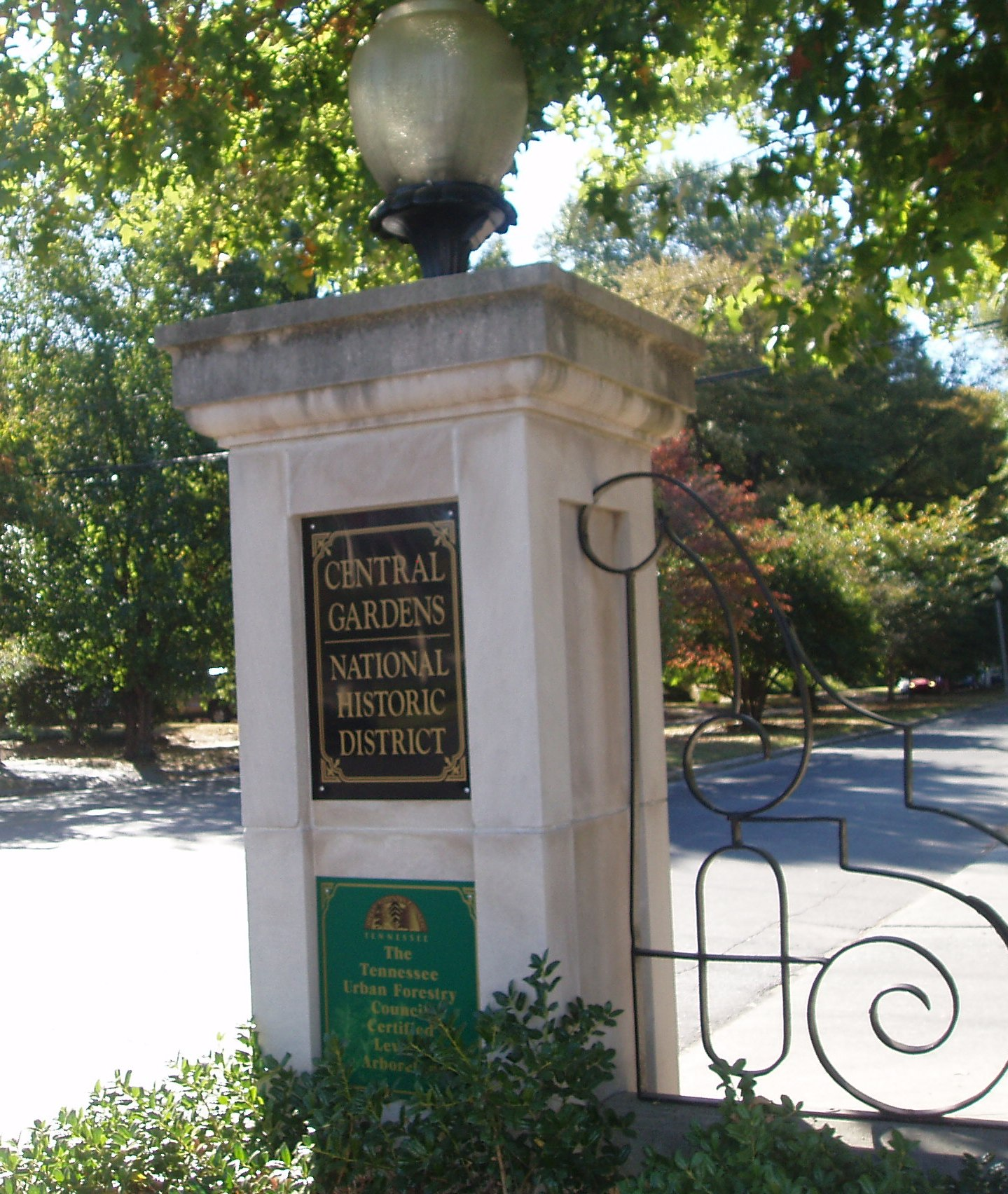
The Belvedere Boulevard entrance to Central Gardens
