= Evergreen, Memphis =

- Evergreen Historic District
- U.S. National Register of Historic Places
- U.S. Historic district
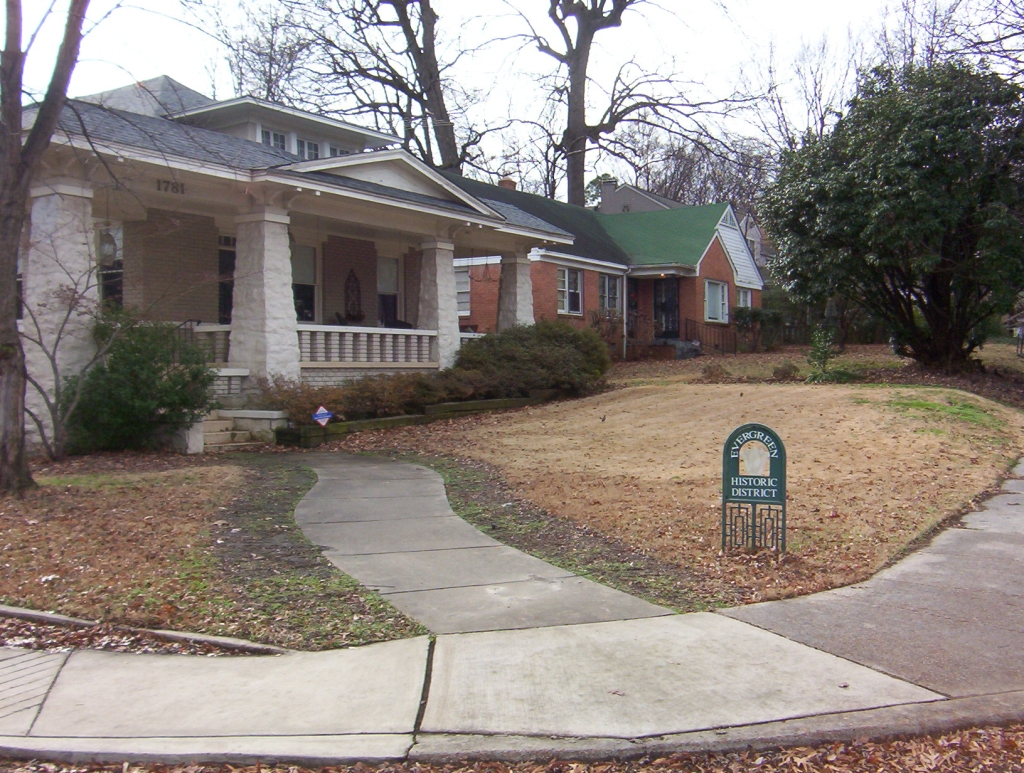

- Location within Tennessee Location within the United States
- Location: Roughly bounded by N. Parkway, Kenilworth St., Watkins St., and Court Ave; Memphis, Tennessee
- Coordinates: 35.1479°N 90.0072°W
- Area: 100 acres (40 ha)
- Architectural style: Bungalow/Craftsman, Late 19th And 20th Century Revivals
- NRHP reference No.: 85000080
- Added to NRHP: January 11, 1985

Evergreen Historic District is one of the oldest neighborhoods in Memphis, Tennessee.

== Geography ==
The Evergreen Historic District is bounded on the South by Poplar Avenue from its intersection with East Parkway to Avalon Street. The district boundary then follows Avalon Street to Court Avenue. The district boundary then follows Court Avenue westward until its intersection with Stonewall Avenue. The district boundary then continues North on Stonewall until its intersection with Poplar, at which point in the west direction Poplar is again the Southern boundary until its intersection with Cleveland.

The Evergreen Historic District is bounded on the East by East Parkway, from the West by Cleveland Avenue, and from the North by North Parkway.

Properties on the North adjacent North Parkway, on the South adjacent Court Avenue between Avalon Street and McNeil Street, and properties on the South side of Poplar Avenue between Kenilworth Place and Cleveland are also included within the boundaries of Evergreen Historic District.

Evergreen is located in the area of Memphis known as Midtown. This area of the city includes Overton Park, which is one of the largest urban parks in the nation; it also includes the Memphis Zoo.

== Community ==
Evergreen is unique to Midtown because there is a mix of old and new homes, due to the attempt to split the neighborhood, and Overton Park, in half to make way for Interstate 40 (see Sam Cooper Boulevard). The neighborhood was able to fight the interstate, and the case eventually went all the way to the U.S. Supreme Court, which ruled in favor of the neighborhood. Many of the homes were demolished, but in the early 90s, bids started and builders repatched the holes in Evergreen. Today, the neighborhood is listed on the National Register of Historic Places
