= History of Memphis, Tennessee =

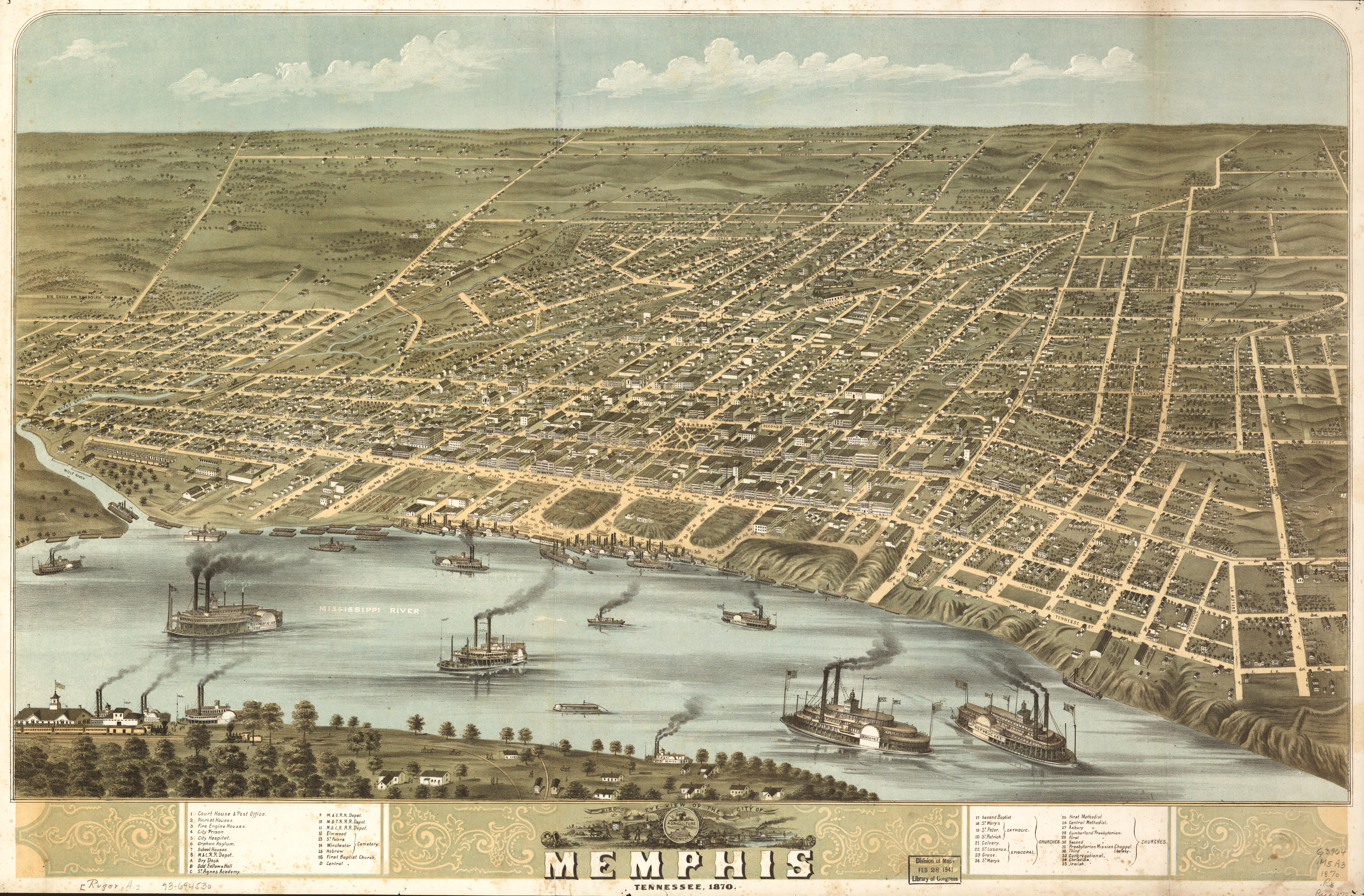
Historic aerial view of Memphis (1870)

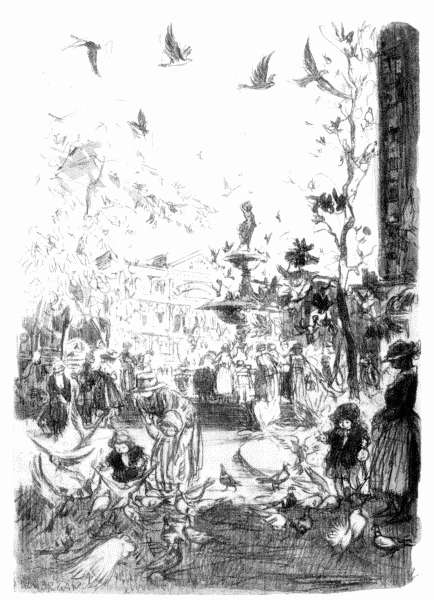
Court Square in Memphis (c. 1917)

The history of Memphis, Tennessee and its area began many thousands of years ago with succeeding cultures of indigenous peoples. In the first millennium, it was settled by the Mississippian culture. The Chickasaw Indian tribe emerged about the 17th century, or migrated into the area. The earliest European exploration may have encountered remnants of the Mississippian culture by Spanish explorer Hernando de Soto. Later French explorers led by René-Robert Cavelier, Sieur de La Salle likely encountered the Chickasaw. The city of Memphis was not founded until 1819. The city was named after the ancient capital of Egypt on the Nile River in North Africa.

It rapidly developed as a major trading center for cotton cultivated at the region's large plantations and dependent on the work of enslaved African Americans. In the 19th century, and especially 1878 and 1879, the city suffered severe yellow fever epidemics. In 1878 tens of thousands of residents fled and more than 5,000 died, with hundreds more dying in the next year's epidemic, causing the city to go bankrupt and give up its charter until 1893.

By the early 20th century, cotton was still a major commodity crop; Memphis grew into the world's largest spot cotton market and the world's largest hardwood lumber market. During the 1960s the city was at the center of civil rights actions, with a major strike by city sanitation workers in 1968. Having come to the city to support the workers, Rev. Martin Luther King Jr. was assassinated by a lone sniper on April 4, 1968, at the Lorraine Motel. Many notable blues musicians grew up in and around the Memphis and northern Mississippi area. These included musical artists such as Muddy Waters, Robert Johnson, B.B. King, Howlin' Wolf, Isaac Hayes, Young Dolph and Elvis Presley.

== Early history ==
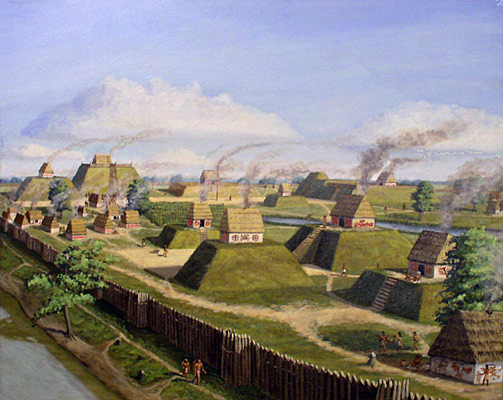
The Mississippian culture was a mound-building Native American culture that flourished in the United States in the first millennium before the arrival of Europeans

From about 10,000 BCE, Paleo-Indians and later Archaic-Indians lived as communities of hunter-gatherers in the area that covers the modern-day southern United States. Approximately 800 CE to 1600 CE, the Mississippi River Delta was populated by tribes of the Mississippian culture, a mound-building Native American people who had developed in the late Woodland Indian period. The Tipton phase people were a local expression of the Mississippian culture. They inhabited the region of modern-day Tipton, Lauderdale and Shelby counties during the time of first contact with Europeans, at the arrival of the de Soto Expedition.

By the end of the Mississippian period, the land was claimed and populated by the Chickasaw tribe. The exact origins of the Chickasaw are uncertain. Noted historian Horatio Cushman indicates that the Chickasaw, along with the Choctaw, may have had origins in present-day Mexico and migrated north. When Europeans first encountered them, the Chickasaw were living in villages in what is now Mississippi, with a smaller number in the area of Savannah Town, South Carolina. Twentieth-century scholar Patricia Galloway says that the Chickasaw may have been migrants to the area from the west and may not have been descendants of the pre-historic Mississippian culture. Their oral history supports this, indicating they moved along with the Choctaw from west of the Mississippi in pre-history.

These people (the choctaw) are the only nation from whom I could learn any idea of a traditional account of a first origin; and that is their coming out of a hole in the ground, which they shew between their nation and the Chickasaws; they tell us also that their neighbours were surprised at seeing a people rise at once out of the earth."

— Bernard Romans- Natural History of East and West Florida

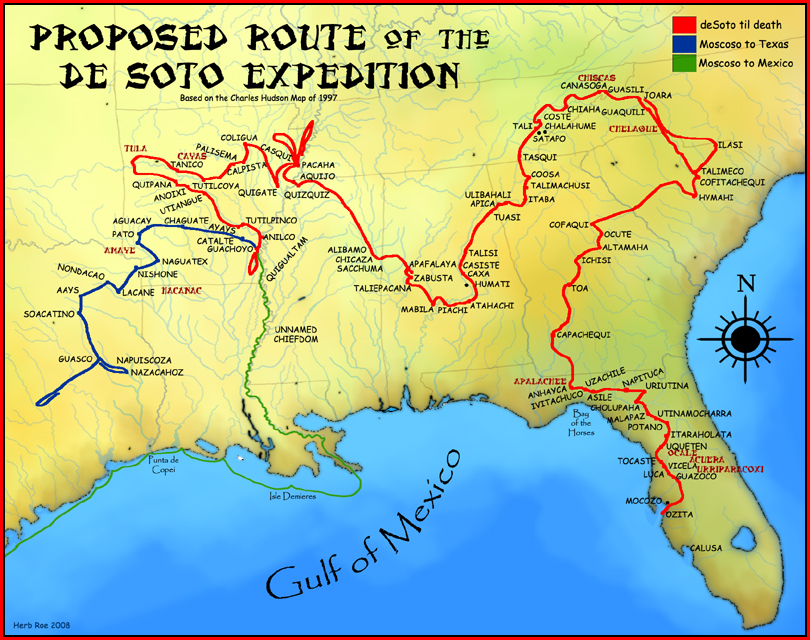
A proposed route for the de Soto Expedition, based on the Charles M. Hudson map of 1997

=== European explorers – 16th/17th centuries ===
European exploration came years later, with Spanish explorer Hernando de Soto believed to have visited what is now the Memphis area as early as the 1540s.

By the 1680s, French explorers led by René-Robert Cavelier, Sieur de La Salle built Fort Prudhomme in the vicinity, the first European settlement in what would become Memphis, predating Anglo-American settlement in East Tennessee by more than 70 years. Fort Assumption was a French fortification constructed in 1739 on the fourth Chickasaw Bluff on the Mississippi River by Jean-Baptiste Le Moyne, Sieur de Bienville's French army. The fort was used as a base against the Chickasaw in the abortive Campaign of 1739.

Despite such early outposts, the land comprising present-day Memphis remained in a largely unorganized territory throughout most of the 18th century in terms of European settlement. The boundaries of what would become Tennessee continued to evolve from its parent — the Carolina Colony, later North Carolina and South Carolina. In 1796, the site became the westernmost point of the newly admitted "state" of Tennessee in the newly independent United States. However, West Tennessee was at that time occupied and historically controlled by the Chickasaw tribe, owned by possession and tribal rights.

On April 3, 1790, promotion of a town at Chickasaw Bluffs was undertaken with leases offered by John Rice, Esq. of Cumberland or purchases to families that arrived at the landing near the mouth of the Big Hatcha-river.

== 19th century ==
=== Foundation – 1819 ===
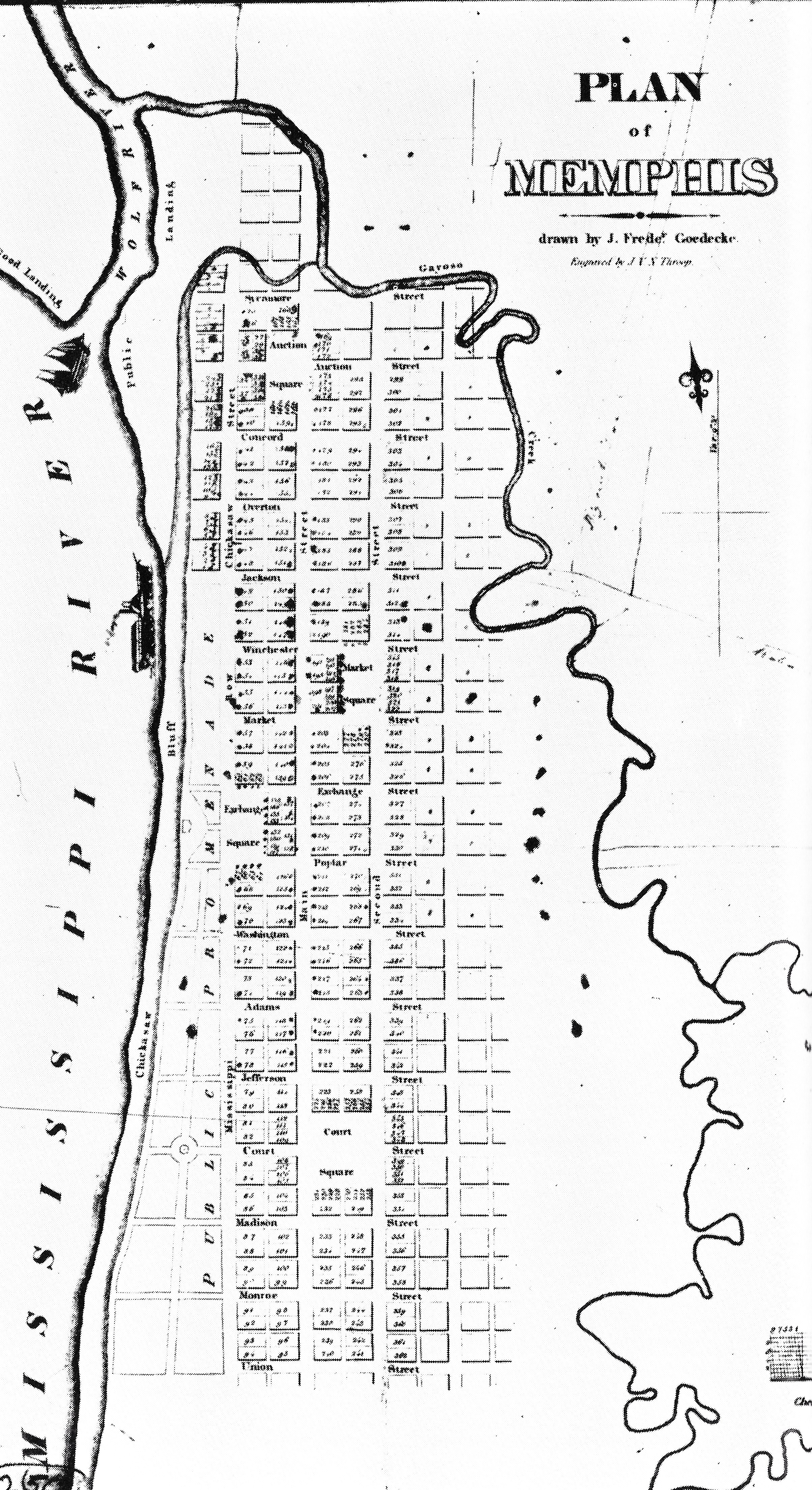
The original plan for Memphis, as surveyed in 1819.

The area of West Tennessee became available for white settlement after the Federal Government purchased it from the Chickasaw Nation in the 1818 Jackson Purchase. Memphis was founded on May 22, 1819, by a group of investors, John Overton, James Winchester, and Andrew Jackson, and was incorporated as a city in 1826. The city was named after the ancient capital of Egypt on the Nile River, itself named Memphis in Greek after the Egyptian name Mennefer for the Pyramid complex of pharaoh Pepi I. The founders planned for a large city to be built on the site and laid out a plan featuring a regular grid of streets interrupted by four town squares, to be named Exchange, Market, Court, and Auction. Of these squares Market, Court, and Auction remain as public parks in downtown Memphis. The Exchange square site was developed in the 20th century as the Cook Convention Center.

Memphis was a departure point on the Mississippi River for Native Americans removed in the 1830s from their historic lands to Indian Territory on the Trail of Tears. In 1831 French writer Alexis De Tocqueville witnessed "a numerous band of Choctaws" crossing the River at Memphis. The State of Mississippi insisted the boundary with the State of Tennessee be resurveyed with the object of some advocates being the capture of the young city of Memphis, but the new boundary proved Memphis was well outside the bounds.

The city grew in the 19th century as a center for transporting, grading and marketing the growing volumes of cotton produced in the nearby Mississippi Delta (for background, see "King Cotton"). The cotton economy of the antebellum South depended on the forced labor of hundreds of thousands of African-American slaves, and Memphis became a major slave market. Prior to the Civil War, one quarter of the city's population were slaves. Seeking their freedom, many slaves turned to the Underground Railroad to escape to the free states of the North, and the Memphis home of Jacob Burkle was a way-station on their route to freedom.

The Gayoso House Hotel was built overlooking the Mississippi River in 1842 and became a Memphis landmark; it stood until 1899, where it burned down. The original Gayoso House was a first-class hotel, designed by James H. Dakin, a well-known architect of that era, and was appointed with the latest conveniences, including indoor plumbing with marble tubs, silver faucets and flush toilets. In 1857 the Memphis & Charleston Railroad was completed, linking an Atlantic Ocean port and one on the Mississippi River. Memphis was one of the two eastern termini of the Butterfield Overland Mail stagecoach route to California from 1857 to 1861. Through the railroad, Memphis traders could export cotton through Charleston, South Carolina, to London and the European continent.

=== Competing towns: Hopefield, AR and Randolph, TN ===
Hopefield, Arkansas was founded by the Spanish Governor in 1795, across from Memphis near present-day West Memphis, Arkansas. Hopefield became the eastern terminal for the Memphis and Little Rock Railroad in 1857 and prospered until the Civil War. It was burned by Union forces in retaliation for Confederate Raids. Although Hopefield was rebuilt afterward, it was destroyed in a flood. The area of Crittenden County, Arkansas has been subject to some of the country's most disastrous floods, due to the Mississippi River backing into the St. Francis River. These frequent disasters have prevented much population growth on the Arkansas side. Because of its location on a bluff, Memphis was not subject to flooding.

Randolph, Tennessee was founded in the 1820s at the second Chickasaw Bluff upriver of Memphis; for a time it was a major competitor to Memphis for commerce along the Mississippi River. However, Randolph gradually lost commerce and influence to Memphis, particularly after it was bypassed by railroad construction.

=== Civil War ===
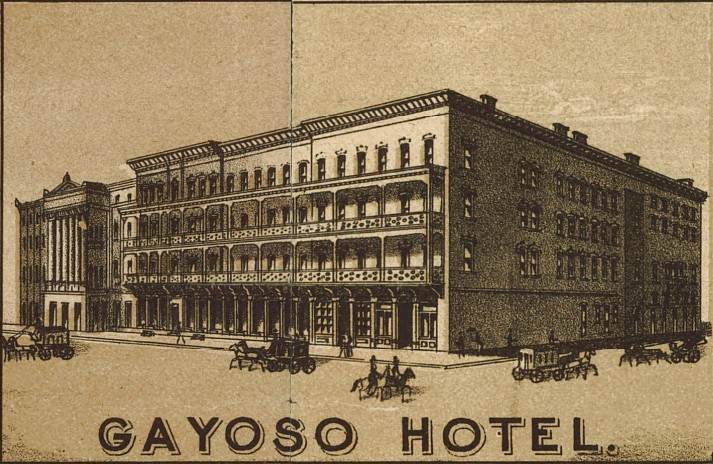
Gayoso House Hotel (1887)

At the time of the American Civil War, Memphis was already an important regional city because of its river trade and railroad connections, particularly the Memphis and Charleston Railroad, the only east–west rail link across the South. Tennessee seceded from the Union in June 1861 and Memphis briefly became a Confederate stronghold.

Union forces moving down the Mississippi River captured Memphis from the Confederacy in the First Battle of Memphis on June 6, 1862. The city remained under Union control for the duration of the war, except for a dramatic raid conducted by Nathan Bedford Forrest. During that time the Gayoso House Hotel was a Union headquarters. According to local legend, General Forrest's brother Captain William Forrest, an escort on the raid, rode his horse into the lobby seeking to capture a Union general.

Memphis became a Union supply base and continued to prosper throughout the war. The city became a focus for illicit trade in raw cotton, which was in great demand by northern cotton mills because of the Union blockade and the Confederate embargo. In January 1863 Charles Dana, a special investigator for the Federal War Department, reported from Memphis that a "mania" for illicit cotton had "corrupted and demoralized" Union Army officers.

Thousands of slaves with families fled from rural plantations to Union lines, and the Army established a contraband camp south of the city lines. By 1865, there were 20,000 blacks in the city, a sevenfold increase from the 3,000 before the war. The presence of black Union soldiers was resented by ethnic whites in the city; thousands of Irish had immigrated since the mid-19th century. In 1866 there was a major massacre with whites attacking blacks. Forty-five blacks were reported killed, and nearly twice as many wounded; much of their makeshift housing was destroyed. By 1870, the black population was 15,000 in a city total of 40,226.

=== Post Civil War ===
Memphis emerged from the Civil War undamaged from the fighting. On July 24, 1866, Tennessee was the first southern state to be re-admitted to the Union.

The Memphis Cotton Exchange was founded in 1873 by a group of cotton traders led by Napoleon Hill. Hill became immensely wealthy with interests in wholesale groceries, railroads, steel and banking, as well as cotton, and was known to his contemporaries as "the merchant prince of Memphis". He built an ornate French Renaissance style mansion in Downtown Memphis.

=== Yellow fever epidemics: 1870s ===
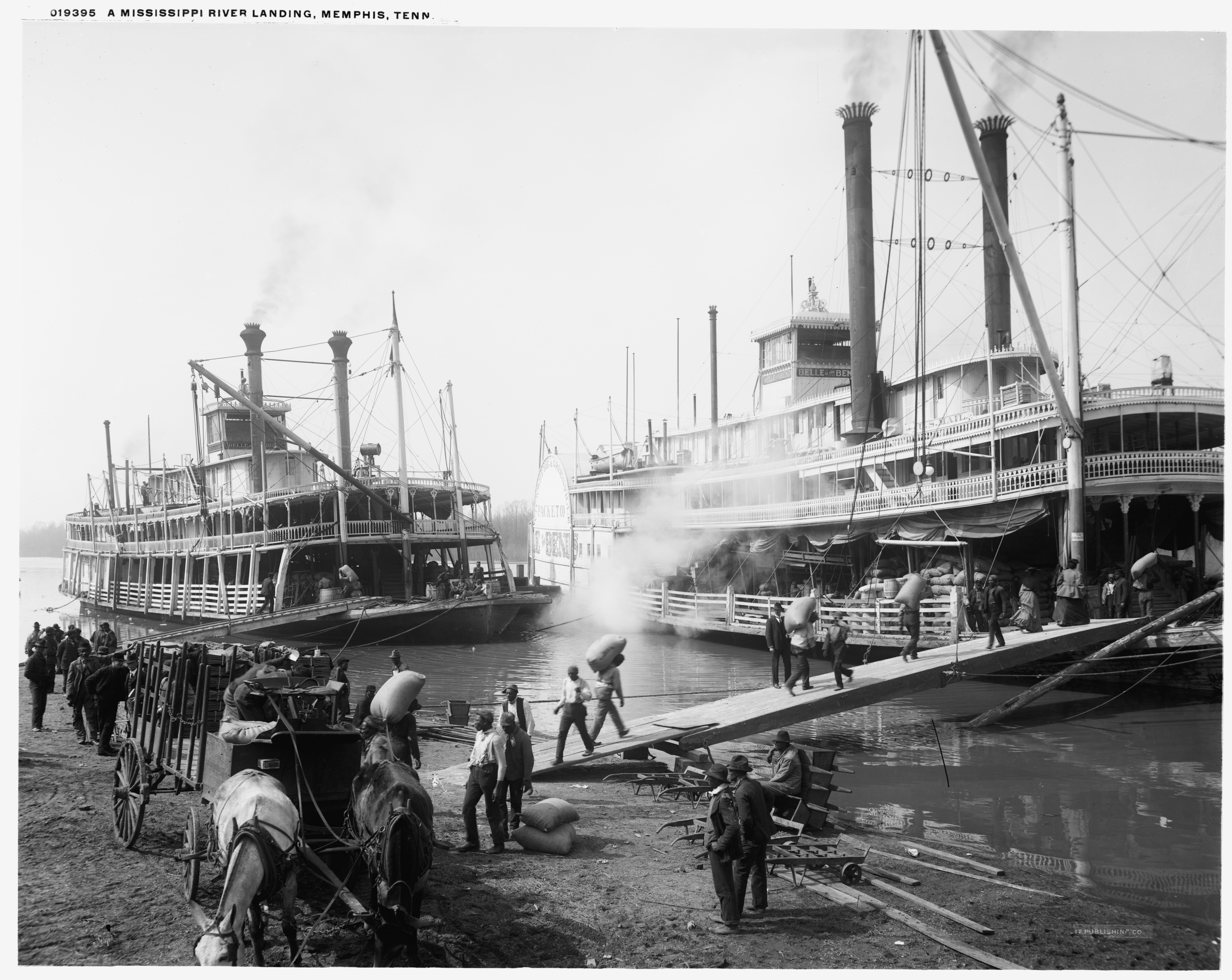
Mississippi riverboats (1906)

Extensive yellow fever epidemics in the 1870s (1873, 1878 and 1879) devastated the city. In 1873 some 2,000 people died, the highest fatalities of any inland city. Because of the severity of the 1873 epidemic, when yellow fever was diagnosed on August 5, 1878, more than 25,000 people left the city within two weeks. Many moved permanently to other cities such as St. Louis and Atlanta. It was reported that such terror gripped the town in August 1878 that fleeing families "left their houses with the doors wide open and silver standing on the sideboards". The population had been roughly 50,000 before the start of the epidemic. Of the 19,000 who stayed in Memphis, 17,000 came down with yellow fever, and 5,150 died.

At that time it was not known that this fatal disease was carried by mosquitoes, so public health measures were unsuccessful. Remaining in the city to care for the sick, a number of Catholic Franciscan Sisters of Mary, Episcopalian nuns of the Sisterhood of St. Mary and clergymen sacrificed themselves. An epidemic also broke out in 1879, in which several hundred people died. So many people died or fled the epidemics that in 1879 Memphis lost its city charter and went bankrupt. Until 1893 Memphis was governed by the state as a Taxing District.

Robert R. Church, Sr., a freedman who became known later as the South's first African-American millionaire (although his total wealth is believed to reach "only" $700,000), was the first citizen to buy a $1,000 bond to pay off the debt and help restore the city's charter. He built much of his wealth by having bought real estate when the city became depopulated after the epidemics. He founded the city's first black-owned bank, Solvent Savings Bank, ensuring that the black community could get loans to establish businesses and buy houses. Because of the drop in city population, blacks gained other opportunities. They were hired to the police force as patrolmen and retained positions in it until 1895, when imposed segregation forced them out.

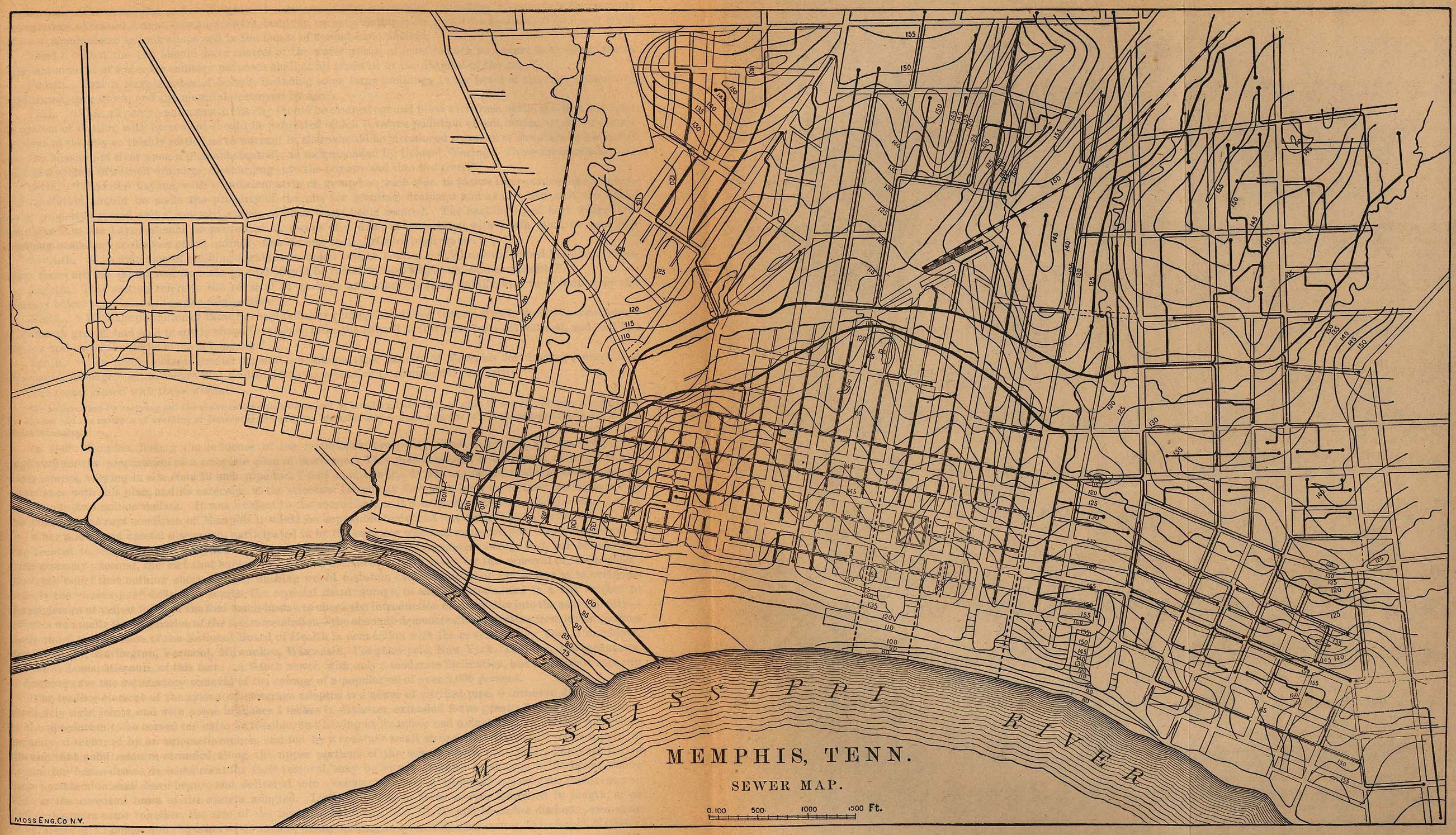
Plan of the Memphis sewer system in 1880

Under a commission form of government, the city made improvements in sanitation, particularly the construction of an innovative sewer system designed by George E. Waring Jr. Construction of the sewers began in January 1880, and by 1893 had expanded to over 50 miles of sewers. This removed the breeding grounds of the mosquito vector. It is likely that survivors' acquired immunity from the 1870s epidemics contributed more to lesser fatalities from the disease in future years. In 1887, a source of abundant and pure artesian water was found beneath the city, which guaranteed its water supply and aided its recovery.

In 1892, the first Mississippi River bridge at Memphis opened. As a result, the city began to prosper again, and it regained its charter and home rule in 1893. African Americans in the city were closed out of many opportunities by the segregated school system, in which their facilities were underfunded, and disenfranchisement by state laws passed in the late 1880s, which resulted in their exclusion from voting and other participation in the political system. State law and local custom imposed a system of Jim Crow based on white supremacy, and in the late 1890s the police force was closed against blacks.

In 1897, as a conspicuous claim to its revival, Memphis had a pyramid-shaped pavilion prominently displayed at the Tennessee Centennial exposition.

== 20th century ==
=== Business development ===
Memphis developed as the world's largest spot cotton market and the world's largest hardwood lumber market, both commodity products of the Mississippi Delta. Into the 1950s, it was the world's largest mule market. Attracting workers from rural areas as well as new immigrants, from 1900 to 1950 the city increased nearly fourfold in population, from 102,350 to 396,000 residents.

Memphis developed an extensive network of parks and public works as part of the national City Beautiful Movement.

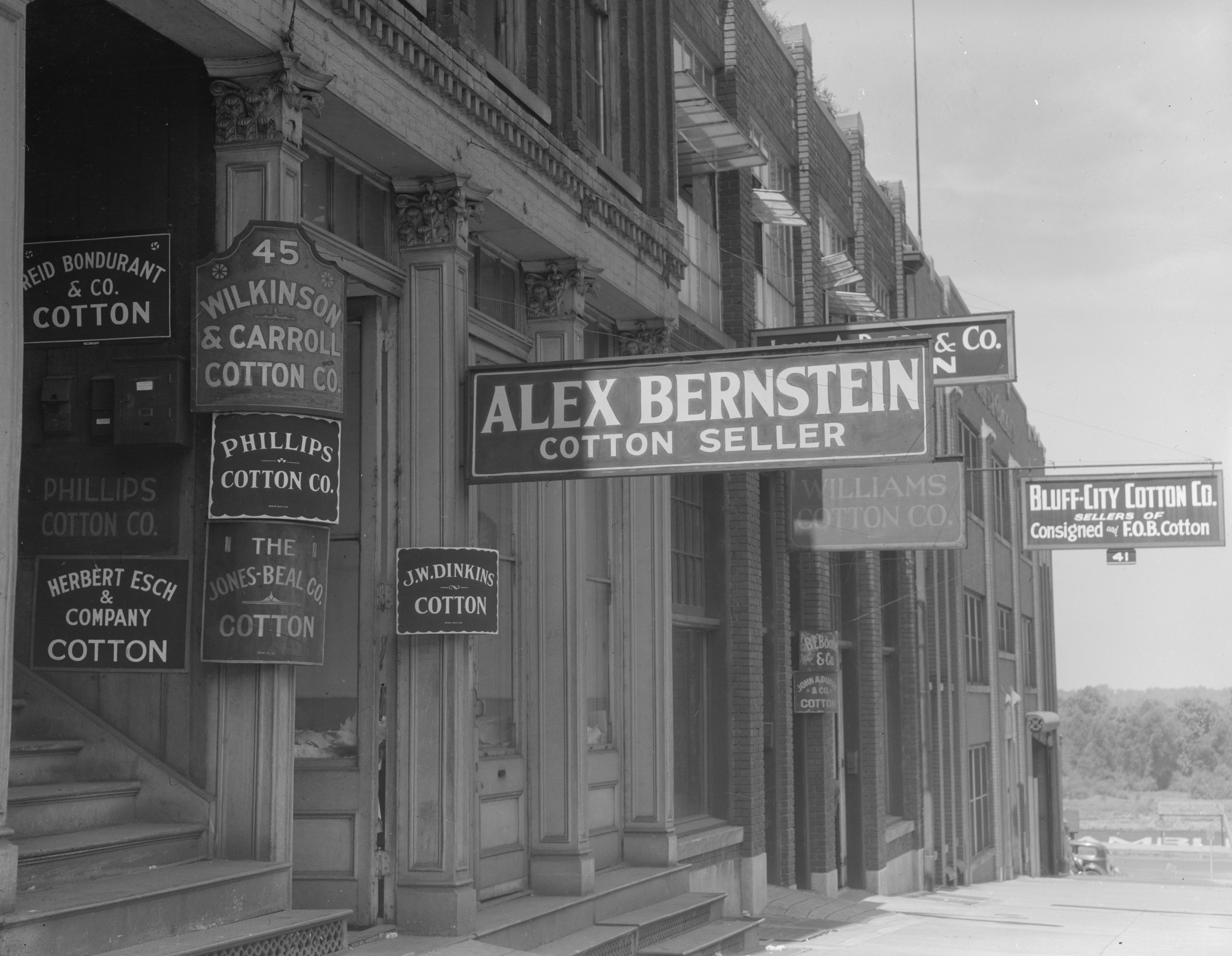
Cotton merchants on Union Avenue (1937)

The Memphis Park and Parkway System (including Overton Park and the later M.L. King Riverside Park) was designed as a comprehensive plan by landscape architect George Kessler at the beginning of the 20th century.

Clarence Saunders, a Memphis inventor and entrepreneur, opened a self-service grocery store in 1916 and founded the first supermarket chain, Piggly Wiggly. Saunders, who became very wealthy from these ventures, lost his fortune on Wall Street and was forced to sell his partly completed Memphis mansion, dubbed the Pink Palace. The Pink Palace was adapted for use as the city's historical and natural history museum. Other parts of the Saunders estate were developed for upscale residences, known as Chickasaw Gardens.

The storied Peabody Hotel opened in 1923 and became a symbol of upper-class Southern elegance. In 1935, Mississippi author David Cohn wrote,

The Mississippi Delta begins in the lobby of the Peabody and ends on Catfish Row in Vicksburg. The Peabody is the Paris Ritz, the Cairo Shepheard's, the London Savoy of this section. If you stand near its fountain in the middle of the lobby, where ducks waddle and turtles drowse, ultimately you will see everybody who is anybody in the Delta.

To the east of the city lay a large railroad yard, with tracks of four railroads of that era. While the railroads were integral to the city's commerce, by the late 1920s the yard had become a barrier to automobile traffic and, hence, to eastward expansion of the city. In 1927–1928 the "Poplar Boulevard Viaduct" was constructed to span the railyards and allow eastward expansion. The viaduct was a joint effort between the City of Memphis and the railroads.

=== Crump machine ===
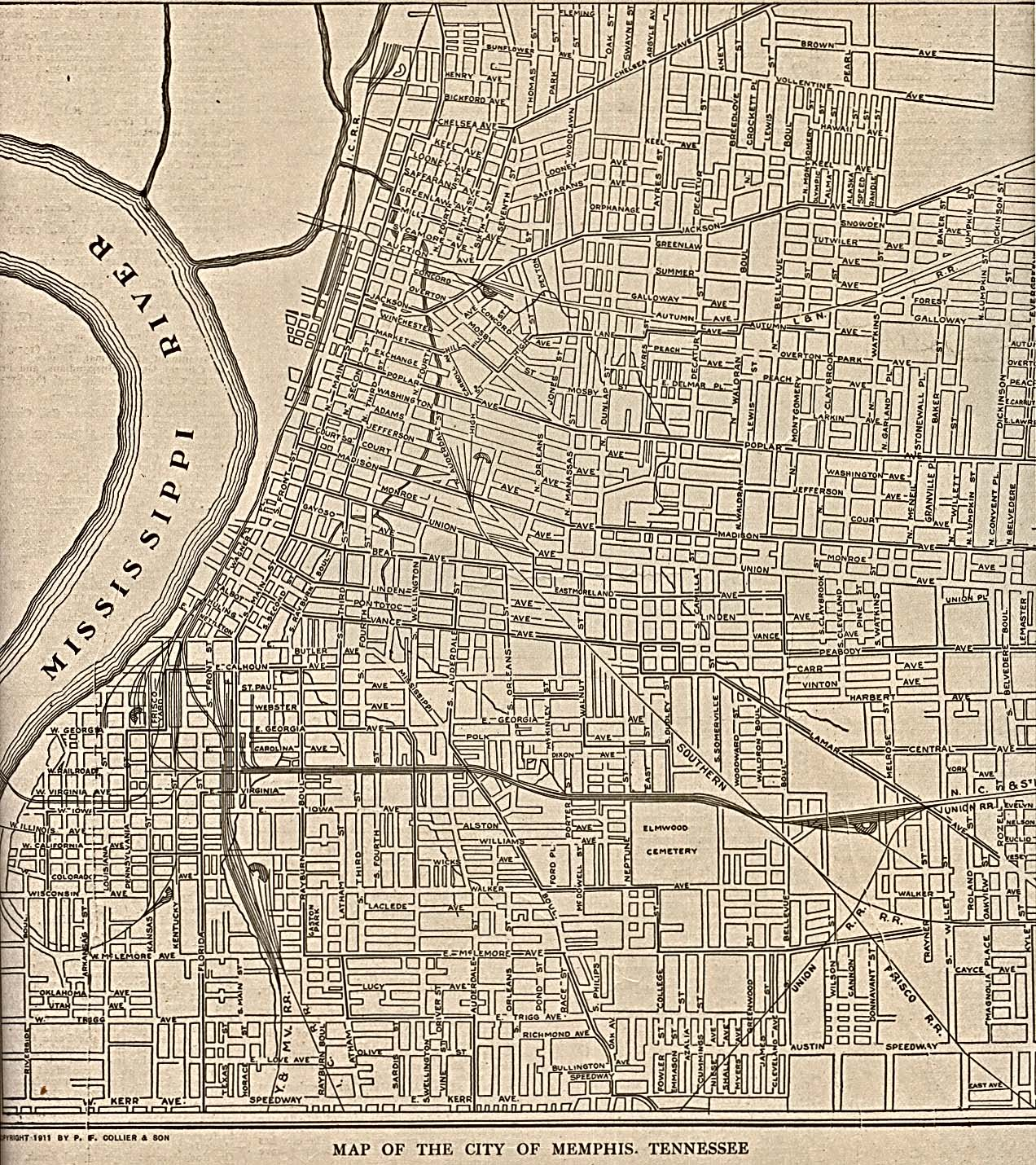
Map of Memphis in 1911

From the 1910s to the 1950s, Memphis was a locus of machine politics under the direction of E. H. "Boss" Crump, a Democrat. He obtained a state law in 1911 to establish a small commission to manage the city. The city retained a form of commission government until 1967, and Crump was in full control at all times until his death in 1954. His management of the city was characterized by numerous techniques of control common among big city bosses, including ballot manipulation, patronage for friends, and frustrating bureaucratic obstacles for the opposition.

Crump built a complex alliance with established power figures at the local, state, and national levels, ensuring that dissidents had little or no voice. At the center of his network was Cotton Row and the business elite that dominated the cotton industry. His coalition also included modernizers, the business-oriented progressives who were most concerned with upgrading the infrastructure of the city, including the waterfront, parks, highways, and skyscrapers, as well as a moderately good school system. To accomplish the goals of the modernizers, working-class whites were well-employed by the Crump machine. AFL labor unions were of marginal influence; CIO unions were not tolerated. Roger Biles argues that the political system was virtually unchanged from 1910 into the 1950s and 1960s, thanks to Crump's wire-pulling. Crump was the leading Tennessee supporter of Franklin Roosevelt and the New Deal. In turn, the city received ample support from federal relief programs, which provided jobs for the unemployed, as selected by local machine lieutenants. The city also became a beneficiary of major federal construction projects, which helped fund the business community. Notably, Crump successfully lobbied Washington for large-scale public housing projects. Crump incorporated the black leadership in his outer circle, dispensing patronage in return for the black vote. Memphis was one of the largest southern cities in which blacks could vote, but segregation was no less rigid than elsewhere in the region.

The city installed a revolutionary sewer system and upgraded sanitation and drainage to prevent another epidemic. Pure water from an artesian well was discovered in the 1880s, securing the city's water supply. The commissioners developed an extensive network of parks and public works as part of the national City Beautiful movement, but did not encourage heavy industry, which might have provided substantial employment for the white working-class population. The lack of representation in city government resulted in the underrepresentation of the poor and minorities. The majority controlled the election of all the at-large positions.

=== World War II: 1950s ===
During the Second World War, the War Department constructed large supply depots in Memphis for the Army and the Army Air Force. The Memphis Army Depot also served as a prisoner-of-war camp, housing 800 Axis prisoners. By the time it closed in 1997, the Memphis Army Depot had 130 buildings on site with more than 4,000,000 square feet (370,000 m^{2}) of enclosed industrial space.

In 1942, the US Navy built the Millington Naval Air Station (now the Naval Support Activity Mid-South) in Millington, Tennessee, just north of Memphis. This 3,500-acre (14 km^{2}) facility provided pilot training during World War II, and later became the major naval air technical training center for enlisted personnel aviation specialty training. It is currently used as a naval personnel center and Headquarters for the US Army Corps of Engineers Finance Center. Its flight facilities have been transferred to civilian use as the Millington Regional Jetport.

The first national motel chain, Holiday Inn, was founded in Memphis by Kemmons Wilson in 1952. His first inn was located in Berclair near the city limit on Summer Avenue, then the main highway to Nashville, Tennessee.

=== Population change ===
In 1970, the Census Bureau reported Memphis' population as 60.8% white and 38.9% black. Suburbanization was attracting wealthier residents to newer housing outside the city. After the riots and court-ordered busing in 1973 to achieve desegregation of public schools, "about 40,000 of the system's 71,000 white students abandon[ed] the system in four years". The city and metropolitan area now both have majority-black populations.

Memphis is well known for its cultural contributions to the identity of the American South. Many renowned musicians grew up in and around Memphis and moved to Chicago and other areas from the Mississippi Delta, carrying their music with them to influence other cities and listeners over radio airwaves. These included such musical greats as Elvis Presley, Jerry Lee Lewis, Muddy Waters, Carl Perkins, Johnny Cash, Robert Johnson, W. C. Handy, B.B. King, Howlin' Wolf, Isaac Hayes, Booker T. Jones, Eric Gales, Al Green, Alex Chilton, Justin Timberlake, Three 6 Mafia, the Sylvers, Jay Reatard, Zach Myers, and many others. Aretha Franklin was born in Memphis.

==== Geographical expansion ====
At the start of the 1950s, Memphis was a compact city with limited boundaries, compared to the sprawl seen today. The southern boundary of the city was an irregular line starting on the Mississippi opposite President's Island, about two miles (3 km) north of Nonconnah Creek. The northern boundary was close to Chelsea Avenue, not much south of the Wolf River but with an unpopulated wetland area beyond the city before reaching the Wolf River. The Eastern Boundary of the city was near Highland Street.

By the mid-1950s, Memphis stretched southward to the Mississippi State Line, but only directly south of President's Island. Such communities as West Junction, Nonconnah, Raines and Oakville still remained beyond the city boundaries, with the southern city line running on the north side of Nonconnah Creek. On the east, most of White Station, Tennessee had been annexed. The Northern boundary of Memphis was the Wolf River.

By the mid-1960s, Memphis had annexed Frayser, Tennessee on the north side of the Wolf River. It had also annexed Berclair, Tennessee and all of White Station on its eastern border, extending south-westward along Poplar Avenue, past the recently built freeway that is today designated I-240, and bordering on Germantown, Tennessee, Memphis' current eastern limit.

=== Civil Rights Movement ===
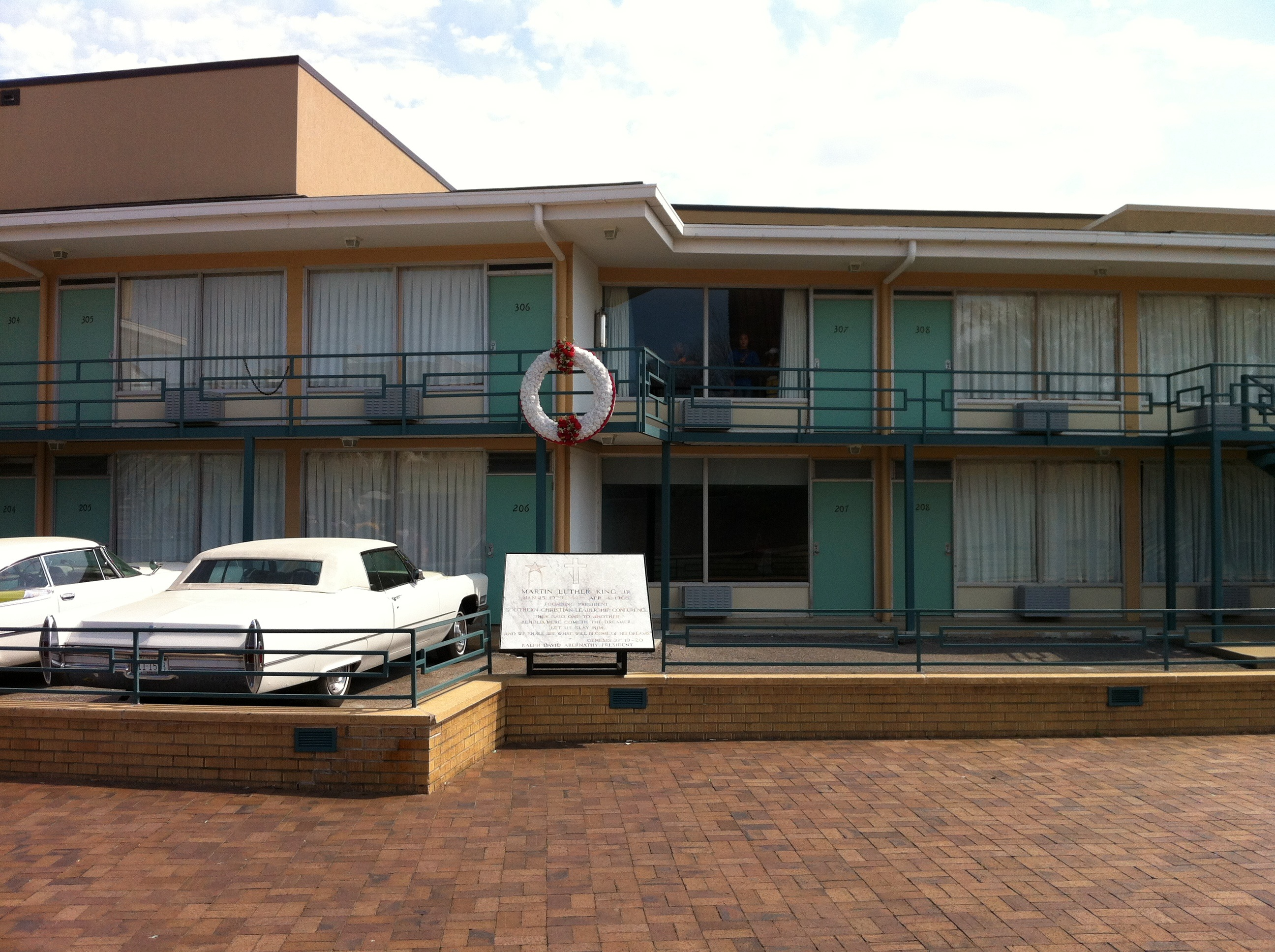
Lorraine Motel, site of the National Civil Rights Museum in Memphis (2012)

During the 1960s, the city was a center of activity during the Civil Rights Movement, as its large African-American population had been affected by state segregation practices and disenfranchisement in the early 20th century. African-American residents drew from the civil rights movement to improve their lives. In 1968, the Memphis sanitation strike began for living wages and better working conditions; the workers were overwhelmingly African American. They marched to gain public awareness and support for their plight: the danger of their work, and the struggles to support families with their low pay. Their drive for better pay had been met with resistance by the city government. Rev. Martin Luther King Jr. of the Southern Christian Leadership Conference, known for his leadership in the non-violent movement, came to lend his support to the workers' cause. He stayed at the Lorraine Motel in the city, where he was assassinated by a sniper on April 4, 1968, the day after giving his prophetic "I've Been to the Mountaintop" speech at the Mason Temple.

Grief-stricken and enraged after learning of King's murder, some in the city rioted, looting and destroying businesses and other facilities, some by arson. The governor ordered Tennessee National Guardsmen into the city within hours, where small, roving bands of rioters continued to be active. Fearing the violence, more of the middle-class began to leave the city for the suburbs.

=== Recent history ===
The entertainer and philanthropist Danny Thomas helped open St. Jude Children's Research Hospital in downtown Memphis in 1962. St. Jude specializes in the study and treatment of catastrophic diseases affecting children, especially leukemia and other childhood cancers, AIDS, sickle cell disease, and inherited immune disorders. Its success rates and free treatment for its patients have made it one of the most reputable children's hospitals in the world.

FedEx Corporation (originally, Federal Express) was founded in Little Rock, Arkansas in 1971, but moved its operations to Memphis in 1973 to take advantage of its more extensive airport facilities. As Memphis developed as the major hub of operations for FedEx, the Memphis International Airport became the largest airfreight terminal in the world.

In 1974 Harold Ford Sr. of Memphis was elected to Congress, becoming the first black elected national official from Tennessee; he was re-elected for several terms. He was one of several Ford brothers who became active in politics in Memphis, Shelby County and the state; his son Harold Ford Jr. also became a Congressman. In 1991 the city of Memphis elected its first African-American mayor, Dr. W.W. Herenton.

On December 23, 1988, a tanker truck hauling liquefied propane crashed at the I-40/I-240 interchange in Midtown and exploded, starting multiple vehicle and structural fires. The tank was the propelled 125 yards (114 m) from the crash site into a nearby duplex apartment. Nine people were killed and ten were injured. It was one of the deadliest motor vehicle accidents in state history and eventually led to the reconstruction of the interchange where it occurred.

== 21st century ==
=== Federal intervention ===
On September 12, 2025, President Donald Trump announced the deployment of National Guardsmen to Memphis, Tennessee, saying that "Memphis is deeply troubled." On September 15, 2025, Trump signed a presidential memorandum ordering the deployment of federal law enforcement as part of a task force with Tennessee's National Guard. On October 1, 2025, the presence of federal law enforcement increased in Memphis. U.S. Attorney General Pam Bondi, Secretary of Defense Pete Hegseth, and White House Deputy Chief of Staff Stephen Miller visited Memphis. They addressed law enforcement officers from various agencies, declaring it was a long-term operation. Miller said, "We are going to bulldoze the criminal elements in this city, and therefore liberate the law-abiding citizens." Pam Bondi said in a social media post that the Memphis Safe Task Force had made more than 50 arrests over two days. Tennessee Governor Bill Lee indicated that he believed that any deployment of National Guard troops would include no more than 150 unarmed personnel.

== Cultural history ==
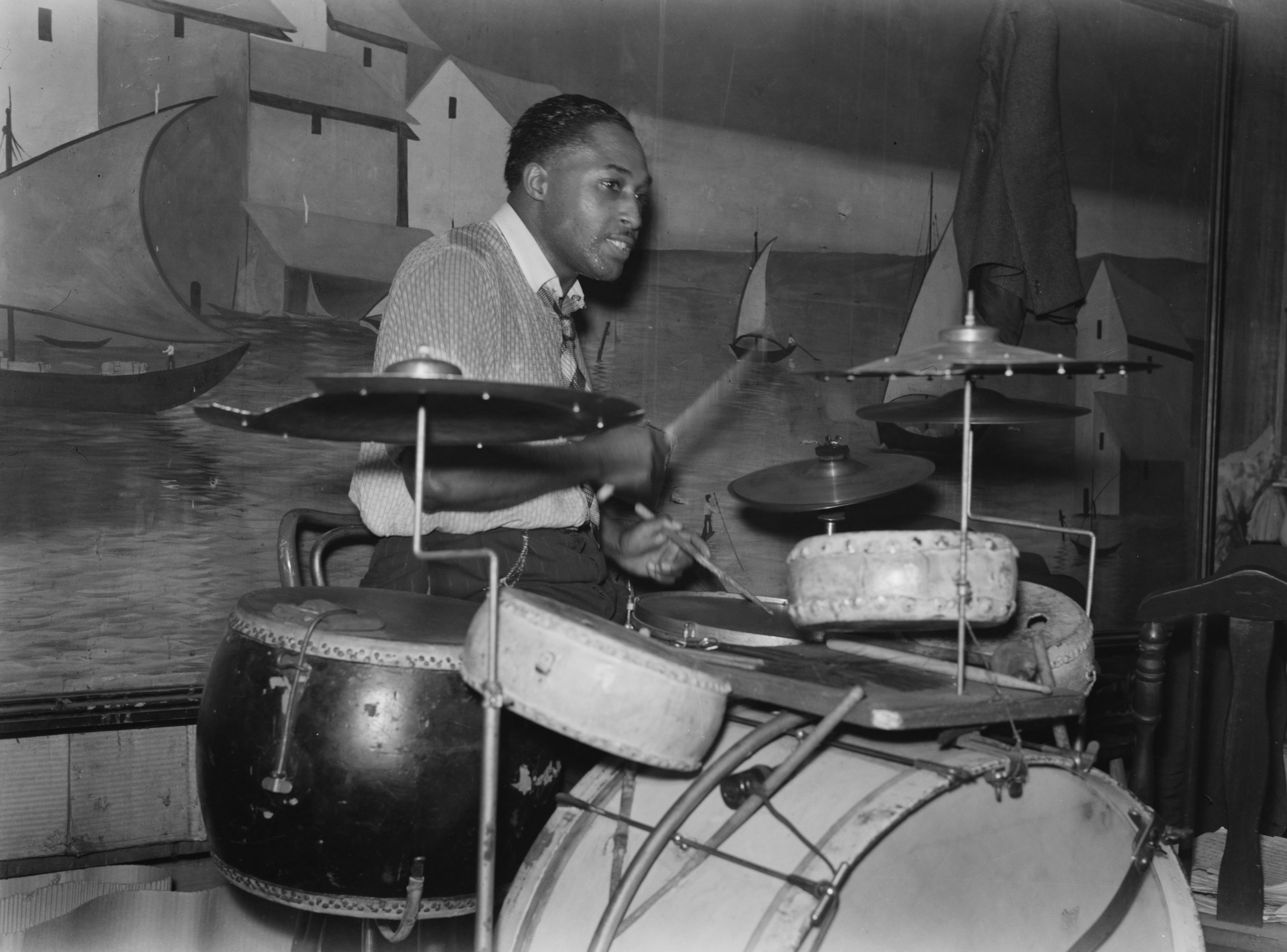
Jazz musician, Memphis (1939)

Memphis is well known for its cultural contributions to the identity of the American south.

Col. Henry Van Pelt began publishing The Appeal newspaper, ancestor of today's Commercial Appeal, in a wooden shack along the Wolf River in 1841. A pro-Confederacy newspaper, The Appeal moved frequently during the Civil War to avoid capture by Union forces. The Commercial Appeal was awarded a Pulitzer Prize in 1923 for its coverage of, and editorial opposition to, the activities of the Ku Klux Klan, which was at a peak in urban areas following the Klan's revival in 1915.

=== Riverboats ===
From the earliest days of the steamboat, through the present day, Memphis has been a major center of river transportation. Passenger steamers linked Memphis with river ports up and down the Mississippi, Ohio and Missouri Rivers as late as the 1920s. Tom Lee Park on the Memphis riverfront is named for an African-American riverworker who became a civic hero. Tom Lee could not swim. But, he single-handedly rescued thirty-two people from drowning when the steamer M.E. Norman sank in 1925.

=== African-American music ===
Beginning in the early 20th century, Memphis became famous for its innovative strains of African-American music, including gospel, blues, jazz, soul, and Rhythm and Blues genres, a tradition that continues to this day. Many notable blues musicians grew up in and around the Memphis and northern Mississippi, and performed there regularly. These included such musical greats as Muddy Waters, Robert Johnson, B.B. King, and Howlin' Wolf.

Stax Records, which opened in Memphis in 1957, produced almost exclusively African-American music. Stax was a major factor in the creation of the Southern soul and Memphis soul music styles, also releasing gospel, funk, jazz, and blues recordings. Stax recordings and artists included Rufus and Carla Thomas, Sam and Dave, Otis Redding, William Bell, The Bar-Kays and their house band, Booker T. & the MG's. Several Stax hits were written and produced by the team of Isaac Hayes and David Porter.

=== Rock and Roll ===
In 1950, Sam Phillips opened the "Memphis Recording Service", where he recorded for his Sun Records label. B.B. King, Howlin' Wolf, Elvis Presley, Johnny Cash, Jerry Lee Lewis, Carl Perkins, and Roy Orbison were all recorded there in its early years. The young Elvis Presley frequently listened to gospel and soul music, and many of his early recordings were inspired or written by African-American composers and recording artists in the Mid-South area.

=== Firsts in radio ===
The first African American-formatted radio station, WDIA, was founded in the city in 1947 by Bert Ferguson and John Pepper. A young B. B. King worked there as a disc jockey. B. B. King's moniker was derived from his WDIA nickname, "Beale Street Blues Boy", a reference to Memphis' Beale Street on which many nightclubs and blues venues were located. WHER, the first all-female station ("All-Girl Radio"), was founded in 1955 by the recording studio owner Sam Phillips and Holiday Inn founder Kemmons Wilson.

=== Culinary history ===
In addition to a rich musical heritage, Memphis also boasts a long culinary legacy dominated by regional barbecue. Memphis barbecue is rendered distinct by its sole usage of pork (as opposed to beef), focus on rib and shoulder cuts of meat, and multiple locally owned barbecue restaurants.

=== Historically significant districts ===
Historical population
Year	Pop.	±%
1840	3,360	—
1850	8,841	+163.1%
1860	22,623	+155.9%
1870	40,226	+77.8%
1880	33,592	−16.5%
1890	64,495	+92.0%
1900	102,320	+58.6%
1910	131,105	+28.1%
1920	162,351	+23.8%
1930	253,143	+55.9%
1940	292,942	+15.7%
1950	396,000	+35.2%
1960	497,524	+25.6%
1970	623,988	+25.4%
1980	646,174	+3.6%
1990	610,337	−5.5%
2000	650,100	+6.5%
2010	646,889	−0.5%
2020	633,104	−2.1%
Source: "U.S. Census website". United States Census Bureau.

Downtown Memphis is the oldest section of the city, built on a bluff overlooking the Mississippi River. Downtown includes the old central business and government districts. Beale Street and the Lorraine Motel (now preserved and operating as the National Civil Rights Museum, where Martin Luther King Jr. was assassinated on April 4, 1968) are located in the Downtown area.

The Pinch District or just The Pinch is an area of Uptown, Memphis that played an important role in local immigration patterns beginning in the early 19th century. Memphis' first business district, the Pinch encompassed all of Memphis north of Adams Street, from the River to Third Street. The name was originally a term of derision, referring to emaciated Irish immigrants who fled the Great Famine. Later, Italian, Russian, Greek and, especially, Jewish immigrants also called it home before migrating to more affluent sections of the city.

Victorian Village is a series of grand Victorian-era mansions built just east of Downtown Memphis in what was then the outskirts of the city. Several of these homes have been opened to the public for tours.

Orange Mound was the first African-American neighborhood in the United States to be built by and for African Americans. Orange Mound was developed on the grounds of a former plantation beginning in the 1890s; it provided affordable land and residences for the less affluent. The neighborhood provided a refuge for blacks moving to the city for the first time from the rural South. Orange Mound residents largely owned their own homes and enjoyed a strong sense of community and identity.

Midtown, Memphis, a very diverse area in the center of the city, has buildings largely dating from the first half of the 20th century. Midtown is Memphis' most ethnically and culturally diverse area. Many educational and cultural institutions are located in Midtown, including the University of Tennessee Health Science Center, Rhodes College, the Memphis Brooks Museum of Art, the Memphis Zoo, and the Memphis College of Art. Evergreen Historic District, one of Memphis' oldest residential districts, is located in Midtown. Tennessee Williams wrote his first produced play, Cairo, Shanghai, Bombay! at the Midtown home of his grandparents in 1935. It was performed by a Midtown Memphis amateur theater group that year.

== Education ==
The first Memphis schools were chartered in 1826, but until 1848 all Memphis schools were private. During this time the Memphis City Schools was formed in the early 1830s. The first "free" public schools opened in 1848, but at first nominally charged a $2 tuition. By 1852, there were 13 public schools supported by taxpayers.

The first city school for black students opened in 1868 during Reconstruction, when the biracial state legislature founded public education. For a century the city maintained separate, racially segregated school facilities. Memphis City Schools began desegregation in the late 1950s, but progress was slow. A federal court order in 1973 required the city to provide busing to fully integrate the schools. This order was so unpopular with white families that within four years, 40,000 white students were pulled out of the public system, which effect many white families to move out of the city. Within a short time other white families enrolled their children in private schools, some founded at this time as "segregation academies".

The University of Tennessee College of Dentistry was founded in 1878, making it the oldest dental college in the South, and the third-oldest public college of dentistry in the United States. The University of Tennessee College of Medicine in Memphis was created in 1911 through the merger of five independent Tennessee medical schools following the influential Flexner Report.

The University of Memphis first opened as the West Tennessee State Normal School in 1912. Christian Brothers University was founded in 1871, first on Adams Street downtown before moving to its current location on East Parkway. Rhodes College, then known as Southwestern at Memphis, moved to Memphis from Clarksville, Tennessee in 1925. LeMoyne-Owen College a private, historically black, church-affiliated college traces its history to 1862 when the American Missionary Association (AMA) opened an elementary school for freedmen and escaped slaves.

== Historical and genealogical resources ==
The Memphis and Shelby County Room in the Benjamin L. Hooks Central Library provides facilities for researchers to view items from the library's archives and its manuscript collections. These include historical records of people and families, maps, photographs, newspaper vertical files, books, city directories, and music and video recordings. These materials document the development of the community, government, economy, culture, and heritage of Memphis and Shelby County, Tennessee. The Genealogy Collection includes microfilmed and indexed Memphis and Shelby County records. The Tennessee Genealogical Society maintains a Regional History and Genealogy Center Library in suburban Germantown, TN. The Shelby County Register of Deeds website has many important records available on-line, including real estate transactions, court cases and vital records.

== Gallery ==
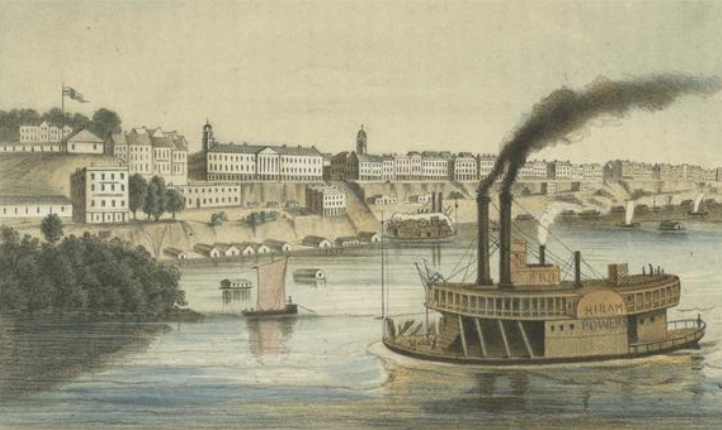
Memphis, Tennessee, between 1854 and 1857, The New York Public Library, Digital Collection.

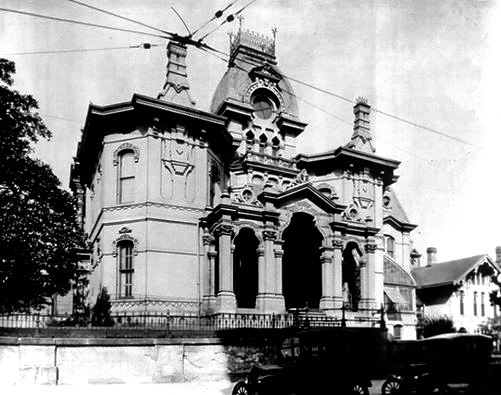
Former Napoleon Hill mansion (1881–1930).

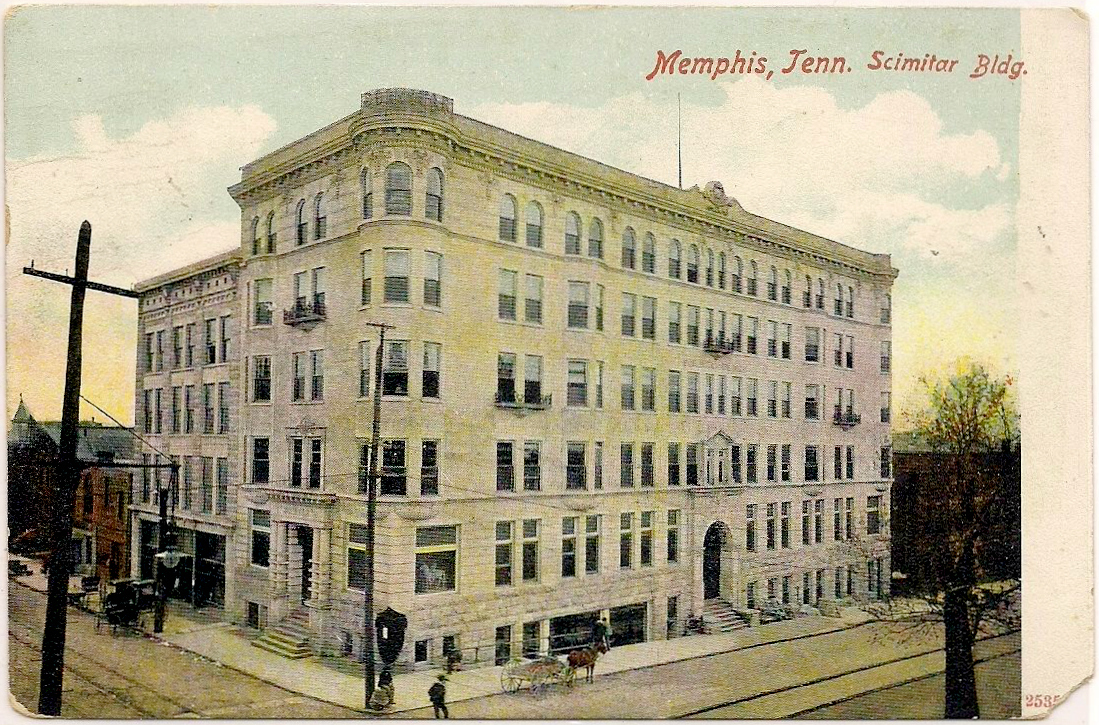
Scimitar Building, commissioned by Napoleon Hill in 1902.

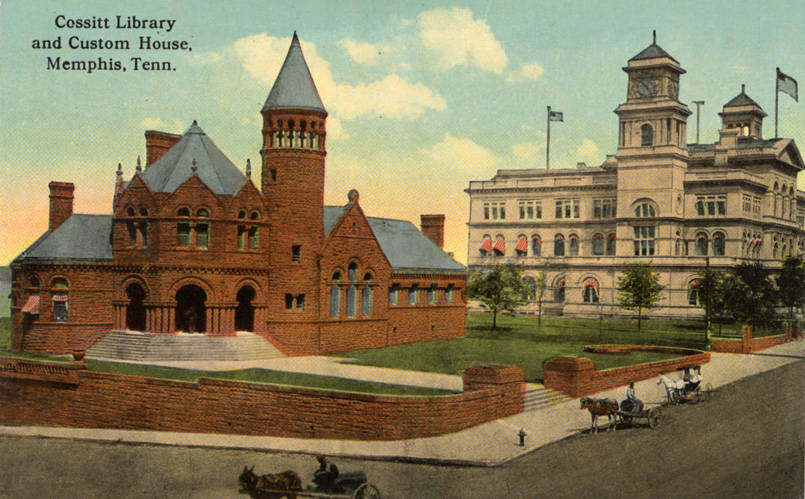
Cossitt Library and US Customs House (NBY 6202) c. 1910/1919.

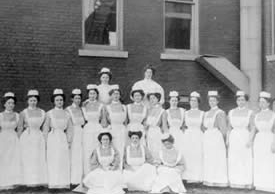
Memphis Training School for Nurses was chartered September 28, 1887.

Cotton broker's office, November, 1939.

== See also ==
- 1978 Memphis fire and police strikes
- Timeline of Memphis, Tennessee

== Bibliography ==
- Biles, Roger (1986). Memphis: In the Great Depression. Knoxville, TN: University of Tennessee Press. ISBN 978-0870494970. scholarly study
- Biles, Roger (1984). "Ed Crump Versus the Unions: The Labor Movement in Memphis during the 1930s". Labor History. 25 (4): 533–552. doi:10.1080/00236568408584775.
