= Gayoso-Peabody Historic District =

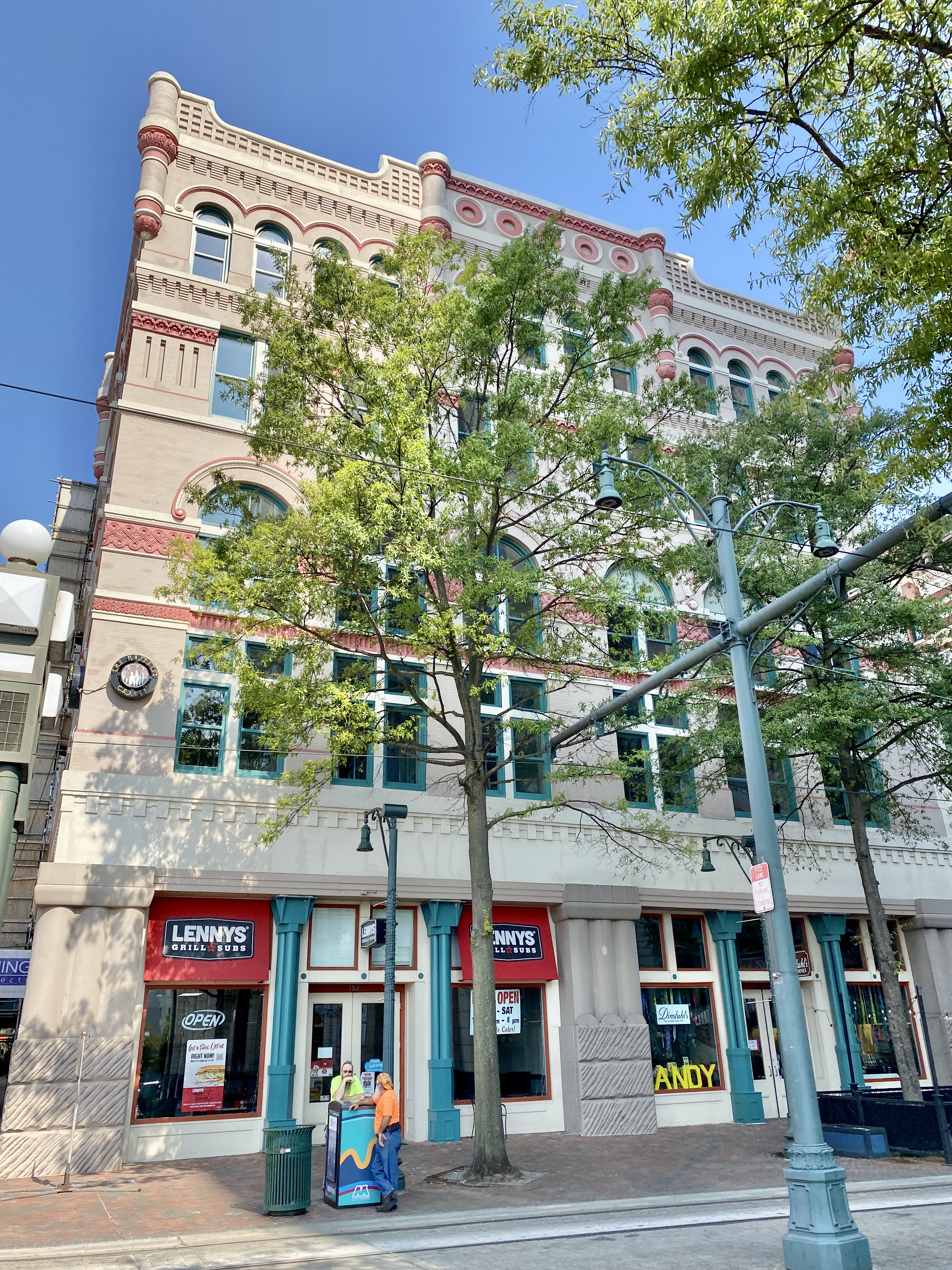
Riley Building at 50 Peabody Place

Gayoso-Peabody Historic District is in Memphis, Tennessee. Buildings in the district date from the 1880s to 1927.

Hotels, saloons, restaurants, dry goods, hardware, brothels, and wholesale grocers served the "Cotton Row" cotton factor businesses. Hotels included the Gayoso Hotel and Peabody Hotel. There were also theaters. Various architectural style are represented.

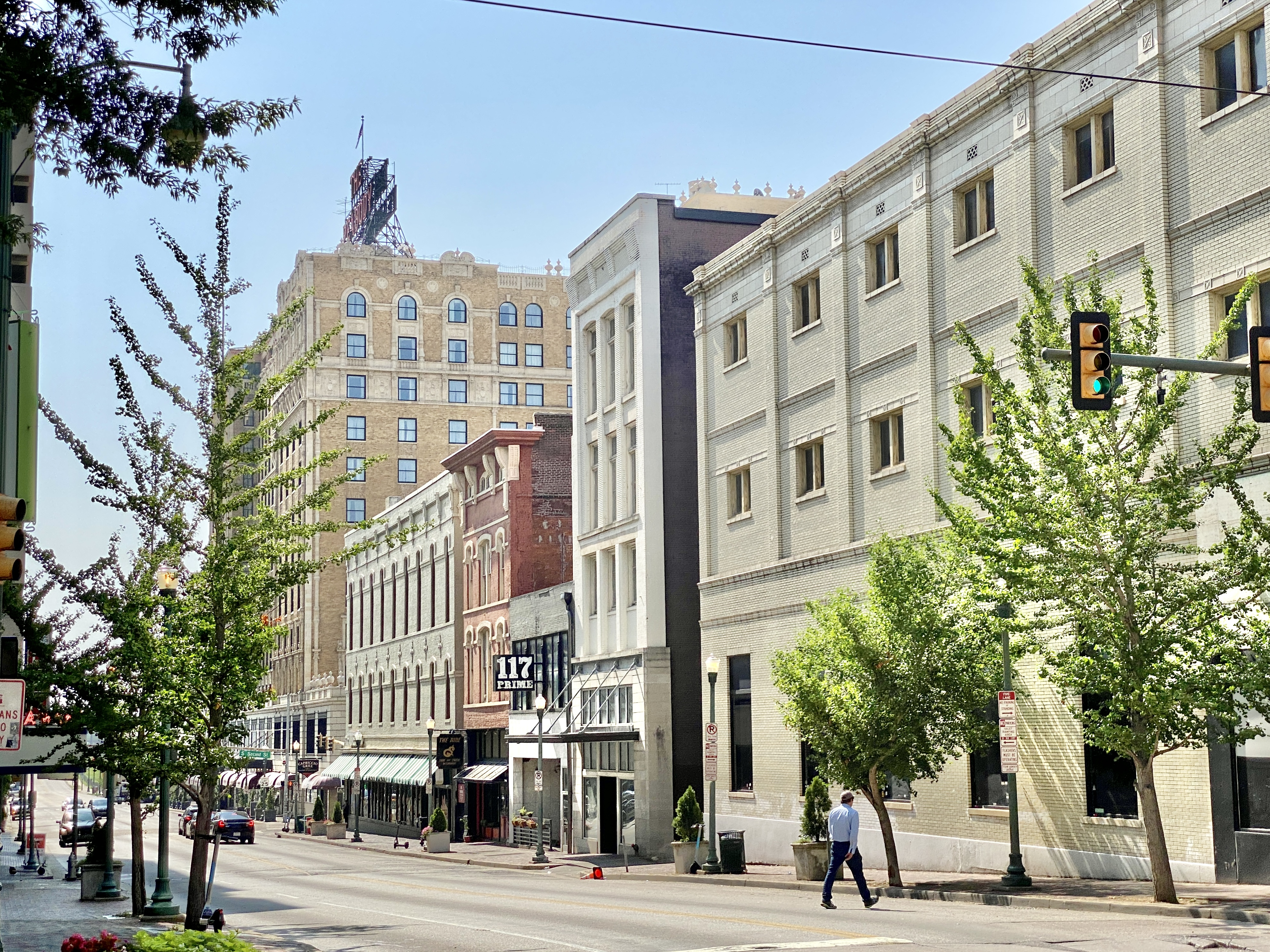
Union Avenue

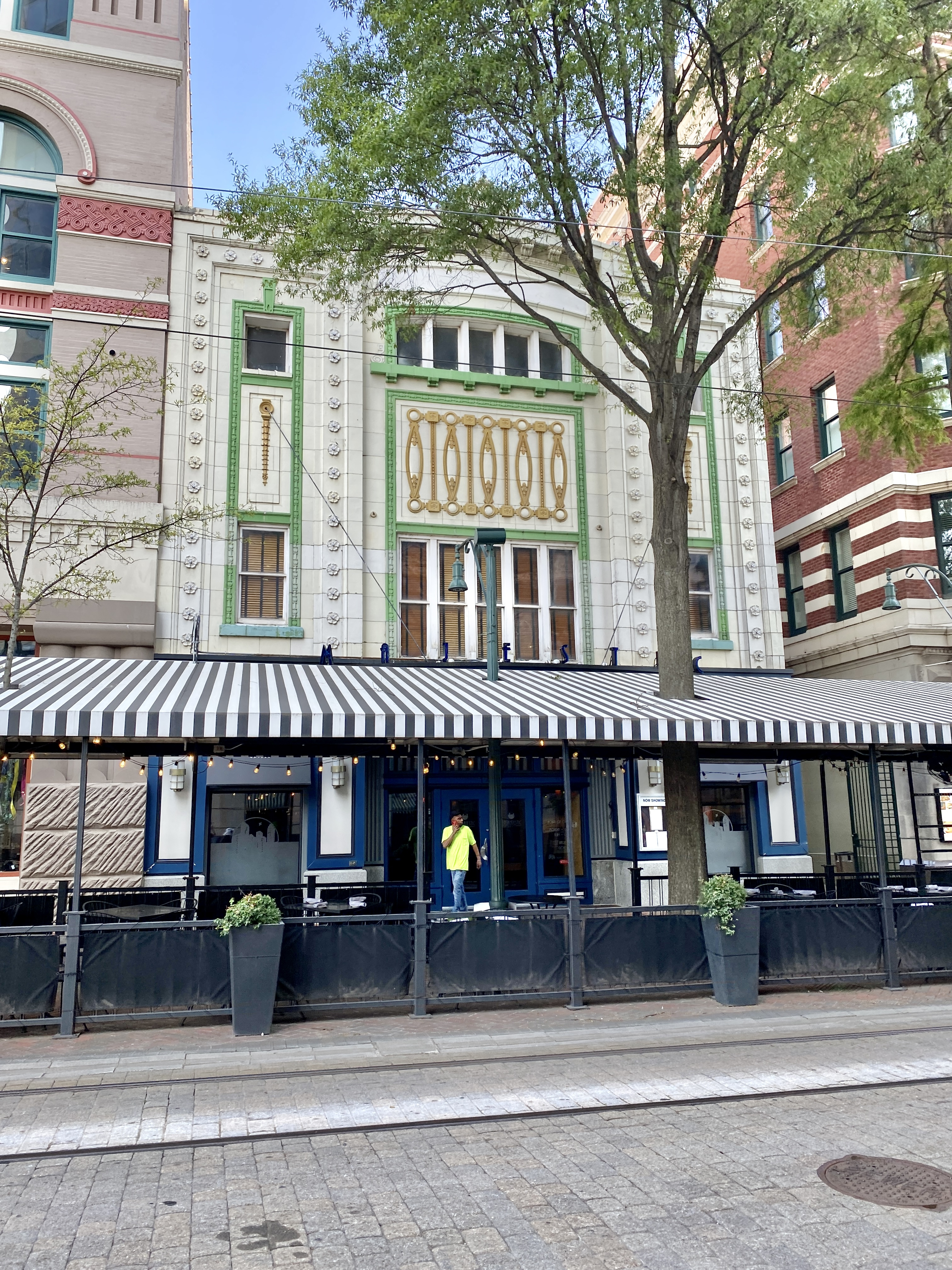
Former Majestic Theatre No. 1 Building

Portions of Main Street, Monroe, Union Acenue, Gayoso Avenue, Peabody Place (formerly McCall Place), Barboro Alley, Second Street, Third Street (now B.B. King Boulevard), Front Street, and Hernando Streets are in the historic district. It is listed on the National Register of Historic Places. Its bounderies were expended in 2006.

== See also ==
- History of Memphis, Tennessee
- National Register of Historic Places listings in Shelby County, Tennessee
