= Berclair =

Berclair may refer to:

- Berclair, Memphis, a district of Memphis, Tennessee, United States
- Berclair, Mississippi, an unincorporated community in the United States
- Berclair, Texas, an unincorporated community in the United States
