= Joe Hill Louis =

American singer, guitarist, harmonica player and one-man band

- Louis c. 1950

Background information
- Also known as: The Be-Bop Boy; The Pepticon Boy; Chicago Sunny Boy
- Born: Lester Hill; September 23, 1921; Raines, Tennessee, U.S.
- Died: August 5, 1957 (aged 35) Memphis, Tennessee, U.S.
- Genres: Blues
- Occupation: Musician
- Instruments: Guitar; vocals; harmonica; drums
- Years active: 1940s–1957
- Labels: Phillips; Sun; Checker; Modern; Meteor; Columbia

Lester Hill (September 23, 1921 – August 5, 1957), known professionally as Joe Hill Louis, was an American singer, guitarist, harmonica player and one-man band. He was one of a small number of one-man blues bands (along with fellow Memphis bluesman Doctor Ross) to have recorded commercially in the 1950s. He was also a session musician for Sun Records.

== Life and career ==
=== Early life ===
Louis was born Lester (or possibly Leslie) Hill on September 23, 1921, in Raines, Tennessee, now part of Memphis. His nickname "Joe Louis" arose as a result of a childhood fight with another youth. At the age of 14 he left home to work as a servant for a wealthy Memphis family. He also worked at the Peabody Hotel in Memphis in the late 1930s. From the early 1940s onwards he worked as a musician and one-man band.

=== Recording and radio career ===
Louis made his recording debut on Columbia Records in 1949, and his music was released on a variety of labels through the 1950s, such as Modern, Checker, Meteor, Big Town, and Mimosa. Louis also recorded for Sam Phillips' Sun Records, both under his own name and as a backing musician for a wide variety of other singers.

Joe Hill Louis, "Boogie in the Park" (1950)
"Boogie in the Park" (1950), featuring Louis playing an electric guitar and a drum kit at the same time

His most notable electric blues single, "Gotta Let You Go" b/w "Boogie in the Park" (recorded in July 1950 and released the following month as part number 9001/9002), featured Louis performing "one of the loudest, most overdriven, and distorted guitar stomps ever recorded" while also playing a rudimentary drum kit. It was the only record released on Sam Phillips's early 'It's The Phillips' label before he founded Sun Records. Louis's electric guitar playing is also considered a predecessor of heavy metal music.

Another notable recording he made at Sun Records was as guitarist on Rufus Thomas's "Bear Cat", an answer record to Big Mama Thornton's "Hound Dog", which reached number 3 on the R&B chart and resulted in legal action for copyright infringement. He also shared writing credit for the song "Tiger Man", which has been recorded by Thomas and Elvis Presley, among others. Around 1950 he took over the Pepticon Boy radio program on WDIA from B. B. King. He was also known as "The Pepticon Boy" or "The Be-Bop Boy", and recorded as "Chicago Sunny Boy" for Meteor Records in 1953.

== Death ==
Louis died on August 5, 1957, in John Gaston Hospital, in Memphis, at the age of 35, of tetanus contracted as a result of an infected cut on his thumb, sustained while he was working as an odd job man.

== Selected discography ==
- Boogie in the Park (Ace CDCHD-803, 2001)
- King of the One Man Bands (Key Postwar Cuts 1949–1954) (JSP 4208, 2008) 2-CD
- A' Jumpin' & A' Shufflin' The Blues 1950–1954 (Jasmine JASMCD-3143, 2019)

== Bibliography ==
- Harris, S. (1989). Blues Who's Who, 5th paperback edition. New York: Da Capo Press.
- Turner, B. (1985). "The Blues in Memphis". Album booklet for Sun Records: The Blues Years 1950–1956. London: Sun Records.
