= Burkle Estate =

Historic house museum in Memphis, Tennessee

Coordinates: 35°09′57″N 90°02′36″W

The Burkle Estate
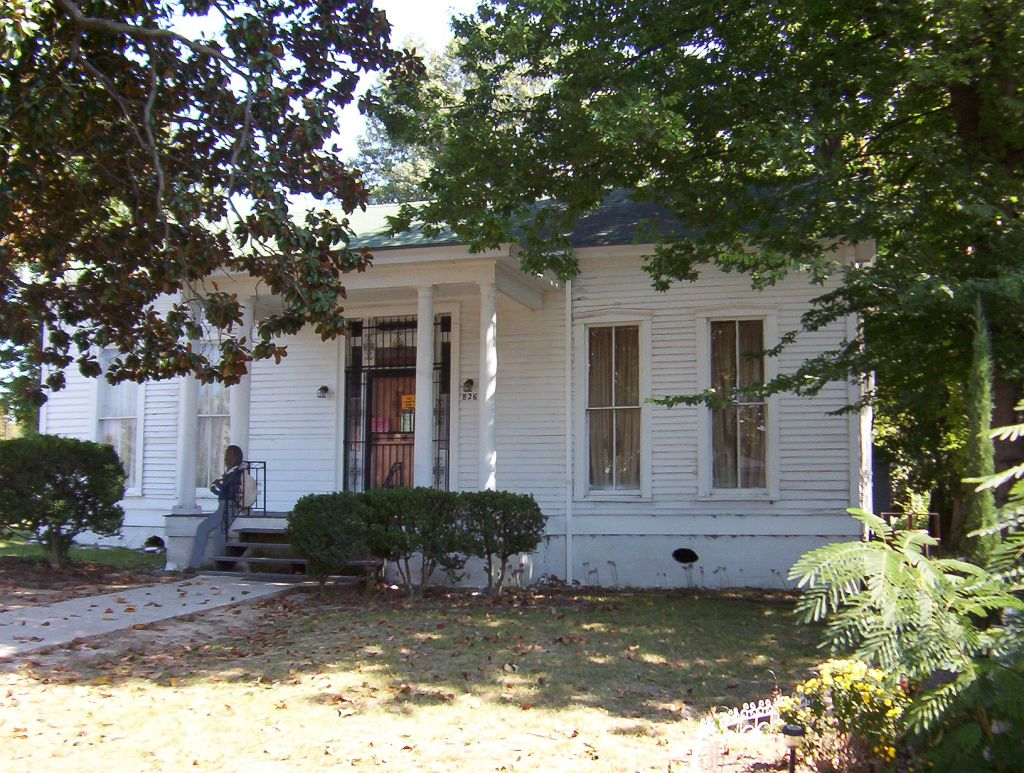
- Established: 1997, built in 1849
- Location: 826 N Second St, Memphis, TN
- Public transit access: MATA

The Burkle Estate is a historic home at 826 North Second Street in Memphis, Tennessee. It is also known as the Slavehaven. Although disputed by some historians, the Burkle Estate is claimed to have been part of the Underground Railroad – a secret network of way stations to help slaves escape to freedom in the northern states. The house was constructed in 1849 by a German immigrant by the name of Jacob Burkle.

Since 1997 the estate is home to the Slave Haven Underground Railroad Museum.

== Underground Railroad ==
It is understood by some that The Burkle Estate may have served as a way station on the Underground Railroad for runaway slaves. Publicly, Mr. Burkle was a livestock trader and a baker. Privately, some state that he was a conductor on the Underground Railroad. Many believe his home was the last stop in a series of Memphis homes connected by tunnels. The house included a small cellar which might have been used to hide escaping slaves. Slaves could then get on boats to take them upriver to other way stations in the free states north of the Ohio River.

== Controversy ==
The role of the home as a part of the Underground Railroad is subject to debate. There is a significant lack of physical, primary evidence suggesting that the Burkle Estate was a part of the Underground Railroad.

In response to the claim that there is not enough evidence to suggest that the Burkle Estate was in fact a part of the Underground Railroad, Historians from Memphis' public library system proposed a counterargument. The historians suggest that the lack of primary, physical evidence of the Burkle Estate further validates the presumption that the Burkle Estate was a part of the Underground Railroad. This is because keeping physical evidence of the Underground Railroad would have been dangerous for the Burkle family as it would have revealed their role in the Underground Railroad. A trapdoor, and a hidden staircase inside the Burkle Estate house, which are rather abnormal characteristics of a home, also are used to suggest that the Burkle Estate played a role in the Underground Railroad.

== Slavehaven Museum ==
The house opened as a museum in 1997 and tours of the one-story, white clapboard house are available. The house is decorated with 19th-century furnishings and artifacts and served as part of the overall civil rights heritage of Memphis. The museum documents the history of the Underground Railroad and the possible role of the house in that secret escape network. Slavery, slave trade, slave auctions and the everyday life of slaves in the wider Memphis area are also documented in the museum.

== See also ==
- List of Underground Railroad sites
- List of museums in Tennessee
- History of Memphis, Tennessee
