= Raines, Memphis =

Coordinates: 35°02′05″N 90°03′07″W

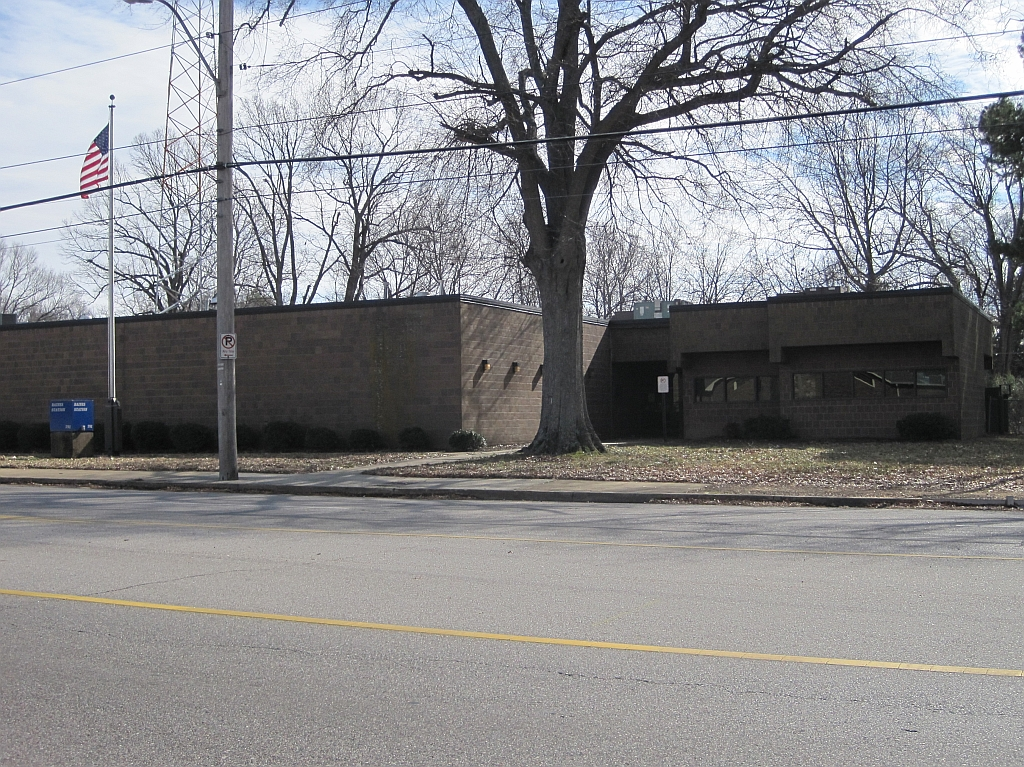
Raines Police Station on Raines Road

Raines was a suburb on the southern boundary of Memphis, Tennessee. It was located between West Junction, Oakville, and on the north of Whitehaven. In 1950 it had a population of 300.

At some point in 1958, it was incorporated into the City of Memphis.

One-man-band Joe Hill Louis was born here.

== Sources ==
- Encyclopædia Britannica Atlans, 1958 Edition, Plate 111.
- Shelby County Commission Map, 1927 http://hdl.handle.net/10267/31153
