= Nonconnah, Tennessee =

Coordinates: 35°03′43″N 90°02′10″W

Nonconnah, Tennessee was a populated place along Nonconnah Creek in what is now Memphis.

Nonconnah was located just to the east of West Junction, Tennessee.

== Sources ==
- Google maps map for Nonconnah
- 2009 Rand McNally Road Atlas, p. 94
- Encyclopædia Britannica Atlas, 1958 Edition, Plate 111.
