= M.E. Norman =

Coordinates: 35.020°N 90.250°W

- Memorial in Tom Lee Park in Memphis, Tennessee, commemorating the heroic rescue of 32 lives. (2008)

History

United States
- Name: M.E. Norman
- Launched: 1924
- Fate: Sank, May 8, 1925

General characteristics
- Type: Steamboat
- Length: 113 ft (34 m)
- Beam: 26 ft (7.9 m)
- Capacity: 65 passengers
- Complement: 10

M.E. Norman was a sternwheel steamboat operated by the U.S. Army Corps of Engineers. On May 8, 1925, M.E. Norman sank after capsizing in the Mississippi River. Tom Lee, an African American riverworker, saved the lives of 32 passengers.

== Description ==
M.E. Norman was a sternwheel steamboat, meaning it was steam-powered with a paddlewheel located at the rear (stern) of the ship. It was built in Morgan City, Louisiana in 1924, measured 113 ft (34 m) long by 26 ft (7.9 m) wide, and carried a maximum of 65 passengers and 10 crew members. The ship was operated by the U.S. Army Corps of Engineers.

== Sinking ==
On May 8, 1925, M.E. Norman was one of two ships used to provide a sightseeing tour for attendees and families of the Mid-South convention of the American Society of Civil Engineers in Memphis, Tennessee. As the ship approached Cow Island Bend in the Mississippi River, it began listing to both sides, then capsized and sank rapidly.

Tom Lee, a 39-year-old African American riverworker, was returning to shore in a 28-foot motorboat, Zev, when he became the only witness to the sinking. Lee, who could not swim, acted with little regard for his own safety, using the small motorboat to rescue 32 passengers from the river. He made several trips, continuing the search throughout the night. Twenty other survivors were able to swim to safety on their own.

Overall, 23 passengers and crew drowned. Most of the bodies were recovered during the spring and summer of 1925. The final body was recovered in February 1926, and three bodies were never recovered. The wreck of M.E. Norman was located a few days after the sinking, but attempts to raise it failed.

The cause of the sinking was investigated but no clear explanation was ever determined.

== Discovery of artifacts ==
In 1998, Mobley contractors crews demolishing an old bridge near Ensley Engineer Yard unearthed a time capsule of M.E. Norman artifacts. The time capsule had been buried in May 1936 and apparently forgotten. The artifacts included an Army Corps of Engineers flag from the ship, newspaper articles documenting its sinking, passenger lists, and related photos and letters. The artifacts were preserved and exhibited as "Time In A Capsule" later that year.

== Tom Lee Park ==
Tom Lee Park in Memphis, Tennessee is named in rescuer Tom Lee's honor. In October 2006, a bronze sculpture was erected in the park to commemorate the event and to honor the civil hero.
