= Oakville, Tennessee =

Former community in Tennessee, United States

Oakville
- Former community
- Location within Tennessee
- Coordinates: 35°03′54″N 89°56′27″W
- Country: United States
- State: Tennessee
- County: Shelby

Population (1950)
  - Total: 2,000
- Time zone: UTC−6 (CST)
  - Summer (DST): UTC−5 (CDT)

Oakville was a community in Tennessee located just east of the current site of the Memphis International Airport. It was centered along the Route of US 78 (Lamar Avenue) just a little northeast of the intersection with Getwell Road.

In 1950, it had a population of 2,000. In 1958, Nonconnah Creek just to the north of Oakville, came very close to being the southern boundary of Memphis. Oakville was located along the SLSF railway, about five miles northeast of the Capleville community.

Oakville has since been annexed by Memphis as part of that city's expansion.

== Sources ==
- Map showing site of Oakville
- Encyclopædia Britannica Atlas, 1958 Edition, p. 353, Plate 111.
- 2009 Rand McNally Road Atlas, p. 94.
