= Tom Lee Park =

City park in Memphis, Tennessee

- Tom Lee Memorial in Tom Lee Park. (2008)
- Interactive map of Tom Lee Park
- Type: Municipal
- Location: Memphis, Tennessee
- Coordinates: 35°08′11″N 90°03′46″W
- Area: 30 acres (12 ha)
- Operator: City of Memphis
- Status: Open all year from dawn to 10 pm
- Public transit: Riverfront Loop

Tom Lee Park is a city park located to the immediate west of downtown Memphis, Tennessee, overlooking the Mississippi River. Encompassing about 30 acres (12 ha) parallel to the Mississippi River for about one mile (1.6 km), it offers panoramic views of the Mississippi River and the shores of Arkansas on the opposite side. The park is named after Tom Lee, an African-American riverworker, who saved the lives of 32 passengers of the sinking steamboat M.E. Norman in 1925.

Tom Lee Park is a popular location for walkers, joggers, roller bladers and cyclists, and hosts one event per year, the Beale Street Music Festival that kicks off Memphis in May.

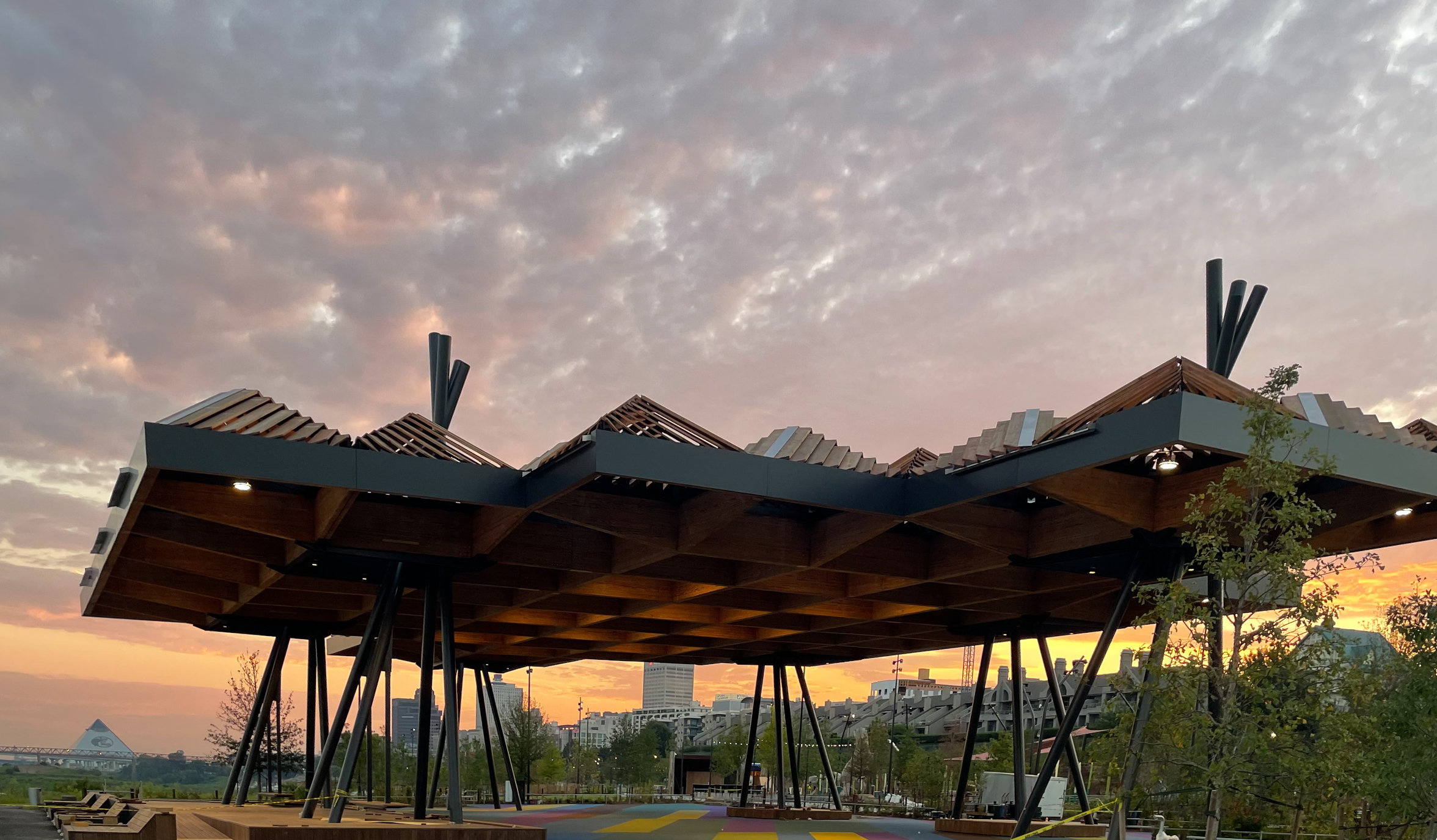
Tom Lee Park Civic Canopy, designed by Studio Gang.

In 2023, Tom Lee Park reopened following a substantial redesign by Studio Gang (as master planner and architect) and SCAPE (as landscape architect).

== Geography ==
Tom Lee Park is approximately one mile (1.6 km) long, but not more than 400 ft (120 m) wide at any point. It encompasses about 30 acres (12 ha), running south from Beale Street, bounded by the Mississippi River to the west, and Riverside Blvd to the east, offering panoramic views of the Mississippi River.

Luxury homes and condominiums line the top of the bluff overlooking the park and the river.

== Sinking of M.E. Norman ==
Tom Lee (ca. 1925)

The park is named after area resident Tom Lee (1885–1952).

Late during the afternoon of May 8, 1925, Lee steered his 28 ft (8.5 m) skiff Zev upriver after delivering an official to Helena, Arkansas.

Also on the river was the steamboat M.E. Norman, carrying members of the Engineers Club of Memphis, the American Society of Civil Engineers, and their families.

=== One man rescues 32 lives ===
Tom Lee witnessed M.E. Norman capsize in the swift current 15 mi (24 km) downriver from Memphis at Cow Island Bend. Although he could not swim, he rescued 32 people with five trips to shore. Lee acted quickly, calmly and with no regard for his own safety, continuing to search after night fell. Because of his efforts, only 23 people died.

=== Posthumous honors ===
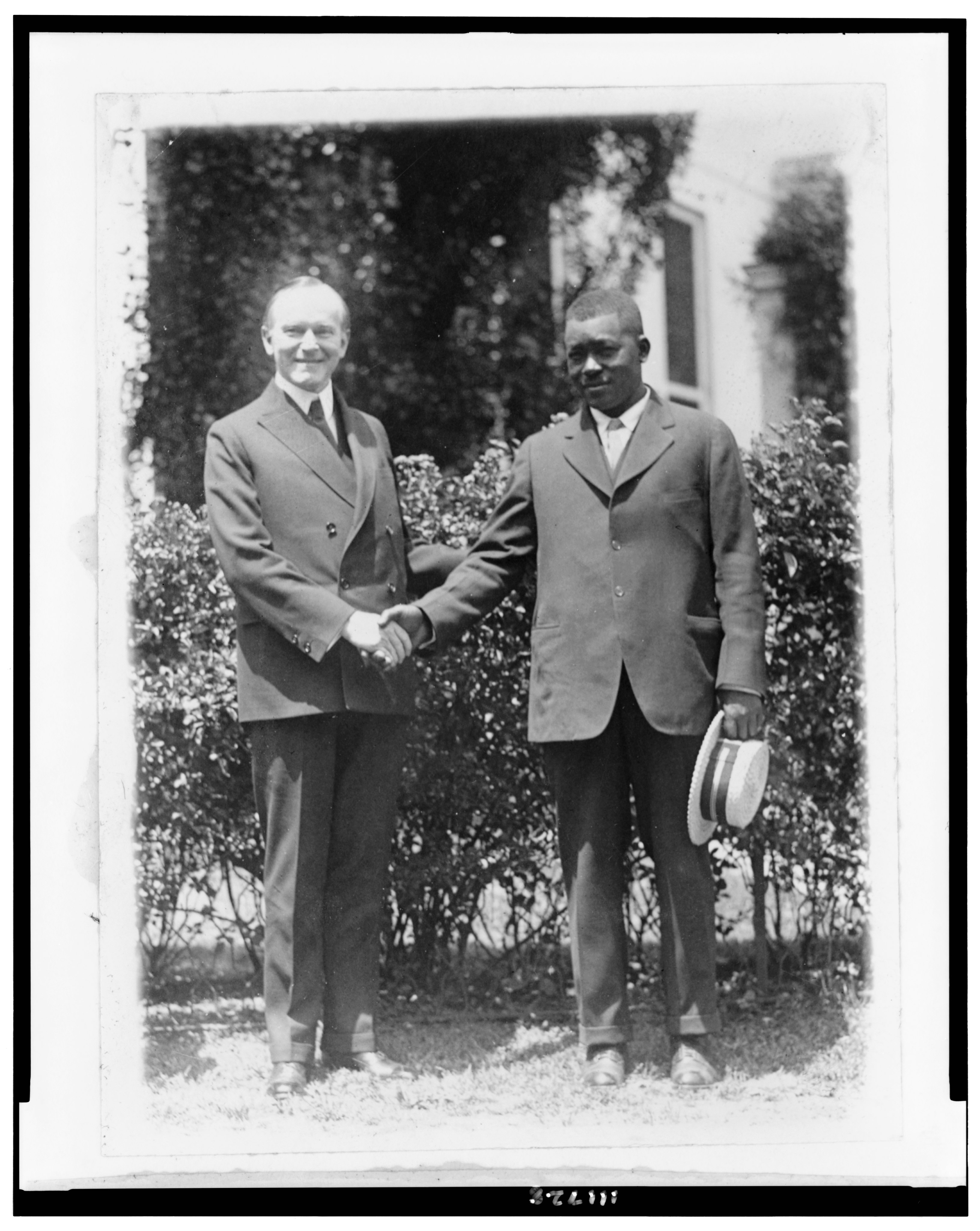
Tom Lee with President Calvin Coolidge in 1925.

To honor the hero, the Memphis Engineers Club raised enough money to purchase a house for Lee and his wife in Klondike, a neighborhood in North Memphis.

Tom Lee died of cancer on April 1, 1952 at John Gaston Hospital. Two years after his death, the park along the Memphis Riverfront was named in his honor and a granite obelisk was erected. The obelisk was destroyed once in 2003 in the aftermath of Hurricane Elvis and again during strong storms in May 2017.

In October 2006, a bronze sculpture by artist David Alan Clark was erected in the park to commemorate the event and to honor the civil hero. The sculpture depicts the rescue of a survivor saved from drowning in the Mississippi River.

== Events held in Tom Lee Park ==
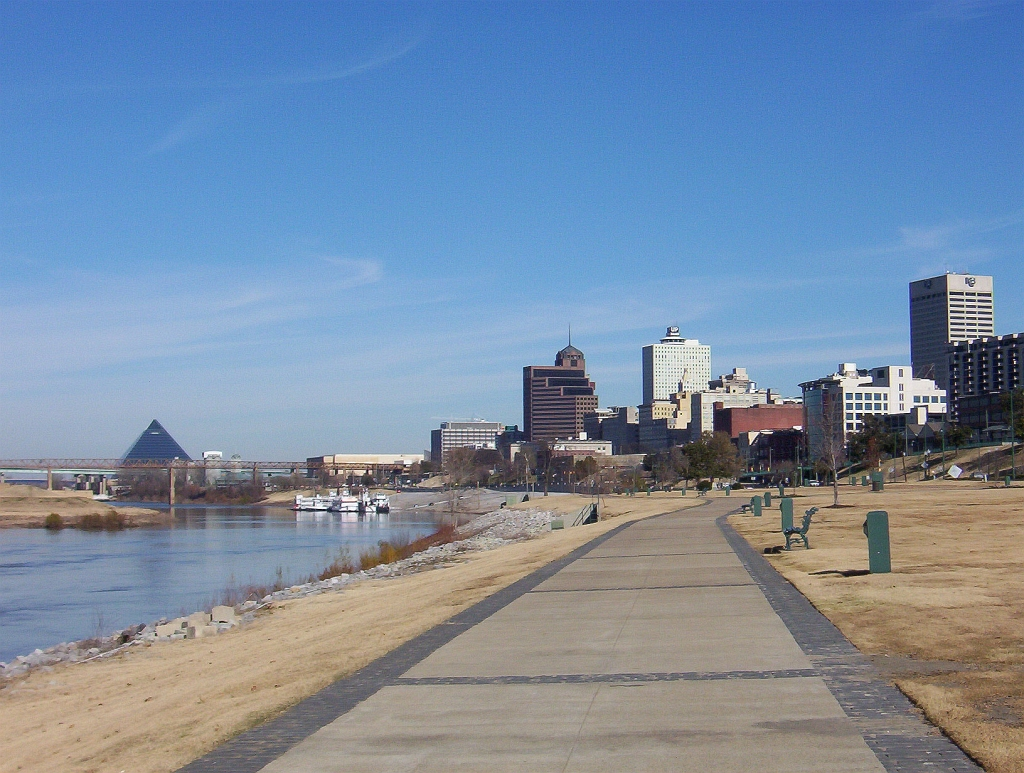
Memphis skyline seen from Tom Lee Park (2006)

Among several events held throughout the year, the park is well known throughout the city and region as the site of different outdoor events.

=== Music ===
The annual Memphis in May celebration is a high-profile event in the park.

The Beale Street Music Festival is a three-day event during the Memphis in May celebration, hosting over 60 musical acts each year on four stages, in diverse genres such as blues, hip-hop, and metal.

The Sunset Symphony concert, since discontinued, the largest annual performance event of the Memphis Symphony Orchestra, was a highlight in the park during Memorial Day weekend, marking the end of the Memphis in May celebration. It has been replaced with a "Celebrate Memphis" event marking the end of the monthlong affair.

=== Barbecue Cooking Contest ===
The World Championship Barbecue Cooking Contest, held the third weekend of May, is the world's largest pork barbecue cooking competition, attracting hundreds of competitors to Tom Lee Park from around the world.

== Revitalization ==
The concept for the revitalization of Tom Lee Park was first proposed by architecture and urban design firm Studio Gang in 2017. Developed with the Mayor’s Riverfront Task Force in partnership with Memphis River Parks Partnership, the Studio's master plan reimagined six miles of the city’s Mississippi riverfront as a connected network of spaces and opportunities that benefits the entire community and restores the natural ecology of the area.

The revitalized Tom Lee Park opened in September 2023. Designed by Studio Gang and SCAPE, the project transformed 30 acres of overlooked land along the river, formerly occupied by sparse green lawns and heavily compacted soil. The design restored native Tennessee plants, including over 1,000 new trees such as goldenrod and milkweed.

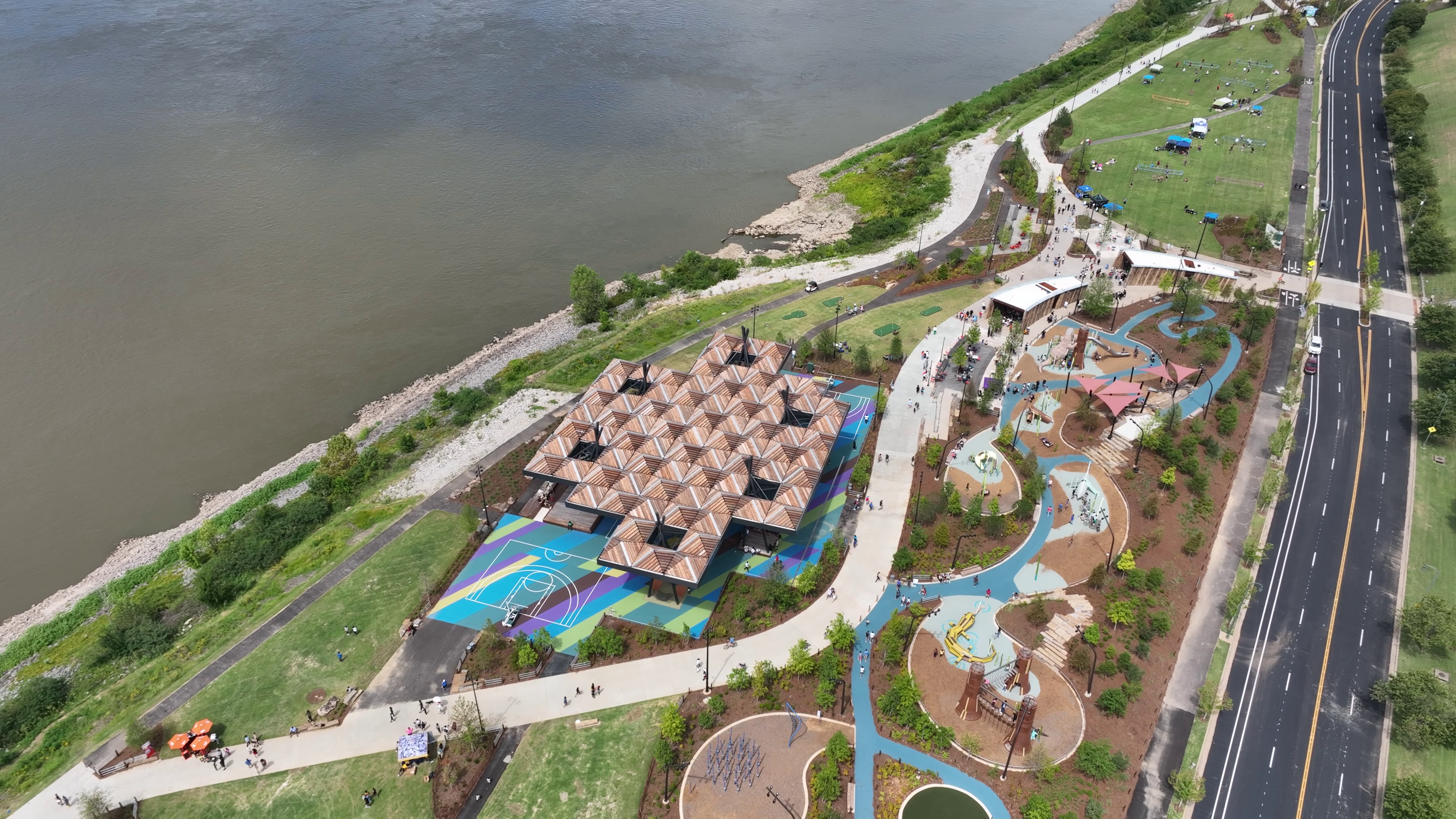
The Civic Canopy offers basketball courts as well as multipurpose space for community gatherings and other events.

Conceived to reconnect the city of Memphis to the Mississippi, the design features five new entrances that extend from major streets and connect to a series of winding paths that weave the park's primary zones together. The zones range from lively areas for recreation and flexible activities to more quiet, intimate areas for contemplation. Sculptural playgrounds designed by Monstrum take the form of giant creatures: a sturgeon, caterpillar, salamander, and a family of river otters. At the northern entrance, a switchback path leads down a series of bluffs to the river's edge, establishing the first fully accessible connection between Memphis and the river.

Among the park's new structures, a 1,486-square-metre canopy and event space, made of glulam and steel, protects and shades a set of multi-use courts, which are animated by a bright mural by Memphis-born artist James Little.

== See also ==
- M.E. Norman (steamboat)
- Memphis, Tennessee
- Memphis in May
