= Berclair, Memphis =

District of Memphis, Tennessee, US

Coordinates: 35.1568°N 89.9162°W

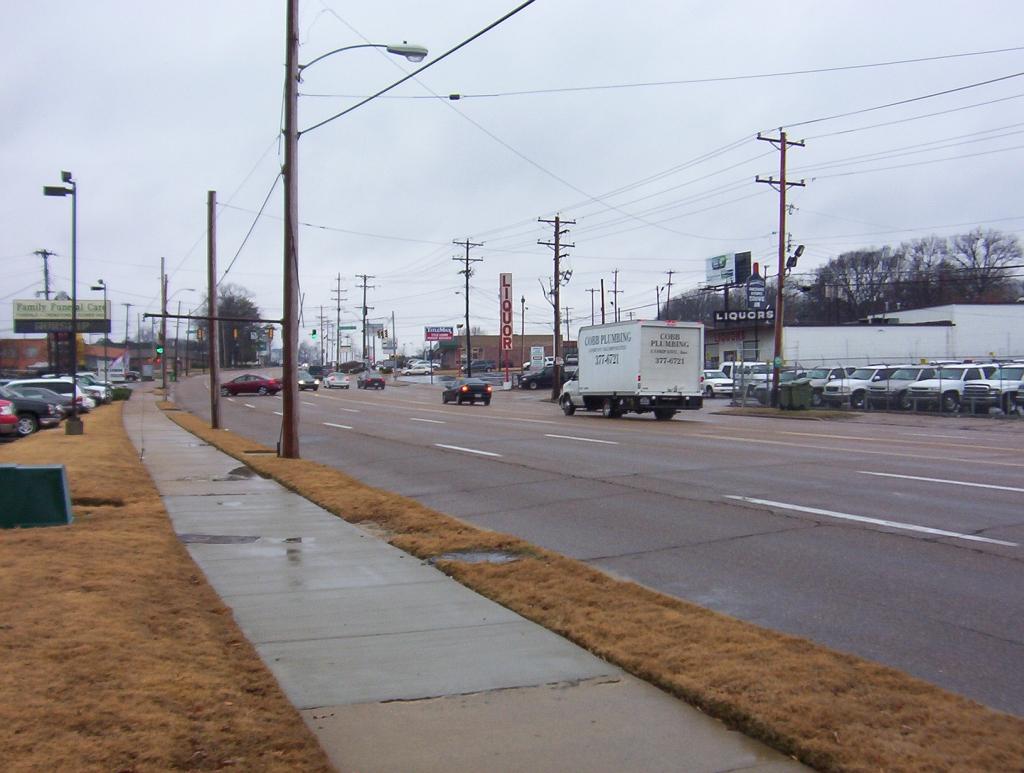
Summer Ave in Berclair (2008)

Berclair is a district of Memphis, Tennessee, United States, that is known for a major street in the district.

== Geography ==
Berclair is bordered by the CSX railroad to the north; Interstate 40, Covington Pike, and Stratford Road to the east; Summer Avenue to the south; and Graham Street to the west.

== History ==
=== Development ===
The area was developed shortly after World War II in the same manner as Levittown, New York, with many small houses for returning soldiers and their families. At its beginning, the area originally was not a part of Memphis, but was annexed into the city in the late 1950s or early 1960s.

Waring Road, which runs through Berclair, is named for George E. Waring, Jr., the innovative sanitary engineer who designed the drainage system that ended the era of yellow fever epidemics in 19th-century Memphis.

=== First Holiday Inn ===
The original Holiday Inn chain of hotels was founded in 1952 in Memphis by homebuilder Kemmons Wilson to provide inexpensive family accommodation for travelers in the US. Wilson opened the first Holiday Inn in September 1952 at 4941 Summer Avenue in Berclair, on the main road to Nashville. Although it no longer exists, a historical marker has been installed at the location.
