= Nonconnah Creek =

Coordinates: 35.0003702°N 89.6456376°W

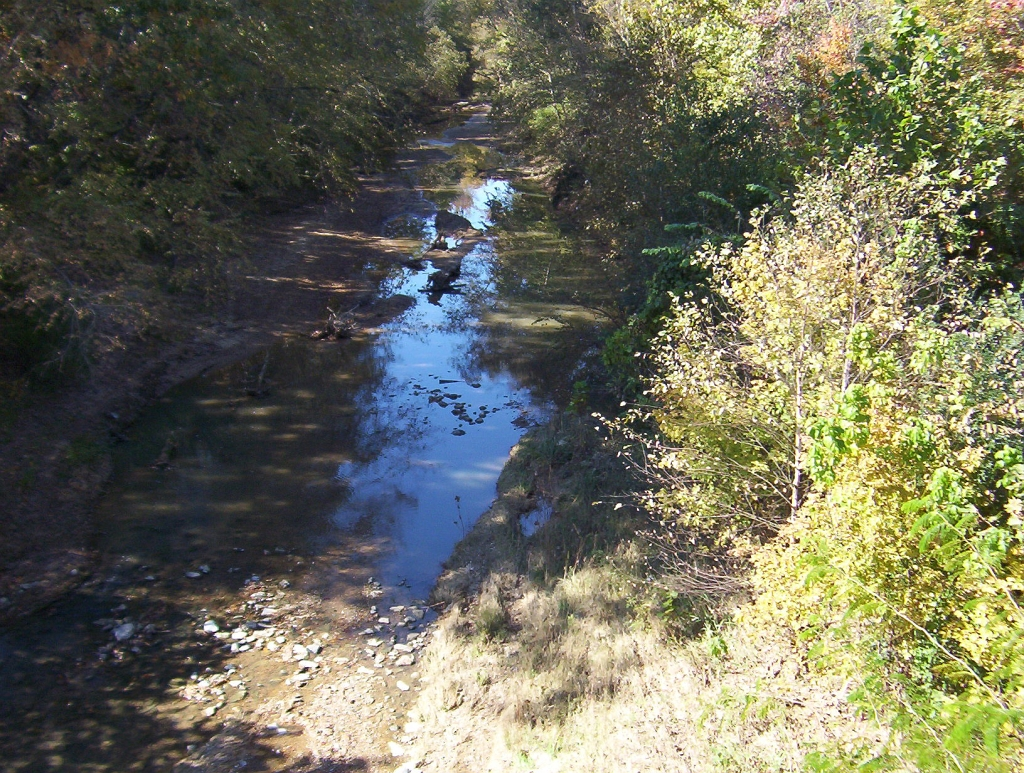
- Nonconnah Creek in 2008

Location
- Country: United States
- State: Tennessee

Physical characteristics
- Source
  - location: Shelby County, Tennessee
- Mouth
  - location: McKellar Lake
  - elevation: 200 ft (61 m)
- Length: 29.7 mi (47.8 km)
- Basin size: 281 mi^{2} (730 km^{2})

The Nonconnah Creek (or the Nonconnah Creek Drainage Canal) is a 29.7-mile-long (47.8 km) waterway in southwest Tennessee. It starts in extreme southeastern Shelby County, Tennessee, near the town of Collierville. From there, it flows westward, forming the southern border of Germantown. The creek continues to flow west through Memphis and through Whitehaven. Nonconnah Creek empties into McKellar Lake, an oxbow of the Mississippi River. There are three major expressways that follow most of its route. These are Interstate 55, Interstate 240, and Tennessee State Route 385, formerly named and still locally referred to as "Nonconnah Parkway".

== History ==
Nonconnah Creek was created from glacial runoff around 12,000 years ago. Prior to around year 400, the creek flowed from its headwaters west-northwesterly until the location of the present-day I-240/TN 385 interchange. From there it continued across what is now East Memphis and Midtown and connected with the Wolf River just before it empties into the Mississippi River. Around AD 400, a massive seismic event in the Ellendale Fault (part of the New Madrid Fault system) raised a low ridge across present-day east Memphis, diverting Nonconnah Creek away from the Wolf, causing it to flow directly into the Mississippi River several miles south of the Wolf's mouth. The lowermost section of the Nonconnah that continued to flow into the Wolf eventually became known as Cypress Creek.

Nonconnah Creek was widened and channelized in the 20th century (like many of the rivers in West Tennessee) from its mouth to near Houston Levee Road in Collierville.

== Name ==
Nonconnah is a name derived from the Choctaw language or Chickasaw language purported to mean "seer, prophet".

== Drainage basin ==
The Nonconnah Creek watershed covers parts of two counties in Tennessee (Shelby and Fayette) and two counties in Mississippi (Marshall and Desoto). The creek drains approximately half of the city of Memphis, the rest being drained by the Wolf River.

Nonconnah Creek
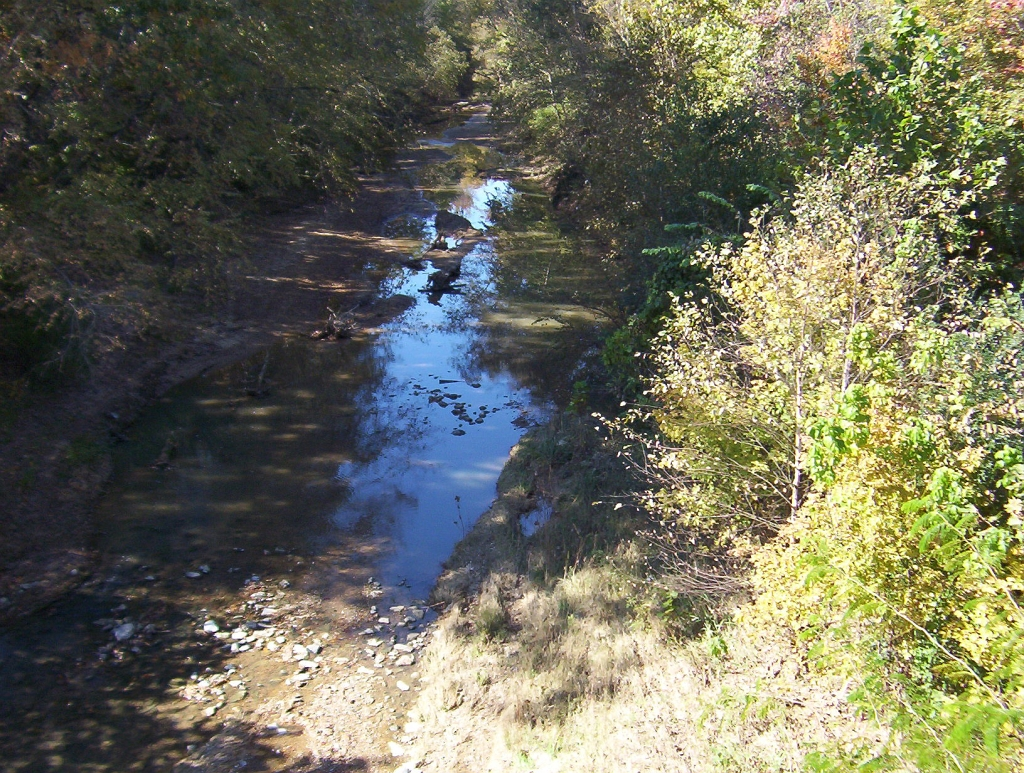

Basin features
- Tributaries
  - left: Days Creek (10.01 sq. miles, 10.6 miles segment length), Hurricane Creek (7.70 sq. miles, 13.3 miles segment length), Ten Mile Creek (9.03 sq. miles, 13.3 miles segment length), Johns Creek (26.08 sq. miles, 13.7 miles segment length)
  - right: Black Bayou (7.03 sq. miles, 7.9 miles segment length), Howard Road Outfall (3.24 sq. miles)

== Major flooding ==
Major floods occurred in the basin on November 21, 1934,when 10.48 inches of rain fell in 24 hours, and on May 9, 1958, when 4.76 inches of rain fell in approximately eight hours. The most recent significant flood occurred on December 3, 1978, when 4.9 inches were recorded at the Memphis International Airport. The 1978 storm appears to be between the 5-year and 10-year frequency events. Under present day conditions, the 1934 and 1958 flood levels would cause considerably higher damages due to increased urbanization.

== Backwater flooding ==
If the Mississippi River gets above 40 feet on the Memphis river gauge, the Nonconnah, along with other local streams and rivers connected to the Mississippi, will begin to experience backwater flooding, which is when these streams begin to flow backwards as the Mississippi river rises and fills them. Backwater flooding occurred in both the 1927 and 1937 floods along the Mississippi River. In the 1940s, the U.S. Army Corps of Engineers built an earthen levee system with pumping stations along the northern side of Nonconnah Creek from its mouth to Prospect Street in South Memphis. During the 2011 Mississippi River floods, these levees kept water off of the northern side. However, backwater flooding occurred on the south side causing damage to several subdivisions. The creek also flowed backwards within its channel to the Lamar Avenue (U.S. Route 78) overpass.

== Greenbelt ==
The Nonconnah Greenbelt, a proposed system of trails, is currently being planned and constructed. If completed, it would stretch from Collierville to the Mississippi River. Phase I was completed in late 2007. It is located near Collierville near the intersection of TN 385 and Forest Hill Irene Road.

== See also ==
- Mississippi River Flood Map of 1927
- 2011 Mississippi River floods
- List of rivers of Tennessee
