= List of neighborhoods in Memphis, Tennessee =

This is a list of neighborhoods in Memphis.

== Downtown ==
- Central Business District
- Edge District
- Harbor Town
- Linden
- Medical District
- Pinch District
- South Forum
- South Main Arts District
- Speedway Galloway
- Uptown/Greenlaw
- Victorian Village
- Warehouse District
- Winchester Park

== Midtown ==
- Annesdale
- Belleair
- Central Gardens
- Chickasaw Gardens
- Cooper-Young
- Crosstown
- Evergreen
- Hein Park
- Jefferson Heights
- Idlewild
- Lea's Woods
- Lenox
- Madison Heights
- Rozelle
- Speedway Terrace
- Tucker-Jefferson
- Vollintine-Evergreen, including Vollintine Hills
- Washington Bottoms

== University District ==
- East Buntyn
- Normal Station
- Joffre
- Messick-Buntyn
- Red Acres

== East Memphis ==
- Balmoral/Quince
- Belle Meade
- Berryhill
- Cherry/Willow
- Colonial Acres
- Fisherville
- Galloway Gardens/Walnut Grove
- Hedgemoor
- Hickory Hill
- High Point Terrace
- Pidgeon Estates
- River Oaks
- Sea Isle Park
- Sherwood Forest
- White Station

== North Memphis ==
- Douglass
- Frayser
- Hollywood
- Hyde Park
- Klondike
- New Chicago
- Scutterfeld
- Smokey City
- University Street Neighborhood

== Northeast ==
- Berclair-Jackson
- Binghampton
- Nutbush
- Raleigh
- Sycamore View
- Highland Heights
- Mitchell Heights

== South Memphis ==
- Alcy-Ball
- Barton Heights
- Boxtown
- Bunker Hill
- Coro Lake
- Diamond Estates
- Dixie Heights
- Dukestown
- Elliston Heights
- Emerald Estates
- French Fort
- Gaslight Square
- Handy Holiday
- Indian Hills
- Lakeview Gardens
- Lauderdale Sub
- Longview
- Mallory Heights
- Nehemiah
- Pine Hill
- Prospect Park
- Riverside
- Ruby Estates
- Southern Heights
- Soulsville
- Walker Homes
- West Junction
- Westhaven
- Westwood
- Whitehaven
- Wilbert Heights

== Southeast ==
- Bethel Grove
- Capleville
- Castalia
- Cherokee
- Easthaven
- Fairlawn
- Fox Meadows
- Hickory Hill
- Magnolia
- Oakhaven
- Orange Mound
- Parkway Village
- Riverdale
- Southwind

== East Parkway District ==
- Fairgrounds
- Glenview
- Lamar Avenue (Highway 78)
- Poplar Avenue
- Union Extended

== See also ==
- Geography of Memphis, Tennessee
- Memphis metropolitan area
