= East Memphis, Memphis, Tennessee =

Eastern section of Memphis, Tennessee

Coordinates: 35.136°N 89.880°W

East Memphis
- Neighbhorhood of Memphis
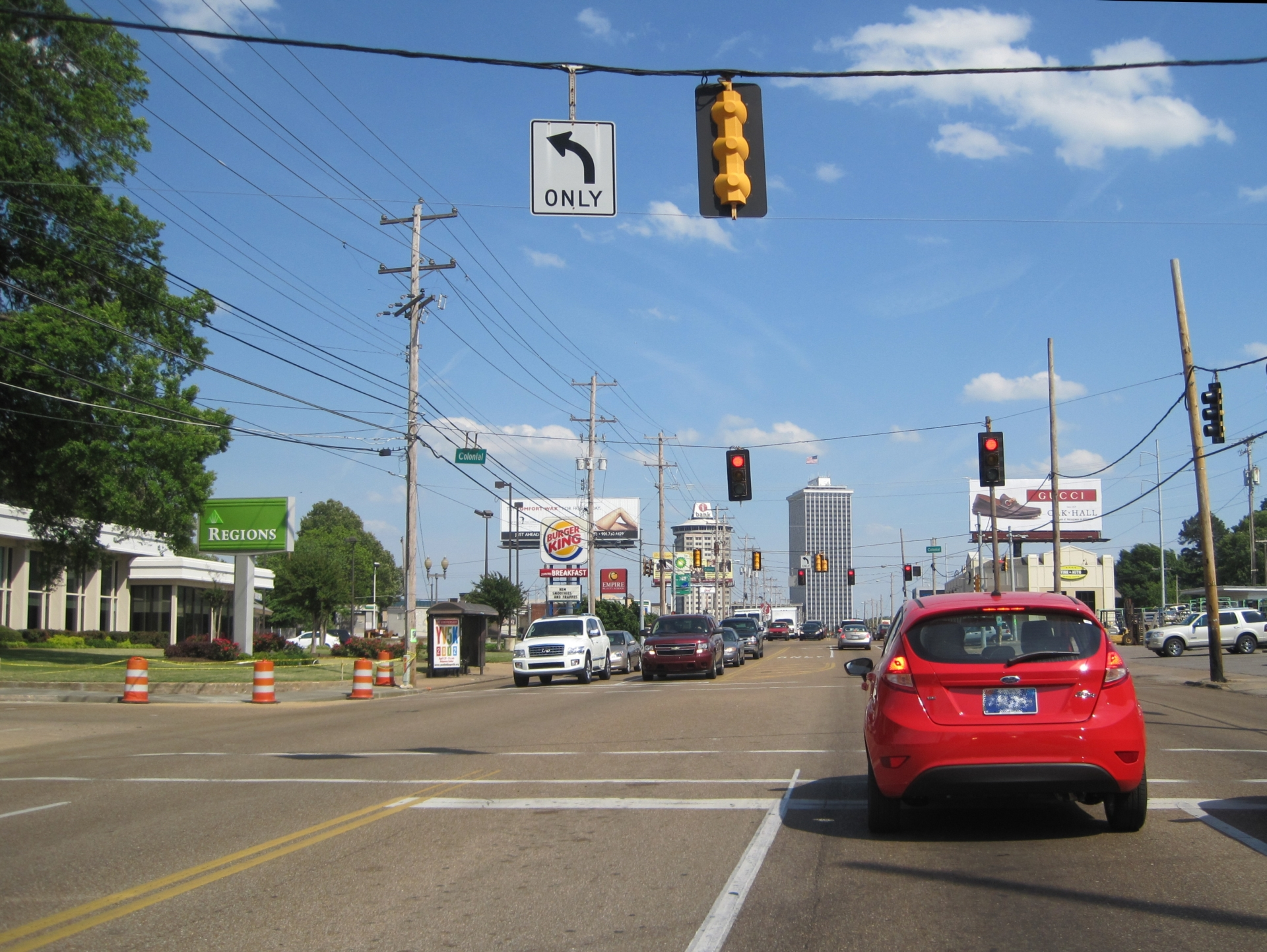
- Poplar Avenue, a major road through East Memphis, runs by prominent buildings including White Station Tower (rear left) and Clark Tower (rear right).
- Interactive map of East Memphis
- Country: United States
- State: Tennessee
- County: Shelby County

East Memphis is a region of Memphis, Tennessee with several defined and informal subdivisions and neighborhoods such as Colonial Acres, White Station-Yates, Sherwood Forest, Normal Station, High Point Terrace, Belle Meade, Normandy Meadows, St. Nick, Pleasant Acres, Balmoral, and Ridgeway. The general boundaries are Highland Street to the west, I-240 to the south and east, and Sam Cooper Blvd to the north. However, many consider the eastern extent of the neighborhood to be the Germantown city limits and the Cordova community.

The primary zip codes in this area are 38111, 38117, and 38157, including 38120 and 38119. In 1950, the eastern boundary of Memphis was essentially the western boundary of what is today East Memphis. By the mid-1960s, most of East Memphis inside the I-240 loop had been annexed by the city of Memphis.

== Overview ==
East Memphis is a commercial and residential powerhouse. Poplar Avenue provides the central east–west thoroughfare of the area, and there are many thriving businesses on and around it. East Memphis is the location of some of the largest homes in Memphis, specifically those in the Walnut Grove area, and is home to Clark Tower. The area also has developed into a home for many businesses and law firms. Walnut Grove Road has a high concentration of churches and schools. Poplar Plaza shopping center at the corner of Poplar and Highland St. could be the beginning of the East Memphis commercial district. Highland St. is mostly commercial, with a collection of high-rise low-to-moderate residential buildings, as well as Crichton College. The University of Memphis sits south of Central Ave. and north of Southern Ave., with the Highland strip bordering it on its western side. East Memphis covers areas outside of the I-240 Loop including the residential areas around Quince Road and Kirby Parkway, and River Oaks subdivision. A commercial center has developed around the intersection of Poplar and Ridgeway Road which includes the Hilton Memphis, the largest hotel in the city. The eastern border of the neighborhood is the Germantown city limits at Kirby Parkway.

The major shopping venues in East Memphis are Eastgate Shopping Center, Poplar Plaza Shopping Center, Oak Court Mall, Laurelwood Collection, Regalia, and Park Place Center.

== Parks and places ==
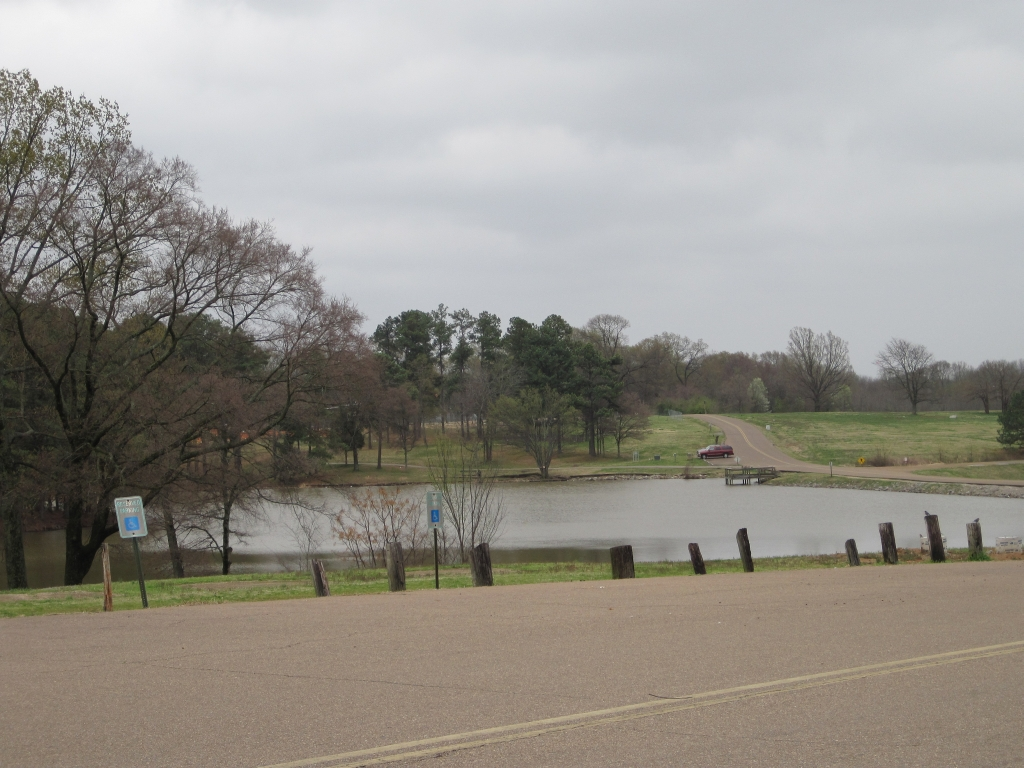
Shelby Farms, one of the largest urban parks in the United States.

=== Museums, parks, and gardens ===
- Audubon Park
- Dixon Gallery and Gardens
- Davis Park
- Sea Isle Park
- Willow Rd. Park
- Pauline "Pep" Marquette Park
- Memphis Country Club
- Shelby Farms Park

=== Other places of note ===
- Eastgate Shopping Center
- Malco Paradiso Cinema Grill And IMAX
- Oak Court Mall
- St. Francis Hospital
- Baptist Memorial Hospital
- Memorial Park Cemetery
- Theatre Memphis

== Religion ==
East Memphis is home to many churches of various denominations. The largest churches are Christ Church with 6,000 members, St. Louis Catholic Church with about 5,000 members, Second Presbyterian Church with more than 4,800 members, and Highpoint Church with more than 3,500 members. Other places of worship include Robinhood Lane Baptist Church, Cherry Road Baptist Church, and New Philadelphia Church.

The area is also home to many of the city's Jewish congregations, including Baron Hirsch Synagogue, Anshei Sphard Beth El Emeth Congregation, Young Israel of Memphis, Beth Sholom, and Temple Israel.

== Schools ==
=== Colleges ===
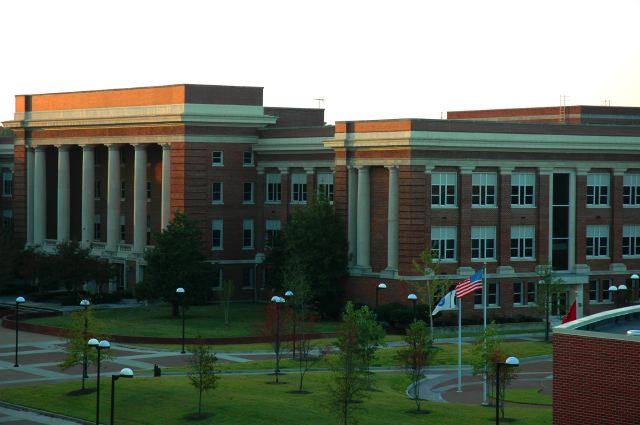
University of Memphis campus

The University of Memphis is located in East Memphis.

=== Public schools ===
- East High School
- Willow Oaks Elementary
- Sea Isle Elementary
- Colonial Middle
- Overton High
- Ridgeway Elementary, Middle and High
- South Park Elementary
- Sharpe Elementary
- Sherwood Elementary and Middle
- Richland Elementary School
- White Station High School
- White Station Elementary School
- White Station Middle School
- Hickory Ridge Elementary and Middle

=== Religiously affiliated schools ===
- Catholic: Christian Brothers High School (All-boys, 9–12), St. Agnes Academy (All-girls, Pre-K-12), Holy Rosary School (Co-ed, Pre K–8), St. Ann School (Co-ed, K–8), St. Dominic School (All boys, Pre K–8), St. Louis School (Co-ed, Pre K–8), St. Michael School (Co-ed, Pre K–8)
- Church of Christ: Harding Academy (Co-ed, Pre K–12)
- Episcopal: St. Mary's Episcopal School (All-girls, Pre K–12)
- Lutheran: Christ The King Lutheran School (Co-ed, K–8)
- Jewish: Bornblum Solomon Schechter School (Co-ed, 1–8), Margolin Hebrew Academy (Co-ed, Pre K–12), Memphis Jewish High School (Co-ed, 9–12)
- Methodist: Christ Methodist Day School (Co-ed, Pre K–6)
- Nondenominational Christian: Briarcrest Christian School (Co-ed, Pre K–8), Evangelical Christian School (Co-ed Pre K–5), Hutchison School (All-girls, Pre K–12), Memphis University School (All-boys, 7–12)
- Presbyterian: Presbyterian Day School (All-boys, Pre K–6), Woodland Presbyterian School (Co-ed, Pre K–8)

== Restaurants ==
East Memphis is host to a plethora of dining establishments ranging from inexpensive barbecue/sandwich shops to four-star restaurants. These include One & Only BBQ, Three Little Pigs BBQ, Corky's, Pete & Sam's, Houston's, Buckley's Restaurant, Huey's, and Folk's Folly.

External Link: Memphis Travel: East Memphis Restaurant Guide

== Gallery ==
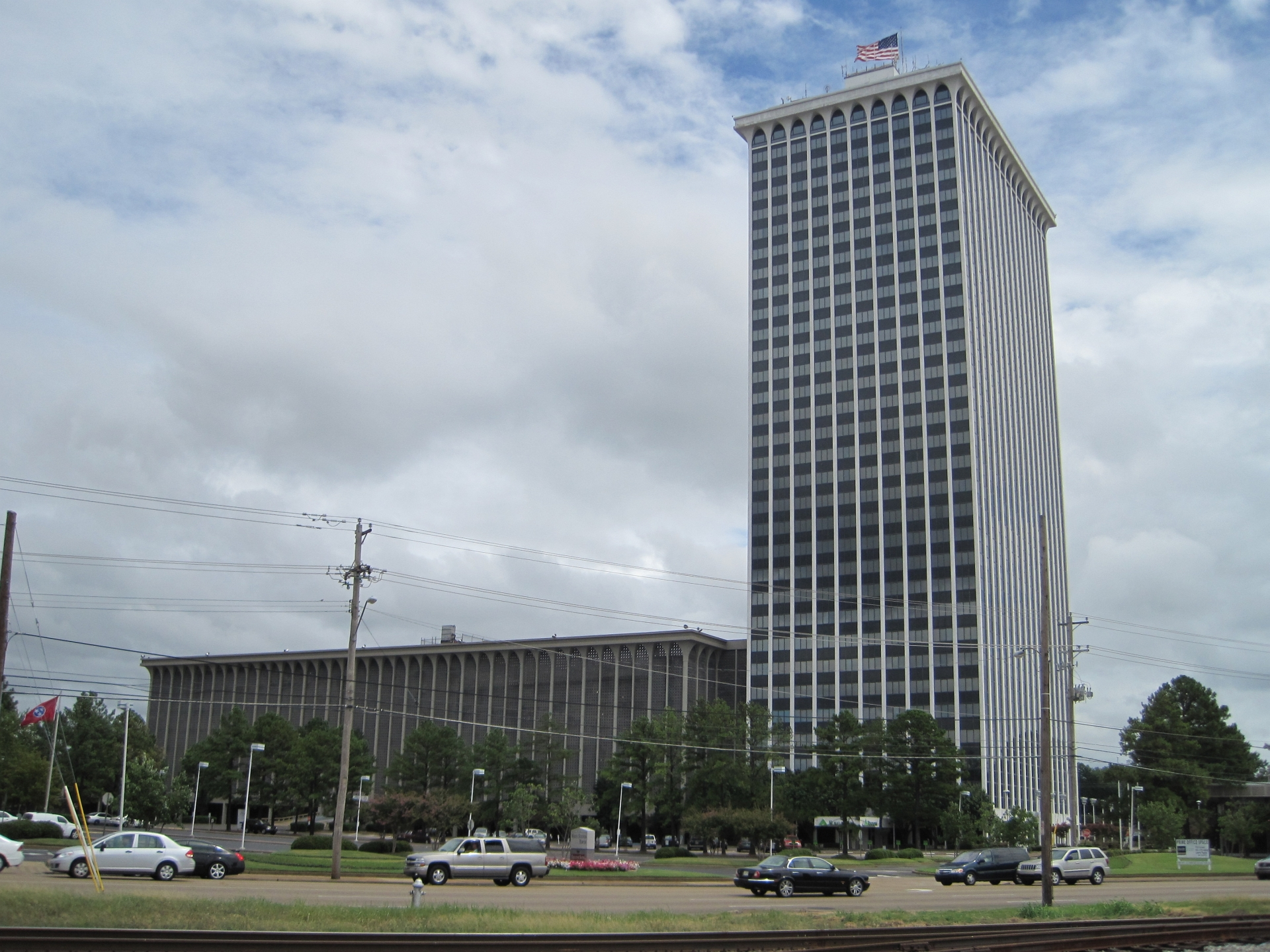
Clark Tower, the tallest building in East Memphis

Hilton Memphis, the tallest hotel in Memphis

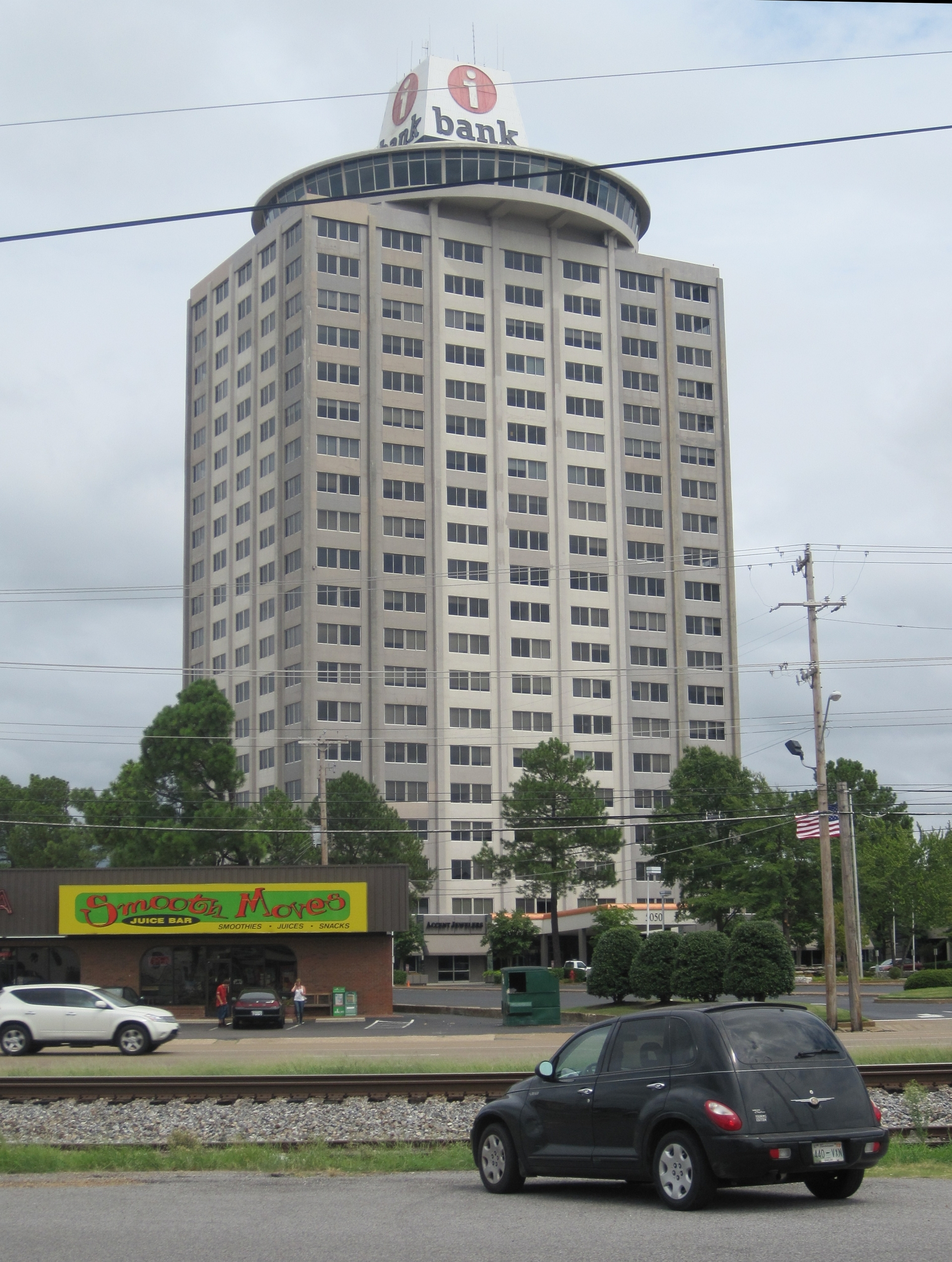
White Station Tower

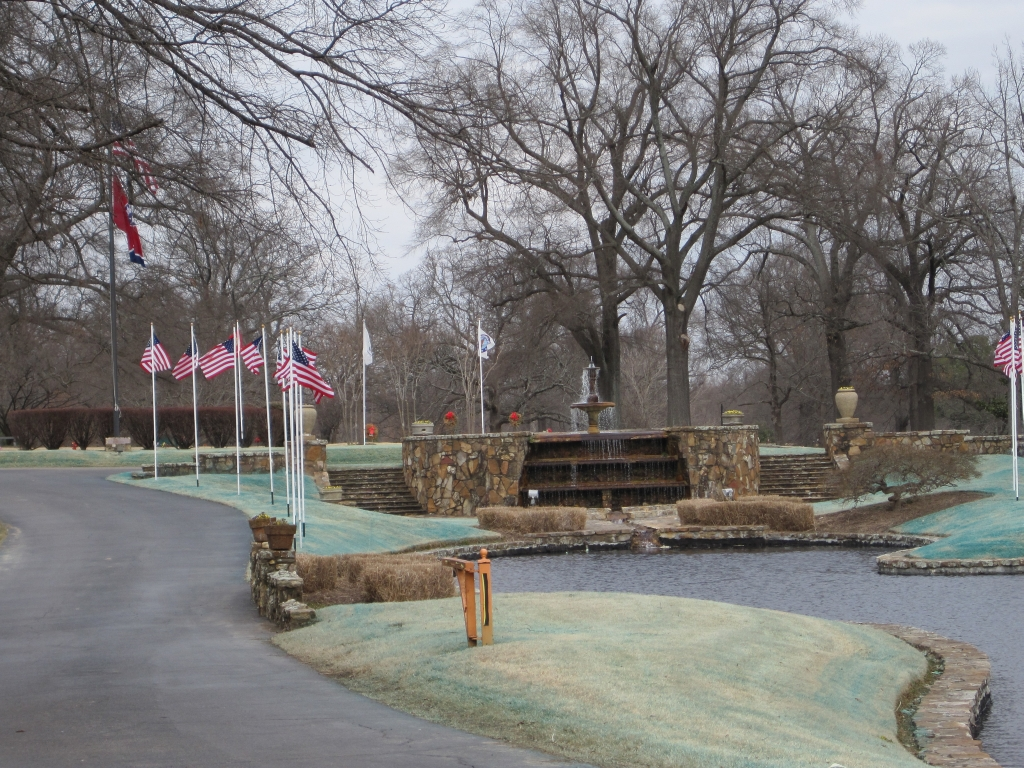
Memorial Park Cemetery
