= Kugel fountain =

Sphere floating on a very thin film of water on a fountain basin

Principle of operation of a Kugel fountain (A) Water flowing between the sphere and its shaped holder lifts the ball slightly. (B) Water flows over the sides into a reservoir. (C) Water is pumped back in an endless loop. (D) Pump. (E) Ball can easily be moved by hand.

A kugel fountain (also called a floating sphere fountain or by the pleonasmic name kugel ball) is a water feature or sculpture where a sphere sits in a fitted hollow in a pedestal, and is supported by aquaplaning on a thin film of water. Pressurized water flows between the sphere and socket, creating a mechanical hydrostatic bearing that is nearly frictionless. The sphere can weigh thousands of kilograms, but the efficient bearing allows it to be spun by the force of a hand. The sphere does not float, being denser than water; it is often made from granite. The hydraulics of the fountain can be controlled so that the axis of rotation of the sphere changes continually. Ring, wheel and disc sculptures that rotate on an axis are also built.

Kugel fountains can be found all over the world. Many are at popular tourist destinations, such as science museums, shopping centers, lobbies, and gardens.

Kugel is the German word for ball or sphere.

== Locations of kugel fountains ==
Facility	City	Country	Diameter	GPS Coordinate	Further information
Temaikèn Park	Belén de Escobar, Buenos Aires Province	Argentina		34.366725°S 58.804462°W	
	Feldkirch	Austria		Unknown	
Casino Innsbruck	Innsbruck	Austria	1.2 m (47 in)	47.262688°N 11.396148°E	This kugelbrunnen (English: kugel fountain) is located in front of the Casino Innsbruck at Salurner Straße 15 in Innsbruck, Austria. Installed 2000 - Welte IHT - https://kusser.com/en_INT/portfolio/ball-fountain-casino-innsbruck/
Casino Velden	Velden	Austria		46.615243°N 14.043190°E	
Casino Seefeld	Seefeld	Austria		47.329167°N 11.189444°E	
People's Globe, Fairfield Showground	Prairiewood, New South Wales	Australia	1.6 m (63 in)	33.8691937°S 150.9046948°E	Installed 2021, shows map of world and distances migrants travelled to Fairfield.
Questacon	Canberra, Australian Capital Territory	Australia		35.298158°S 149.131507°E	
	Bowral, New South Wales	Australia		34.477105°S 150.418071°E	
Casuarina Square	Darwin, Northern Territory	Australia		12.375488°S 130.882411°E	
SkyHigh Mount Dandenong	Victoria	Australia		37.826974°S 145.3528°E	
Forrest Place	Perth, Western Australia	Australia		31.952756°S 115.859182°E	
The University of Western Australia, CS Department	Perth, Western Australia	Australia		31.97781°S 115.81645°E	Installed 2009
Atlantis Hotel	Nassau	Bahamas		N 25° 05.028 W 077° 19.330	https://waymarking.com/waymarks/wm11W05_Pearl_of_Atlantis_Kugel_Ball_Nassau_Bahamas
Place du Martyr	Verviers	Belgium		50.5934996°N 5.8599302°E	Installed in 2003, called "Rio + 10"
WestJet Headquarters	Calgary, Alberta	Canada		51.121511°N 114.008751°W (Note: Visible from Google satellite view) (Note: Visible from Google street view)	
Chinatown	Victoria, British Columbia	Canada		48.429117°N 123.366900°W	Floating metal sphere, not a Kugel ball
Dundarave	West Vancouver, British Columbia	Canada		49.333258°N 123.182506°W	
Guinness World Records Museum	Niagara Falls, Ontario	Canada		43.091872°N 79.075985°W	
Holiday Inn Express Montreal Airport	Montreal, Quebec	Canada		45.461109°N 73.723973°W	
Foxconn Factory Courtyard	Kutna Hora, Central Bohemia	Czech Republic		49.941992°N 15.282243°E	
Lyngby Storcenter	Lyngby	Denmark		55.771329°N 12.505888°E	
University of Helsinki, Physicum building	Helsinki	Finland	0.5 m (20 in)	60.205102°N 24.962891°E	
Rotuaari pedestrian street	Oulu	Finland		65.012207°N 25.471133°E	
Hämeenpuisto	Tampere	Finland		61.497792°N 23.751926°E	
Casino Grand Cercle	Aix-les-Bains	France		45°41′20″N 5°54′50″E	
Rue de Bretagne	Alençon	France		48°25′53″N 0°04′38″E	
Square des longs-prés	Boulogne-Billancourt, Île de France	France		48°49′56″N 2°14′47″E	
Place de l'Hôtel de ville	Le Havre	France		49°29′34″N 0°06′28″E	
Près-La-Rose natural park	Montbéliard	France		47°30′21″N 6°48′11″E	
Spreebogen	Berlin	Germany	1.5 m (59 in)	52.522983°N 13.346974°E	Architect: Stephan Haan; Material: Granite
Sparkasse Bensheim	Bensheim	Germany		49.681111°N 8.618056°E	
Schweinemarktplatz	Crailsheim	Germany		49.136516°N 10.072113°E	
Äußere Neustadt, Martin-Luther-Platz	Dresden	Germany		51.06438°N 13.75621°E	
	Düren	Germany		50.80593°N 6.48238°E	
	Erlangen	Germany		49.595552°N 11.005286°E	
Garmisch-Partenkirchen Casino	Garmisch-Partenkirchen	Germany		47.493889°N 11.090278°E	Am Kurpark 10, 82467 Garmisch-Partenkirchen, Germany
Palmengarten	Frankfurt am Main	Germany		50.116667°N 8.683333°E	
Hanse-Viertel	Hamburg	Germany	2.11 m (83 in)	53.552890°N 9.988048°E	Installed in 2012
Westpark	Munich	Germany		48.122954°N 11.531178°E	
Tibusplatz	Münster	Germany		51.965940°N 7.627233°W,	
Europa-Park, Schlosspark	Rust	Germany		48.268611°N 7.723889°E,	
Herrenschreiberstraße	Rheine	Germany		52.277445°N 7.438585°W,	
City Center, Riesenstraße	Kaiserslautern, Rheinland-Pfalz	Germany		49.442902°N 7.770518°E	
	Langenfeld	Germany		51.109795°N 6.948499°E	
Calwer Straße	Stuttgart	Germany	1.0 m (39 in)	48.77634268°N 9.17419541°E	
SAP SE Headquarters	Walldorf	Germany	1.5 m (59 in)		
Am Zwinger 1	Sankt Wendel	Germany		49.468055°N 7.168804°E	
House of Science	Patras	Greece	1.0 m (39 in)		A granite sphere of a diameter of precisely 1 m, immersed in the water basin up to the angle of 35° from the bottom.
Bengaluru International Airport Terminal	Bangalore	India		13.1989°N 77.7056°E	
W5 Interactive Discovery Centre	Belfast	Northern Ireland		54.603768°N 5.91560°W	
Bloomfield Science Museum	Jerusalem	Israel		31.7781°N 35.2007°E	
Parco Commerciale Dora	Turin	Italy		45.087556°N 7.668025°E	
Incrocio Viale Giosuè Carducci-Via Filzi	Riva del Garda	Italy		45.885812°N 10.845519°E	
Parco	Kumamoto	Japan		32.802953°N 130.710127°E	
Lobby of the Radisson Blu Hotel	Salwa, Kuwait City	Kuwait		29.375°N 48.08722°E	
Triq it-Torri	Sliema	Malta		35.914802°N 14.496526°E	
Te Papa Museum	Wellington	New Zealand		41.290556°S 174.781389°E	
Centrum of Tjuvholmen Aker brygge	Oslo	Norway		59.909499°N 10.723976°E	
Byrkjedalstunet	Rogaland	Norway		58.779475°N 6.317047°E	
Flåm	Sogn og Fjordane	Norway		60.863663°N 7.117002°E	
Park Zdrojowy	Polanica-Zdrój	Poland		50.409609°N 16.51015°E	
"The Solar System"	Tarnów	Poland		50.008342°N 20.975346°E	
Predmostnaya Ploshchad	Krasnoyarsk	Russia	1.4 m (55 in)	55.991543°N 92.8879158°E	The city has six kugel balls.
Malaya Sadovaya Street	Saint Petersburg	Russia		59.93421°N 30.33744°E	
Petnica	Valjevo	Serbia		44.2599°N 19.9286°E	
Patrimonio Inteligente	Puerto Lumbreras, Región de Murcia	Spain		37.577255°N 1.793379°W	
Casa de las Ciencias	A Coruña	Spain		43.3618°N 8.413951°W	
Museo Nacional de Ciencia y Tecnología	Alcobendas, Madrid	Spain		40.537837°N 3.640595°W	
Museo Elder de la Ciencia y la Tecnología	Las Palmas de Gran Canaria	Spain		28.141104ºN 15.429532ºW	
Kaggensgatan Pedestrian Street	Kalmar	Sweden		56.661616°N 16.364538°E	
Kursaal	Bern	Switzerland		46.952857°N 7.449401°E	Due to construction/renovation work at the Kursaal Bern the Kugelbrunnen has been sold to a private person and moved to an undisclosed location.
Rue Cheneau-de-Bourg	Lausanne	Switzerland		46.520139°N 6.636332°E	
Zürichhorn	Zurich	Switzerland		47.35321°N 8.55182°E	
Donbas Arena	Donetsk	Ukraine		48°01′15″N 37°48′34″E	
Waitrose car park	Abingdon	England		51.671882°N 1.279409°W	
Carsington Water Visitor Center	Derbyshire	England		53.061064°N 1.641143°W	
Paultons Park	Hampshire	England		50.948699°N 1.552747°W	
Town Centre	Kenilworth	England		52.343929°N 1.579821°W	
Techniquest	Cardiff	Wales		51.462671°N 3.168174°W	
	Amarillo, Texas	United States		35.207017°N 101.830733°W	
"Discovery", Columbus Learning Center	Columbus, Indiana	United States		39.252718°N 85.902096°W	
Water Tower Plaza	Gilbert, Arizona	United States		33.354769°N 111.790991°W	
Disneyland	Anaheim, California	United States		33.811818°N 117.917062°W	
Disney California Adventure Park	Anaheim, California	United States		33°48′16.6″N 117°55′17.0″W	
Amtrak Station	Bakersfield, California	United States		35.372165°N 119.008178°W	
San Diego Zoo Safari Park	Escondido, California	United States	0.6 m (24 in) (Note: Approximate)	33.09866°N 116.99889°W	
San Diego Zoo	San Diego, California	United States		32.733666°N 117.148939°W	
Hollywood Guinness Museum	Los Angeles, California	United States		34.1012808°N 118.3380203°W	4,970 kg (10,958 lb)
Livermorium Plaza	Livermore, California	United States		37.68208°N 121.76803°W	Opened 15 June 2022, this plaza commemorates the creation of the element livermorium (Lv).
Morgan Stanley	La Jolla, California	United States		32.848190°N 117.273526°W	
California Baptist University	Riverside, California	United States		33.93°N 117.425°W	
Canyon Creek Park	San Jose, CA	United States		37.290687°N 121.768548°W	
Fry's Electronics	San Marcos, California	United States	1.0 m (40 in)	33.13712°N 117.183952°W	
Railroad Community Park	Santa Paula, California,	United States		34.35597°N 119.0604°W	
29th Street Mall	Boulder, Colorado	United States		40.01715°N 105.25585°W	
Belmar Shopping Center	Lakewood, Colorado	United States		39.708726°N 105.077594°W	
Kennedy Space Center Visitor Complex	Merritt Island, Florida	United States		28.522486°N 80.681198°W	
Magic Kingdom Walt Disney World	Orlando, Florida	United States		28.4186592°N 81.5792516°W	
State Botanical Garden of Georgia	Athens, Georgia	United States		33.901103°N 83.383138°W	
Lincoln Park Zoo	Chicago, Illinois	United States		41.9211°N 87.6355°W	
Morton Arboretum	Illinois	United States		41.81393°N 88.06997°W	
Abt Electronics	Glenview, Illinois	United States		42.067964°N 87.852602°W	
Holliday Park Nature Center	Indianapolis, Indiana	United States		39.871552°N 86.161384°W	
Columbian Park Zoo	Lafayette, Indiana	United States	1.1 m (42 in)	40.413348°N 86.870509°W	The sphere fountain is a product of Kusser Fountain Works in Germany, a gift from The McAllister Foundation.
Coleman-Morse Center	Notre Dame, Indiana	United States		41.700701°N 86.240622°W	
Iowa State Fairgrounds	Des Moines, Iowa	United States		41.595546°N 93.551049°W	
Louisville Zoo	Louisville, Kentucky	United States		38.205438°N 85.707023°W	
Marshall Nemer Pavilion, Lourdes Hospital	Paducah, Kentucky	United States		Unknown	
Towne Center at Cedar Lodge	Baton Rouge, Louisiana	United States		30.432830°N 91.112009°W	
The Ripley's Believe It or Not Museum	Baltimore, Maryland	United States		39.285164°N 76.612068°W	
Davison Township Police Department	Davison, Michigan	United States		43.027255°N 83.555757°W	
The Frank's Nursery and Crafts Rose Garden at Michigan State University	East Lansing, Michigan	United States		42.72079°N 84.47413°W	
Private home	Superior Township, Michigan	United States	1.2 m (48 in)	42.323598°N 83.597744°W	2,500 kg (5,600 lb)
Somerset Collection	Troy, Michigan	United States		42°33′41″N 83°11′2″W	1,930 kg (4,250 lb)
Mississippi College	Clinton, Mississippi	United States		32.336269°N 90.329185°W	
Kansas City Life Insurance Company	Kansas City, Missouri	United States		39.063666°N 94.590743°W	
Bob Devaney Sports Center	Lincoln, Nebraska	United States	1.2 m (48 in)	40.830207°N 96.697644°W	Installed in 2011 by Top Stone
Henry Doorly Zoo	Omaha, Nebraska	United States		41.225158°N 95.927939°W	
Millennium Plaza	Omaha, Nebraska	United States		41.264191°N 96.162198°W	
Storyland	Glen, New Hampshire	United States		44°7′1.71″N 71°10′51.81″W,	
Duke Power	Charlotte, North Carolina	United States		35.2258014°N 80.8505208°W	
Elon University, Numen Lumen Pavilion	Elon, North Carolina	United States		36.102485°N 79.502274°W	Meditation garden
Martin Luther King Jr. Memorial	Rocky Mount, North Carolina	United States			
Canton Ohio Downtown	Canton, Ohio	United States		40.798682°N 81.374644°W	Destroyed By vandals
TriHealth Fitness & Health Pavilion	Cincinnati, Ohio	United States		39.255901°N 84.364927°W	
Bloch Cancer Survivors Plaza (park)	Columbus, Ohio	United States		40.007172°N 83.022688°W	
COSI Columbus	Columbus, Ohio	United States		Unknown	
The Mall at Tuttle Crossing	Columbus, Ohio	United States		Unknown	
Tulsa Zoo	Tulsa, Oklahoma	United States		36.212724°N 95.905802°W	
Nike Campus	Beaverton, Oregon	United States		Unknown	
McKenzie Park	Hermiston, Oregon	United States		45.839161°N 119.291164°W	
Railroad Plaza	Lansdale, Pennsylvania	United States		40.243083°N 75.285833°W	
Alter Hall, Temple University	Philadelphia, Pennsylvania	United States		39.980071°N 75.156248°W	
Reading Hospital	Reading, Pennsylvania	United States		40.329704°N 75.949492°W	
Robert E. Freeman Memorial Park	Providence, Rhode Island	United States		41.822196°N 71.413868°W	
Outside Mellow Mushroom	Mount Pleasant, South Carolina	United States		32.866696°N 79.785005°W	
The Ripley's Believe It or Not Museum	Myrtle Beach, South Carolina	United States		33.692292°N 78.879789°W	
The Ripley's Believe It or Not Museum	Gatlinburg, Tennessee	United States		35.711403°N 83.518453°W	
Miracle Field	Murfreesboro, Tennessee	United States			Located at McKnight Park. Kugel ball is a representative of a baseball, and bears the signature of Boston Red Sox pitcher and Murfreesboro native David Price. Miracle Field was constructed with funds from Price's charity, Project One Four. The facility opened on 6 May 2017.
Oak Court Mall	Memphis, Tennessee	United States		35.117305°N 89.913378°W	
Bicentennial Capitol Mall State Park (Earth kugel ball)	Nashville, Tennessee	United States	1.8 m (71 in)	36.172008°N 86.788634°W	World War II Memorial 18,000 lb (8,200 kg) lbs
Cancer Survivors Plaza	Dallas, Texas	United States		32.786083°N 96.795739°W	
Historic Downtown Grapevine	Grapevine, Texas	United States		32.939966°N 97.078247°W	
ConocoPhillips Campus	Houston, Texas	United States		29.788273°N 95.613542°W	
Houston Museum of Natural Science	Houston, Texas	United States		29.721932°N 95.390239°W	
Oaks Medical Group	Bountiful, Utah	United States		40.8871667°N 111.87116667°W	
University Place Orem	Orem, Utah	United States		40.2761075°N 111.6803086°W	
Utah's Hogle Zoo	Salt Lake City, Utah	United States		40.75°N 111.81412°W	
Lagoon Amusement Park	Farmington, Utah	United States		40.985556°N 111.894722°W	
Atlas Walk	Gainesville, Virginia	United States	1.32 m (52 in)	38.795686°N 77.609996°W	7000 pounds
Virginia Zoological Park	Norfolk, Virginia	United States		36.8786°N 76.2744°W	
International Mission Board	Richmond, Virginia	United States		37.5683565°N 77.4822119°W	
Science Museum of Virginia (Earth kugel ball)	Richmond, Virginia	United States	2.653 m (104.4 in)	37.560761°N 77.466157°W	World's largest since 2003
Science Museum of Virginia (Earth's Moon kugel ball)	Richmond, Virginia	United States	0.72 m (28 in)	37.561323°N 77.466698°W	
Crossroads Park	Bellevue, Washington	United States		47.617418°N 122.1227715°W	
Whatcom Community College	Bellingham, Washington	United States		48.79534°N 122.493681°W	
Pacific Science Center	Seattle, Washington	United States		47°37′9″N 122°21′4″W	
Milwaukee County Zoo	Milwaukee, Wisconsin	United States		43.134167°N 87.955833°W	
Casper Area Chamber of Commerce	Casper, Wyoming	United States		42.855157°N 106.325434°W	
Canyon Visitor Education Center	Yellowstone National Park, Wyoming	United States		44.734717°N 110.491888°W	
Five Points Centennial Plaza	Five Points (Columbia, South Carolina), South Carolina	United States		33.9976052°N 81.01667°W	
St. Rita's Medical Center	St. Rita's Medical Center, Ohio	United States		40.7409395°N 84.120673°W	
Jack C. Taylor Conference Center	Annapolis, Maryland	United States		38.987778°N 76.491389°W	Installed in front of the Jack C. Taylor Conference Center at the United States Naval Institute in 2021.
Piazza d’armi (a public square)	Carrara	Italy		Geographic data related to location at OpenStreetMap	Made by Kenneth Davis in 1979 1.8 tons
BREC Baton Rouge Zoo	Baton Rouge, Louisiana	United States			
Magic Kingdom	Bay Lake, Florida	United States			

== Gallery ==
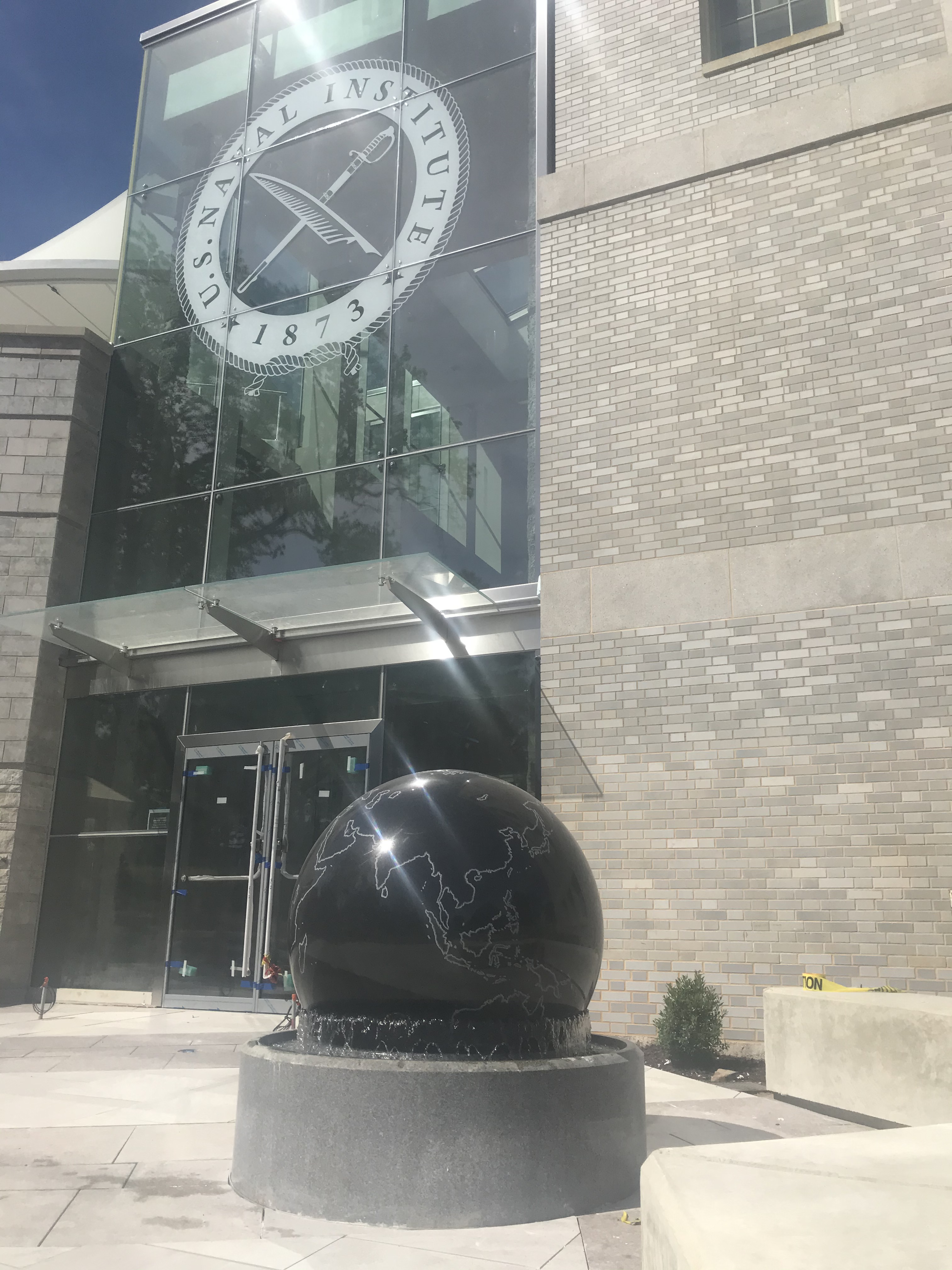
World globe, Jack C. Taylor Conference Center of the United States Naval Institute, Annapolis

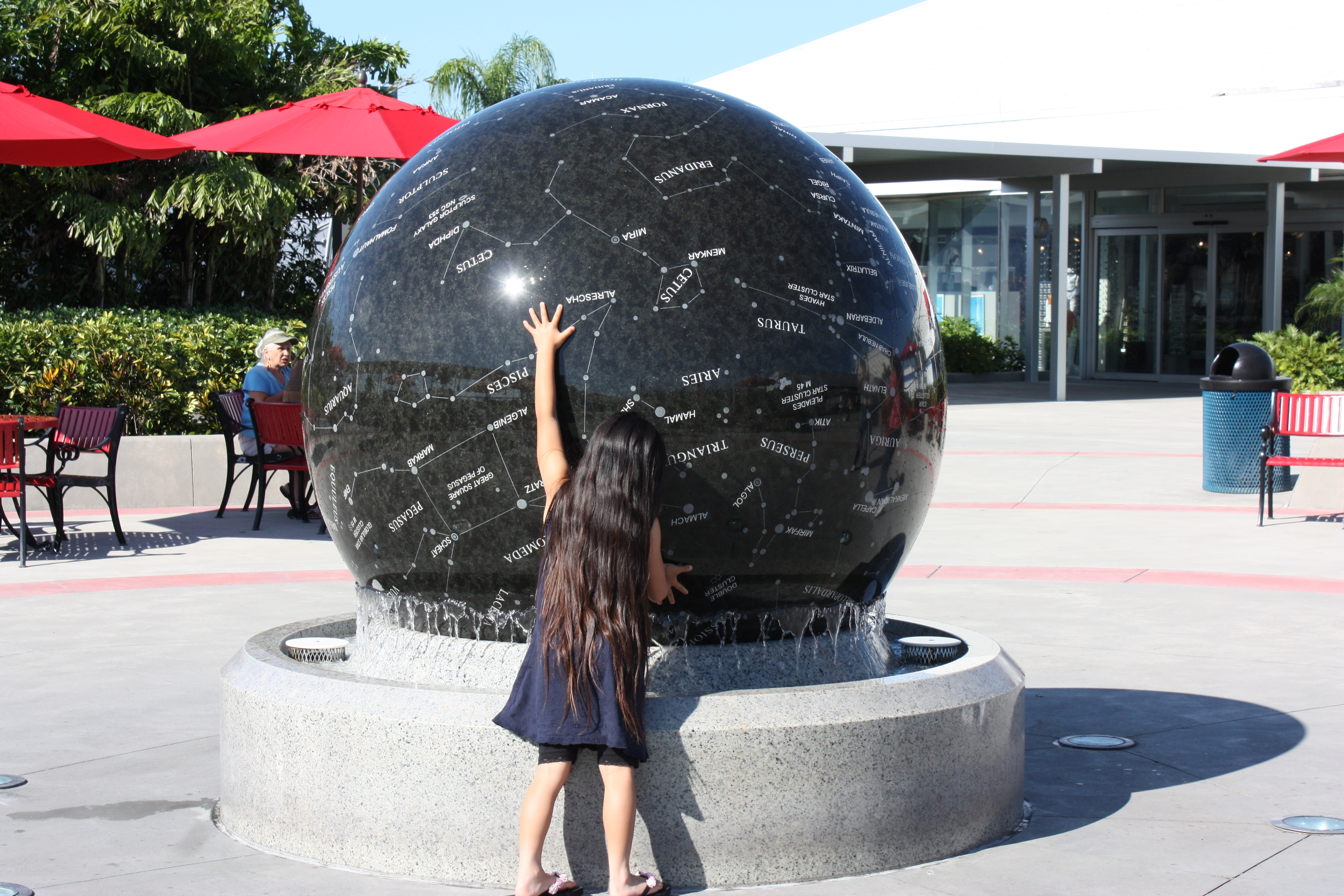
Celestial globe, weighing nine tons, being spun by a child at Kennedy Space Center Visitor Complex.

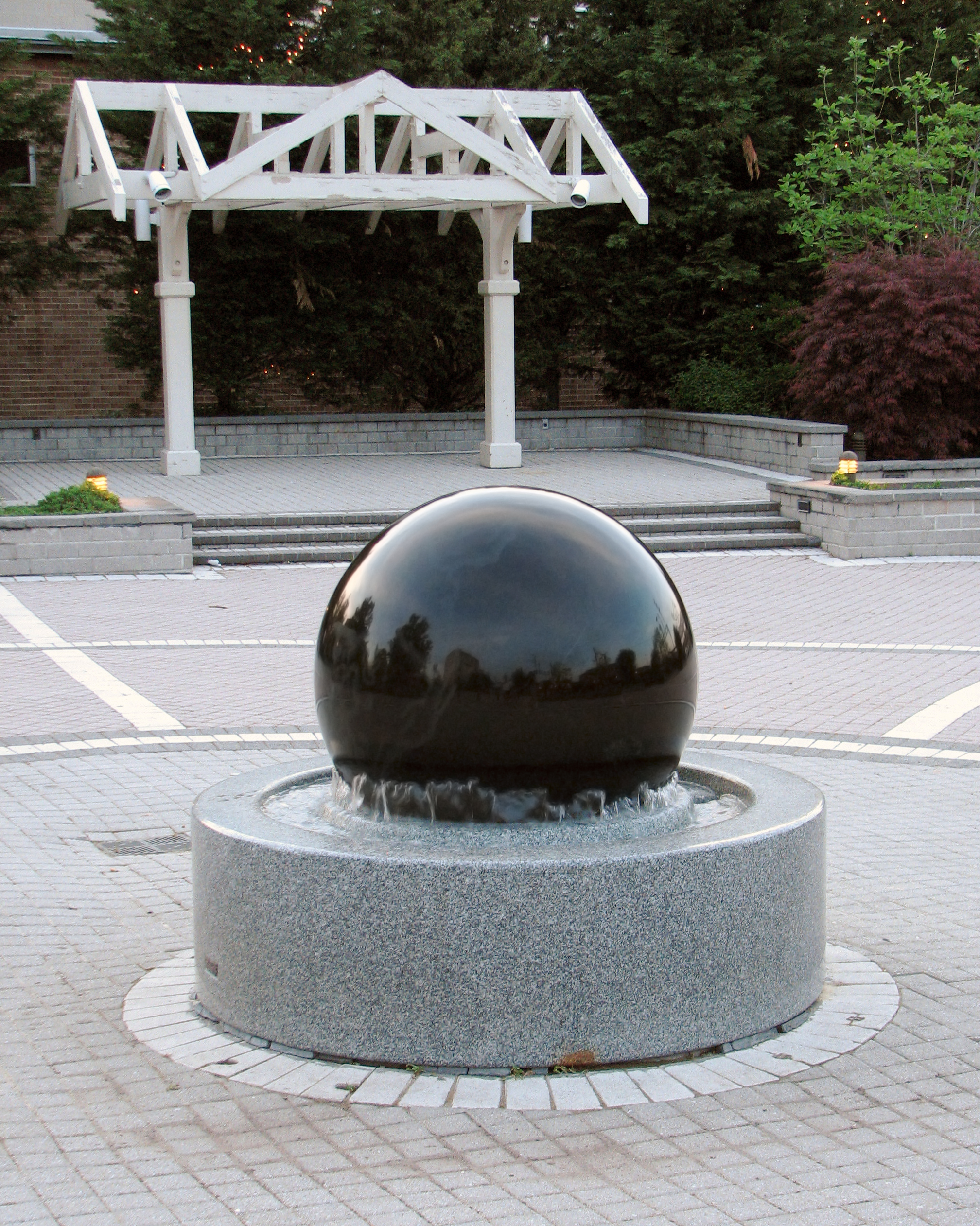
Lansdale station, Railroad Plaza, Lansdale, Pennsylvania

Sliema, Malta

The Kirchplatz fountain in Bottrop, Germany, with pigeon

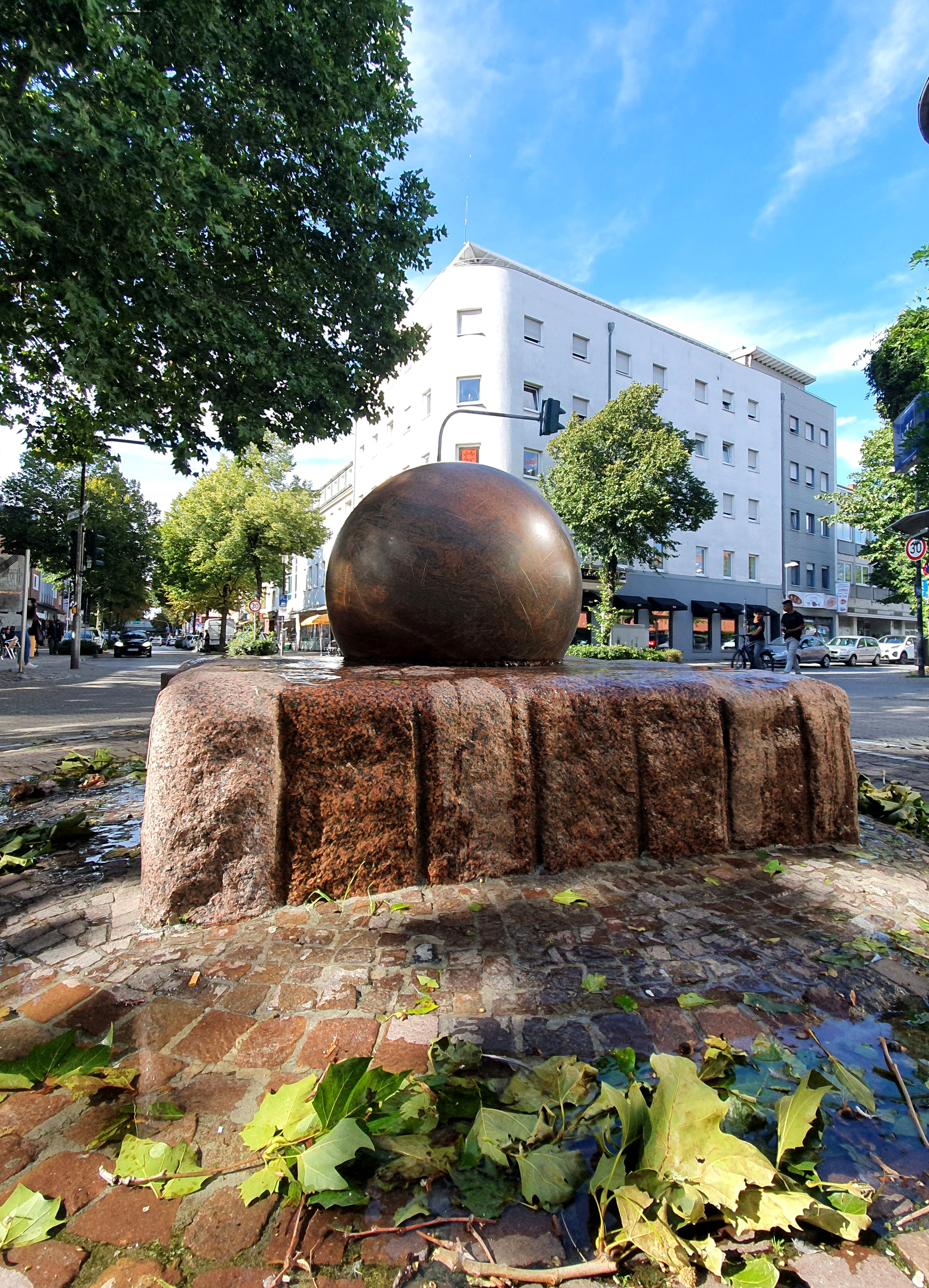
Kugel fountain in Dueren, Germany

The transplanted Döppersberger Brunnen in its new location in the Willy-Brandt-Platz in Wuppertal, Germany

== See also ==
- Aquaplaning – Loss of traction due to water buildup under tires
- Fluid bearing – Type of bearings which use pressurized liquid or gas between the bearing surfaces
- Lubrication theory – Flow of fluids within extremely thin regions
- Stone ball – Spherical man-made artifact composed of stone
- Stone spheres of Costa Rica – National symbol of Costa Rica
