= Chickasaw Gardens =

Neighborhood in Memphis, Tennessee, US

Coordinates: 35.1288°N 89.9630°W

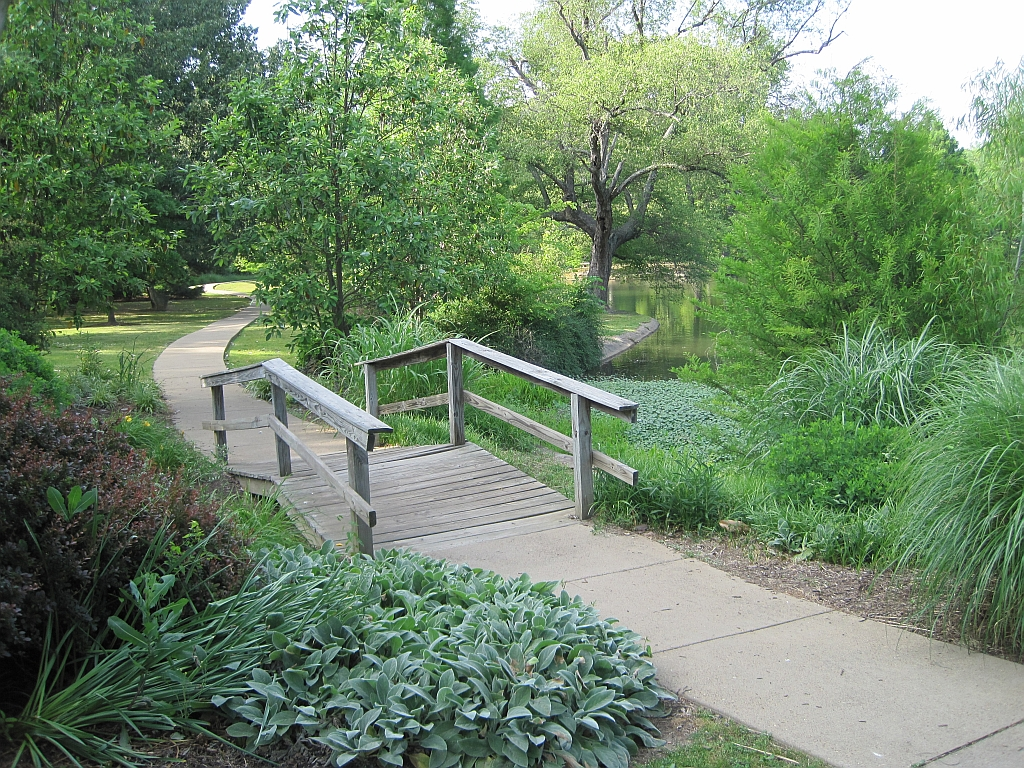
Walking path along Chickasaw Gardens Lake

Chickasaw Gardens is an established upscale neighborhood in midtown Memphis, Tennessee.

== Geography ==
Chickasaw Gardens is located between Central and Poplar Avenues, near the center of the Interstate 240 loop. The Memphis Pink Palace Museum and Planetarium, the Central Library of the Memphis Public Library System, and the University of Memphis are nearby.

=== Setting ===
Chickasaw Gardens features a lake, sometimes called Memphis Lake or Chickasaw Gardens Lake, home to ducks and other birds. There is a concrete path leading around the west side. Neither fishing nor boats are allowed.

Running parallel to the lake is a ditch, along the west side of the lake. It is surrounded by a fence. The south end runs to Orange Mound and under Central Avenue, while the north end runs under Poplar Avenue and beside the East High School football and track field. Crossing the ditch, there are vehicular bridges and a foot bridge — closer to the southwest side of the lake, right beside the south car bridge.

Most of the streets in Chickasaw Gardens are named after different Native American tribes. Examples include Catawba Lane, Iroquois Road, Chickasaw Parkway, and Natchez Lane.

== History ==
Chickasaw Gardens is located on land that was originally part of the estate of Clarence Saunders, the Memphis inventor of the first self-service grocery store named 'Piggly Wiggly'. The Chickasaw Gardens lake was originally constructed as part of an elaborate garden with rustic bridges and a playhouse for Saunders' children. Saunders lost his fortune in 1923 during the stock market crash, and the estate was sold to developers.

A number of the houses in the neighborhood were designed by prominent Memphis architect George Mahan.

== Movies ==
The Firm, the 1993 film based on a John Grisham novel, has many scenes filmed in Memphis. The home used for the residence of the main characters is in a different neighborhood, Belle Meade.

21 Grams, which featured Sean Penn and Naomi Watts and was nominated for two Academy Awards, was partially shot in a Chickasaw Gardens house.
