= MJHS =

MJHS may refer to:

- Metropolitan Jewish Health System, a nonprofit known as "MJHS" in New York City, United States
- Maynard H. Jackson High School, Atlanta, Georgia, United States
- Memphis Jewish High School, Memphis, Tennessee, United States
- Mount Judea High School, Mount Judea, Arkansas, United States
- Mount Juliet High School, Mount Juliet, Tennessee, United States
