= Nene Thomas =

American artist

Nene Tina Thomas (born August 31, 1968) is an artist living in Oklahoma City, Oklahoma. She specialises in fantasy art, particularly faeries.

== Career ==
Her first professional job was in 1994 when, according to her website, the publisher Wizards of the Coast approached her to contribute art work to Magic: The Gathering.

Nene Thomas Illustrations Booth at the KC Renaissance Festival

Parting the Veil: The Art of Nene Thomas was published by Chimera Publishing in 2010.

She partnered with fantasy artist Cindy McClure to create the Emerald Enticement fantasy doll, which is part of her Enchanted Maidens of Dragon Lore collection.

Her husband Steven Plagman designs and cuts mats for her, and she provided chapter illustrations for a high fantasy novel that he wrote.

She creates resin fairies with translucent wings, including one called "Prelude in Blue".

She illustrated the card "Faerie Dragon" for the computer version of Magic: The Gathering.

== Conventions ==
She has been a guest of honor at RadCon, and was the Artist Guest of Honor at DemiCon and OryCon in 1999, and the Artist Guest of Honor at Conestoga 6 in 2002.

Thomas was the Artist Guest of Honor at the InCon science fiction and fantasy convention in Spokane, Washington in 2000. She was the Artist Guest of Honor at Windycon 37, a Chicago area SF conference, in 2010.

She was an artist guest of honor at MidSouthCon 29 in 2011, at the Memphis Hilton in Memphis.

Thomas was a guest of honor at ConQuesT 2015.

== Art collections ==
- Parting the Veil, (2005) ISBN 0-974461-29-6
