= Anshei Sphard Beth El Emeth Congregation =

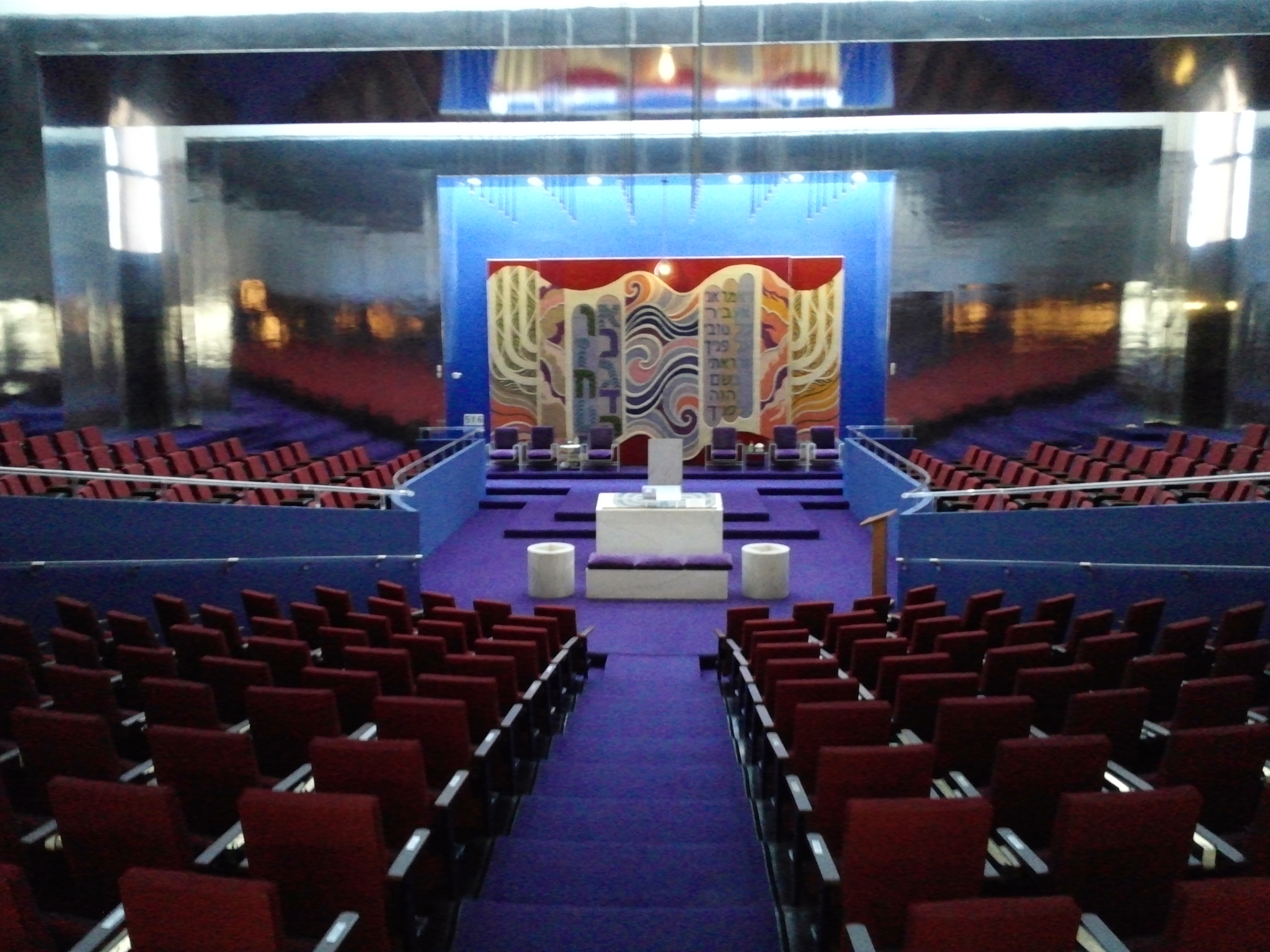
- Interior of Main Sanctuary of former Anshei Sphard Beth El Emeth synagogue

- Location in Tennessee

Religion
- Affiliation: Modern Orthodox Judaism (former)
- Rite: Ashkenazi
- Ecclesiastical or organisational status: Synagogue (former) (1966 – 2020)
- Leadership: Joel Finkelstein (last rabbi)
- Status: Closed and merged with Baron Hirsch Congregation

Location
- Location: 120 North East Yates Road, East Memphis, Tennessee 38120
- Country: United States
- Coordinates: 35°08′07″N 89°52′30″W

Architecture
- Established: 1966 (as a congregation): 1861 Beth El Emeth); 1893 (Anshei Sphard)
- Completed: 1970 (East Memphis)

Website
- asbee.org

Anshei Sphard Beth El Emeth Congregation, abbreviated as ASBEE, was a Modern Orthodox synagogue located at 120 North East Yates Road, in East Memphis, Tennessee, in the United States. Established in 1966, with a history dating from 1861, the congregation operated for over 160 years prior to its 2023 merger with the Baron Hirsch Congregation.

As of 2023, ASBEE is a charity fund the supports maintenance of its cemetery and other charitable causes.

== History ==
Anshei Sphard Beth El Emeth Congregation was formed by the 1966 merger of Anshei Sphard and Beth El Emeth, two Memphis Modern Orthodox congregations with 19th century roots.

=== Beth El Emeth ===
Beth El Emeth was formed in 1861 by a group of dissatisfied members from the B'nai Israel Congregation (now Temple Israel). These members objected to B'nai Israel's move toward Reform Judaism. Their new congregation, guided by Rabbi Jacob Peres, who had been B'nai Israel's first rabbi, was committed to maintaining the "minhag Polen" (traditions of the Polish Jews). In its initial years, the shul's leadership would prove to be less than stable. Its first religious leader was Chazan Elya Marcuson, whose stint would be quite brief. In 1863, Beth El Emeth got its first rabbi in Joel Alexander of Brooklyn, New York, who would only preside for three short years until his death in 1866. In the coming years, the rabbinate would be in flux.

By 1872, the shul had acquired a cemetery, which was located south of Central Avenue and north of Cane Creek, according to the Shelby County directory. In the mid-1870s, Ferdinand Leopold Sarner, a former chaplain in the Civil War, became the new rabbi.

The Yellow Fever epidemic in Memphis in the late 1870s would deliver a huge blow to the congregation, killing off Peres, Sarner, and much of its membership. In 1880, services were suspended, only to be continued the next year, according to the Shelby County directory. In 1882, the remaining members of the congregation engaged in talks with Bnai Israel in the hope of a merger. Bnai Israel decided that whereas they would not merge as a whole, they would accept members on an individual basis. Beginning in 1884, the congregation would no longer be listed in Shelby County directories. The cemetery would similarly vanish from directories in 1887.

In 1891, Beth El Emeth reappears in the directories on Poplar and Washington in Cochrane Hall. At the same time, there is another shul called Tiferes Israel in the Knights of Pythias Hall. It says in the directories that the reader for the Beth El Emeth was Moses Franklin. In 1893, the directories do not include Beth El Emeth, but it says that Tiferes Israel is located in Cochrane Hall and the reader is Moses Franklin. One can assume that the two congregations merged. The Tiferes Israel cemetery, acquired in 1891, was located on Pigeon Roost Road. The congregation disappears from directories in 1897, in the same year as the Baron Hirsch Congregation begins to appear. In 1898, the Baron Hirsch cemetery is located on Pigeon Roost Road. One can therefore assume that Tiferes Israel (Beth El Emeth) merged with Baron Hirsch, but it is not completely clear.

In 1916, B’nai Israel left its building on Poplar and a group of Orthodox Jews took over the facility, and called themselves Beth El Emeth. For whatever reason, Beth El Emeth does not appear in the directories until 1929. They remained there until 1957. It is unknown where these people who started this new Beth El Emeth came from; and if they were a continuation of the 1890s Beth El Emeth.

=== Anshei Sphard ===
Anshei Sphard was organized in 1893, chartered in 1904, and located in the Pinch district of Memphis until 1948. It was originally formed by a group of Polish Jews wishing to observe Sephardic traditions. Anshei Sphard purchased land for a cemetery in 1907.

=== Merger to form Anshei Sphard Beth El Emeth ===
By the 1960s, both congregations found themselves with declining membership as their constituencies progressively moved to the east. By 1966 they had agreed to merge, and in 1970 they opened their new facility in East Memphis.

The congregation is known for its annual Kosher barbecue competition, reportedly the first such Kosher competition in the world. The competition was established in 1988, after members of the congregation first sought to establish an event for Kosher-observant, non-pork-eating Jews as part of the city's large Memphis in May "World Championship Barbecue" contest. By 2011, the contest was attracting thousands of participants, including Halal-observant Muslims as well as Jews.

=== Merger with Baron Hirsch Congregation ===
In late 2020, the congregation, upon selling their building, moved services to the Baron Hirsch Congregation, where they rented space for an independent Shabbat morning service.

In early 2023, the congregation officially combined with Baron Hirsch, and a fund was established for charity and the continued maintenance of the Anshei Sphard and Beth El cemeteries.

== Gallery ==
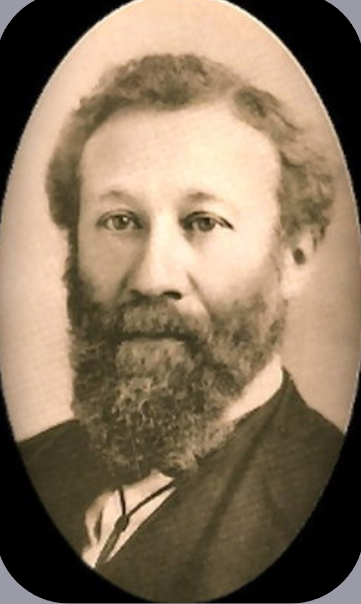
Jacob Peres, founder of Beth El Emeth in 1862.

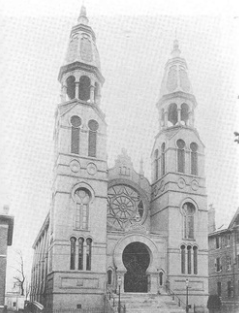
Beth El Emeth building from 1916 to 1957 on Poplar Ave.

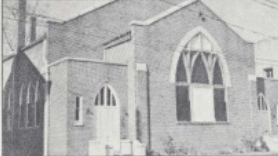
Anshei Sphard building from 1904 to 1948 on Market Street.

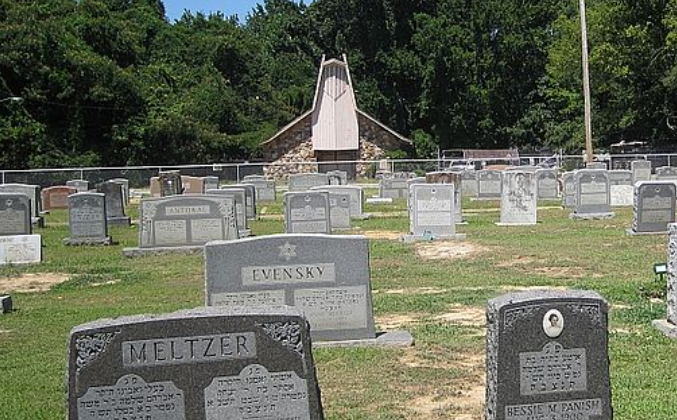
Current Beth El Emeth Cemetery on Horn Lake Rd, est. 1928.

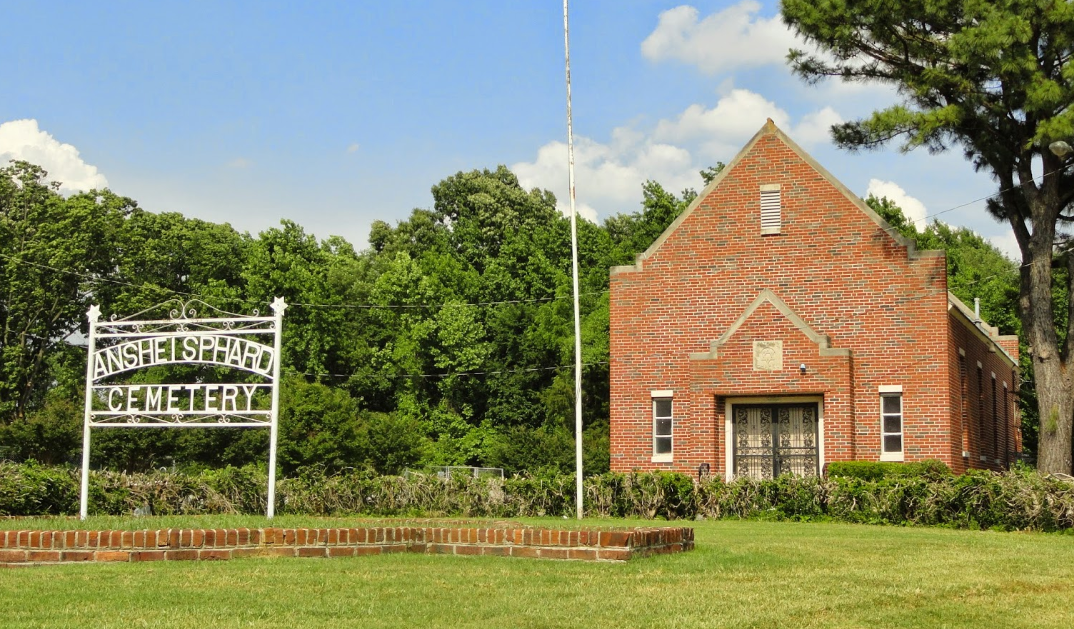
Current Anshei Sphard Cemetery on Airways Blvd, est. 1920.
