= RadCon =

Science fiction convention in Washington, US

- Status: Active
- Genre: Science Fiction
- Venue: Red Lion Hotel
- Locations: (Washington (state)) Pasco, Washington
- Country: United States
- Attendance: 2115 in 2013
- Website: http://www.radcon.org/

Created as the brain child of Edgar Lincoln and his wife Norma Barret-Lincoln with the help of friends, some of whom are still involved today, RadCon is a not-for-profit organization that promotes education in Science Fiction and Fantasy. Every February during President's Day weekend, RadCon hosts a weekend long convention at the Red Lion Hotel in Pasco, Washington.

== Highlights ==
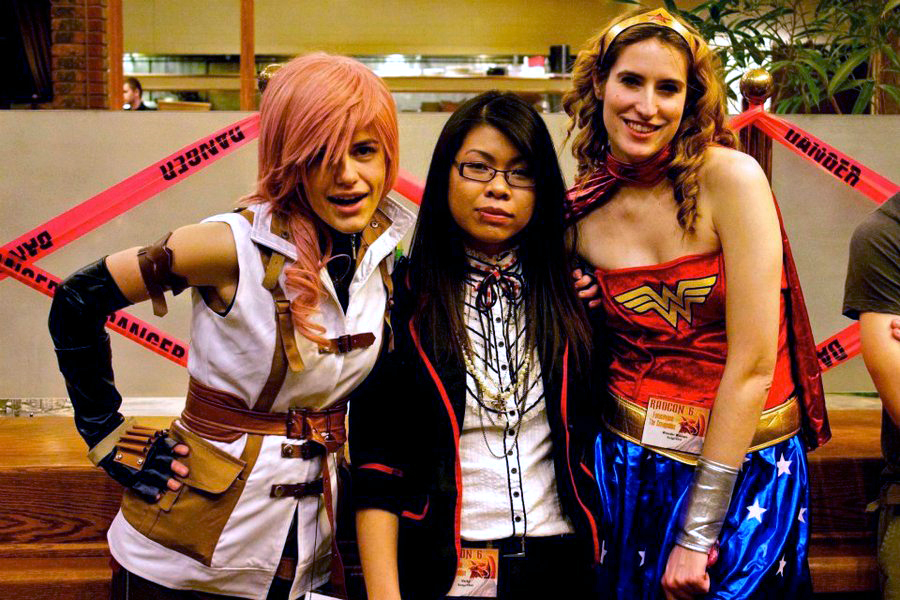
Cosplayers, Alaire Bowen, Victoria Suebsanh, and Dani pose for a photo shoot inside Red Lion Hotel in Pasco, WA for the February 2012 Radcon Convention.

RadCon hosts many events during the convention and promotes all aspects of science-fiction, including gaming, art, literature, films and science. Programming and panels consists of topics including art, writing, science, films, anime, costuming, and gaming. Events include an anime room, art show, general gaming, LAN gaming, a masquerade and room parties. The Region 5 summit is also held in conjunction with RadCon.

The 2009 guests of honor included artist Sarah Clemens, Joe Kucan (Kane), and Alma Alexander. Past guests from other years include Nene Thomas, Alexander James Adams, Alan Marshall Clark, Jeff Sturgeon, and Patricia Briggs. RadCon also boasts a large number of visiting professionals, including many Pacific Northwest authors and artists. 2011 Guests of Honor included Scientist Julie Avila, Fan Guest of Honor Dragon Dronet, Editor Guest of Honor Rachael Edidin, Artist Guest of Honor Jeff Fennel, Media Guest of Honor Sean Kennedy, Writer Guest of Honor Deborah J. Ross, Small Press Guest of Honor Book View Cafe and Special Guest of Honor, Matt Vancil. 2014 Guests of Honor include Writer GoH Mike Resnick, Artist Goh Howard Tayler, Music GoH The Great Luke Ski and Special Guests of honor Dragon Dronet and John Dalmas.

In February 2013, Thousands of sci-fi fans and geeks of all ages came to participate at RadCon. Events included games, an art gallery, panel discussions, jewelry designing, costume making, makeup painting, and more. Magic the Gathering was the game of choice among CCG collectors. As per usual RadCon hosts donated to Rivers of Ink and Cavalcade of Authors. Guests of Honor who attended were "...author Tanya Huff, author of the Blood urban fantasy vampire series that became the TV show Blood Ties; artist J.P. Targete, whose art has been featured on a number of book covers and in The Rising comic book; Scott Allie, editor-in-chief of Dark Horse Comics; and Dragon Dronet, a stuntman and choreographer who worked on The Scorpion King and Tim Burton's Planet of the Apes movie."

== Name and numbering ==
The name may have originated with a member of the initial concom who worked in Radiological Control, possibly at Pacific Northwest National Laboratory in Richland.

The unusual numbering convention (1, 1A, 1B, 1C, 2, 2A, ...) has to do with leap years. The first RadCon happened on February 28, 29, and March 1 of 1992. It is a yearly event, but its birthday is on leap day.
