= Huey's =

Burger restaurant chain in Tennessee, U.S.

- Interactive map of Huey's

Restaurant information
- Established: 1970
- Food type: American-style burgers, soups, and salads
- Employees: 450
- Website: hueyburger.com

Huey's is a chain of restaurants and bars located in Memphis, Tennessee. Founded in 1970 by Alan Gary, it has been voted "Best Burger" by Memphis Magazine every year since 1984. Huey's has also been voted "Best Pub Grub" and "Best Beer Selection" in Memphis Magazine's Readers Restaurant Poll. Famous for its "Huey Burger," the chain operates 10 locations spread across the city. After being founded by Alan Gary in 1970 as an attempt to "create a bar that was fun and unique," Huey's was purchased by Thomas Boggs in 1976. The company now operates under the corporate body Uncle Donald's Restaurant LLC, which is still run by the Boggs family.

== History ==
Huey's was founded by Alan Gary on April 26, 1970, based on the nickname Gary had when he was younger. In 1976, Thomas Boggs took over as CEO of the restaurant. Boggs' wife, Wight Boggs, served as a co-owner of the restaurant and continues to do so. Other co-owners include his children. They include:

- Ashley Boggs Robilio, President of Operations
- Lauren Boggs McHugh, CEO
- Fulton Boggs
- Alex Boggs, Marketing Director - Area Director
- Samantha Boggs Dean, Director of Community Engagement

Boggs was partner in several other successful Memphis restaurants including Folk's Folly, Tsunami, Molly's La Casita, and Half Shell.

Boggs died on May 5, 2008, at 63 years of age in his sleep. Huey's celebrated its 45th birthday on April 26, 2015, with a birthday party spanning from 2 pm to midnight. A portion of the proceeds from the event went to Restore Corps, an anti-human trafficking organization. Huey's has since celebrated its 55th anniversary on April 13, 2025 with a block party for all of Memphis with 6 concerts, kids zone, local food vendors and Huey Burgers everywhere. All proceeds went to the Church Health Center, longstanding Huey's charitable beneficiary. A character called the "prospector" was created for an advertisement in the late '70s and early '80s by the University of Memphis' then Tiger Rag, which is now known as The Daily Helmsman.

Customers, starting during Gary's tenure as manager, would shoot toothpicks out of their straws and into the ceilings. Boggs initially cleaned the toothpicks from the ceiling, but a customer suggested that he do a contest instead. Customers pay one dollar to guess how many toothpicks, and the proceeds go to benefit the Memphis Zoo. The contest has raised $70,000.

=== Menu ===
Huey's features different menu items, including burgers, fries, onion rings, tater tots, and others. Huey's menu originally had hamburgers and cheeseburgers as the only options. One of its current burgers is called the "World Famous Huey Burger." In October 2018, Huey's introduced a vegan burger option called the "Beyond Burger" in three locations, with a rollout to all locations in early November.

=== Locations ===
On May 8, 2017, Huey's opened a new location at the Shops of Millington Farms in Millington, Tennessee. As of 2023, there are ten locations.

There are things that can be found at all Huey's locations, including a crutch adhered to the ceiling. Graffiti can also be found at various locations on the walls inside the buildings and is redone every year.

=== Locations ===
- Millington- 8570 US-51, Millington, TN 38053
- Collierville- 2130 W Poplar Ave, Collierville, TN 38017,
- Cordova- 1771 N Germantown Pkwy, Cordova, TN 38016
- Downtown Memphis- 77 S 2nd St, Memphis, TN 38103
- Germantown- 7677 Farmington Blvd, Germantown, TN 38138
- Midtown Memphis- 1927 Madison Ave, Memphis, TN 38104
- East Memphis- 4872 Poplar Ave, Memphis, TN 38117
- Southaven- 7090 Malco Blvd, Southaven, MS 38671
- Southwind- 7825 Winchester Rd, Memphis, TN 38125
- Olive Branch- 8179 McGregor Crossing Suite 200, Olive Branch, MS 38654

== Reception ==
Since 1984, its burger had won "Best Burger" from Memphis Magazine every year. Kevin Alexander of Thrillist included Huey's and the "World Famous Huey Burger with Cheese" on his list of the best burgers in Memphis. He praised the balance of tastes in the burger while noting minor issues such as the bun being slightly dry. WMC Action News 5's Joe Birch meanwhile called the "World Famous Huey Burger" a great Memphis burger. Commercial Appeal editor Nicole R. Harris included Huey in her list of restaurants to visit in the Downtown Memphis area. Memphis Flyer staff featured Huey's burgers in a list of the most iconic Memphis burgers.

Readers of the Memphis Flyer voted for Huey's, among others, in their "Best of Memphis 2016" poll. Thrillist editor Meredith Heil called Memphis the "best food city" of Tennessee, citing Huey's as part of why.
