= MidSouthCon =

Fan convention in the Mid-Southern US

- Status: Active
- Genre: Fan convention
- Frequency: Annually
- Location: Mid-South
- Country: United States
- Inaugurated: 1982
- Attendance: 1300–2300
- Website: www.midsouthcon.org

MidSouthCon is an annual multi-day fan convention in the Mid-Southern United States.

== Background ==
MidSouthCon began in 1982. Run by Mid-South Science and Fictions Conventions Inc., the annual multi-day fan convention focuses on anime, comic books, fantasy media, films, medieval weaponry, role-playing games, and science fiction. The con's wide gamut of celebrated subjects has been recognized as one of its draws.

== Past events ==
=== 2000s ===
In 2004, MidSouthCon 22 and DeepSouthCon 42 were jointly held in Memphis, Tennessee that March 26–28; Amy H. Sturgis was a featured guest. 2007's MidSouthCon 25 was held at the Memphis Holiday Inn from March 23–25; tickets at the door were US$45 (equivalent to $69.87 in 2025), and featured guests included Terry Pratchett and Mark Waid. MidSouthCon 27 was held from March 21–22, 2009 at the Whispering Woods Conference Center in Olive Branch, Mississippi; both days cost $45 (equivalent to $67.53 in 2025), and featured guests included Vincent Di Fate, Stanton T. Friedman, Mike Resnick, and Ann VanderMeer.

=== 2010s ===
In 2010, MidSouthCon 28 hosted about 1300 attendees from March 12–14 at Whispering Woods. From March 25–27, 2011, MidSouthCon 29—at the Hilton Memphis—was expected to have 1500 attendees; tickets at the door sold for $45 (equivalent to $64.4 in 2025), and featured guests included Kurt Busiek, Monte Cook, Mary Robinette Kowal, and Nene Thomas. MidSouthCon 30 returned to the Hilton Memphis from March 22–25, 2012; Mark Goddard, Marta Kristen, Andy Looney, Ethan Siegel, and Michael A. Stackpole were among the featured guests, and the four-day event cost $45 (equivalent to $63.11 in 2025). In 2015, MidSouthCon 33 hosted 2146 attendees. MidSouthCon 34, held in 2016 from March 18–20 at the Hilton Memphis, featured Christie Golden, Bob McLeod, and Ethan Siegel as guests. At the Hilton Memphis from March 9–11, 2018's MidSouthCon 36 expected 2300 attendees alongside featured guests Mike Carlin, Ellen Datlow, and Mike Resnick; the three-day pass cost $55 (equivalent to $70.52 in 2025).

=== 2020s ===
MidSouthCon 39 was scheduled for March 22–24, 2024 at the Whispering Woods Hotel and Conference Center in Olive Branch, Mississippi; featured guests included Elizabeth Bear, Andy Looney, and Sheree Renée Thomas.

== Charity ==
At 2017's MidSouthCon 35, $10,000 (equivalent to $13,135 in 2025) was raised for Literacy Mid-South and the Science Fiction and Fantasy Writers of America's emergency medical fund.
