= Sherwood Forest, Memphis =

Neighborhood of Memphis, Tennessee

Coordinates: 35.1053°N 89.9532°W

Sherwood Forest is a neighborhood near the University District in eastern Memphis, Tennessee. It is located south of Normal Station and east of Orange Mound. Its boundaries are: Park Ave. (North), Rhodes Ave. (South), Getwell Rd. (East), S. Highland St., Radford Rd., and S. Prescott St (West). The neighborhood is home to the Sherwood Elementary and Middle Schools. Sherwood Forest is noted for having street names relating to the Robin Hood folklore including Robin Hood Lane, Maid Marion Lane, Friar Tuck Road, Little John Road, Nottingham Place, and Allandale Lane.

A number of streets are named after Southern California locations, or more specifically streets of Los Angeles. These include: Radford, Wilshire, Catalina, and the oft-mispronounced and alternatively spelled Vanuys.

The population of Sherwood Forest was 4,347 as of 2023 according to the U.S. Census Bureau 2019-2023 American Community Survey.
