= White Station, Memphis =

Neighborhood in Tennessee, United States

Coordinates: 35°06′07″N 89°51′35″W

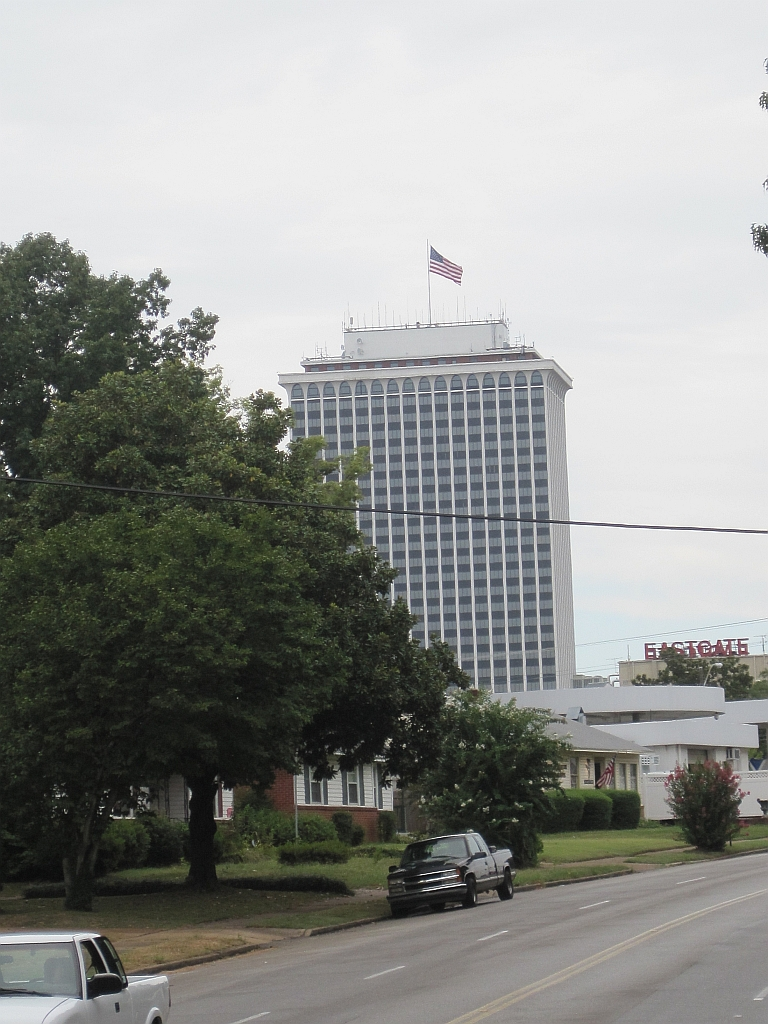
Clark Tower, a landmark in White Station.

White Station is a neighborhood in the east section of Memphis, Tennessee, United States, and is known for White Station High School.

== History ==
White Station was located near the former site of White's Station (namesake also of Whitehaven), an historic railway station built in 1842 on the LaGrange and Memphis Railroad (later part of the Memphis and Charleston Railroad), now part of the Norfolk Southern Railway. Until the 1950s White Station was near the eastern boundary of Memphis. Also during the 1950s, White Station was annexed into Memphis and became one of the main neighborhoods of East Memphis.

== Sources ==
- Encyclopædia Britannica Atlas, 1958 Edition, Plate 152.
- World book, 1967 edition, Vol. 18, p. 113.
