= Orange Mound, Memphis =

Neighborhood in Memphis, Tennessee, United States

Coordinates: 35.1078°N 89.9720°W

Orange Mound
- Neighborhood of Memphis
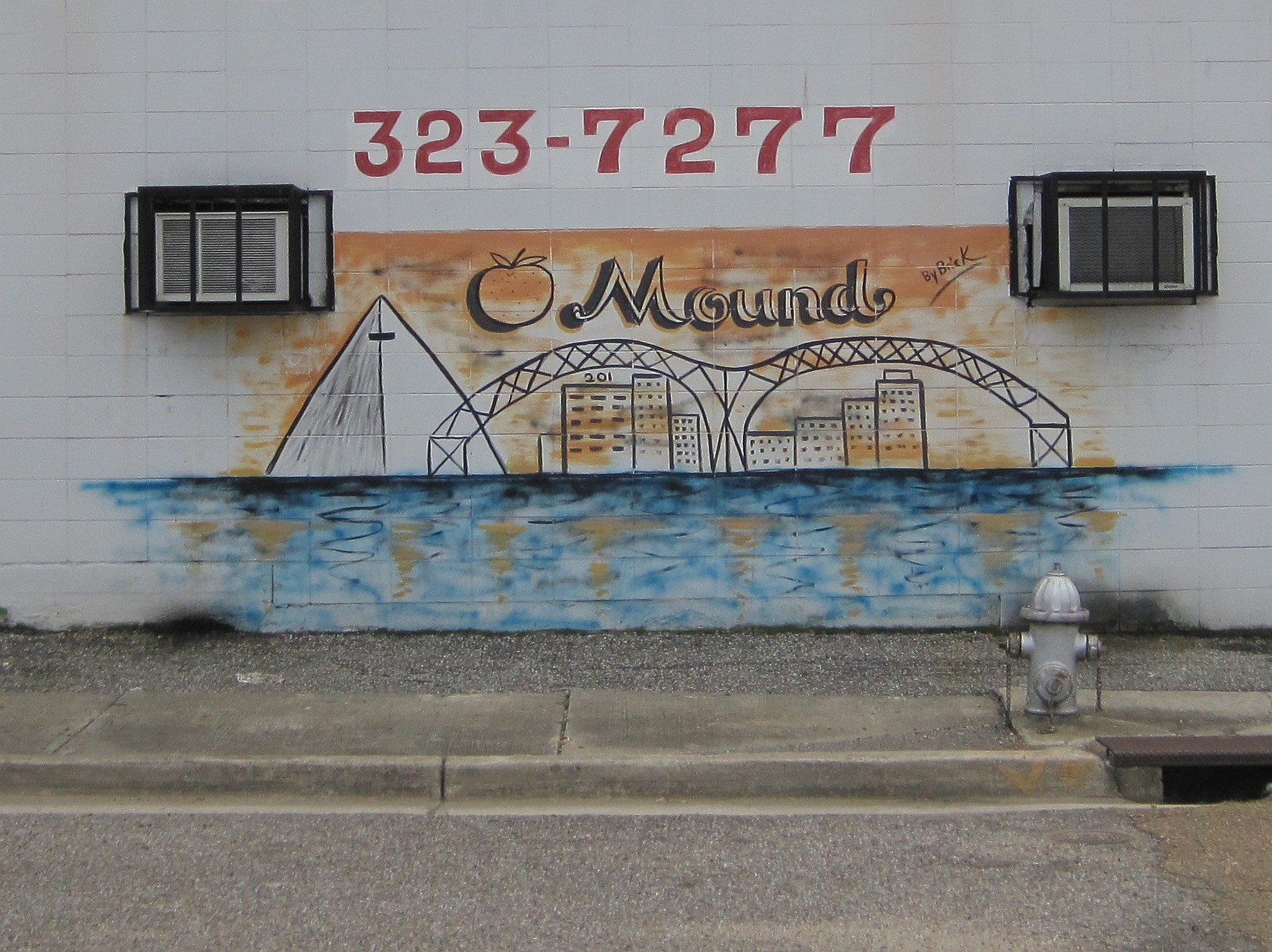
- O-Mound mural
- Interactive map of Orange Mound
- Country: United States
- State: Tennessee
- County: Shelby County
- City: Memphis
- ZIP Code: 38111, 38114

Orange Mound is a neighborhood in southeastern Memphis, Tennessee. It was the first US neighborhood to be built by African Americans.

Built on the grounds of the former Deaderick plantation, the Orange Mound subdivision was developed for African Americans in the 1890s to provide affordable land and residences for the less wealthy.

== Geography ==
Orange Mound is bounded by Semmes St. to the east, (bordering the University of Memphis district) and by Lamar and Kimball Avenues to the south. The Southern Avenue & Illinois Central Railroad tracks that cross in front of the Mid-South Coliseum form the northern & western borders while separating it from the Beltline and Midtown. The streets outlining the plantation that originally existed on that ground were Goodwyn St on the east, Park Ave on the south and Airways at the southwest.

== Demographics ==
The neighborhood has a population of approximately 14,400, of which 95 percent are of African-American heritage.

== History ==
=== Deaderick plantation - 1800s ===
Orange Mound stands on the site of the former John Deaderick plantation. Between 1825 and 1830, Deaderick (whose family donated the land in Nashville on which the Tennessee State Capitol was built) purchased 5,000 acres (20 km^{2}) of land (from Airways to Semmes) and built a stately house there (at what is now the east side of Airways, between Carnes and Spottswood). In 1890, a developer named Elzey Eugene Meachem purchased land from the Deaderick family and began developing a subdivision for African-Americans, selling lots for less than $100. In the 1890s, a typical Orange Mound house was a small, narrow "shotgun"-style house. A tradition says the name comes from mock-orange trees or shrubs on the grounds of the old homeplace.

=== Annexation ===
In 1919, The City of Memphis annexed the community.

=== Vibrant black community - 1970s ===
In the 1970s, Orange Mound was billed as "the largest concentration of blacks in the United States except for Harlem in New York City." The neighborhood provided a refuge for black people moving to the city for the first time from rural areas. Although the streets of the early Orange Mound were unpaved, it was a vibrant community in which a mix of residences, businesses, churches, and cultural centers flourished. During the era of desegregation, Orange Mound entered a period of decline as younger residents began to move away.

=== Drugs and crime - 1980s-1990s ===
Drugs and alcohol had been an issue for many years. Once crack entered the scene, the community was destroyed with violence and drug dealing. Drug use devastated poor and middle-class families. Since the 1990s, Orange Mound has improved considerably as crime has decreased due to the revitalization of the community.

=== Revitalization - 2000s ===
In the first decade of the 21st century, Orange Mound became the focus of a variety of revitalization efforts. One such effort, the Orange Mound Collaborative, funded by a Ford Foundation grant, stresses "education through empowerment." The Orange Mound Collaborative's projects include an Early Childhood Institute, and an oral history project in which researchers conduct videotaped interviews with Orange Mound's older residents.

In 2003, Orange Mound was named one of 21 areas in Memphis that were to be the focus of the S.M.A.R.T. Revitalization Plan ("Servicing the Metropolitan Area through the Redevelopment of Targeted neighborhoods"), a public-private partnership to create vibrant neighborhoods in declining areas.

In a 2004 editorial in the Memphis Commercial Appeal, Robert Lipscomb, director of Memphis's Housing and Community Development division, wrote that much progress had been made in revitalizing Orange Mound, through a combination of code enforcement, tenant education programs, and neighborhood cleanup efforts.

In the fall of 2009, Melrose High School opened its renovated stadium.

A group called the Mid-South Peace & Justice Center helped neighborhood residents to create the Orange Mound Community Garden. Organizers of the garden project hope the project will help beautify the community, provide a source of nutritious food, teach leadership skills, and encourage self-reliance.

In 2021, Victoria Jones, a local arts organizer, and IMAKEMADBEATS, a local music producer announced plans to develop the United Equipment Building, an abandoned feed mill in Orange Mound. The proposed $50 million development is for the building to become a multi-use facility called the Orange Mound Tower.

== Culture ==
=== Churches ===
Churches in Orange Mound, and throughout Memphis, have played a critical role in developing community leaders and fostering stability. Particularly important has been Mount Moriah Missionary Baptist Church, which has been at the corner of Carnes Avenue and David St. since 1926, and Mt Pisgah CME Church on the corner of Park Avenue and Marechalneil. This church played a role in the Civil Rights Movement by assisting activists jailed for their activities in support of racial equality.

=== Music ===
Orange Mound hosts a growing underground rap scene as well as national hip-hop stars. The hit rap duo 8 Ball & MJG (Premro Smith and Marlon Jermain Goodwin) grew up in Orange Mound. They met at Ridgeway High in East Memphis, where many Orange Mound children were educated from the early 1970s to the early 1990s.

=== Literature ===
Orange Mound is the title and setting of a novel written by author Jay Fingers, who grew up in the neighborhood. The novel was recently deemed a "Memphis Book for Summer Reading" by the Memphis Flyer.

=== Education ===
Melrose High School and Dunbar Elementary School are located in Orange Mound and serve as sources of pride and focal points for the community. On Fridays during football season, members of the community come together to cheer on the Golden Wildcats at Melrose Stadium.

=== Key to Orange Mound ===
Tyler Glover, who operated "Tyler's Place" restaurant formerly at 2481 Park Avenue, was colloquially known as the "Mayor of Orange Mound," and his restaurant the official Orange Mound "city hall." During the first term of Memphis Mayor W. W. Herenton, Glover presented Herenton with an orange "key to Orange Mound." Glover's words convey the love that Orange Mound's long-term residents feel for Orange Mound: "This is the greatest community in the world.... It is the greatest community because I know everybody here and I love working on committees and making this a better place in which to live. I don't want to live any other place than Orange Mound. I have had numerous opportunities to move someplace else, but there is no other place in the world I want to live, but Orange Mound, Tenn." In 2007 during Glover's incapacity, Orange Mound anointed Melrose Veteran and Hall of famer Jason Smith as Glover's successor.

Tyler Glover died in September, 2019.
