= Hilton Memphis =

Hilton skyscraper hotel in Memphis, Tennessee

Coordinates: 35°06′19″N 89°52′05″W

- Hilton Memphis in June 2026
- Interactive map of the Hilton Memphis area
- Hotel chain: Hilton

General information
- Location: United States, 939 Ridge Lake Blvd. Memphis, Tennessee
- Opening: September 15, 1975
- Owner: Linchris Hotel Corporation
- Operator: Hilton Hotels

Height
- Height: 329 ft (100 m)

Technical details
- Floor count: 27

Design and construction
- Architect: Francis Mah

The Hilton Memphis is the tallest hotel in Memphis, Tennessee, United States.

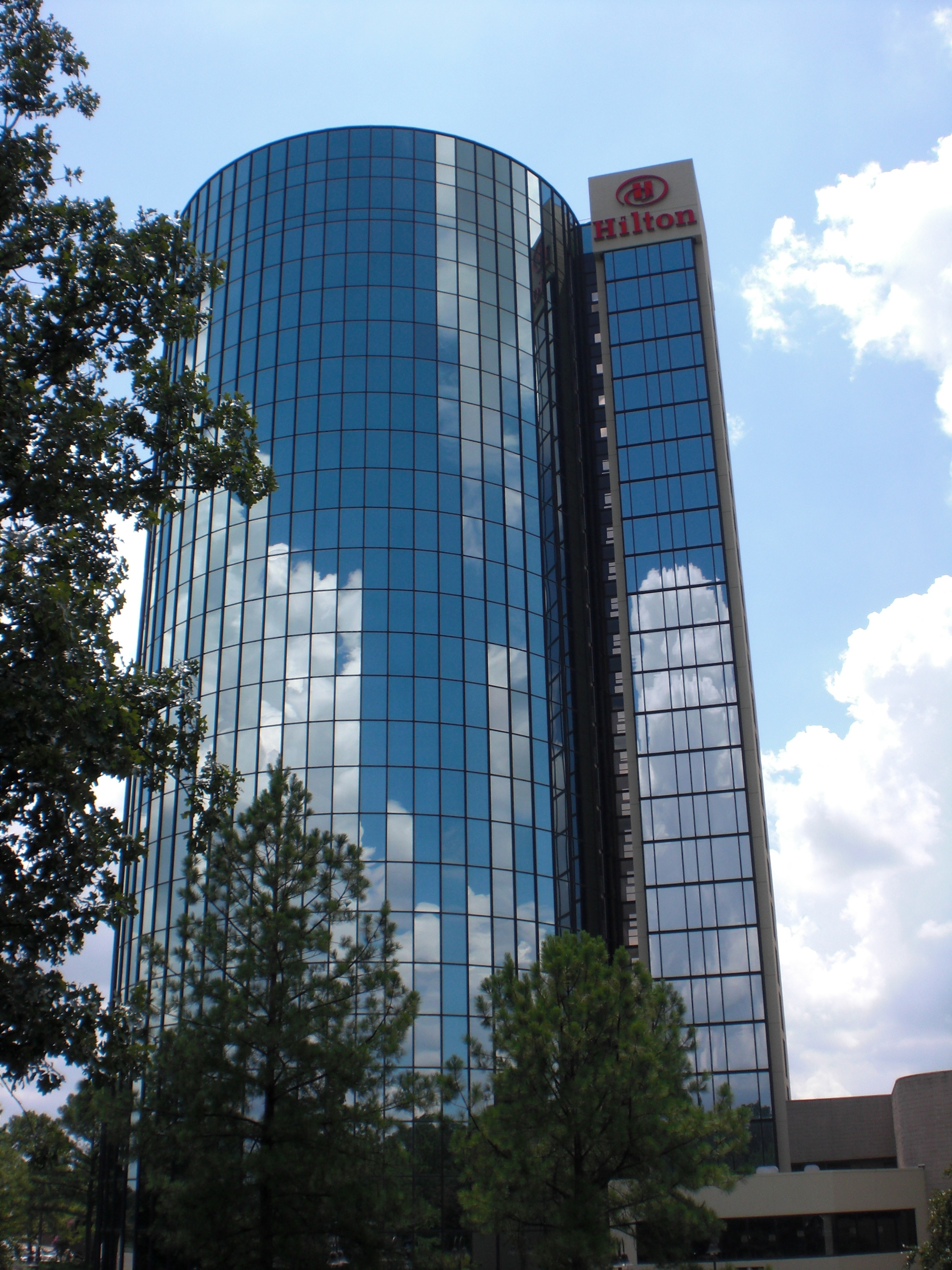
The Hilton Memphis with previous signage in July 2010.

Located off Interstate 240 in East Memphis. the 27-story hotel was designed by Hawaiian-born Memphis architect Francis Mah and was built by Boyle Investment. Originally opened on September 15, 1975 as the Hyatt Regency Memphis, the hotel became the Omni Memphis Hotel in December 1989. Just over two years later, it was sold to Adam's Mark Hotels and became the Adam's Mark Memphis in May, 1992. It was sold again to Wilton D. "Chick" Hill, a Memphis investor, and Crow Holdings of Dallas on April 1, 2003. The hotel was managed by Hill's Davidson Hotel Co. It was briefly renamed the Park Vista Memphis Hotel while it underwent a $12 million renovation to bring it up to Hilton brand standards, before Hilton Hotels assumed management in 2004. The Hilton was sold again to RockBridge Partners and Davidson Hotel Co. on May 14, 2007 for $45 million.

The hotel is known for being a convention hotel; both MidSouthCon in 2011 and Airliners International in 2012 were held there. The hotel has a gift shop, outdoor pool and whirlpool, and restaurant. It is commonly used by politicians on election nights, and is known as where Lisa Marie Presley stayed when she visited Memphis.
