= Columbian Park Zoo =

Zoo in Indiana, United States

- Interactive map of Columbian Park Zoo
- 40.4141335°N 86.8709012°W
- Date opened: 1908
- Location: Lafayette, Indiana, United States
- No. of animals: 190
- Public transit: CityBus
- Website: www.columbianparkzoo.org

The Columbian Park Zoo is a seasonal zoo located in Lafayette, Indiana, at Columbian Park. The zoo is home to more than 190 animals from over 90 species. The zoo is in Columbian Park, which also includes playgrounds, picnic areas, a walking trail, and a baseball stadium.

== History ==
The Columbian Park Zoo was founded in 1908 and originally contained foxes, skunks, pelicans, deer, lynx, prairie dogs, and a wolf. Improvements to the zoo were made in 1928, when the main animal house was constructed and the zoo purchased an elephant with funds raised by local school students. During the 1930s, the zoo began to breed animals to share with other small zoos, and in 1943 added lions, monkeys, elk, zebras, bears, and alligators.

In 2004, Lafayette Parks & Recreation developed a master plan for the zoo. This plan called for more naturalized exhibits, a discovery center, and the return of the Columbian Park Carousel. The zoo reopened on June 30, 2007, with the improvements outlined in the master plan.

== Exhibits ==
The zoo houses more than 190 animals from 90 different species.

== Education ==
The Columbian Park Zoo offers education programs for children from preschool through college. For preschool children, the zoo offers a program called Zoo Pajama Party designed for children's ages one to five. The program is held once a month and children are encouraged to dress in their pajamas for 45 minutes of bedtime story readings, activities and an animal encounter. The zoo also offers the Zoo Sprouts for children ages three to four which is designed to allow children to get closer to animals and actually touch them while learning different facts about each one. Additional programs are available for school-aged children in the form of weekend classes, workshops and summer camps.

The zoo offers a Zoo Teen program for children ages fourteen to seventeen where they can participate and learn how a zoo operates. The program is structured as a volunteer program and students are expected to attend training sessions and then work scheduled shifts throughout the summer months. The zoo also offers field trips for schools through the zoo's educational department.

The zoo also offers internships for current college students and recent graduates. Internships include service areas of animal care, marketing, animal enrichment, education, and horticulture. The zoo is also aided by the EPICS project from Purdue University, which designs, builds, and maintains engineering projects to aid the zoo.

== Funding ==
The Lafayette Parks Foundation supports the zoo and helps to raise money for the zoo. The zoo also raises funds through the selling of brick pavers which are used throughout the zoo. The zoo also obtains revenue from animal sponsorships and memberships, which allow additional benefits for those who hold them.
