= Speedway Terrace Historic District =

Historic district in Tennessee, United States

- U.S. National Register of Historic Places
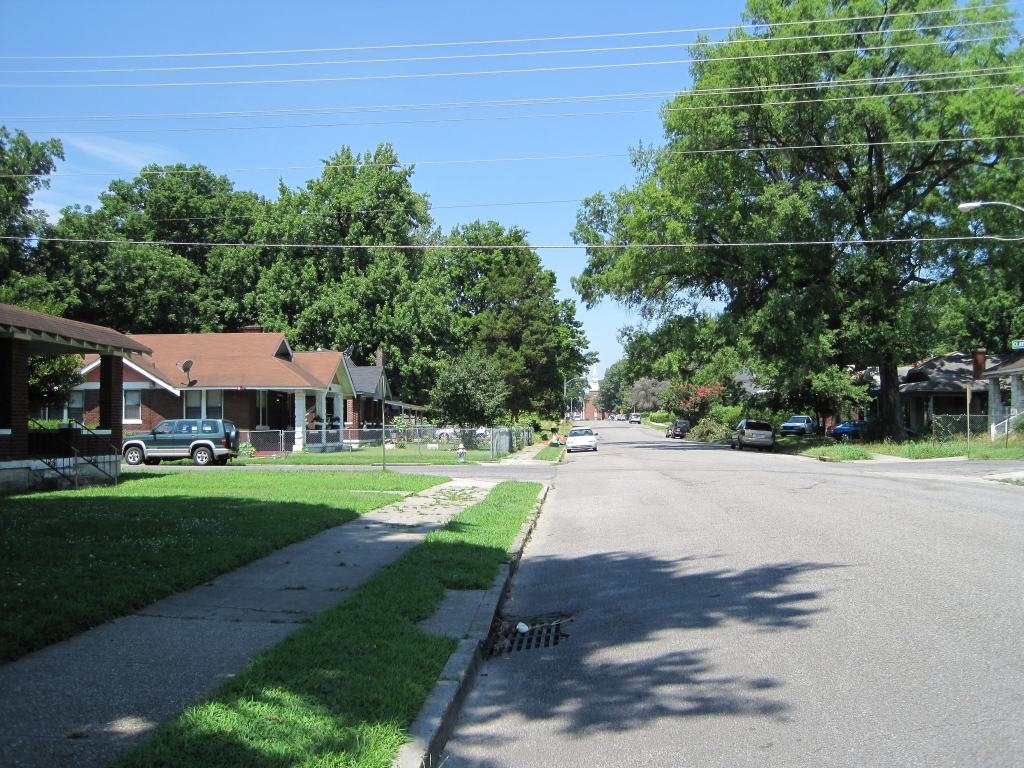

- Location within Tennessee Location within the United States
- Location: Roughly bounded by N. Watkins, Snowden, N. Bellevue, and Forrest Ave., Memphis, Tennessee
- Coordinates: 35°09′23″N 90°01′04″W
- Area: 110 acres (45 ha)
- Built by: William Chandler, others
- Architectural style: Colonial Revival, Bungalow/craftsman, shotgun
- MPS: Residential Resources of Memphis MPS
- NRHP reference No.: 99000280
- Added to NRHP: March 19, 1999

The Speedway Terrace Historic District, in Memphis, Tennessee, is a residential historic district which was listed on the National Register of Historic Places in 1999. It included 492 structures, 330 of which are principal structures that contribute to the significance of the 110-acre (45 ha) district and were built during an approximate 40-year period beginning around 1905.

It includes a concentration of modified shotgun houses as well as other house types, decorated with elements of Colonial Revival and other architectural styles.

The district is roughly bounded by N. Watkins, Snowden, N. Bellevue, and Forrest Ave. in Memphis.

It includes a group of 22 similar bungalow houses developed from around 1922 on by William Cullen Chandler at 1189 to 1285 Forest Avenue. This is the largest concentration of houses by a single developer, other groups are much smaller in number. There were a small number of floor plans and the house had some individual detailing to minimize clear repetition. They all had middle-class amenities such as hardwood floors, concrete driveways, built-in cabinets. These "Built-Rite" bungalows set a standard for quality in the district and were emulated by other builders.
