= Normal Station, Memphis =

- Normal Station Historic District
- U.S. National Register of Historic Places
- U.S. Historic district
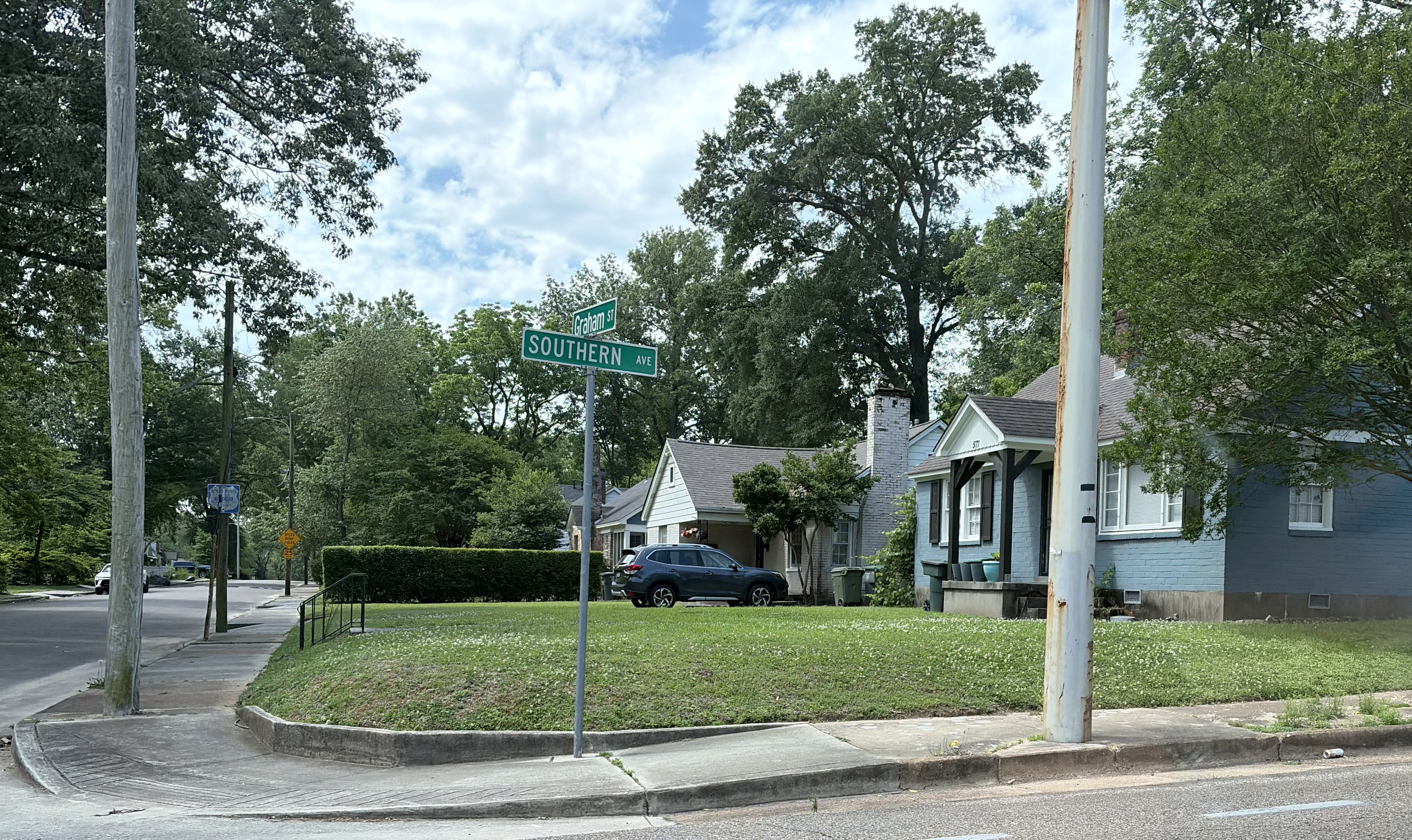
- Houses in Normal Station at Southern Avenue and Graham Street

- Location within Tennessee Location within the United States
- Location: Roughly bounded by Highland, Goodlett, Southern RR, and rear property lines of Marion and parcels on Park, Memphis, Tennessee
- Coordinates: 35°5′49″N 89°55′57″W
- Area: 390 acres (160 ha)
- Architect: Goodwin, John; Johnson, Wallace, et al.
- Architectural style: Colonial Revival, Bungalow/Craftsman, et al.
- MPS: Memphis MPSMemphis MPSMemphis MPS
- NRHP reference No.: 05000866
- Added to NRHP: August 10, 2005

Normal Station is a neighborhood in East Memphis, Tennessee, anchored by the University of Memphis, formerly Memphis State University, and originally called West Tennessee State Normal School. It is bordered by the University of Memphis to the north, Audubon Park to the east, Park Avenue and the Sherwood Forest neighborhood to the south, and Highland Street to the west.

== History ==
Until the early 20th century, the neighborhood was part of an area known as the Eckles Tract. In 1911, construction of the new West Tennessee State Normal School (now the University of Memphis) began in the neighborhood. To serve the construction, the Southern Railroad built a stub track northward from its main line. A streetcar line was extended eastward to serve the site. When the school opened in 1912, the railroad converted the terminus of its stub line into an official stop and built a waiting station in front of the school, near what is now the intersection of Highland Street and Southern Avenue, to serve passengers using the railroad and the streetcars. The neighborhood took on the name of the railway station, Normal Station.

It was common in the outlying areas around Memphis for neighborhoods and small towns to get their names from land owners, landmarks and railway stations. The custom is also seen today in areas such as Buntyn Station, White Station, and Bray Station.

The Normal railway station closed in 1949 and was demolished the following year.

== Campus neighborhood ==
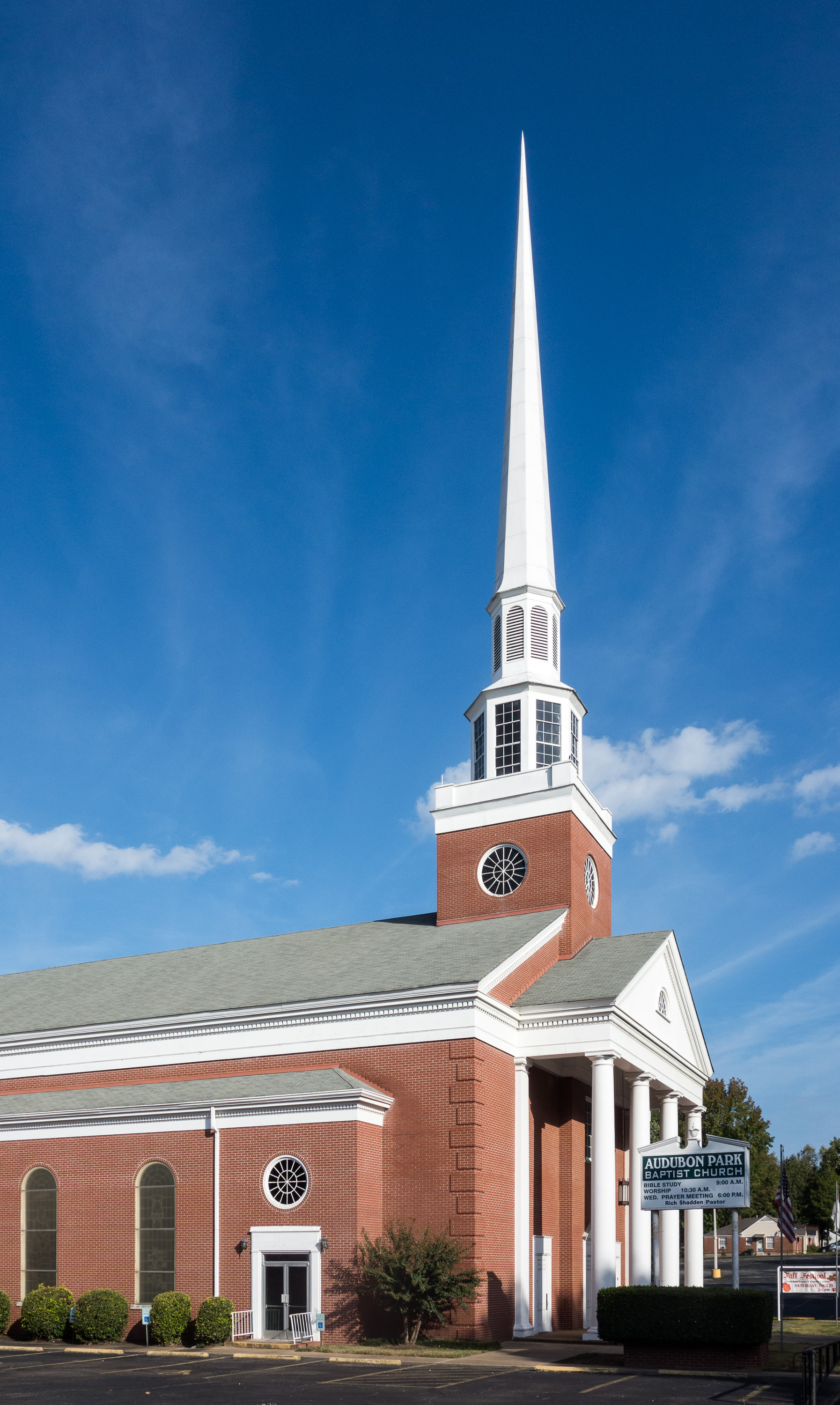
Park Avenue Church (formerly Audubon Park Baptist Church) is part of the Normal Station neighborhood but not a contributing property to the historic district.

The athletic department, student fitness center, and south parking lots of the University of Memphis are located in this neighborhood. Because of the proximity to the University, a large proportion of the neighborhood population are students and faculty. Most of the homes in this neighborhood are one-story single-family homes and duplexes built after World War II, but there are small apartment complexes and some larger, older homes interspersed within. The neighborhood's ZIP code is 38111.

== The Highland Strip ==
The Highland strip is the restaurant and shopping hub in the Normal station neighborhood. It is situated on the western border of the neighborhood. There is live music regularly at Rooster’s Blues House. This is a local gathering place for many U of M students.
