= High Point Terrace, Memphis =

Coordinates: 35.140°N 89.9386°W

- High Point Terrace Historic District
- U.S. National Register of Historic Places
- U.S. Historic district
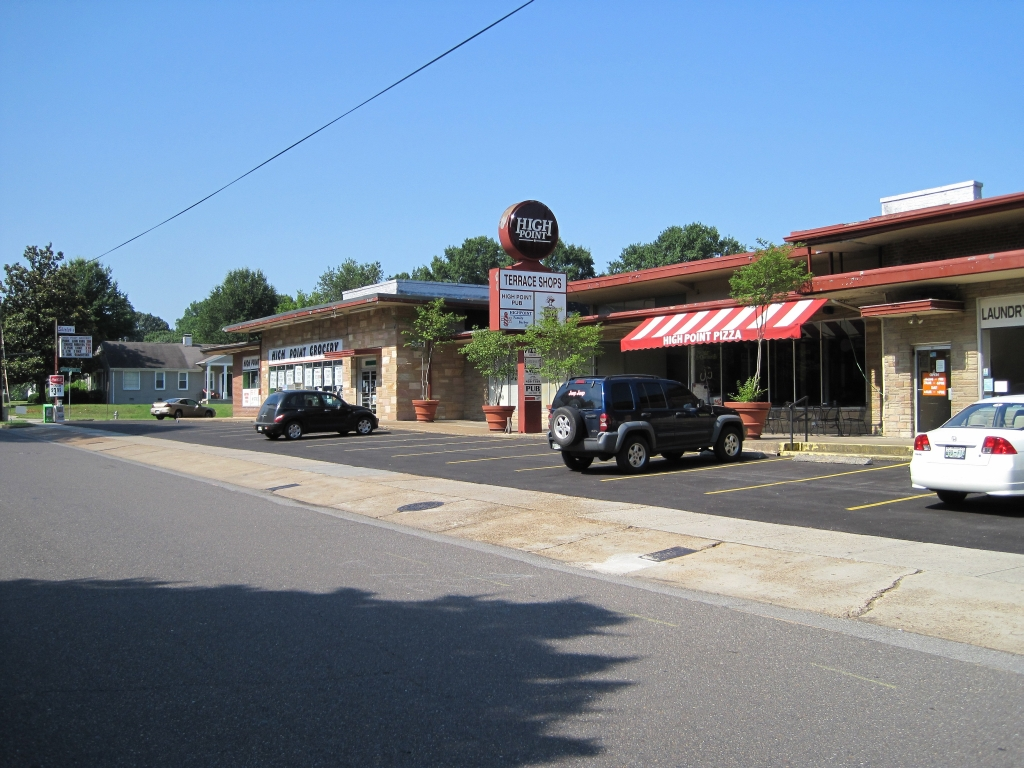
- High Point Terrace Shops

- Location within Tennessee Location within the United States
- Location: Memphis, Tennessee
- Area: 480 acres (1.9 km^{2})
- Architect: J. Frazier Smith, Charles K. Chandler
- Architectural style: Late 19th and 20th Century Revivals
- MPS: Residential Resources of Memphis MPS
- NRHP reference No.: 02001513
- Added to NRHP: December 12, 2002

High Point Terrace is a neighborhood located in the heart of the city of Memphis, Tennessee. The High Point Terrace Historic District is listed on the National Register of Historic Places.

== Geography ==
High Point Terrace is generally geographically defined as being located north of Walnut Grove Road, east of North Highland Street, south of Summer Avenue and bounded on the east by North Graham Street. Sam Cooper Boulevard, a local freeway, cuts the northern section off from the rest of the neighborhood. High Point gets its name from the railroad industry because, when the railroad that cut through the neighborhood was active, it was the highest point between the Mississippi River (to the west) and the Wolf River (to the east). Several years ago the rail bed was converted into the Shelby Farms Greenline, a popular paved exercise trail for non-motorized traffic.

== Community ==
The main thoroughfare extending North from Walnut Grove across Sam Cooper Blvd. to Summer Ave.,(also called High Point Terrace) is several blocks long and contains a small shopping area with a grocery store, family dental office, dry cleaners, pizza shop, barber shop, Deli/Cafe, pub and a few other businesses. Property values in High Point Terrace are some of the highest per square foot in the city of Memphis. There are approximately 4,000 residents and 1,800 homes (most of which are examples of early post-World War II minimal traditional design) in the area.

== History ==
Development in this part of Memphis began around 1900, though very little was developed. The next major development during the early 1940s, but World War II halted development for several years. The whole neighborhood was completed by 1953. The construction of Sam Cooper Boulevard (which was originally to be I-40) destroyed many of the original homes built at the turn of the century. The High Point Terrace Historic District, which includes 1180 contributing buildings over 480 acres (1.9 km^{2}), was added in 2002 to the National Register of Historic Places (NRHP). The NRHP is the United States federal government's official list of districts, sites, buildings, structures, and objects deemed worthy of preservation for their historical significance. A property listed in the National Register, or located within a National Register Historic District, may qualify for tax incentives derived from the total value of expenses incurred preserving the property. The neighborhood has a literary connection: In the late 1950s the great American playwright Tennessee Williams wrote the play "Period of Adjustment", which is subtitled "High Point is Built on a Cavern". The play premiered on Broadway in 1960 and was made into a major motion picture in 1962. (It is well-known that Williams had many Memphis connections, and IMDB lists the movie setting as "High Point, Tennessee".)
