= Memphis Jewish High School =

Coordinates: 35.0985°N 89.8606°W

Memphis Jewish High School (also known as Kadima Memphis Jewish High School) was a Modern Orthodox Jewish school in Memphis, Tennessee. It opened in 2006 and closed in 2010.
