= Oak Court Mall =

Defunct mall in Memphis, Tennessee, U.S.

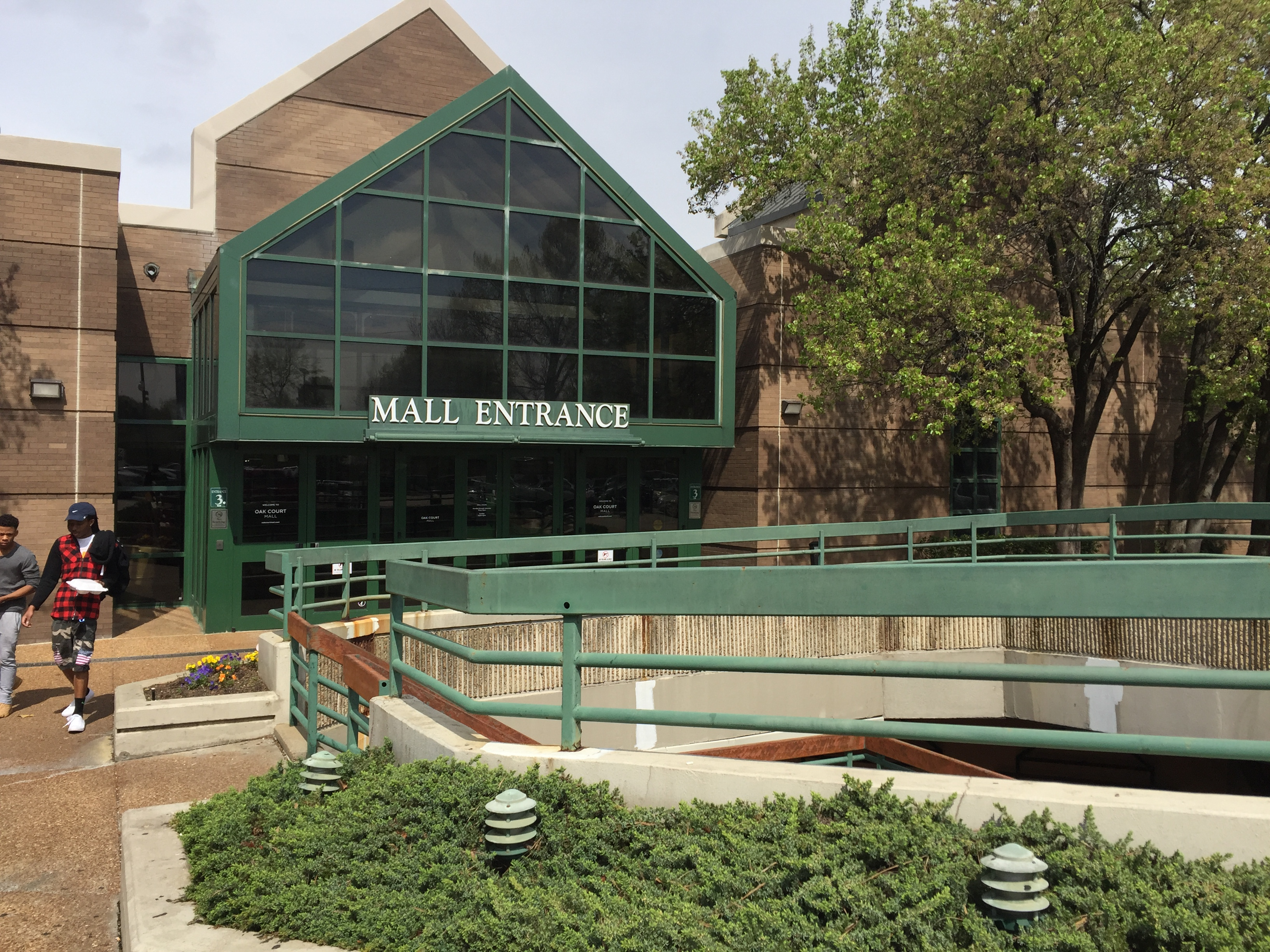
- Entrance to Oak Court Mall
- Location: Memphis, Tennessee, United States
- Coordinates: 35°7′1.4″N 89°54′46.8″W
- Address: 4465 Poplar Avenue
- Opened: 1988
- Closed: April 20, 2026
- Developer: Belz Enterprises
- Manager: JLL Properties
- Owner: Poag Development Group
- Num. of stores: 85
- Num. of anchor tenants: 3 (1 open, 2 vacant)
- Floor area: 850,000 square feet (79,000 m^{2}) (GLA)
- Floors: 2 (3 in Macy's)
- Parking: 3000 spaces
- Public transit: MATA
- Website: oakcourtmall.com

Oak Court Mall was an enclosed shopping mall located in Memphis, Tennessee, United States. Opened in 1988, the mall featured Dillard's and Macy's as its anchor stores.

== History ==
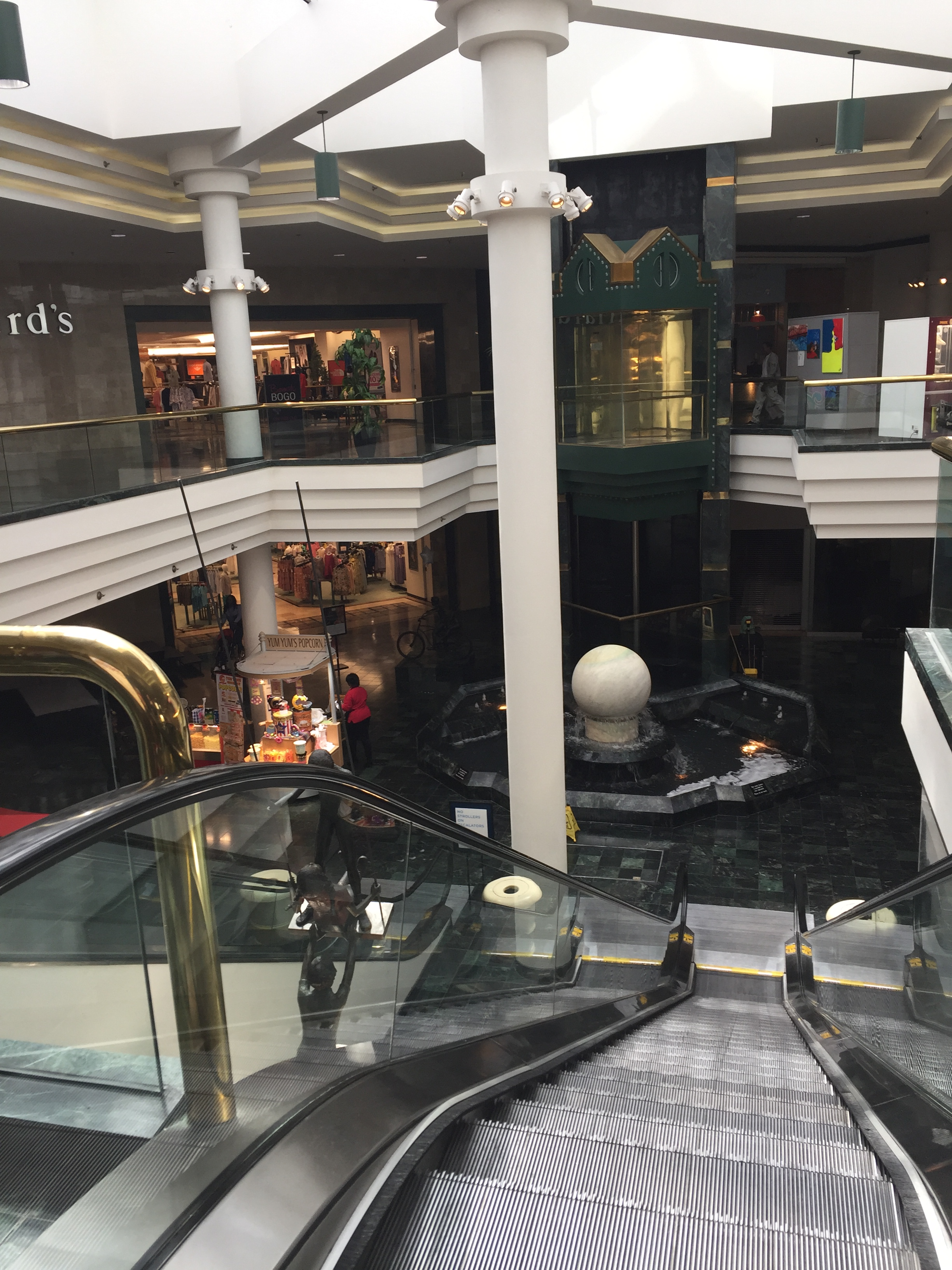
Interior of Oak Court Mall

The mall began as a freestanding, 3-story Goldsmith's, a Memphis-based department store, in 1961. In the early 1970s, Goldsmith's constructed a 3-story structure immediately to the west of the existing store. The upper two levels of this structure served as parking, while the bottom level was connected to the first floor of the existing store and served as additional retail space. In the late 1970s, Goldsmith's once again expanded with an addition of the original building to the north. This addition contained 2 floors of above ground retail space with an expansion of the basement and addition of an underground parking garage. A portion of this expansion was converted to Goldsmith's Furniture Gallery in the late 1980s when the rest of the mall was built.

In 1986, Belz Enterprises began construction on the mall immediately to the west of Goldsmith's. The first floor of the mall was constructed below ground while the second floor was at ground level. The mall opened in 1988 with the anchors of Lord & Taylor and Goldsmith's.

Lord & Taylor closed its store in 1992. The former Lord & Taylor store became Dillards, which was formerly located in Poplar Plaza. In 1995, Dillards built a store expansion in the center court of the mall for the men's and children's store while the existing Dillards on the west end of the mall became the women's store.

In 2005, Federated Department Stores rebranded all of the Goldsmith's locations as Macy's.

This mall was home to the first Starbucks location in the state of Tennessee. The shop was closed in 2013 and relocated to the second level of Macy's. As of 2021 the mall hired The Woodmont Company to manage the property. Dillard's has also closed their separate men's and children's store in the center court of the mall as of 2021. As of 2024 Poag Development Group now manages the property.

On January 9, 2025, it was announced that Macy's would be closing as part of a plan to close 66 stores nationwide. The store closed in March 2025, leaving Dillard's as the only anchor.

It was announced on April 28, 2025 that Oak Court Mall would be closed and demolished. Macy's was demolished in February 2026, with the rest of the mall to be demolished later in 2026. Poag has not stated what will be in its place but did stated that the Dillard's and office park portion of the property would remain intact.

The mall closed on April 20, 2026 to continue redevelopment of the site. Dillard's, the office building, and the bank remained open for business.
