= Belle Meade, Memphis =

Neighborhood in Memphis, Tennessee

Coordinates: 35.1275°N 89.9186°W

Belle Meade is an upscale neighborhood in Memphis, Tennessee. Belle Meade is bordered by Goodlett Street in the west, Walnut Grove Road at the north, Poplar Avenue at the south, and roughly East Cherry Circle on the east.

The 1993 film The Firm used a house in this neighborhood as the main home in the film.
