= Culture of Memphis, Tennessee =

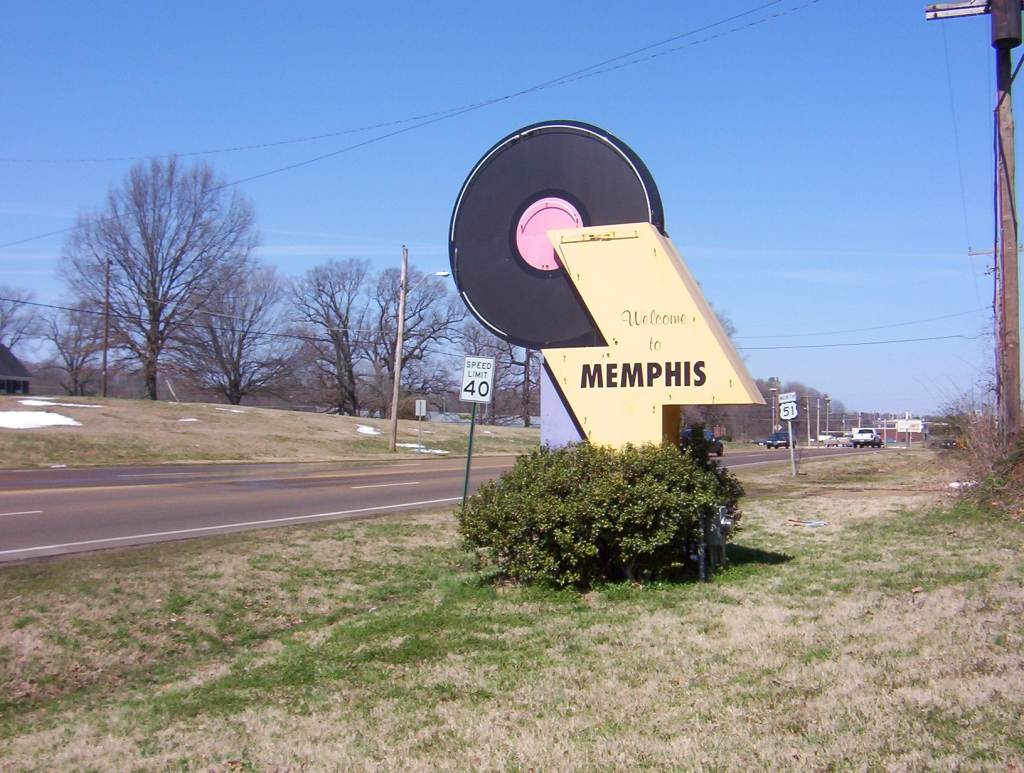
"Welcome to Memphis" sign on U.S. Route 51 (2008)

Memphis, Tennessee has a long history of distinctive contributions to the culture of the American South and beyond. Although it is an important part of the culture of Tennessee, the history, arts, and cuisine of Memphis are more closely associated with the culture of the Deep South (particularly the Mississippi Delta) than the rest of the state. For example, the city's influence on 20th-century music has had worldwide impact. Memphians have had an important role in founding or establishing several important American music genres, including blues, gospel, rock and roll, and "sharecropper" country music.

As of the American Community Survey of 2011, there were 652,050 people, 245,836 households, and 141,199 families residing in the city. In 2012, the Memphis Metropolitan Statistical Area (MSA) was the 41st largest in the United States, with a population of 1,341,690.

Memphis in May is an annual, month-long festival that promotes many aspects of Memphis' cultural heritage. Each year a different nation is partnered as a theme of the festival. Once the featured nation is announced, there is an open call for poster design, and the selected official festival poster becomes a treasured collectible, prestigious for the collector and the artist/creator. In 2011, 250,000 people attended the festival.

Memphis has long been home to persons of many different faiths. An 1870 map of Memphis shows religious buildings of the Baptist, Catholic, Episcopal, Methodist, Presbyterian, Congregational, and Christian denominations and a Jewish congregation.

Memphis is frequently noted as an affordable place to live.

== Demographics ==
As of the census of 2011, there were 652,078 people and 245,836 households in the city. The population density was 1,881.3 people per sq mi (726.4/km) spread over 294,145 housing units. The average household size was 2.59 and the home ownership rate was 49.3%. Of Memphians, 78.91% have lived at the same house for at least one year.

The racial makeup of the city was 62.4% African American, 29.6% White, 2.0% Asian, 0.2% Native American, 4.0% from other races, and 1.8% from two or more races. Hispanic or Latino of any race were 7.3% of the population.

Foreign born persons composed 6.6% of the population. Ethnically, Memphis' population consists of a variety of immigrant groups. In addition to a sizable Hispanic (mainly Mexican-American) population, major ethnic backgrounds include Chinese, Vietnamese, Russian, and Persian. Historically, many residents identify themselves with African, English, Irish, Italian and German ancestry. Memphis is also home to a large Jewish community of 9,000, most of whom are Ashkenazi Jews with Central and Eastern European ancestry.

Twenty-five percent of Memphis' population is under the age of 18, 10.4% are 65 years of age or older. Children under the age of 5 are 7.6% of the city's population. Women made up 52.4% of the population. The median income for a household in 2011 was $34,960 and the mean household income was $51,105 in the City of Memphis. Of the population 27.2% and 22.6% of families were below the poverty line in 2011.

=== Metropolitan area ===
The Memphis Metropolitan Statistical Area (MSA), the 41st largest in the United States, has a 2012 population of 1,341,690, and includes the Tennessee counties of Shelby, Tipton, and Fayette, as well as the Mississippi counties of DeSoto, Marshall, Tate, and Tunica, and the Arkansas county of Crittenden. In 2013, Benton County, Mississippi was added to the MSA Definition.

== Crime ==
Launched in late 2006, Operation: Safe Community is an historic and ambitious crime reduction initiative. Since the launch, Memphis and Shelby County has seen a 25.4% reduction in major violent crime and a 32.6% reduction in major property crime.

In 2005, the Memphis Police Department initiated Operation Blue C.R.U.S.H. (Crime Reduction Using Statistical History), which targets crime hotspots and repeat offenders. Operation Blue C.R.U.S.H. has resulted in 30% reduction in serious crime overall; a 15% decrease in violent crime and a 400% increase in the percentage of cases solved by the Felony Assault Unit.

In 2011, Memphis was ranked as the 4th Most Dangerous City by Forbes Magazine based on the FBI's Uniform Crime Reports. The FBI strongly cautions against such rankings.

== Sports and recreation ==
In 2011, Memphis ranked 44th overall out of the largest 50 cities for overall fitness and health by the American Fitness Index. Memphis was ranked 40th out of 50 for personal health indicators and 39th for community health indicators.

Memphis is home to the University of Memphis Tigers, the Memphis Grizzlies NBA team, and the Memphis Redbirds, a Triple-A minor league baseball team. The Memphis Grizzlies were ranked 5th among 122 sports teams in ESPN's 2012 Ultimate Standings, a ranking of all sports teams. The Grizzlies ranked 1st in the category "Bang for the Buck".

The City of Memphis hosts several national sporting events annually. Events include the PGA Tour St. Jude Classic, US National Indoor Tennis Championships, the St. Jude Memphis Marathon Weekend, the Memphis in May Triathlon, the AutoZone Liberty Bowl and the Southern Heritage Classic. Sporting facilities include the FedEx Forum, Autozone Park, Memphis Racquet Club, Mike Rose Soccer Complex, and over 30 golf courses including TPC Southwind, home to the St. Jude Classic.

Memphis is home to Shelby Farms Park, a 4,500 acre park that receives about 500,000 annual visitors. The park is the 2nd largest urban county park in the United States according to the Trust for Public Land. In October 2010, the Shelby Farms Greenline opened, providing bike access from Midtown to Shelby Farms. Greater Memphis Greenline, Inc. has proposed further expansion of the Greenline, providing access to Overton Park, Uptown Memphis and the development of a multi-use Harahan Bridge Boardwalk, connecting downtown Memphis to West Memphis, Arkansas. In 2012, Bicycling magazine named Memphis "America's Most Improved Bike City", citing 35 miles of new bike lanes. 65 miles of bike lanes were expected to be completed by summer 2012.

== Zoos and museums ==
The Memphis Zoo is one of only four U.S. zoos to house giant pandas. The zoo has over 3,500 animals representing 500 species.

In 2008, the Memphis Zoo was ranked "#1 Zoo in the U.S." by TripAdvisor.com based on visitor opinions.

Memphis is home to several nationally recognized museums.

- National Civil Rights Museum - Housed at the Lorraine Motel, the site of Dr. Martin Luther King, Jr.'s assassination, provides a full overview of the Civil Rights Movement and details the events that transpired on and prior to April 4, 1968.
- Stax Museum - The world's only Soul museum
- Dixon Gallery and Gardens
- Brooks Museum of Art - Tennessee's oldest and largest museum of fine and decorative art
- National Ornamental Metal Museum - the only museum in the U.S. dedicated exclusively to fine metalwork
- Chucalissa Archaeological Museum
- Art Museum of the University of Memphis
- Pink Palace Museum and Planetarium
- Memphis Rock 'n' Soul Museum - The first and only exhibition developed by the Smithsonian Institution in partnership with another museum

== Cultural events and fairs ==
=== Carnival Memphis ===
Carnival Memphis is an annual series of parties and festivities held in early summer to salute various aspects of Memphis and its industries. Begun in 1931 as the Memphis Cotton Carnival, it is organized by the Carnival Memphis Association and its member krewes, private societies similar to those of the New Orleans Mardi Gras. A secretly selected King and Queen of Carnival reign over the festivities.

=== Memphis in May ===
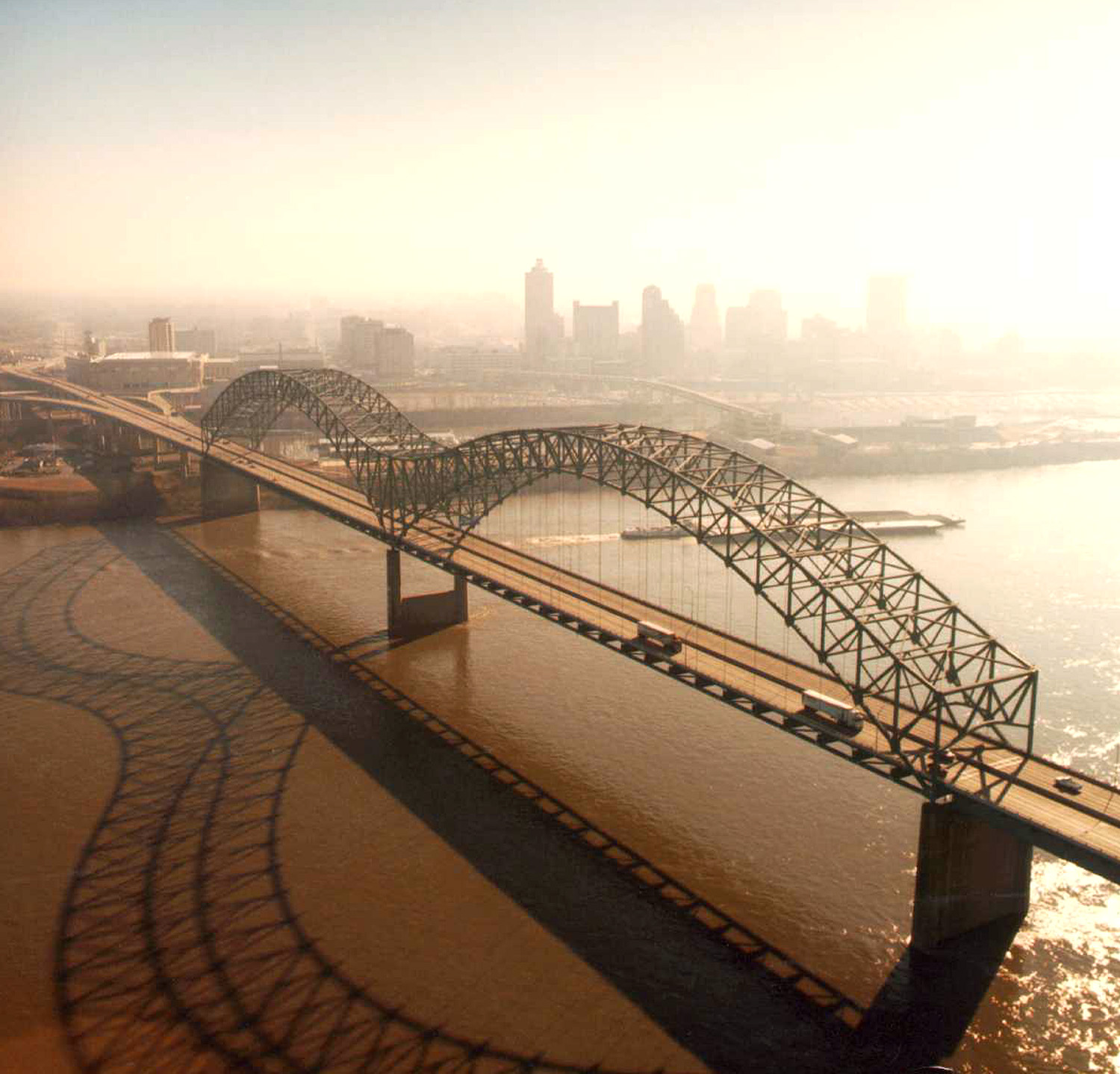
Hernando de Soto Bridge (2000)

Memphis in May promotes Memphis' musical and culinary heritage. The month-long celebration is the largest annual series of public events put on in Memphis. Each year it features a different country, highlighting aspects of the honored nation's history and culture.

Each spring since its founding in 1977, Memphis in May has had a significant economic and educational impact to the city. The celebration includes a diverse mix of events, beginning during the first weekend of the month at Tom Lee Park on the Mississippi River, the site of the Beale Street Music Festival.

During International Week, the city focuses on its honored country, part of a larger program in coordination with area schools to broaden cultural awareness among students, as well as a good deal of business linkage. Other signature events of Memphis in May include the World Championship Barbecue Cooking Contest (the largest pork barbecue cooking contest in the world) and the closing event of the month—a performance of the Memphis Symphony Orchestra on the river called the Sunset Symphony, also featuring a performance by musicians from the honored country.

Memphis in May sprang from the Cotton Carnival festivities, which began holding big musical events at the Fairgrounds. In the early 1980s the idea of Memphis in May got started. Germany and Japan were the first two nations to be honored. Events were scattered around the city. A barbecue contest was held in tents in downtown parking lots. The contest proved very popular and has grown substantially, with a dedicated volunteer corps, corporate sponsorship, school involvement, and general citizen attendance. Contestants travel from afar to compete in the barbecue contest and to enjoy the Beale Street Music Fest—originally held in vacant lots on that storied street.

=== Cooper-Young Festival ===
An arts festival, the Cooper-Young Festival, is held annually in September in the Cooper-Young district of Midtown Memphis. The event draws artists from all over North America, and includes art sales, contests, and displays.

Since the late 1980s the Cooper-Young Festival has grown into one of Memphis' most anticipated events, with over 50,000 guests in recent years enjoying a mix of art, music and crafts presented by over 300 artisans from around the country. The festival celebrates the arts, people, culture and Memphis heritage. In addition to art, the festival includes sales of clothing, jewelry, live music, and gay novelty items.

== Music and the arts ==
=== Music ===
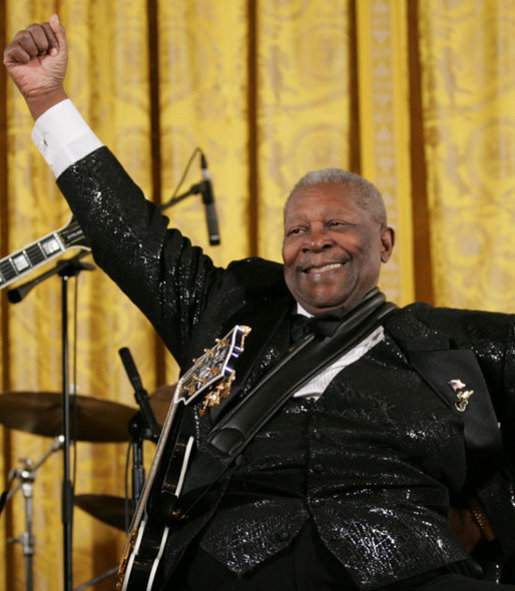
B. B. King (2006)

After the Yellow Fever epidemics of the 1870s, Memphis' population was very low, and it slowly started being replenished by country people from the Mid-South. Farmers and freed slaves alike brought their musical roots here, and the commercial hurly-burly created a polishing of this talent and heritage, best exemplified by bandleader and composer W. C. Handy.

Memphis is the home of founders and establishers of various American music genres, including Blues, Gospel, Hip-Hop, Rock n' Roll, and "rockabilly" country music (in contrast to the "rhinestone" country sound of Nashville). Johnny Cash, Elvis Presley, and B. B. King all got their starts in Memphis in the 1950s. They are respectively dubbed the "King" of Country, Rock n' Roll, and Blues.

Other famous musicians who either grew up or got their starts in the Memphis area include the Box Tops with Alex Chilton, the Gentrys, the Grifters, Nights Like These, Aretha Franklin, Carl Perkins, John Lee Hooker, Justin Timberlake, Howlin' Wolf, Jerry Lee Lewis, Bobby "Blue" Bland, Charlie Rich, Lucero (band), Al Green, Muddy Waters, Big Star, Tina Turner, Roy Orbison, Willie Mae Ford Smith, Sam Cooke, Booker T. and the MGs, Otis Redding, Arthur Lee, The Blackwood Brothers, Isaac Hayes, Rufus Thomas, Carla Thomas, The Staple Singers, Sam and Dave, Three 6 Mafia, 8 Ball & MJG, Tommy Wright III, Yo Gotti, NLE Choppa, Young Dolph, Key Glock, Moneybagg Yo, Elise Neal, Shawn Lane, Terry Manning, The Sylvers, Aquanet, Steve Cropper, Oblivians, Jay Reatard, Anita Ward, and Andrew Vanwyngarden.

Memphis is also a haven for classical music, and has produced such opera singers as Ruth Welting and Kallen Esperian. The city has its own opera company, Opera Memphis, which performs in the Orpheum Theatre in Downtown Memphis. The New York Metropolitan Opera first visited around 1910 and played to packed houses until recently when they quit doing 3-day stands. The Rudi E. Scheidt School of Music at the University of Memphis plays a critical role in music and performance in the city. The Memphis City School district was named one of the "Best Communities for Music Education" by the NAMM Foundation in 2013 for the sixth time.

The Highland Strip is an area located near the University of Memphis and is known as a haven for the college crowd. Venues such as Newby's showcase local musicians as well as national touring acts on a weekly basis. But Beale Street in Downtown is the mecca for live performance. Well known musical groups vie for work in this popular venue, crowded by tourists and locals alike. In 2009, Memphis was named as the Society of American Travel Writers 6th Best North American City “For Live Music.”

=== Dance ===
Memphis is home to several dance companies. Ballet Memphis strives to interpret the South's cultural legacy through dance, featuring both classical and modern dance choreography. New Ballet Ensemble and School (NBE) combines a professional company composed of the school's instructors with talented students, presenting classical movement fused with other styles in new interpretations of old stories. NBE received the 2014 National Arts and Humanities Youth Program Award (President’s Committee on the Arts and the Humanities) for "a program that brings together students from diverse racial, socio-economic and religious backgrounds to build self-confidence, leadership and academic success—and heal a community divided by race—through dance."

=== Literature and theater ===
Well-known writers from Memphis include Civil War historian and novelist Shelby Foote, made famous by his contributions to The Civil War series on Public Television, and playwright Tennessee Williams, who wrote his first play on Snowden Street and saw it performed on Glenview Street. Zandria F. Robinson's book This Ain’t Chicago: Race, Class, and Regional Identity in the Post-Soul South (University of North Carolina Press, April 2014), uses literature, pop culture, and interviews to examine how black southerners in Memphis think about race, class, gender, and regional identity. Novelist John Grisham grew up in nearby DeSoto County, Mississippi and many of his books, such as The Firm, The Client and The Rainmaker, are set in Memphis.

Many works of fiction and literature use Memphis as their setting, giving a diverse portrait of the city, its history, and its citizens. These include The Reivers by William Faulkner (1962), September, September by Shelby Foote (1977), The Old Forest and Other Stories by Peter Taylor (1985), the Pulitzer Prize-winning A Summons to Memphis by Peter Taylor (1986), The Firm by John Grisham (1991), Memphis Afternoons: a Memoir by James Conaway (1993), Cassina Gambrel Was Missing by William Watkins (1999), The Guardian by Beecher Smith (1999), and The Architect by James Williamson (2007).

Theater flourishes at Playhouse on the Square and Theatre Memphis. The Midtown-based Voices of the South is a non-profit, ensemble based theater company whose mission is to create, produce, and perform theatre from diverse Southern perspectives. Working out of Theatreworks (a black-box, alternative theatre owned by Playhouse on the Square), among other companies, is Our Own Voice Theatre Troupe, a non-profit group working to empower people marginalized by mental illness, and striving to engage the community in dialogue about mental health. Overton Square is currently being redeveloped into a theatre and entertainment district. The area is anchored by three live-performance theaters, including the existing Playhouse on the Square, the Circuit Playhouse, and the Hatiloo Theatre. Also in Overton Square, Malco Theatres' Studio on the Square shows both independent films and major studio films.

=== Fine arts ===
Memphis has also had a significant impact in the world of photography. William Eggleston, the pioneer of color photography as a serious artistic medium and considered one of the greatest photographers of all time, still lives and works in Memphis. A number of younger photographers, including Jeanne Umbreit and Huger Foote, are Memphians. Some other notable Memphis photographers were fashion/celebrity photographer Jack Robinson and civil rights–era documenter Ernest C. Withers.

In the last two decades, the art scene in Memphis has exploded. Art galleries were first established at Overton Square but have moved farther east. The independent art scene has had some success on South Main, on the trolley line in downtown Memphis. Several art galleries have moved into the neighborhood, stimulating a real estate boom that expanded into new residential construction. One interesting conversion was the Power House, a former power plant near Central Station that was transformed into contemporary art space by Delta Axis, a Memphis contemporary arts organization. The Power House closed in August 2009, citing economic concerns.

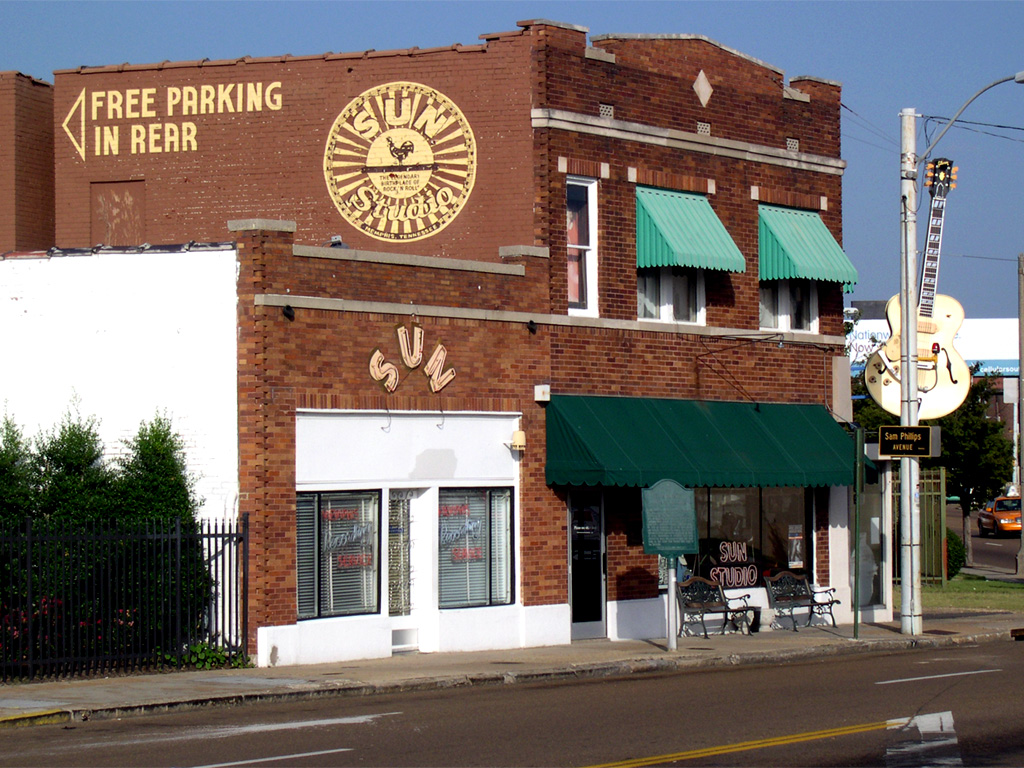
Sun Studio in 2006

The Cooper-Young neighborhood in Midtown Memphis has also been home to several art galleries. The Edge is an art studio neighborhood, located at the edge of downtown near Madison Avenue, Marshall, and Union Avenue. The Edge is home to Memphis' Black Repertory Theater, world-famous Sun Studio, and Delta Axis, among others. The old commercial strip on Broad Avenue in the Binghampton area is home to a cluster of artists and craftsmen.

Quality commercial art galleries in the east Memphis area include the David Lusk Gallery, Perry Nicole Gallery, L Ross Gallery and Lisa Kurts Gallery. All are on or near Poplar Ave., the main east–west thoroughfare. The Memphis College of Art and the Memphis Brooks Museum of Art are neighbors inside Overton Park, along with The Shell, a 1930s outdoor performing arts venue recently renovated and reopened in September 2008.

More informally, art intersects with entrepreneurship in many traditionally African American neighborhoods through hand-painted signs. Artists like James "Brick" Brigance, an Orange Mound native, paints lettering, logos and images on the brick facades of many neighborhood buildings.

=== Film ===
Memphis has an active and growing film industry. Movies filmed at least partially in Memphis include The Firm, The Client, Walk the Line, Hustle & Flow, In the Valley of Elah, and Undefeated. Indie Memphis provides year-round programming, with screenings of local and independent films. Indie Memphis also hosts an annual film festival, which was attended by more than 8,000 people in 2011.

== Cuisine ==
Memphis-style barbecue is one of the four predominant regional styles of barbecue in the United States, and has become well-known due to the World Championship Barbecue Cooking Contest held each May, which has been listed in the Guinness Book of World Records as the largest pork barbecue contest in the world. In 2012, U.S. News & World Report named Memphis the No. 1 Barbecue City in America.

In addition to barbecue, Memphis has become a top city for pizza, burgers and fine dining. Memphis was ranked the 17th Top City for Pizza by Travel + Leisure magazine. Dyer's burgers was listed as one of the "Best Burgers in the U.S." by Food and Wine magazine, and Memphis was ranked 14th best city for burgers by Travel + Leisure magazine. Memphis is also home to the famous Soul Burger at Ernestine and Hazels

Several renowned chefs operate restaurants in Memphis. Andrew Ticer and Michael Hudman, the chefs and owners of Andrew Michael Italian Kitchen and Hog & Hominy, were included in Food and Wine magazines 2013 Best New Chefs list. Kelly English, chef and owner of Restaurant Iris, was a semifinalist for "Best Chef: Southeast" in the James Beard Award competition, and listed as one of the 'Best New Chefs" by Food and Wine magazine.

== Religion ==
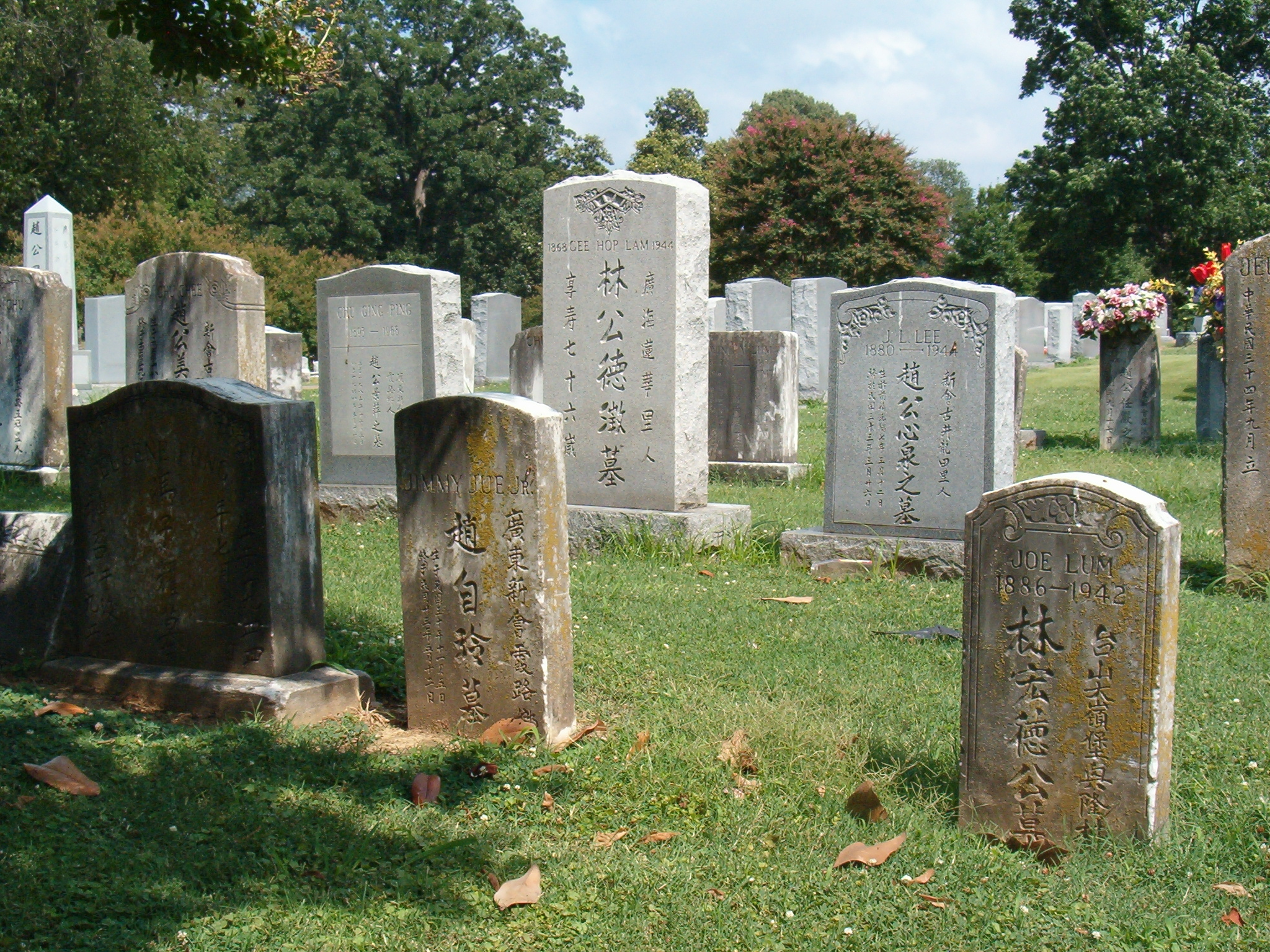
Asian-American Tombstones in Elmwood Cemetery (2007)

Since its founding, Memphis has been home to persons of many different faiths. An 1870 map of Memphis shows religious buildings of the Baptist, Catholic, Episcopal, Methodist, Presbyterian, Congregational, and Christian denominations and a Jewish congregation. Today, places of worship exist for Christians, Jews, Muslims, Buddhists, and Hindus.

Baron Hirsch Synagogue, which was founded in Memphis in the late 19th century, has the largest congregation of Orthodox Jews in the United States.

Bellevue Baptist Church is a Southern Baptist megachurch in Memphis that was founded in the early 20th century. Its current membership is approximately 27,000. For many years, it was led by Adrian Rogers, a former three term president of the Southern Baptist Convention.

The international headquarters of the Church of God in Christ, one of the fastest growing sects of Christianity and the largest Pentecostal denomination in the United States, is also in Memphis. The headquarters, Mason Temple (named after the denomination's founder, Charles Harrison Mason), is where Martin Luther King Jr. gave his famous I've Been to the Mountaintop speech the day before he was killed.

The denominational headquarters of the Cumberland Presbyterian Church are located in Memphis. Memphis is also home to the main Cumberland Presbyterian seminary, the Memphis Theological Seminary. The Cumberland Presbyterian church maintains a library and archival facility at the headquarters.

The Roman Catholic Diocese of Memphis has its seat at the Cathedral of the Immaculate Conception in Memphis, founded as a parish in 1921.

The Episcopal Diocese of West Tennessee has its cathedral, St. Mary's in Memphis.

The Chronicle of Philanthropy ranked the Memphis metro area 2nd for charitable giving based on the percentage of discretionary income given to charity.

== Media ==
The Memphis regional market is the forty-ninth largest designated market area (DMA) in the nation, with 662,830 homes (0.581% of the total U.S.). Several media outlets in print, broadcast and internet cover varying segments of the market.

=== Newspapers ===
- The Commercial Appeal — daily (Sunday-Saturday); general news. The Commercial Appeal is Memphis' largest and most widely circulated newspaper.
- The Daily News — daily (Monday-Friday); legal records and general news.
- Memphis Business Journal — weekly; business and economic news.
- The Memphis Flyer — weekly; politics, arts and entertainment, lifestyles.
- The Shelby Sun-Times — weekly; East Memphis and eastern Shelby County community news with Cordova and Germantown editions.
- The Tri-State Defender — weekly; African-American community news.
- La Prensa Latina — weekly; Hispanic community news, Spanish-English bilingual.

=== Magazines ===
- Memphis Downtowner - monthly; community interests; focus on the downtown area.
- Main Street Journal - monthly; news, entertainment and politics.
- Memphis Magazine - monthly; general community interest, arts and entertainment, lifestyles.
- Memphis Parent - monthly; family issues and interests.
- RSVP Magazine — monthly; society and philanthropy events.
- Memphis Sport - bimonthly; local sports and recreation.
- Number - a visual arts quarterly

=== Television ===
A wide variety of local television stations also serves the market area. The major network television affiliates are WMC 5 (NBC), WREG 3 (CBS), WATN 24 (ABC), WHBQ 13 (FOX), WLMT 30 (CW), and WPXX 50 (Ion). The area is also served by two PBS stations: WKNO 10 and WLJT 11.

=== Radio ===
Diverse formats can be found on the radio dial throughout the Memphis area. Two of the several stations of note include WLFP (99.7 FM, "99.7 The Wolf"), a country station — formerly WMC-FM (FM 100), which was a leading Hot AC station for more than 30 years — and the historic WDIA (1070 AM), the first African-American-operated radio station in the US. WHER the first "All-Girl" radio station was founded in Memphis by record producer Sam Phillips in 1955. WHBQ-AM and WMPS-AM broadcasting personalities Rick Dees, Wink Martindale, and Scott Shannon are now nationally known. WEVL (89.9 FM) is a volunteer-run-and-supported station where the many DJs are expert collectors in their musical provinces.
