= MSL =

MSL may refer to:

== University degrees ==
- Master of Sustainability Leadership, a master's degree in sustainability leadership studies
- Master of Science in Leadership, a master's degree in leadership studies
- Master of Studies in Law, a master's degree for students who wish to study the law but do not want to become attorneys
- Master of Science of Law, a master's degree for students who wish to study the law but do not want to become attorneys

== Business ==
- Medical science liaison, a healthcare consulting professional
- Meta Superintelligence Labs, an artificial intelligence business division of Meta Platforms
- Manning Selvage & Lee, now MSLGROUP, public relations firm, part of Publicis Groupe

== Organizations ==
- RoboCup Middle Size League, robot soccer competition
- MBCGame StarCraft League, StarCraft tournament in Korea
- Milwaukee School of Languages, in Wisconsin, US
- Microscopical Society of London, original incarnation of the Royal Microscopical Society

== Places ==
- Marshall railway station, Victoria, Australia, station code
- Northwest Alabama Regional Airport, US, IATA code

== Science and technology ==
- Mars Science Laboratory, a NASA mission which landed rover Curiosity
- Master Subsidy Lock, a type of cell phone SIM lock used by U.S. CDMA carriers
- Materials Science Laboratory, an ESA payload on ISS
- Mean sea level
- Metal Shading Language, used for Apple's Metal graphics API
- Microgravity Science Laboratory, first flown on STS-83
- Maximum segment lifetime of TCP segment in networking
- Midsternal line, an imaginary plane running through the median section of a sternum
- mIRC scripting language (abbreviated as mSL), a scripting language embedded in mIRC, an IRC client, used for automation of actions (usually for bots) and customization of the client
- Mission and Spacecraft Library, a website that tracks satellites
- Moisture sensitivity level, for semiconductor handling
- Multilayer soft lithography, a fabrication process
- Multiple single-level, computer security systems
- Materialem zum sumerischen Lexikon (Materials for the Sumerian Lexikon), a multi-volume series of publications that compile and analyze ancient Sumerian lexical lists.

== Sign languages ==
- Macedonian Sign Language, the sign language of the deaf community in Macedonia
- Malagasy Sign Language, a sign language used for communication among hearing impaired people in Madagascar
- Mauritian Sign Language, a sign language used in Mauritania
- Maritime Sign Language, a sign language descended from British Sign Language
- Mongolian Sign Language, a sign language used in Mongolia
- Moroccan Sign Language, a sign language of the deaf community of Tetouan and some other cities of Morocco

== Sports ==
- Major Soccer League, an indoor soccer league in the United States from 1978 to 1992
- Malaysia Super League, a top-tier football league in Malaysia
- Major Series Lacrosse, a Senior A box lacrosse league in Canada
- Memphis Sport Live, radio show, Tennessee, US
- Moldovan Super Liga, top division association football league in Moldova
- Mzansi Super League, a cricket tournament in South Africa
