= Ballet Memphis =

American ballet company in Memphis, Tennessee

General information
- Name: Ballet Memphis
- Previous names: Memphis Concert Ballet
- Year founded: 1986; 40 years ago
- Founder: Dorothy Gunther Pugh
- Principal venue: Orpheum Theatre
- Website: balletmemphis.org

Senior staff
- Chief executive: Gretchen Wollert McLennon
- Administrator: Carol Miraglia
- Company manager: Courtney Sage

Artistic staff
- Artistic director: Steven McMahon
- Ballet master: Ben Delony
- Ballet mistress: Julie Marie Niekrasz

Other
- Orchestra: Memphis Symphony Orchestra
- Official school: Ballet Memphis School, Youth Ballet Memphis

Ballet Memphis is an American ballet company based in Memphis, Tennessee. It was founded as Memphis Concert Ballet in 1986 by Dorothy Gunther Pugh. Ballet Memphis regularly performs at their Midtown home, at Playhouse on the Square, Crosstown Theater and the Orpheum Theatre.

Ballet Memphis presents classical and mixed-repertory contemporary choreography.

== History ==
Ballet Memphis was founded in 1975 as Memphis Youth Concert Ballet. In 1986, it was renamed Memphis Concert Ballet when it was refocused as a professional troupe under Dorothy Gunther Pugh. In July 1996, the company was renamed Ballet Memphis.

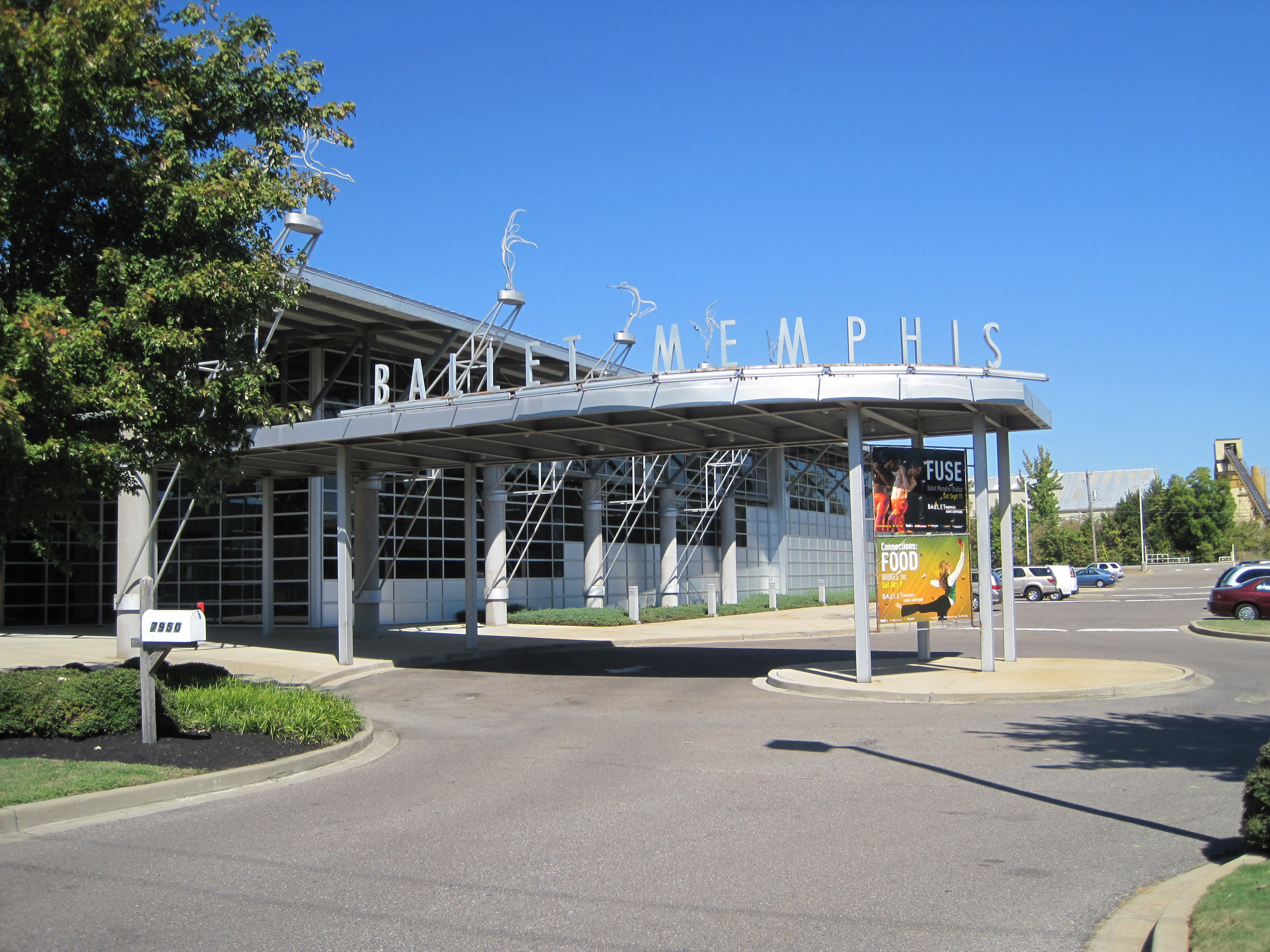
Former Trinity Rd location

In August 1997, Ballet Memphis began constructing a new location on Trinity Rd in Cordova. The building was designed with metal and glass to give it an industrial feel and included a marquee-like sign and five sculptures of dancers to maximize its visibility from the road.

The current Ballet Memphis building is located on Madison Ave in Midtown and opened to the public in August 2017. It was designed by archimania and features a five-story rehearsal studio used for performances. That same month, Ballet Memphis sold its Trinity Rd building to Tennessee Shakespeare Company.

In 2019, Pugh began to retire from leading Ballet Memphis, selecting Steven McMahon to succeed her as artistic director. In July 2020, Gretchen Wollert McLennon was selected by the company's board of directors as the new president and CEO.

== Dancers ==
Dancers (as of 2024–2025 season) are:

- Iori Araya
- Kennedy Ballard
- Angelina Broad
- Anwen Brown
- Cayce Cavett
- Matthew Cunningham
- Nicolas Gongora
- Cecily Khuner
- Noah Long
- Phoebe Magna
- Beth Ann Maslinoff
- Darcy McLoughlin
- Wyatt Pendelton
- Demetrious Reed
- Emilia Sandoval
- Rianna Talento
- Gretchen Vander Bloomer
- Harry Warshaw
- Rosamond Mullinax (Trainee)

== Repertoire ==
The company performs its normal October–April season at its Midtown building, the Orpheum Theater, and Playhouse on the Square. Its repertoire includes classical and contemporary choreography including retellings of stories such as Dracula and The Wizard of Oz. Ballet Memphis has performed The Nutcracker every year since 1987. In December 2020, Ballet Memphis released an abbreviated version of The Nutcracker on WKNO and their website instead of having live performances due to the COVID-19 pandemic, with the first act recorded at the Mallory–Neely House.

== Ballet Memphis School ==
The Ballet Memphis School offers ballet lessons for ages 3 through adult. It is led by Brandon and Virginia Ramey.

Youth Ballet Memphis is the highest level of the school, with students practicing and performing alongside members of the professional company.

== See also ==
- Culture of Memphis, Tennessee
