= Crystal Brothers =

American ballerina

Crystal Brothers is a retired American ballerina who spent much of her career at Ballet Memphis (1996–2019).

== Career ==
Brothers is from Yuma, Arizona, and trained with Kathleen Sinclair and Jon Cristofori. She briefly danced with the second company at Boston Ballet before being injured. She joined Ballet Memphis in 1996, and danced lead roles in many of their productions including Steven McMahon's Romeo and Juliet and Cinderella; Mark Godden's A Midsummer Night's Dream and Firebird; Joseph Jefferies' The Little Mermaid as well as in Beauty and the Beast, S'epanouir, Paquita, Swan Lake, and Giselle, Rafael Ferreras' Politics, Steven McMahon's Wizard of Oz and Peter Pan, and Julia Adam's Devil's Fruit. She has also danced in works by choreographers including Matthew Neenan, Thaddeus Davis, Jane Comfort and Trey McIntyre. With Theatre Memphis, Brothers has performed in Hello Dolly!, La Cage aux Folles, and Cinderella, and she appeared in Playhouse on the Square's 2022 production of Something Rotten.

Brothers was named "Outstanding Artist in Dance" by the Tennessee Arts Commission and is the first Ballet Memphis recipient of the award. She was named one of the top eight dancers with watch in the world by Pointe Magazine. She won an Ostrander Award for her performance as Victoria (The White Cat) in Theatre Memphis' 2019 production of Cats.

Since her retirement from dancing, Brothers has taught ballet. She is a company teacher at New Ballet Ensemble and Collage Dance Collective in Memphis, Tennessee.
