= Looney Ricks Kiss =

Looney Ricks Kiss (LRK)

Practice information
- Founded: 1983

Significant works and honors
- Buildings: FedEx Forum, Crosstown Concourse, Harbor Town, Memphis, Celebration, Florida, Metal Museum, Baldwin Park, Florida, AutoZone Park, Renasant Convention Center, Tennessee Brewery, The Gulch, Nashville, Tennessee, Madison Academic Magnet High School, Stax Museum of American Soul Music

Website
- www.lrk.com

Looney Ricks Kiss, also known as LRK, is an American Memphis-based full-service architecture firm founded in 1983 by Carson Looney, FAIA, Frank Ricks, FAIA, and Richard Kiss, AIA. In addition to architecture, its services include planning, interior architecture and environmental graphic design. LRK is known for a variety of projects including the Urban Land Institute Award of Excellence honored AutoZone Park, Crosstown Concourse and Harbor Town.

Looney Ricks Kiss has developed a regional, national and international practice that is based on corporate/office, banking/financial, healthcare, hospitality, and residential projects.

== Office locations ==
- Memphis, Tennessee
- Baton Rouge, Louisiana
- Orlando, Florida
- Dallas, Texas
- Little Rock, Arkansas
- New Orleans, Louisiana
- Philadelphia, Pennsylvania
