= Harbor Town, Memphis =

Neighborhood in Memphis, Tennessee, US

Coordinates: 35.1714°N 90.0514°W

Harbor Town
- Neighborhood of Memphis
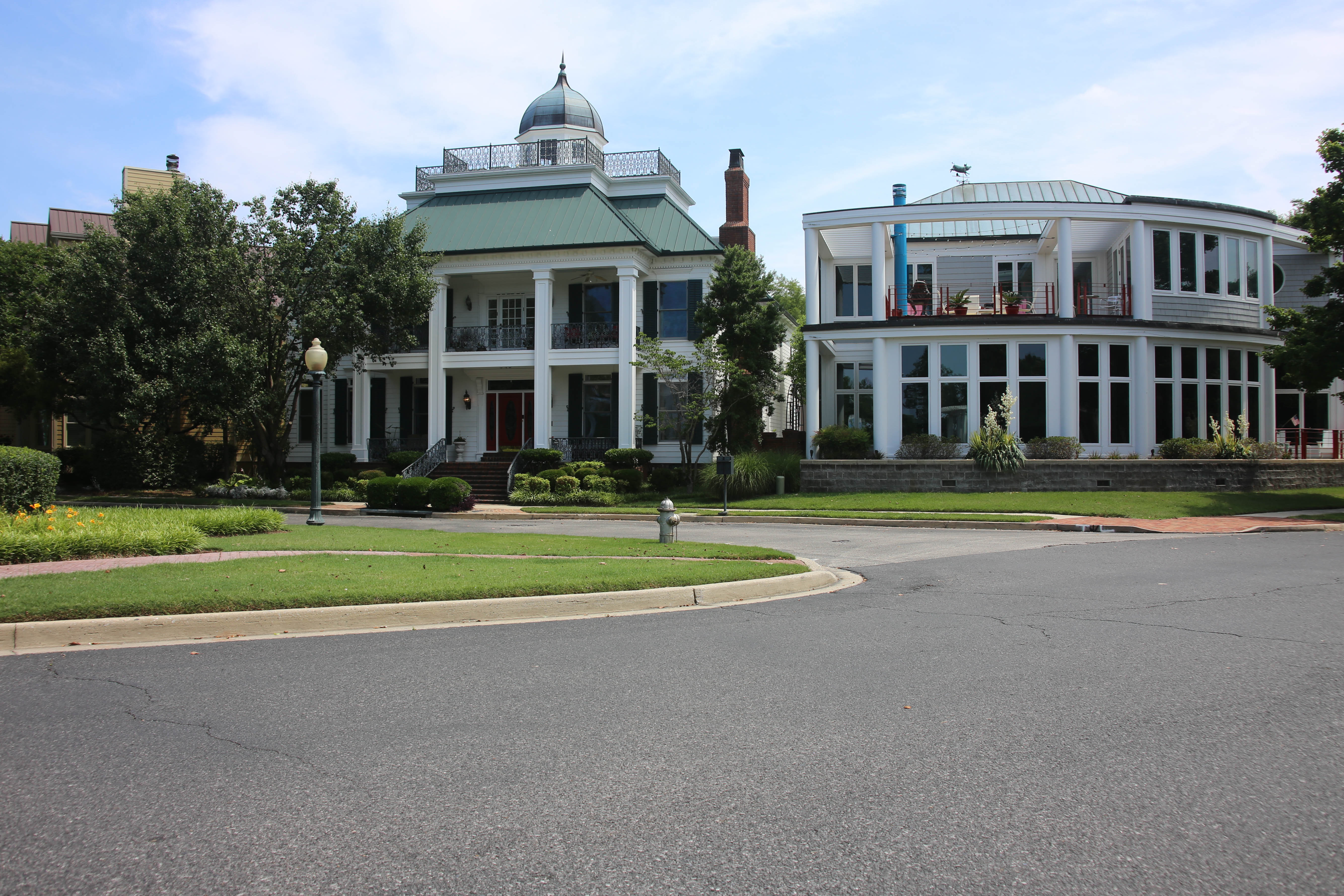
- Interactive map of Harbor Town
- Country: United States
- State: Tennessee
- County: Shelby County
- City: Memphis
- ZIP Code: 38103

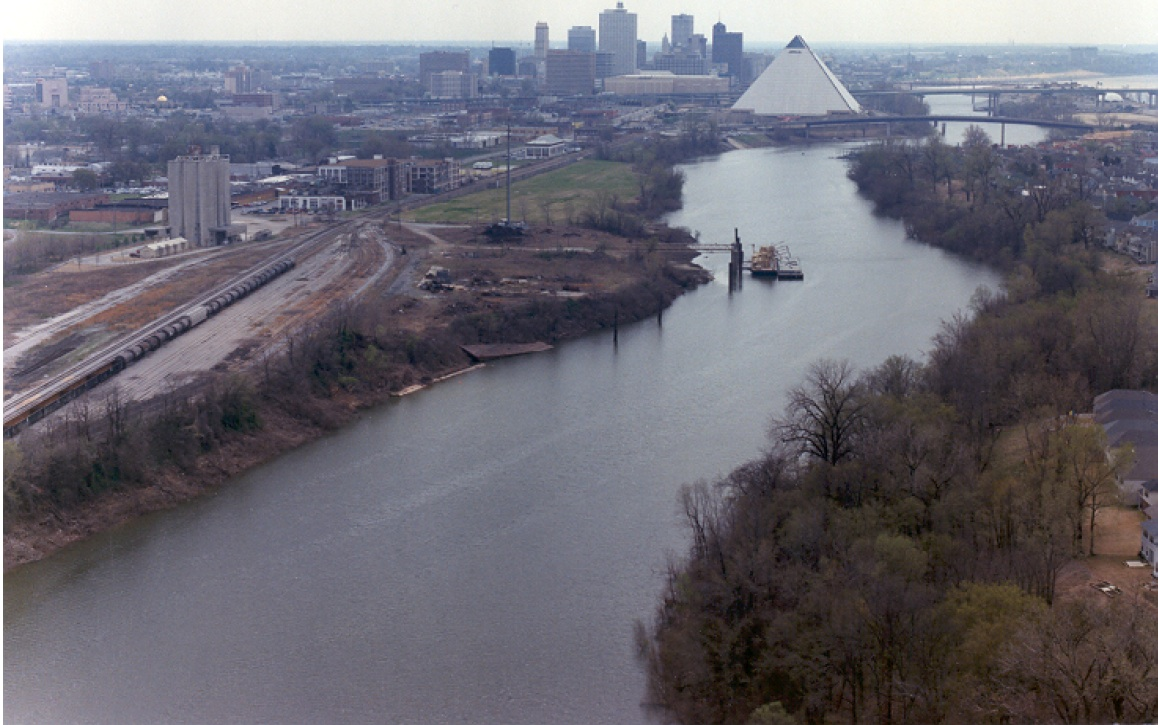
Wolf River Harbor, 2006

Harbor Town is a new urbanist-style neighborhood in Memphis, Tennessee. Harbor Town sits atop 132 acres (53 hectares) on a sandbar in the Mississippi River known as Mud Island. It was developed in 1989, and was a collaborative effort of Memphis developer Henry Turley, RTKL of Baltimore, and the Looney Ricks Kiss architectural firm from Memphis. The Henry Turley Company stated that the neighborhood intends to "emphasize the human rather than the automobile." Nowadays Harbor Town is considered dense and walkable, known for its traditional row houses, shops, parks, and marina.

== History ==
Prior to 1988, Harbor Town was an undeveloped sandbar in the Mississippi River. While Memphis intended to extend I-240 onto the sandbar, Henry Turley, a local developer opposed the plan, envisioning a walkable community instead. With support from organizations like Future Memphis, Inc., Turley successfully blocked the highway and later purchased the foreclosed land for $2.25 million. Collaborating with architectural firms RKTL and Looney Ricks Kiss, Turley created Harbor Town, emphasizing density, walkability, and community interaction. The neighborhood, now home to over 3,000 residents, features diverse housing options and amenities within walking distance.

== Geography ==
Harbor Town is located northwest of Downtown Memphis, Tennessee on Mud Island along the Mississippi River.

== Mississippi River Flood of 2011 ==
Harbor Town was closed to everyone except residents for a short period of time in May 2011 when the Mississippi River reached a level of 48 feet (15 m), 14 feet (4.3 m) above flood stage. A 5-foot (1.5 m)-high emergency levee was built in the afternoon and evening of May 9, 2011, in the west lane of Island Drive. The east lane remained open in the event that Mud Island had to be evacuated, since Mud Island Drive (the road north of Harbor Town and the only other land access to Mud Island) was under water. Some homes along Wolf River Harbor had to be evacuated but no major damage was reported.

== See also ==
- List of neighborhoods in Memphis, Tennessee
