= AutoZone Park =

Baseball stadium in Memphis, Tennessee, US

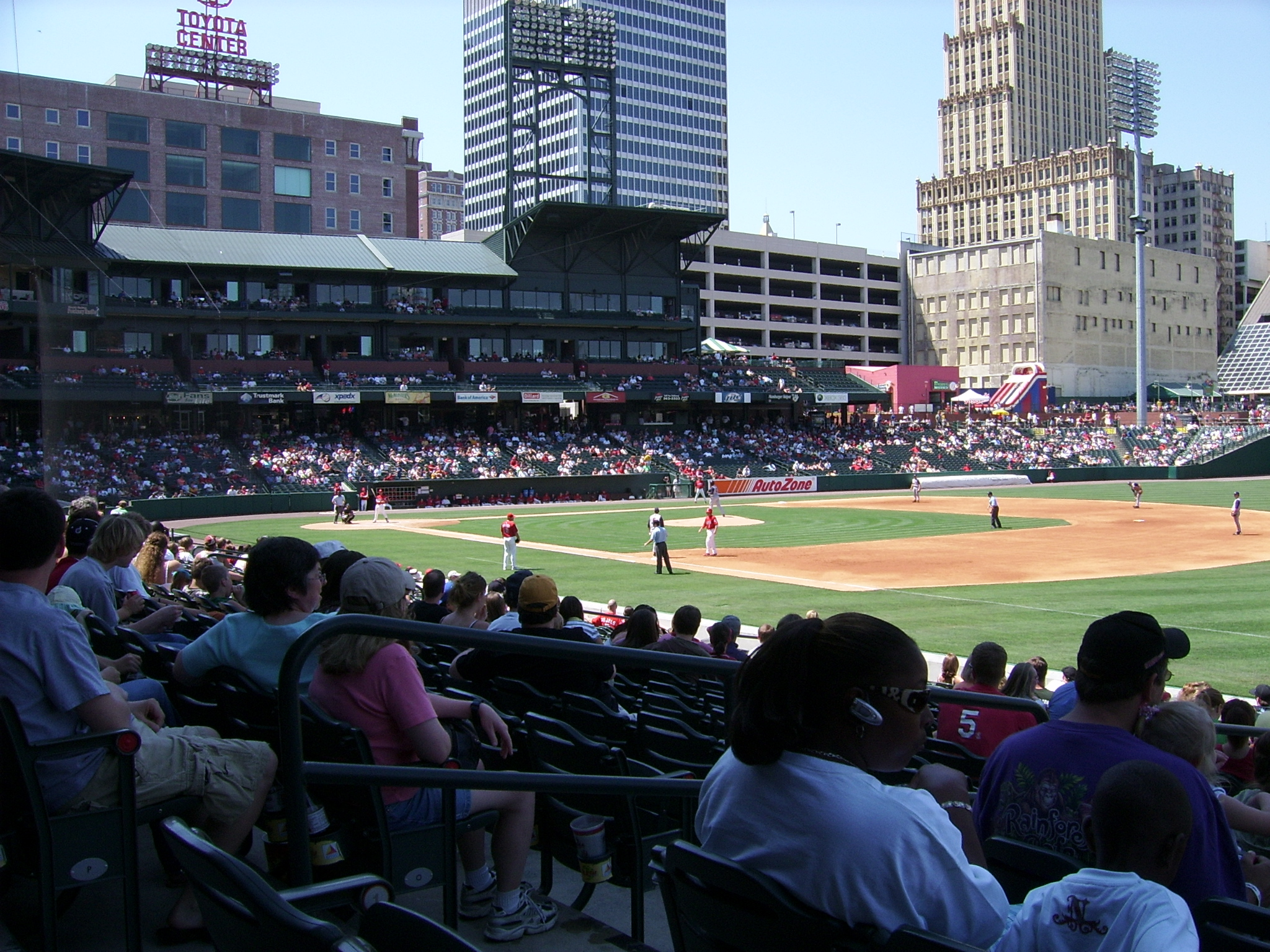
- A Redbirds game at AutoZone Park

- Location within Tennessee Location within the United States
- Location: 200 Union Avenue; Memphis, Tennessee; United States
- Coordinates: 35°8′35″N 90°2′57″W
- Owner: City of Memphis
- Operator: Memphis Redbirds, LLC
- Capacity: 10,000 (2015–present); 14,384 (2008–2014); 14,320 (2000–2007)
- Surface: Tifton 419 Bermuda grass
- Record attendance: 18,620 (August 31, 2008; Oklahoma RedHawks vs. Memphis Redbirds)
- Field size: Left field: 319 ft (97 m); Left-center field: 360 ft (110 m); Center field: 400 ft (122 m); Right-center field: 373 ft (114 m); Right field: 322 ft (98 m)
- Public transit: Main Street Line at Union Avenue

Construction
- Groundbreaking: January 15, 1998
- Opened: April 1, 2000
- Cost: $80.5 million ($151 million in 2025 dollars)
- Architects: Looney Ricks Kiss; HOK Sport
- Structural engineers: Stanley D. Lindsey & Associates
- Services engineer: Griffith C. Burr Inc.
- General contractor: Beers-Inman

Tenants
- Memphis Redbirds (PCL/AAAE/IL) 2000–present Memphis 901 FC (USLC) 2019–2024

AutoZone Park is a Minor League Baseball stadium located in downtown Memphis, Tennessee, and is home to the Memphis Redbirds of the International League, the Triple-A affiliate of Major League Baseball's (MLB) St. Louis Cardinals. It previously hosted Memphis 901 FC of the USL Championship, the second tier of U.S. soccer, from 2019 to 2024.

== History ==
Designed by Looney Ricks Kiss Architects of Memphis with Kansas City-based HOK Sport (now Populous), AutoZone Park cost $80.5 million to build. This is by far the most money ever spent on a structure dedicated to a minor league baseball team. AutoZone Park was built to "MLB standards", but with the absence of outfield seats or food vendors far down the foul lines, making it, for comparison purposes, a major league stadium with only the 'good' seats". It opened in 2000, replacing Tim McCarver Stadium. The stadium also hosts some games for the University of Memphis baseball team, and most notably, the annual games with Ole Miss & Mississippi State.

The Redbirds had been unique in baseball until recently, in that they were owned by a non-profit community foundation, the Memphis Redbirds Foundation; the Green Bay Packers of the NFL have a similar ownership structure. However, the Foundation defaulted on its bond payment in 2010. On November 15, 2013, the Foundation announced that the default would be remedied by the St. Louis Cardinals paying off the bonds at a discount and acquiring the Redbirds, while the city of Memphis resumes ownership of the stadium.

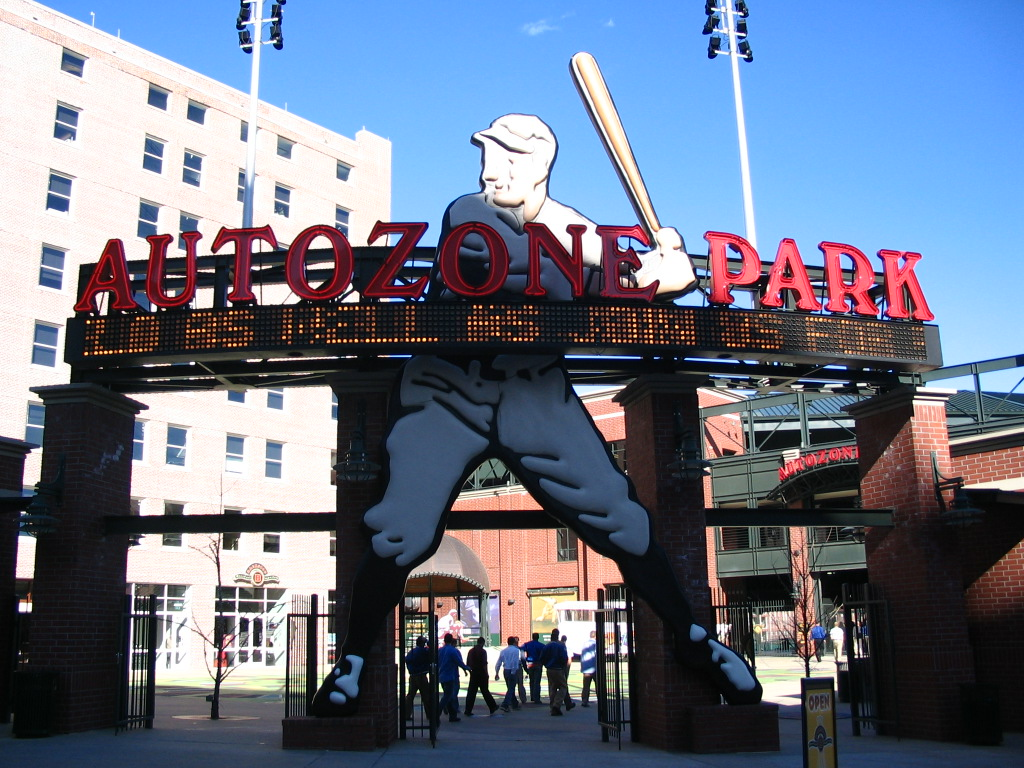
The park's main entrance

The stadium hosted the 2003 Triple-A All-Star Game in which the International League All-Stars defeated the Pacific Coast League All-Stars, 13–9.

In October 2004 and 2005 AutoZone Park was home to the Greater Mid-South Jaycees Field of Screams Haunted House.

In October 2005, AutoZone Park became the first venue outside of New Orleans to host the Voodoo Music Experience. One day of this music festival was moved to Memphis due to Hurricane Katrina.

On December 4, 2006, at the Major League Baseball Winter Meetings, MLB announced that an exhibition game to be called the Civil Rights Game would be held at AutoZone Park, with the first game on March 31, 2007. The game featured the Cardinals and the Cleveland Indians, with the Cardinals winning, 5–1. The second game was played on March 29, 2008, between the Chicago White Sox and the New York Mets. The Mets defeated the White Sox, 3–2.

On August 31, 2008, the ballpark's largest crowd to date witnessed the Redbirds lose to the Oklahoma RedHawks, 10–7, in front of 18,620 fans.

AutoZone Park was the site of the 2016 Triple-A National Championship Game in which the Scranton/Wilkes-Barre RailRiders, champions of the International League, defeated the PCL-champion El Paso Chihuahuas, 3–1, before a crowd of 9,471 people on September 20. The stadium once again hosted the championship game on September 17, 2019, in which the PCL's Sacramento River Cats defeated the Columbus Clippers, 4–0, with 9,123 on hand.

=== Soccer ===
Memphis 901 FC, a USL Championship soccer team, played at AutoZone Park from 2019 to 2024. They made their league debut at the stadium on March 9, 2019, and lost 1–0 to the Tampa Bay Rowdies in front of a sellout crowd of 8,062. It was the first professional soccer match played in Memphis since 1994. For soccer matches, the infield was covered with sod and a pitch was laid along the first base line. The pitcher's mound was initially leveled and covered; plans to install a retractable mound for easier conversions were also discussed. The team announced plans to build their own soccer-specific stadium in late 2022 at the site of the Mid-South Coliseum; the new stadium was projected to open in 2025. After the funding fell through, the team's owners transferred franchise rights to Santa Barbara, California.

== Size ==
AutoZone Park has a seating capacity of 10,000, and has been aptly described as "one-third" of a major league baseball park.

For its construction 17,586 cubic yards (13,445 m^{3}) of concrete were used, or enough to cover 11 acres (4.5 ha). There are 125,738 square feet (11,681.4 m^{2}) of brick walls surrounding it, utilizing 380,000 specially manufactured bricks. It holds 3,400 short tons (3,100 metric tons) of steel and 227 miles (365 km) of electrical wiring. To build the playing field, 350 short tons (320 metric tons) of clay, and 5,000 short tons (4,500 metric tons) of sand were needed. The outfield contains 100,000 square feet (9,300 m^{2}) of sod. The infield is capable of draining 1 inch (25 mm) of rain per hour while remaining playable, which means that the field only rarely has to be covered during games.

AutoZone Park also has one of the largest video screens in minor league baseball. It is located 127 feet (39 m) above the playing field, providing a view of the board to many areas of downtown Memphis. On January 10, 2012 the Memphis Commercial Appeal reported that the Redbirds planned to install a 60-by-60-foot (18 by 18 m) full HD video display, replacing the old video screen. The new video board will be the largest in Minor League Baseball.

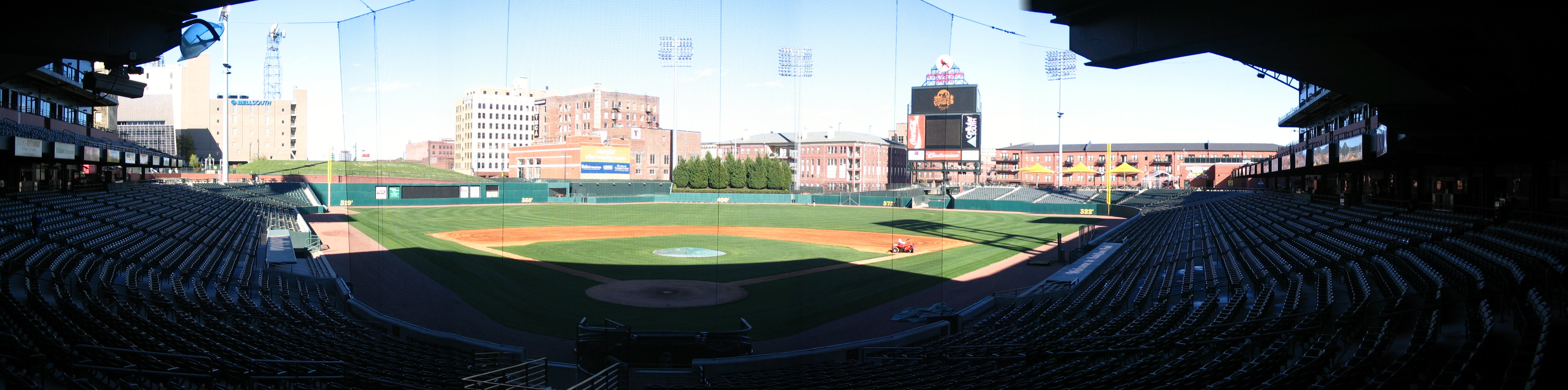
A panoramic view of the field and stands inside AutoZone Park

== Amenities ==
AutoZone Park contains several special seating sections designed to give patrons a variety of viewing options.

- The Family Leisure Picnic Pavilion is located on the east of the park, and contains several picnic tables and space for vending food. It is commonly used for special event hosting, and can seat up to 500 people.
- The Bluffs, located in each corner of the park has grass covered lawn seating, and tickets to this area are sold cheaply, but in limited numbers. It is a favorite spot for many fans because of the picnic atmosphere. Chairs are not allowed on the Bluff.
- The upper club levels contain 700 seats in 48 suites, and are generally reserved to groups or local companies. Many larger Memphis companies retain one suite for the entire season, for all games.
- The normal club seating have access to an air conditioned concourse, along with several restaurants and bars located on the concourse itself.
- In total, the ballpark has 1,600 club seats.
- There are two open-air party decks, each of which seats up to 175 people, and three pre-game balconies.

== Attendance records ==
AutoZone Park's single-game attendance record was set on August 31, 2008, for a game between the Redbirds and the Oklahoma RedHawks in front of a sellout crowd of 18,620 people. The park's season attendance record of 887,976 and average attendance record of 12,507 were both set in 2001. Attendance records through the completion of the 2019 season are as follows.

=== Single-game attendance ===
Bold indicates the winner of each game.

Single-game attendance records
Rank	Attendance	Date	Game result	Ref.
1	18,620	August 31, 2008	Oklahoma RedHawks – 2, **Memphis Redbirds** – 4	
2	18,302	July 4, 2006	**Nashville Sounds** – 4, Memphis Redbirds – 1	
3	17,508	August 26, 2000	**Nashville Sounds** – 11, Memphis Redbirds – 9	
4	17,213	July 4, 2007	**Albuquerque Isotopes** – 12, Memphis Redbirds – 7	
5	17,107	April 20, 2002	**New Orleans Zephyrs** – 5, Memphis Redbirds – 3	
6	17,104	August 10, 2002	**Nashville Sounds** – 8, Memphis Redbirds – 3	
7	17,048	August 17, 2013	**Omaha Storm Chasers** – 5, Memphis Redbirds – 4	
8	16,965	August 26, 2006	Nashville Sounds – 1, **Memphis Redbirds** – 2 (10 innings)	
9	16,920	July 4, 2005	Omaha Royals – 1, **Memphis Redbirds** – 6 (7 innings)	
10	16,703	July 4, 2004	Nashville Sounds – 3, **Memphis Redbirds** – 6	

=== Season attendance ===
Season attendance records
Rank	Year	Total attendance		Openings		Average attendance		Ref.
Rank	Year	Total	PCL rank	Openings	PCL rank	Average	PCL rank	Ref.
1	2001	887,976	—	71	—	12,507	—	
2	2000	859,823	—	72	—	11,942	—	
3	2002	794,550	—	72	—	11,035	—	
4	2003	749,446	—	72	—	10,409	—	
5	2004	730,565	—	70	—	10,436	—	
6	2005	696,083	3rd	69	4th (tie)	10,088	2nd	
7	2006	692,426	2nd	71	2nd (tie)	9,752	2nd	
8	2007	633,129	3rd	72	1st (tie)	8,793	3rd	
9	2008	569,172	4th	69	4th (tie)	8,249	4th	
10	2013	498,362	5th	69	4th (tie)	7,223	5th	
11	2012	493,706	6th	71	2nd (tie)	6,954	6th	
12	2011	493,528	6th	70	3rd (tie)	7,050	5th	
13	2009	474,764	7th	68	5th (tie)	6,982	6th	
14	2010	462,041	7th	71	2nd (tie)	6,508	7th	
15	2014	381,429	10th	67	5th	5,693	9th	
16	2017	350,007	13th	69	3rd (tie)	5,073	13th	
17	2018	340,476	13th	68	3rd	5,007	13th	
18	2019	327,753	15th	66	5th (tie)	4,966	13th	
19	2016	324,581	15th	69	4th	4,704	15th	
20	2015	278,579	16th	69	4th (tie)	4,037	16th	
21	2020	Season cancelled (COVID-19 pandemic)						
**Totals**	—	11,038,396	—	1,395	—	7,913	—	—

Events and tenants
Preceded by Tim McCarver Stadium	Home of the Memphis Redbirds; 2000 – present	Succeeded by Current
Preceded by first game	Host of the Civil Rights Game; 2007 – 2008	Succeeded by Great American Ball Park
