= Mission and Spacecraft Library =

NASA reference library website

- Website type: Reference website
- Owner: NASA
- Creator: Mike Evans
- Current status: Not updated since 1999

Mission and Spacecraft Library (MSL) is a reference web site, maintained by NASA, containing information about satellites. It contains a catalog of several hundreds of satellites from different countries. The site was founded by Jet Propulsion Laboratory employee Mike Evans, who had a vision of building a database that would be publicly accessible via the World Wide Web. The site has not been updated since 1999.
