= Crosstown Concourse =

Mixed-use development in Memphis, Tennessee

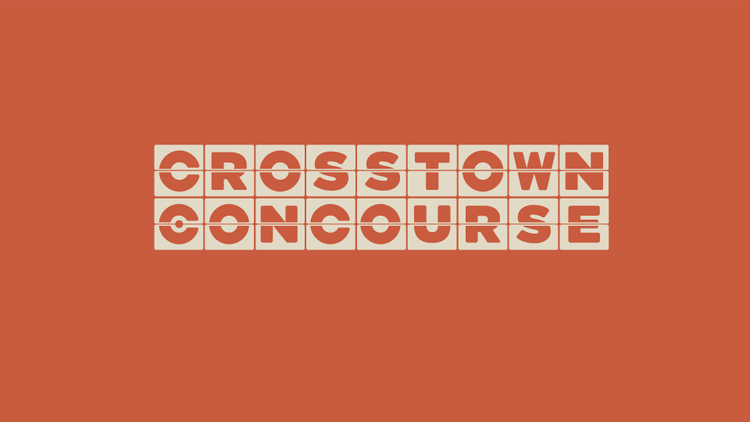

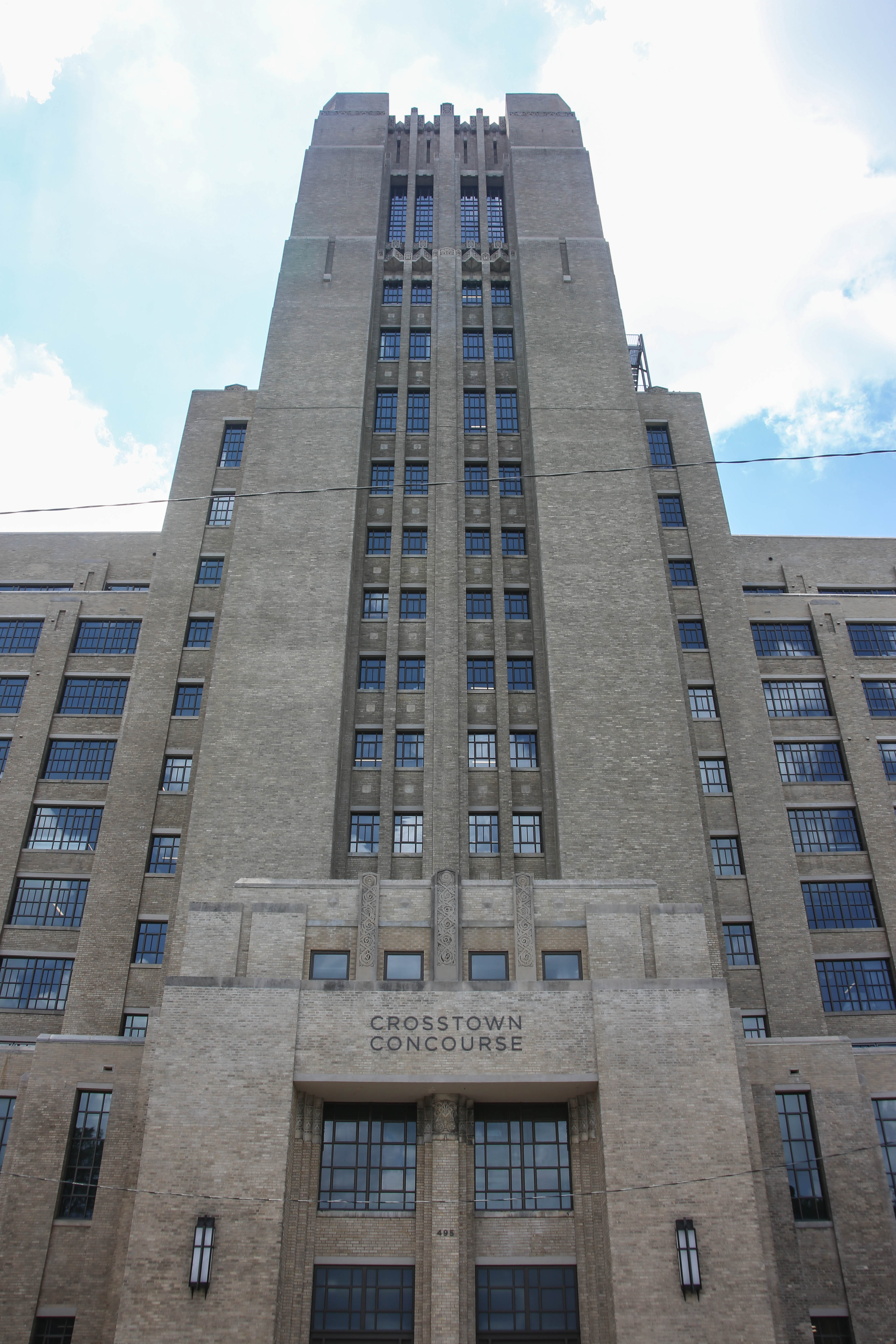
- East façade and 14-story tower (2018)
- Interactive map of the Crosstown Concourse area
- Former names: Sears Crosstown
- Etymology: Streetcar intersection

General information
- Type: Mixed-use high-rise
- Architectural style: Art Deco & Art Moderne
- Location: 495 North Watkins Street, Memphis, Tennessee, United States
- Current tenants: #Tenants
- Groundbreaking: February 21, 1927
- Opened: August 27, 1927
- Renovated: February 21, 2015 – 2017
- Renovation cost: $200 million (approx. $263M in 2025)

Height
- Height: 188.00 feet (57.30 m)

Technical details
- Floor count: 14
- Floor area: 1 million ft^{2} (93,000 m^{2})
- Grounds: 16 acres (6.5 ha)

Design and construction
- Architecture firm: Nimmons & Co.

Renovating team
- Renovating firm: DIALOG; Looney Ricks Kiss

Other information
- Parking: 1526 spaces

Website
- crosstownconcourse.com
- Sears, Roebuck and Company Catalog Distribution Center and Retail Store
- U.S. National Register of Historic Places
- NRHP reference No.: 13000954
- Added to NRHP: December 28, 2013

Crosstown Concourse is a mixed-use development and historic high-rise building in Memphis, Tennessee. Originally built in 1927 as a Sears retail store and catalog order plant, the building was closed in 1993. A 2015–2017 renovation brought in retail, restaurants, office spaces, and apartments.

== Building ==
Crosstown Concourse is at the intersection of Watkins and North Parkway in Midtown, Memphis, a few miles northeast of Downtown. The address is 495 North Watkins Street, Memphis, Tennessee 38104.

Designed by Nimmons & Co. in Art Deco and Art Moderne styles, the building is constructed of steel-reinforced concrete with a brick veneer. The main building is ten stories tall with a 14-story tower, considered a high-rise even by the standards of 1981.

Originally on 16 acres (6.5 ha) of land, the building was expanded in 1937, 1941, and 1965, ending up with an area of 1.5 million square feet (140,000 m^{2}) on 19 acres (7.7 ha). The basement covered 75,000 square feet (7,000 m^{2}) and had 14-foot (4.3 m) ceilings. Floors one and two had 17-foot (5.2 m) ceilings with 227,500 and 190,100 square feet (21,140 and 17,660 m^{2}), respectively. Floors three through ten each had 139,100 square feet (12,920 m^{2}) of area and 11-foot (3.4 m) ceilings (excepting the tenth floor with 14-foot (4.3 m) ceilings).

The building has a maximum height of 188.00 feet (57.30 m), and was certified LEED Platinum in 2017. Of 1526 parking spaces, 1130 (74%) were in the parking garage, while 396 (26%) were surface spots.

== History ==
=== Sears ===
In 1925, with the rate of automobile registrations outpacing available retail parking, Sears' vice-president of factories and retail—Robert E. Wood—decided that the company's new big stores would be built away from city centres, and instead in low-density areas where costs were cheaper yet car-owning customers could still reach. Sears Crosstown and Sears-Pico were among the first new constructions beholden to this edict. Sears scouted the site in secret to prevent price gouging by locals if it was learned in advance that the retail giant was interested in property. In the late 1920s, the chosen location was in a suburban neighborhood two miles (3.2 km) from Downtown.

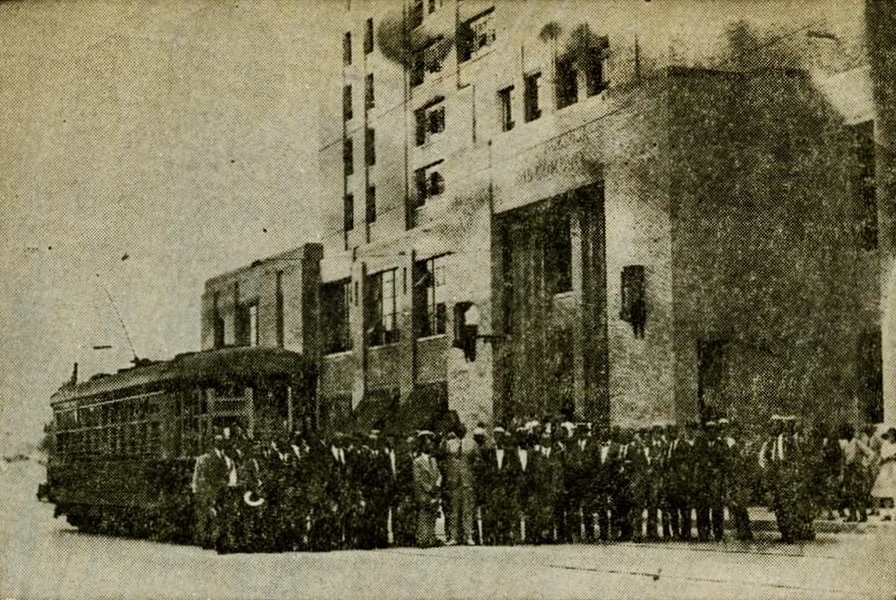
Sears in 1927

The building was originally dual-purposed as both the city's first Sears retail store and a catalog order plant. The original groundbreaking took place on February 21, 1927, and after only 180 days of construction, Mayor Rowlett Paine—who had allocated US$100,000 (equivalent to about $1.9 million in 2025) to build streetcar tracks specially for servicing the 640,000-square-foot (59,000 m^{2}) building—cut the ribbon on August 27, 1927. The very first day of business saw almost 30,000 shoppers.

At the building's busiest, as many as 45,000 catalog orders left each day. By 1981, the building was called Sears Crosstown, named for the intersecting streetcar lines. The first two floors were Sears retail, while the third was an outlet store; higher floors were concerned with the business of fulfilling catalog orders. In August 1983, employees were first informed about the impending closure of the retail store, though the surplus-goods outlet in the basement stayed open. Sears closed the distribution center completely in 1993, selling the building in 2000 to Memtech LLC for $1.25 million (equivalent to about $2.34M in 2025).

=== Renovation ===
Around 2007, Holliday Fenoglio Fowler listed the vacant building for sale, hoping to capitalize on the trend of renovating former Sears buildings into mixed-use development (as successfully done in Boston, Dallas, and Seattle). That same year, a group of anonymous Memphis investors doing business as Crosstown LLC bought the building for $3.5 million (equivalent to about $5.4M in 2025). Crosstown LLC have been described as "local investors who bought the property for civic reasons [and] are not involved for the publicity."

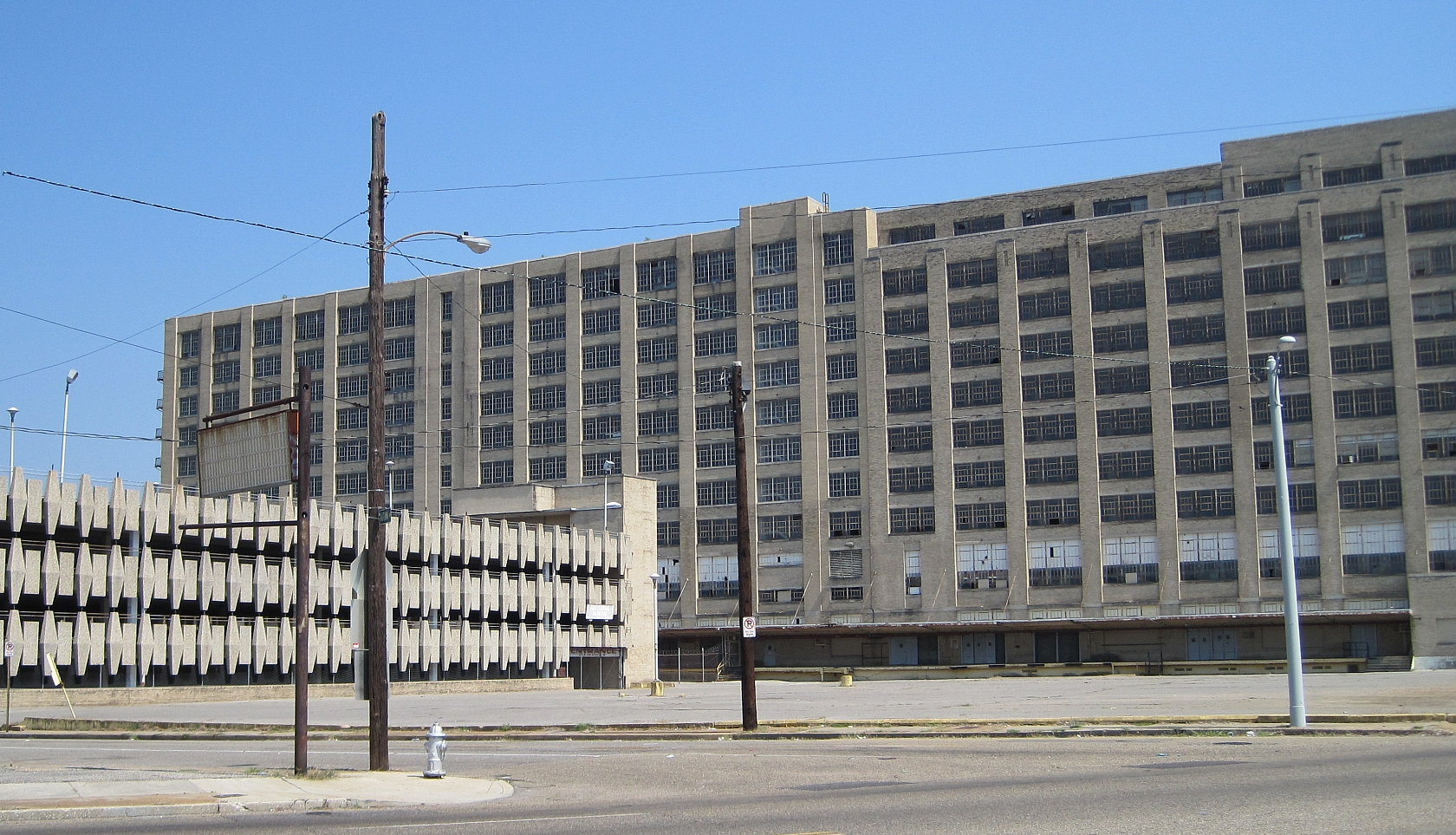
Sears Crosstown in 2010

Crosstown LLC brought in a team of developers (the Sears Crosstown Development Team) to redesign and renovate the building. Dr. Todd Richardson was an assistant professor of art history at the University of Memphis, brought in as team lead. He was joined by McLean Wilson, vice president of Kemmons Wilson Inc.; Bologna Consultants; Carkuff Interiors; architectural firms of Looney Ricks Kiss and DIALOG; construction firm Grinder Taber & Grinder; and the marketing firm of Doug Carpenter & Associates. Richardson later admitted that the team originally gave the project a five percent chance of success.

==== Structural ====
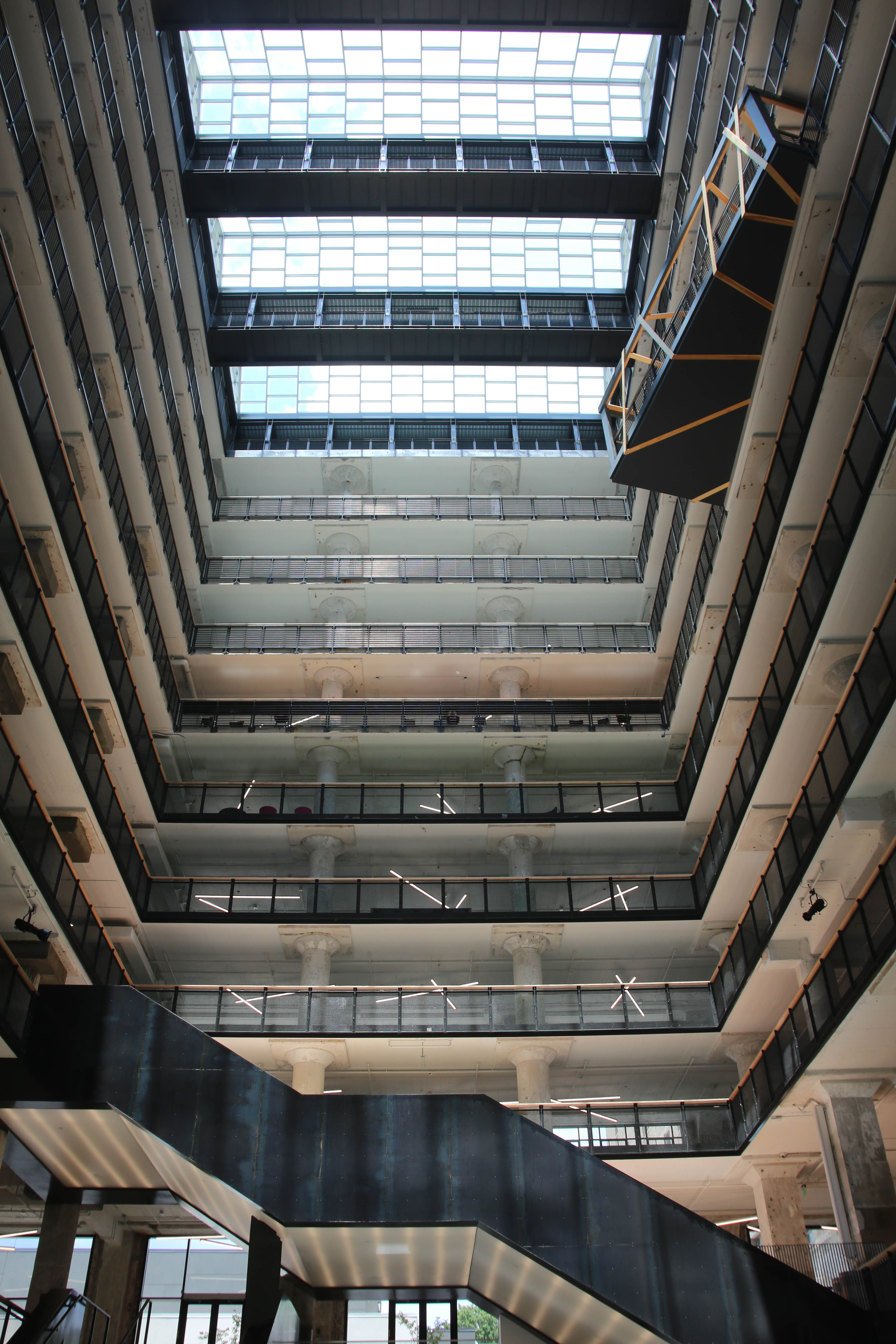
One of the excised atriums (2018)

Approximately 500,000 square feet (46,000 m^{2}) of space was earmarked for excision to provide the building with lightwells and atriums, and the remaining one million to be divided into 600,000 square feet (56,000 m^{2}) for commercial use and 400,000 square feet (37,000 m^{2}) for residential. Bologna Consultants determined that though the building was structurally sound, and asbestos wasn't a large concern, earthquake-girding and restoring the hundreds of windows would need addressing.

In 2015, Richardson enumerated some of the work performed. Already, 17,200 short tons (15,600 t) of concrete, and nine million pounds (4,100,000 kg) of metal had been removed from the site. 3,200 windowpanes; 400,000 bricks; and 2,000 feet (610 m) of suspended scaffolding were earmarked for removal, while 360 miles (580 km) of brick joints were planned for restoration. The renovation of the building occurred from 2015–2017. The brick façade was left in-place.

==== Realization ====
Groundbreaking for the renovation was on February 21, 2015. Metal from the Sears heating system was melted to form the new cornerstone.

After two years of construction costing $200 million, Crosstown Concourse had its grand opening on August 19, 2017—almost 90 years after the building's original debut. The mayors of Memphis (Jim Strickland) and of Shelby County (Mark Luttrell) were in attendance. At 96% capacity, Crosstown Concourse had over 200 residents, 41 tenant businesses, and 700+ new jobs for Memphis.

=== Crosstown Concourse ===
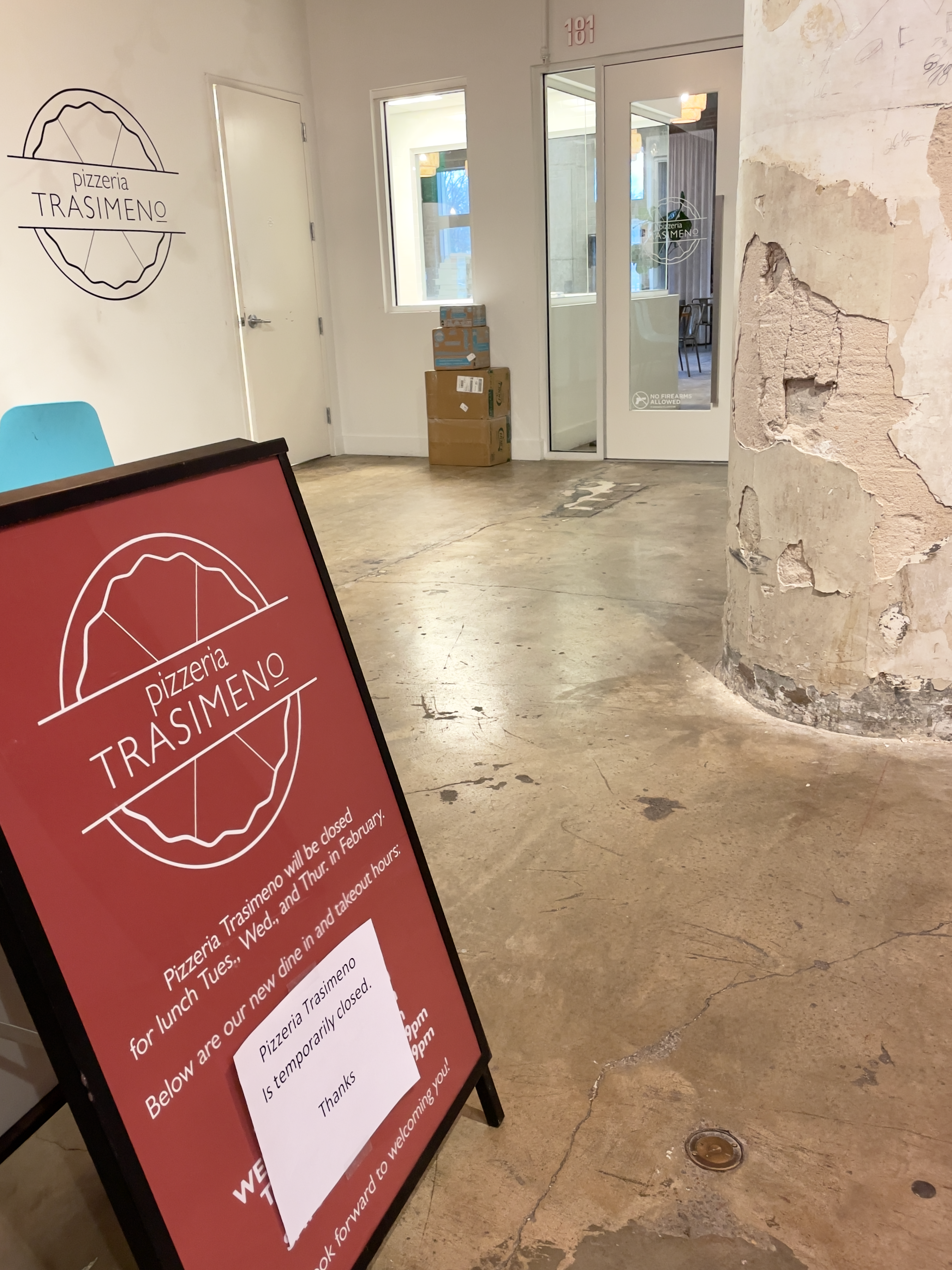
Pizzeria Trasimeno, closed after fire

At 11:55 a.m. on February 25, 2022, an accidental fire broke out at Pizzeria Trasimeno on the east side of the building. Memphis Fire Services extinguished the fire in 16 minutes, which caused no structural damage and an estimated $20,000 (equivalent to $22,000 in 2025) of damage to building contents. The building was evacuated for 50 minutes, and there were no injuries reported.

== Tenants ==
By August 2012, the first nine committed tenants for post-renovation had been secured. Church Health Center was biggest among these, planning to move its entire operation into the 14-story tower, though they would be joined at North Watkins by Methodist Le Bonheur Healthcare, St. Jude Children's Research Hospital, American Lebanese Syrian Associated Charities, and The West Clinic. The other four tenants were to be Gestalt Community Schools, committing to opening a 500-student charter high school; Memphis Teacher Residency, training and housing 100 of their teacher-trainees; Crosstown Arts' artist-residency program, art-making labs, and performance/exhibition spaces; and Rhodes College "send[ing] a flow of students to Sears Crosstown, integrating the health care, arts and grade school into its academic and community outreach programs."

Upon the grand-opening, much of the building's space had been leased: 60% of the retail space, 80% of apartments, and 98% of the office space. Tenants have included:

- Area 51 Ice Cream
- Church Health
- Crosstown High School
- Curb Market
- Farm Burger
- FedEx Office
- Global Café
- Lucy J's Bakery
- Madison Pharmacy
- Mama Gaia's
- nexAir
- The Parcels at Concourse
- Pizzeria Trasimeno
- YMCA
