= Newby's =

Entertainment establishment in Tennessee, U.S.

- Interactive map of Newby's
- Location: 539 S. Highland St., Memphis, Tennessee, United States
- Coordinates: 35.11683°N 89.94592°W
- Capacity: 199
- Public transit: MATA

Construction
- Opened: 1975

Website
- www.newbys901.com

Newby's was a music venue, bar, pool hall, and restaurant in Memphis, Tennessee, located about a block from the University of Memphis.

== History ==
Newby's was established in 1975 by David "Newby" Harsh. The restaurant changed over the years as it expanded with a full bar, pool room, large outside patio and then transforming an adjoining historic 1950s movie theater into a music venue. After suffering a stroke in 1996, Harsh sold Newby's to working bartender Todd Adams in January 1997. In November 2014, Newby's closed after filing for bankruptcy that January, but reopened about a year later. It then closed in November 2015.

=== Acts ===
Many notable acts played the venue. All genres of music were booked at Newby's, from Alternative Rock, Country, Hip-hop, to Electronic. The venue also hosted mixed martial arts fights. Listed are a few past shows:

- Eric Gales
- Funkadelic
- The Incredible Hook
- The Chinese Connection Dub Embassy
- Minivan Blues Band
- Zack Brown
- Cross Canadian Ragweed
- Robert Earl Keen
- John Mayer
- Michael Andello
- Jason Maraz
- Nickel Back
- Muzik Mafia
- Big 'n Rich
- Gretchen Wilson
- They Might Be Giants
- Kid Rock
- Better than Ezra
- Drivin N Cryin
- Keller Williams
- The String Cheese Incident
- moe.
- Del McCoury
- Gillian Welch
- Rehab
- Al Kapone
- Members of Widespread Panic
- Jerry Joseph and the Jackmormons
- Papa Roach
- Creed
- Cowboy Mouth
- Ott
- Dieselboy
- H.I.S.T.O.R.Y.
- Ratatat
- Pete Yorn
- Dionne Ferris
- The North Mississippi Allstars
- The Kudzu Kings
- Davis Coen
- J. D. Westmoreland
- Bobby Rush
- Rufus Thomas
- R. L. Burnside
- Junior Kimbrough
- Jason D Williams
- Todd Snider
- Leftover Salmon
- Prince_(musician)

=== Controversies ===
Beginning in the 1990s, Newby's engaged in a legal dispute with Broadcast Music Inc. (BMI) over license fees levied by BMI for the right to perform music in the BMI catalog. Newby's stopped paying BMI for a yearly license due to Adams' objections to terms of the license agreement. One focus of contention was the venue capacity, which is one determinant of the license fee. BMI based its fee on a capacity of 600, but Adams maintained that Newby's had a legal capacity of only 132 people.

== Facilities ==
The old concert hall had a capacity of several hundred, and the bar/restaurant area offers live music with a capacity of about 200.

Typically, nationally touring bands played the concert hall and small acoustic acts played the bar side. The concert hall was closed in 2015, but the bar side was expanded and the stage improved in order to accommodate larger acts.

== See also ==
- List of concert halls
