= Maximum segment lifetime =

Maximum segment lifetime or MSL is the time a TCP segment can exist in the internetwork system. It was defined in 1981 to be 2 minutes.

For this specification the MSL is taken to be 2 minutes. This is an engineering choice, and may be changed if experience indicates it is desirable to do so.

The specification calls for this value to be used for the "time-wait" interval, the minimum time a system must keep the socket in the TIME_WAIT state before designating the socket closed, thus preventing the socket from being re-used before that interval.

== Values in various operating systems ==
The command that can be used on Solaris systems (prior to v11) to determine the time-wait interval is:

   ndd -get /dev/tcp tcp_time_wait_interval

60000 (60 seconds) is a common value.

On FreeBSD systems this description and value can be checked by the command sysctl:

   sysctl -d net.inet.tcp.msl
   sysctl net.inet.tcp.msl

which gets the result:

   net.inet.tcp.msl: Maximum segment lifetime
   net.inet.tcp.msl: 30000

In Linux, the time-wait interval is defined by the TCP_TIMEWAIT_LEN, hard-coded as 60 seconds. Linux implements several possible optimizations to shorten the TIME_WAIT state through recycling, down to a minimum of 3.5s in recent kernels.
