= FedExForum =

Multi-purpose indoor arena in Memphis, Tennessee, U.S.

- The Grindhouse

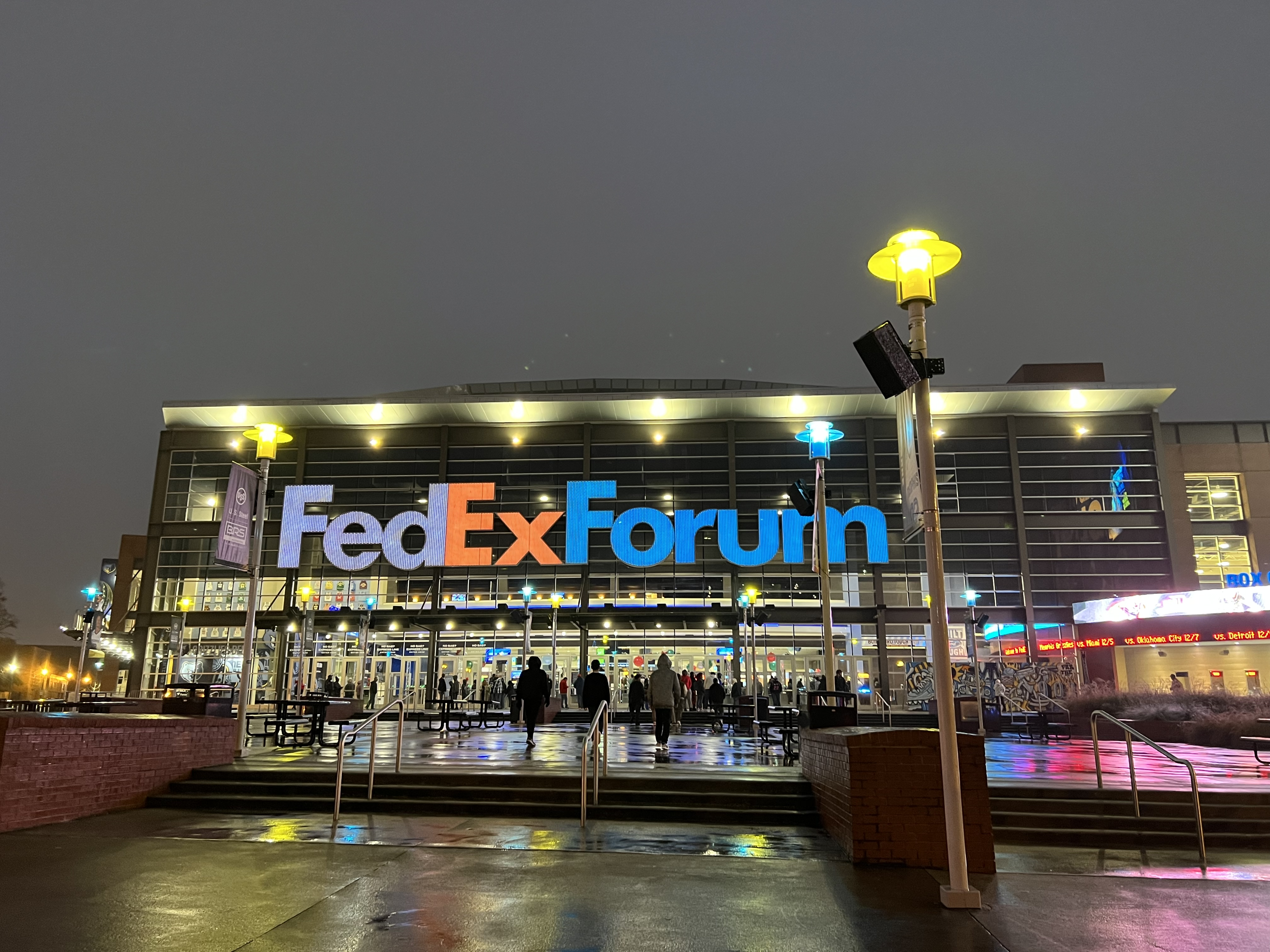
- FedExForum in 2022

- Location in Tennessee Location in the United States
- Interactive map of FedExForum
- Address: 191 Beale Street
- Location: Memphis, Tennessee, U.S.
- Coordinates: 35°8′18″N 90°3′2″W
- Owner: City of Memphis
- Operator: Memphis Basketball, LLC
- Capacity: Basketball: 16,667; Ice hockey: 16,411; Concert: 18,119
- Public transit: Main Street Line at Dr. M.L. King Jr. Avenue

Construction
- Groundbreaking: June 20, 2002
- Opened: September 6, 2004
- Cost: US$250 million ($426 million in 2025 dollars)
- Architects: Ellerbe Becket; Looney Ricks Kiss; Jackson Person & Associates, Inc. Self Tucker Architects Inc.
- Project manager: PC Sports
- Structural engineer: ABS-EQE Structural Engineers
- General contractor: M.A. Mortenson Company

Tenants
- Memphis Grizzlies (NBA) 2004–present Memphis Tigers (NCAA) 2004–present

Website
- fedexforum.com

FedExForum is a multi-purpose indoor arena located in Downtown Memphis, Tennessee. It is the home of the Memphis Grizzlies of the National Basketball Association (NBA) and the NCAA Division I men's basketball program of the University of Memphis, both of whom previously played home games at the Memphis Pyramid. The venue also has the capability of hosting ice hockey games, concerts, and family shows.

The arena officially opened in September 2004 after much debate and also a derecho wind storm on July 22, 2003, that nearly brought down the cranes that were building it near the famed Beale Street. It was built at a cost of US$250 million and is owned by the City of Memphis; naming rights were purchased by one of Memphis's best-known businesses, FedEx, for $92 million. FedExForum was financed using $250 million of public bonds, which were issued by the Memphis Public Building Authority (PBA).

== Design ==
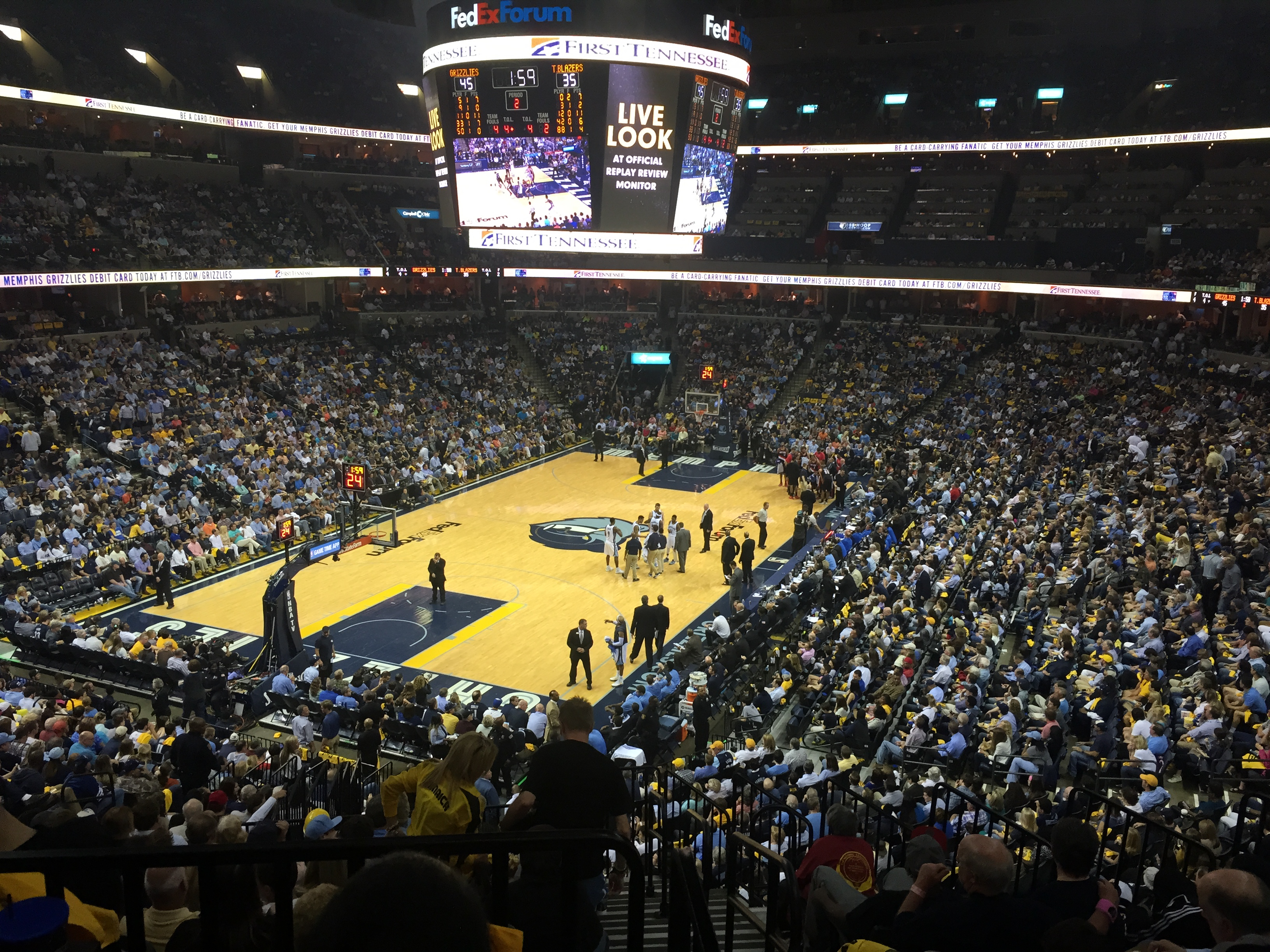
FedExForum during a Memphis Grizzlies basketball game

Before FedExForum was built, Memphis' primary indoor entertainment venue had been The Pyramid, built in 1991. However, when city officials sought to lure either the Vancouver Grizzlies or Charlotte Hornets to Memphis, they discovered that the Pyramid was already obsolete as a potential NBA venue despite being only 10 years old. Retrofitting the Pyramid to NBA standards of the time would have not only been prohibitively expensive, but would have also required shuttering the arena for an entire season. When the Grizzlies moved to Memphis for the 2001–02 season, they temporarily shared the Pyramid with the Memphis Tigers men's basketball team while a new arena was being built.

FedExForum was designed by architectural firm Ellerbe Becket. Concrete work done with the help of Dowco Construction and Apac. The arena is 805,850 ft^{2} (75,000 m^{2}) in size, covering 14 acres (57,000 m^{2}). The Arena is round, with a dome. The playing floor is lower than ground level. It is capable of seating 18,119 for basketball and has 1,000 premiere courtside seats. There are 27 courtside suites, 32 club suites, 4 party suites, and 80 club boxes. It also contains a full-sized practice basketball court, visible from the huge lobby. The plans called for a mass transit bus depot, which brought a federal grant of $6 million, but the depot was changed to a premium parking garage, and Memphis had to return the money.

FedExForum's interior was designed to pay tribute to Memphis' musical heritage, with paintings and murals depicting some of the city's most famous artists including Justin Timberlake, Elvis Presley, and B.B. King. Most of the Arena's restaurants are named in conjunction with FedExForum's overall theme of music with Opus Restaurant and the Blue Note Lounge. The two other restaurants are sponsor-driven with the Lexus Lounge just off the Arena Floor and Jack Daniel's Old No. 7 in the Grand Lobby of the Arena.

FedExForum was the first arena to utilize new "see-through" shot clock units which allow spectators seated behind the basket to see the action without having the clocks interfere with their view. The idea came when a fan of the NBA's New Jersey Nets who sat behind the basket at Continental Airlines Arena sent an e-mail to NBA Commissioner David Stern, asking for technology to improve his view, and Daktronics obliged with the innovation at FedExForum in 2004. The NBA approved the unit a year later for full use and has seen the new units installed at Philadelphia's Wells Fargo Center, Spectrum Center, TD Garden, Moda Center, Capital One Arena, State Farm Arena, and Staples Center after the approval. As of the 2011–12 NBA season every NBA arena had implemented the transparent shot clocks, with Pepsi Center, The Palace of Auburn Hills, Oracle Arena, Target Center, and ARCO Arena being the last NBA arenas to install the clocks.

== Hosted events ==
=== College basketball ===
On February 23, 2008, FedExForum hosted the college basketball game featuring the No. 1 ranked Memphis Tigers vs. the No. 2 ranked Tennessee Volunteers. The facility also hosted the Conference USA men's basketball tournament from 2005 to 2009. It was the site of the South regional semifinals and finals in the 2009, 2014, and 2017 editions of the NCAA Division I men's basketball tournament, and first- and second-round games of the 2024 tournament. FedExForum was one of the four regional finals in the 2010 NCAA Division I women's basketball tournament.

On March 12–15, 2014, the American Athletic Conference hosted their inaugural tournament at the FedExForum. It hosted the tournament again in 2019.

=== Hockey ===
On September 21, 2006, the Nashville Predators and the Columbus Blue Jackets played an NHL preseason game at FedExForum, the first ice hockey game ever held at the arena, won by the Predators 8–1.

=== Boxing, WWE & MMA ===
On September 25, 2004, FedExForum hosted the Roy Jones Jr. vs. Glen Johnson for the IBF Light heavyweight title. Johnson won the fight with a 9th-round knockout.

FedExForum has hosted three major professional wrestling events. In 2007, World Wrestling Entertainment's Unforgiven took place on September 16, headlined by The Undertaker and Mark Henry, and the PMG Clash of Legends independent show on April 27, featuring Hulk Hogan versus Paul Wight. In 2015, it hosted Fastlane on February 22. The first of five WWE house shows took place on September 19, 2004, shortly after the venue opened. It has hosted seven episodes of WWE Raw and four of WWE SmackDown. One notable instance of WWE at the arena was when Daniel Bryan "occupied" Raw with hundreds of his fans inside the ring and surrounding the ringside area on March 10, 2014.

On December 12, 2009, FedExForum hosted an Ultimate Fighting Championship lightweight title fight, UFC 107: Penn vs. Sanchez

=== Other events ===
In August 2010, the Professional Bull Riders' Built Ford Tough Series tour made their first appearance at FedExForum.

On August 4, 2010, FedExForum held the memorial service to Memphis native Lorenzen Wright, a Memphis Tigers alum and former Memphis Grizzlies player.

The Church of God in Christ, Inc. (COGIC), a Holiness-Pentecostal denomination based in Memphis, held their annual Convocation at the FedExForum from 2004 to 2007.

The arena hosted Monster Jam for a few years, then in 2019 hosted Hot Wheels Monster Trucks Live.

== Renovations ==
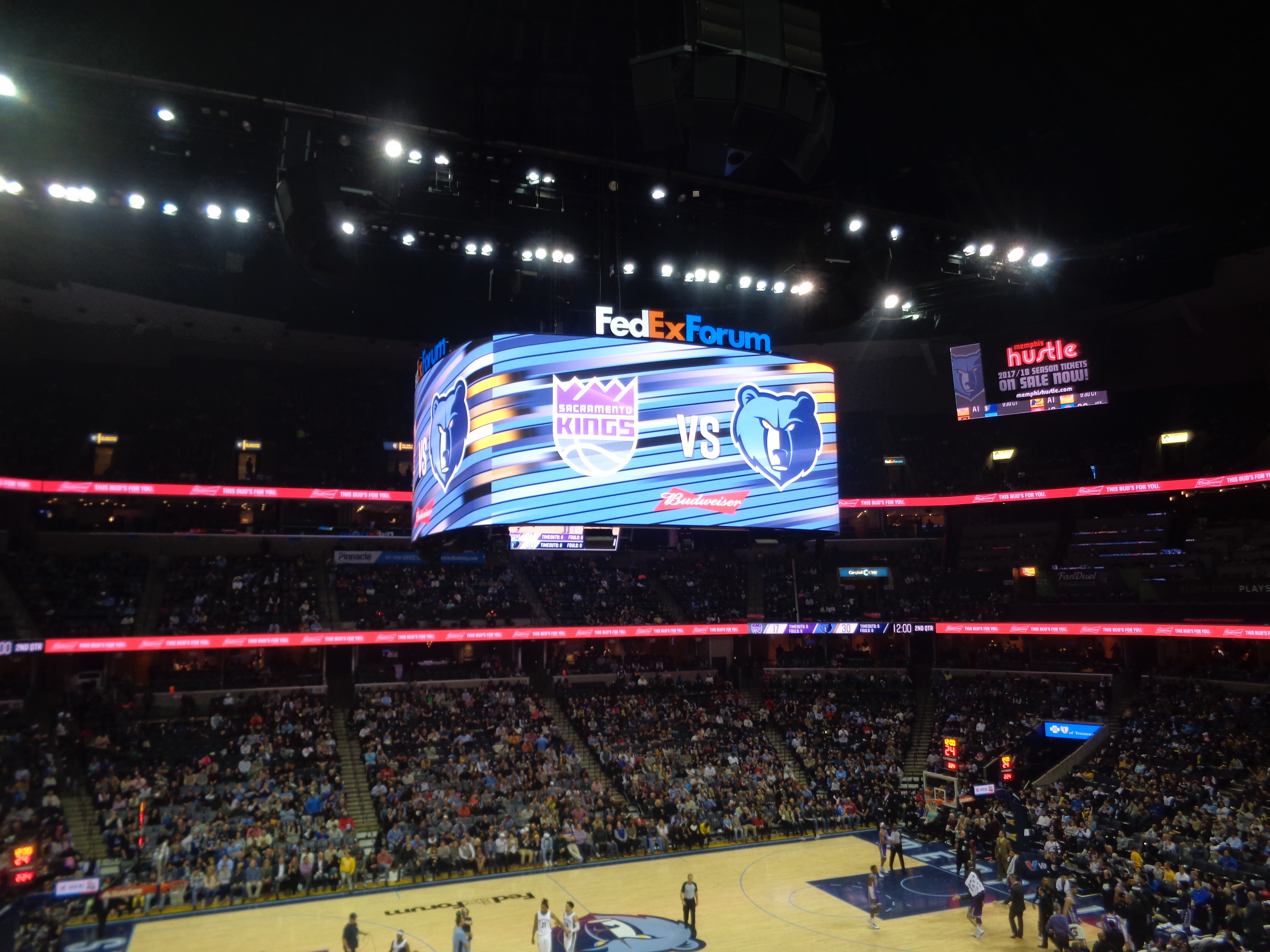
Digital upgrades, which included a new scoreboard, were installed in time for the 2017-18 NBA season.

In order to keep the Grizzlies in Memphis, the City of Memphis has completed normal renovations to FedExForum to keep it up to NBA standards. In 2012, the arena's sound system was replaced and the main basketball court was replaced for the Grizzlies for $200,000, with the Tigers' court being replaced the following year. Three years later, FedExForum completed a renovation for the backstage areas, including a new video room, a renovation of the coaches' offices, and office space for FedExForum employees. In 2017, the Grizzlies announced a $1.8 million renovation to the arena, which includes an HD scoreboard four times the size of the former, new HD displays, new LED lighting, and other additional fan amenities, which were completed in time for the beginning of the 2017-2018 NBA Season.

== See also ==
- List of NCAA Division I basketball arenas
- List of NBA arenas

Events and tenants
| Preceded by Pyramid Arena | Home of the Memphis Grizzlies; 2004 – present | Succeeded by current |
