= Cassina Gambrel Was Missing =

1999 novel by William Watkins

- First edition cover
- Author: William Watkins
- Illustrator: James Richardson (cover photo)
- Cover artist: Montague Ferry Design, NYC
- Language: English
- Genre: Novel
- Publisher: Lynx Publishing Company
- Publication date: 1999
- Publication place: United States
- Media type: Print (hardcover)
- Pages: 192 pp
- ISBN: 0-9668965-0-5

Cassina Gambrel Was Missing is a 1999 novel by William Watkins.

== Plot ==
Set against turbulent events in Memphis, Tennessee in the late 1970s, the novel concerns a young, white, college student named Jackson Taylor who befriends an older black woman named Cassina Gambrel. As the protagonist's fortune and world expands, Cassina's narrows. Years later, Jackson begins a search for his former friend and the book takes on a cynical tone, bordering on bitterness, while the story unfolds through a series of revealing flashbacks.

== Reception and characteristics ==
The novel has been described as part coming-of-age story and part comedy of manners and garnered praise for the author's ability to draw keen characterizations with few words and to juggle a non-linear narrative with skill.
