= Playhouse on the Square =

Regional theatre company in Memphis, Tennessee

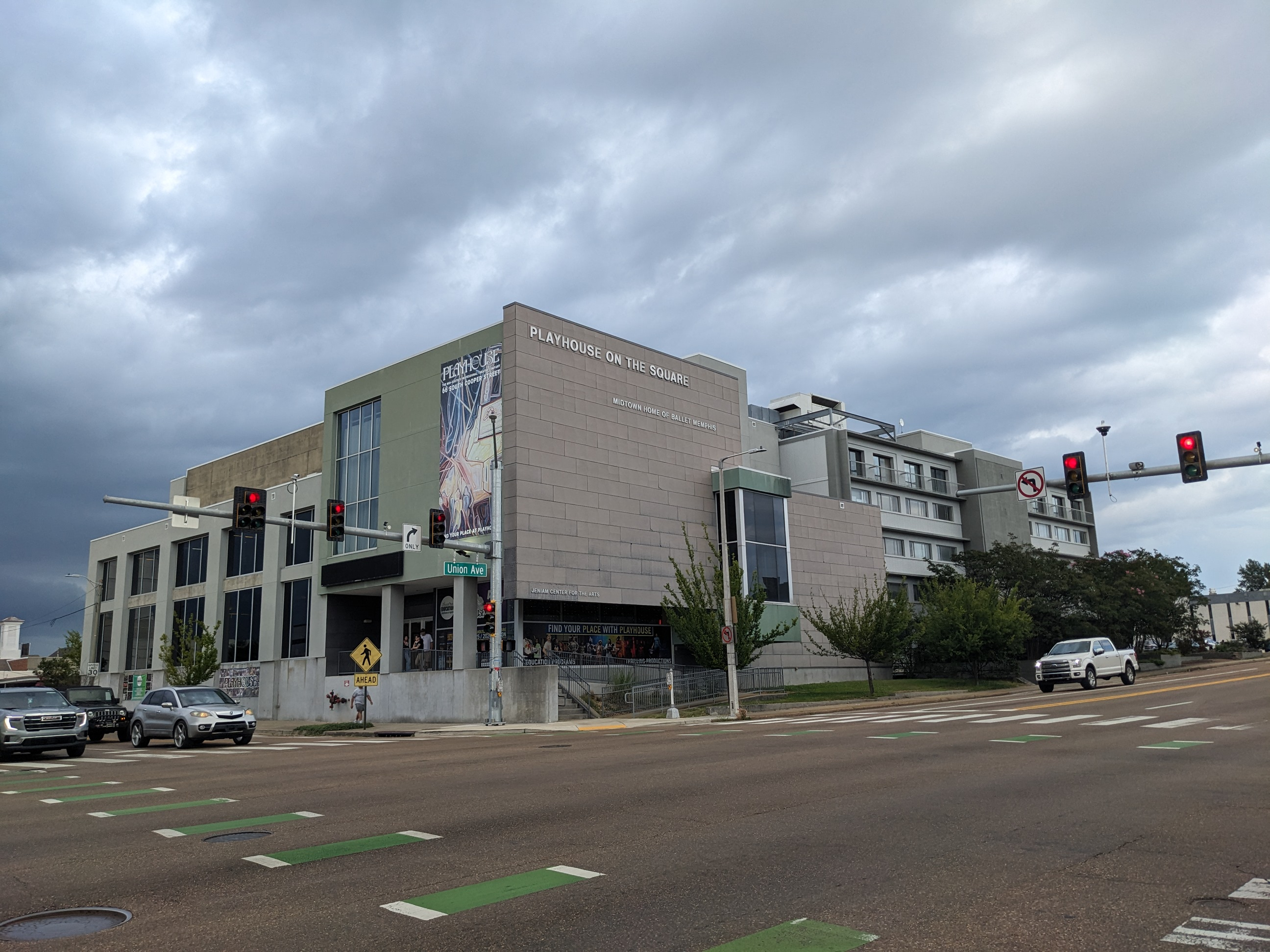
- Playhouse on the Square in 2026
- Interactive map of Playhouse on the Square
- Address: 66 South Cooper Street; Memphis, Tennessee; United States
- Coordinates: 35°8′4.2″N 89°59′24.2″W
- Owner: Circuit Playhouse Inc.
- Capacity: 347
- Type: Regional theatre
- Public transit: MATA

Construction
- Opened: 1969
- Architect: John Morris

Website
- playhouseonthesquare.org

Playhouse on the Square is a regional theatre company located in Memphis, Tennessee. It is owned by Circuit Playhouse, Inc., which operates two other Memphis theaters. While it has its own resident company of professional actors, auditions are still frequently open to the public. The theater has 347 seats on two levels, an orchestra and balcony with boxes, as well as a rooftop terrace, which is open during shows and rented out for private events.

== Buildings ==
Since its founding, Circuit Playhouse, Inc. has acquired multiple theaters in Memphis.

=== New building ===
In January 2010, architect John Morris designed a new building for Playhouse on the Square, located at 66 S. Cooper St., just across from the previous theater (now The Circuit Playhouse). The new building, which cost $12.5 million and includes a 340-seat theater and rehearsal space is connected to an office building which houses various internal theater projects, and headquarters for nonprofit arts organizations such as Indie Memphis. Indie Memphis also uses the Playhouse on the Square theater for its yearly film festival. The money to create the theater was raised through a series of campaigns, the most notable of which was the "Breaking New Ground" capital campaign, which raised most of the money needed to build the new theater.

=== The Circuit Playhouse ===
The Circuit Playhouse is a 218-seat theater located at 51 S. Cooper St., mainly used for smaller productions.

=== TheatreWorks at the Square ===
TheatreWorks is a building one block west of The Circuit Playhouse originally built in 1995 to house a variety of small performance groups unable to afford quarters of their own. Now, emerging artists and performing arts groups may rent the facilities. There are now two buildings under its operation: Theatreworks at the Square at 2085 Monroe Ave., and The Evergreen Theatre (originally the Ritz movie theatre, built in 1927) at 1705 Poplar Ave. (former location of The Circuit Playhouse). Together they have 2 fully-equipped stages, and 3 rehearsal studios.

== Programs and outreach ==
Circuit Playhouse, Inc. maintains several education and outreach programs. The Circuit Playhouse is also home to the Summer Youth Theatre Conservatory, a summer program for children who are interested in learning more about the career of acting.
