= Memphis Sport =

- Cover of the March/April 2007 issue of Memphis Sport Magazine featuring Larry Finch
- Managing Editor: Kevin Cerrito
- Categories: Sports/Fitness
- Frequency: Bi-monthly
- Publisher: Mike Bullard; Kim Bullard
- First issue: July 2006
- Country: USA
- Based in: Cordova, Tennessee
- Language: English
- Website: Memphis Sport

Memphis Sport is a sports and fitness magazine featuring articles on local and regional teams, players and events. In addition, Memphis Sport focuses on health and fitness for an active lifestyle. The magazine debuted in Memphis, Tennessee in July 2006. Local franchises covered include the University of Memphis Tigers, Memphis Redbirds, Mississippi Riverkings and Tennessee Titans.

== Memphis Sport Live ==
Memphis Sport Live (commonly referred to as MSL) is a weekly radio program based on the popular Memphis Sport magazine. It broadcasts live on Sports 56 (WHBQ) at 11 AM Central every Saturday. Hosts Kevin Cerrito and Marcus Hunter are joined each week by various guests and notable local sports experts(often including Memphis broadcasting legend Jack Eaton). During the program Kevin and Marcus recap the week's top 5 stories in the Starting Five, plus they have other regular segments such as The Great Debate, The Cheerleader Interview without the Cheerleader, Old School/New School, What You've Been Missing On MSNBC, and more.
