= Children's Hospital at Erlanger =

Children’s Hospital at Erlanger
- Erlanger Health System

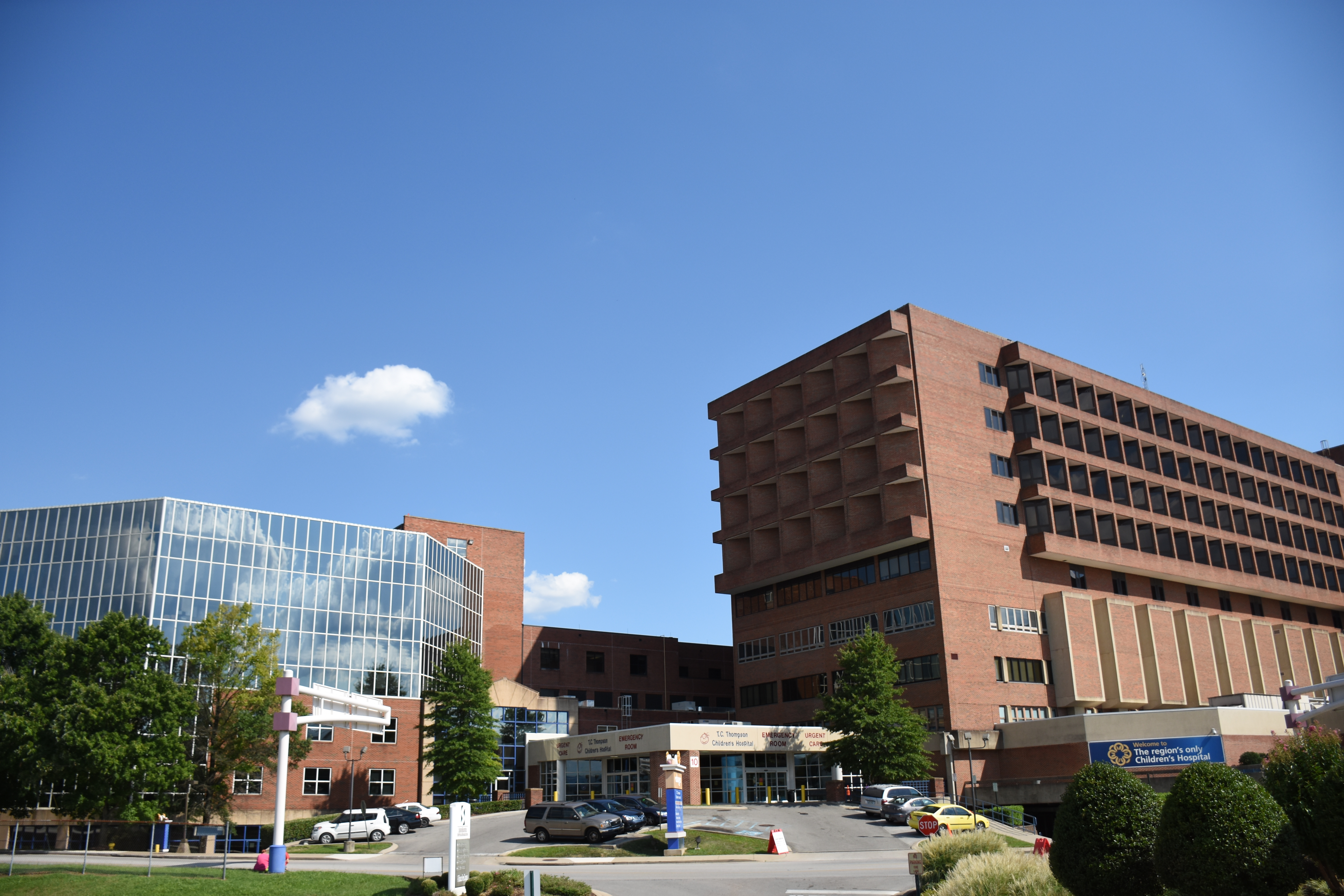
- T.C. Thompson Campus (main)

Geography
- Location: Chattanooga, Tennessee, United States
- Coordinates: 35.0493523°N 85.2923917°W

Organization
- Care system: Public
- Type: Comprehensive Regional Pediatric Center
- Affiliated university: University of Tennessee College of Medicine

Services
- Emergency department: Level I Pediatric Trauma Center
- Beds: 118

History
- Opened: 1929

Links
- Website: https://www.childrensaterlanger.org
- Lists: Hospitals in Tennessee

Children's Hospital at Erlanger is a 118-bed, tertiary care children's hospital located in Chattanooga, Tennessee. The hospital is affiliated with Erlanger, a nonprofit health system also based in Chattanooga. Children's Hospital at Erlanger treats infants, children, teens, and young adults aged 0–21. It is located adjacent to Erlanger Baroness Hospital, just east of downtown.

== History ==
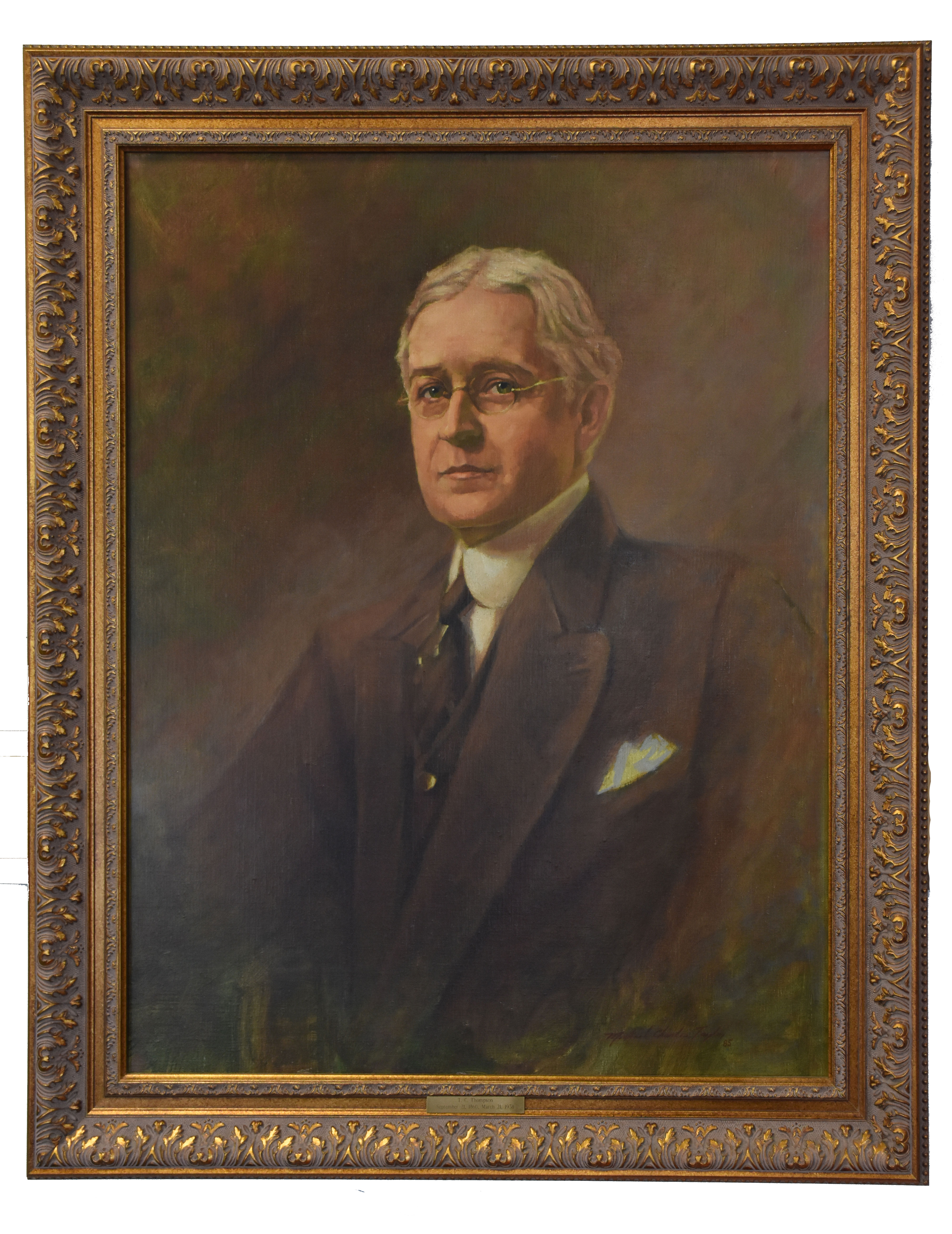
Former Chattanooga mayor T.C. Thompson.

The initiative to create a hospital in Chattanooga for children was spearheaded in the 1920s by the city's former mayor, T.C. Thompson, working closely with the local Civitan Club. Through a $250,000 bond issue, the original children's hospital was completed in 1929 in Chattanooga's Glenwood community. The facility had 89 beds for children and 16 beds for newborn babies. After several years, the children's hospital board merged with the Erlanger hospital board, and the facility was named T.C. Thompson Children's Hospital.

During the 1940s, the hospital pioneered new polio treatments, including hydrotherapy, and opened the region's first unit for premature babies. In 1975, a move to Erlanger's downtown campus made way for the region's first pediatric intensive care unit and Neonatal Intensive Care Unit (NICU). The 2000s saw a tripling of the ER size, the renovation of surgical suites, and the expansion of operating rooms. In 2011, the hospital was renamed Children's Hospital at Erlanger to better reflect its role in the region and as part of Erlanger Health System. With this change, the hospital would continue to honor its founder by naming its downtown pediatric location, the T.C. Thompson Campus.

In December of 2018. Children's Hospital at Erlanger opened the Kennedy Outpatient Center, a 90,000-square-foot pediatric outpatient facility. The facility houses 40 pediatric medical specialties, including cardiology, gastroenterology, pulmonology, neurology, and orthopedics, serving an estimated 60,000 patients annually with outpatient services.

== About ==
=== Overview ===
Founded in 1929, Children's Hospital at Erlanger serves the medical needs of infants, children, and adolescents in a 31,400 square-mile region of Southeast Tennessee, North Georgia, North Alabama, and Western North Carolina. The State of Tennessee has designates the hospital as a Comprehensive Regional Pediatric Center (CRPC), one of four in the state. CRPC is the highest level of certification for pediatric care in Tennessee, indicating the capability to provide comprehensive, specialized medical and surgical care to acutely ill and injured children in the region.

In addition to providing general pediatric care, Children's Hospital has a board-certified medical staff representing 14 pediatric subspecialties (children's medical specialties). Critical care services for children include a 24/7 pediatric emergency department, a pediatric intensive care unit (PICU), and a Level IV neonatal intensive care unit (NICU) for premature and critically ill infants.

=== Academic affiliation ===
Children's Hospital at Erlanger is a pediatric teaching hospital through Erlanger's affiliation with the University of Tennessee Health Science Center. Children's Hospital at Erlanger physicians serve as the pediatrics department for the medical school, providing both specialty and subspecialty training.

=== Pediatric specialties ===
- General Pediatrics
- Adolescent Medicine
- Anesthesia
- Behavioral Health
- Cardiology
- Critical Care
- Dermatology
- Developmental Behavioral Pediatrics
- Endocrinology
- Gastroenterology
- Genetics
- Hematology/Oncology
- Infectious Disease
- Neonatology
- Nephrology & Hypertension
- Neurology
- Neurosurgery
- Orthopaedics
- Pulmonology
- Radiology
- Surgery
- Urology

==== Ancillary services ====
- Child Life Program
- Childhood Healthy Eating and Active Living Center
- Cystic Fibrosis Center
- Social Services

=== Children’s Miracle Network ===
Children's Hospital at Erlanger is a member of the Children's Miracle Network Hospitals, an alliance of 170 children's hospitals across North America. The network's mission is to raise funds and awareness for local children's hospitals.

=== Admissions ===
In fiscal year 2023, Children's Hospital at Erlanger admitted 4,102 pediatric patients, performed 8,063 surgeries, and had 41,211 emergency room visits.

== See also ==
- List of children's hospitals in the United States
