= Baptist Memorial Hospital-Memphis (1912–2000) =

Baptist Memorial Hospital Medical Center

Geography
- Location: Memphis, Tennessee, United States
- Coordinates: 35.1398°N 90.0304°W

Services
- Beds: 2,000

History
- Founded: 1912
- Closed: 2000

Links
- Lists: Hospitals in the United States

The original Baptist Memorial Hospital was a 2,000-bed medical facility and complex of multiple hospital buildings located at 899 Madison Avenue in Midtown Memphis, Tennessee. The facility closed in 2000 after 88 years of service, and was demolished in 2005. With the closure, Baptist transferred their last 12 patients to Baptist Memorial Hospital-Memphis (Formerly known as Baptist East) in eastern Memphis. Baptist later donated the land and buildings to Memphis Bioworks Foundation in 2002, and today the land is owned by the University of Tennessee Health Science Center. It was once the world's largest privately owned hospital.

== History and construction ==
The 7-story 150-bed Baptist Memorial Hospital in Midtown Memphis originally opened on July 22, 1912, and since then was expanded over the years to form what was the largest privately owned hospital in the United States by the mid 20th century. The idea for the hospital was formed at a Shelby County Baptist Association meeting in 1906 when Dr. H.P. Hurt of the Bellevue Baptist Church proposed a new Baptist-sponsored hospital.

In 1914, the hospital was in debt and near closure due to a lack of patients. The hospital's superintendent A.E. Jennings raised $1 million to save the hospital. It was the first hospital to have a hotel for patients, and an office building for doctors. A.E. Jennings retired as superintendent in 1946 and Frank Groner became the hospitals new superintendent in 1946.

In the 1970s, Baptist continued to grow, and in 1979, Baptist East, a satellite hospital, was completed. In 1980, Joseph Powell succeeded Frank Groner as the CEO and administrator, and Baptist began expanding its branches of hospitals across the mid-southern United States.

In 1994 Joseph Powell retired as CEO and president and Stephen C. Reynolds took over as the new 4th CEO and president of Baptist.

=== Physicians & Surgeons Building ===
The Physicians & Surgeons Building (shortened to P&S building) was one of the original buildings, a 110-foot 9-story low-rise building located on 893-909 Madison Avenue. The building was originally constructed in 1919 as an addition for the Baptist Memorial Hospital, but went through several phases until its completion in 1937, and another addition in 1946. Its architecture was of neo-classical design.

=== Madison East and Union East Tower ===
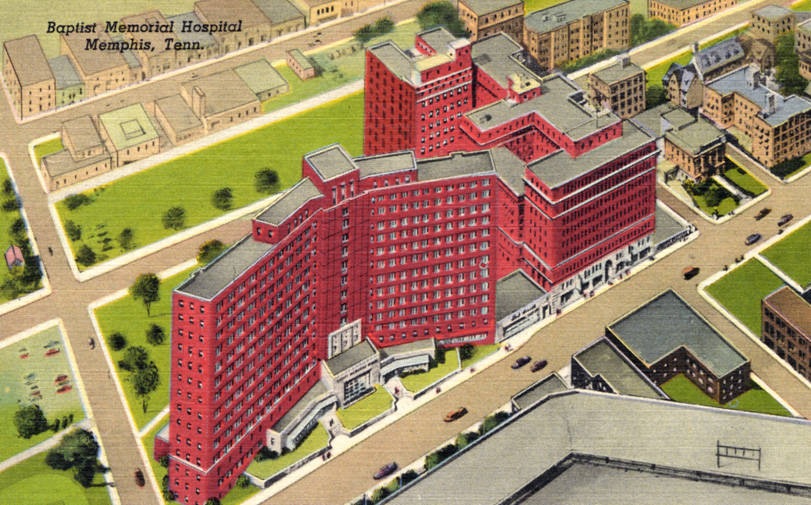
The postcard for the Madison East addition in 1953

The main hospital tower was a 255-foot tall, 924,000 square foot, 1,400-bed, 21-story X-shaped hospital building located at 899 Madison Avenue in the eastern part of the complex. It was constructed as an expansion of the original hospital buildings on Madison Avenue. Planning on the first tower expansion began in 1953 and the 13-story Madison East wing was completed in 1956. As Baptist continued to grow, what was originally planned to grow over 20 years was expanded much faster in the early 1960s. In 1967, the Union East 21-story tower was completed, the Madison East wing was enlarged, and the hospital’s iconic X shape was finalized.

=== Russwood Park fire and professional building expansions ===
During this same time, Russwood Park, a professional baseball park and stadium, was located across the street from the hospital prior to being destroyed by a fire on Easter Sunday, April 17, 1960. This fire also slightly damaged the Madison East tower, breaking several windows and putting the entire hospital at risk. The fire is considered one of Memphis’s largest historical fires, due to it being an all-wood construction stadium and the number of fire companies that ended up responding. With Russwood being a total loss, the baseball park was cleared, Baptist purchased the land and continued to grow. Baptist had a professional doctor’s building on Dudley Street that was built with the hospital addition in 1956, and they built their next set of professional office buildings, 910 and 920 Madison, in 1964 and 1974, with the hospital’s first parking garage attached. The hospital complex was finally completed with the addition of 930 Madison and Madison Plaza in 1991. After closing the hospital in 2000, Baptist donated the professional buildings to the University of Tennessee Health Science Center in 2002. These three buildings, 910, 920, and 930 Madison still stand today and are now academic and research facilities, as well as surgery centers, doctors offices, business offices, and food court.

== Closure and demolition ==
After decades of expansion, Baptist Memorial Healthcare spread to multiple towns across the mid-southern United States. Baptist East completed significant expansions throughout the late 1980s and 1990s that shifted primary services to the East campus and essentially made it the primary hospital of the Baptist system. The original Baptist hospital buildings were in need of significant work and the original portions of the hospital had outlived their useful life. On November 17, 2000, the hospital closed and transferred its last 12 patients to other facilities, ending its 88 years of continual service.

After closing the campus, Baptist donated the hospital facilities to Memphis Bioworks Foundation in 2002. Later, the land was donated to the University of Tennessee Health Science Center after Memphis Bioworks ceased operations.

Demolition of the hospital facilities began in 2005. The Research Laboratory and Physicians & Surgeons Building were both imploded on May 8, 2005. The Madison and Union East tower was demolished via controlled implosion on November 6, 2005, at 6:45 AM by Chandler Demolition and Controlled Demolition, Inc. to make room for a planned biomedical research park. The research park never materialized, and today the land sits mostly vacant except for one building on Dudley Street and the current College of Pharmacy building. The University of Tennessee Health Science Center announced in the summer of 2026 that the site would be home to the new College of Medicine facility.

== See also ==
- Medical District, Memphis
- List of hospitals in Tennessee
