= Medical District, Memphis =

Neighborhood in Memphis, Tennessee

Coordinates: 35.1366°N 90.0147°W

The Memphis Medical District is an area which was created to provide a central location for medical care, serving both Memphis and the Mid-South.

== Geography ==
Relatively small in area, the district is located in Midtown. The Medical District overlaps some of the area known as Crosstown.

== Medical services ==
Anchored by the University of Tennessee Health Science Center, the district is home to major hospitals, emergency rooms, physicians' offices, medical supply manufacturers and distributors, and medical laboratories. It will soon house the headquarters of BioMedical Works. Some of the hospitals and health service providers in this district include:

- Le Bonheur Children's Hospital
- Regional Medical Center
- Methodist School of Radiologic and Imaging Sciences
- Memphis Behavioral Health Center
- VA Memphis
- Baptist College of Health Sciences
- Methodist University Hospital
- Methodist School of Nursing
- University of Tennessee Health Science Center, College of Pharmacy
- Southern College of Optometry
- Southwest TN Community College Health Sciences School
- St. Jude Children's Research Hospital
- University of Tennessee College of Medicine
- University of Tennessee Dental Health College

== See also ==
- List of neighborhoods in Memphis, Tennessee
