= University of Tennessee College of Medicine =

Public medical school in Memphis, Tennessee, US

- Type: Public medical school
- Established: 1850
- Parent institution: University of Tennessee Health Science Center
- Affiliations: University of Tennessee system AAMC
- Dean: Scott Strome, MD
- Academic staff: 945
- Students: 671
- Location: Memphis, Tennessee, U.S. 35°8′27″N 90°1′48″W
- Campus: Urban
- Website: www.uthsc.edu/Medicine

The University of Tennessee College of Medicine is one of six graduate schools of the University of Tennessee Health Science Center (UTHSC) in downtown Memphis. The oldest public medical school in Tennessee, the UT College of Medicine is a LCME-accredited member of the Association of American Medical Colleges (AAMC) and awards graduates of the four-year program Doctor of Medicine (MD) degrees. The college's primary focus is to provide practicing health professionals for the state of Tennessee.

== History ==
The University of Tennessee College of Medicine originated in 1850, but involves several institutional mergers. The first was when the Nashville Medical College, founded in 1876, was acquired by the University of Tennessee in 1879. The modern era of the college began when the Nashville Medical College was moved to Memphis in 1911 and merged with the College of Physicians and Surgeons to become the University of Tennessee College of Medicine. Following a number of mergers with the other medical science colleges, nursing, and dental departments, the then-named University of Tennessee Medical Units was renamed the University of Tennessee Health Science Center during the tenure of Dr. Edmund Pellegrino.

Today, the Humphrey's General Education Building (GEB) stands on the corner of Madison Avenue and Dunlap street, where Lindsley Hall formerly housed the College of Physicians and Surgeons. The oldest surviving building (built in 1926) of the current UTHSC campus is the Wittenborg Anatomy Building, named after Dr. August H. Wittenborg.

In 2012, Steve Schwab announced UTHSC aims to develop more clinical experiences for students in internal medicine, surgery, surgical sub-specialties (e.g., Anesthesiology and Radiology), family medicine, emergency medicine, and obstetrics and gynecology at UTHSC affiliate hospitals in 2013. A partnership with Saint Thomas Health subsequently expanded from one Internal Medicine Residency Program, established in 1982, to include affiliate programs in Emergency Medicine and Family Medicine.

== Facilities ==
The University of Tennessee Medical Center Heart Lung Vascular Institute in Knoxville, TN

The College of Medicine is affiliated with a number of teaching hospitals in Memphis, Knoxville, Chattanooga, and Nashville. The University of Tennessee Health Science Center forms the backbone of the Memphis Medical District and is closely affiliated with several medical units:

- Campbell Clinic in Orthopedics
- Department of Veterans Affairs Medical Center
- Hamilton Eye Institute
- Le Bonheur Children's Medical Center
- Methodist University Hospital
- Regional Medical Center of Memphis (The MED)
- Semmes-Murphey Neurologic and Spine Institute
- St. Jude Children's Research Hospital
- University of Tennessee Medical Group (UTMG)

The Chattanooga campus of the College of Medicine is closely affiliated with Erlanger Health System. In Knoxville, the University of Tennessee Medical Center is home to the UT Graduate School of Medicine, the largest of the nine (AAMC) Graduate Regional Medical Centers in the Southeast United States.

Nashville UTHSC affiliates include Saint Thomas West, Saint Thomas Midtown and Saint Thomas Rutherford Hospitals. Saint Thomas Midtown Hospital is the home of the Internal Medicine Residency Program. An Emergency Medicine Residency Program and a Family Medicine Residency Program are both based at Saint Thomas Rutherford Hospital.

UT medical students spend their first two years in Memphis completing basic science coursework prior to taking the USMLE Step 1. Students then perform clinical rotations at these facilities on the Chattanooga, Knoxville, Memphis and Nashville campuses for third and fourth year clerkships.

== Research ==
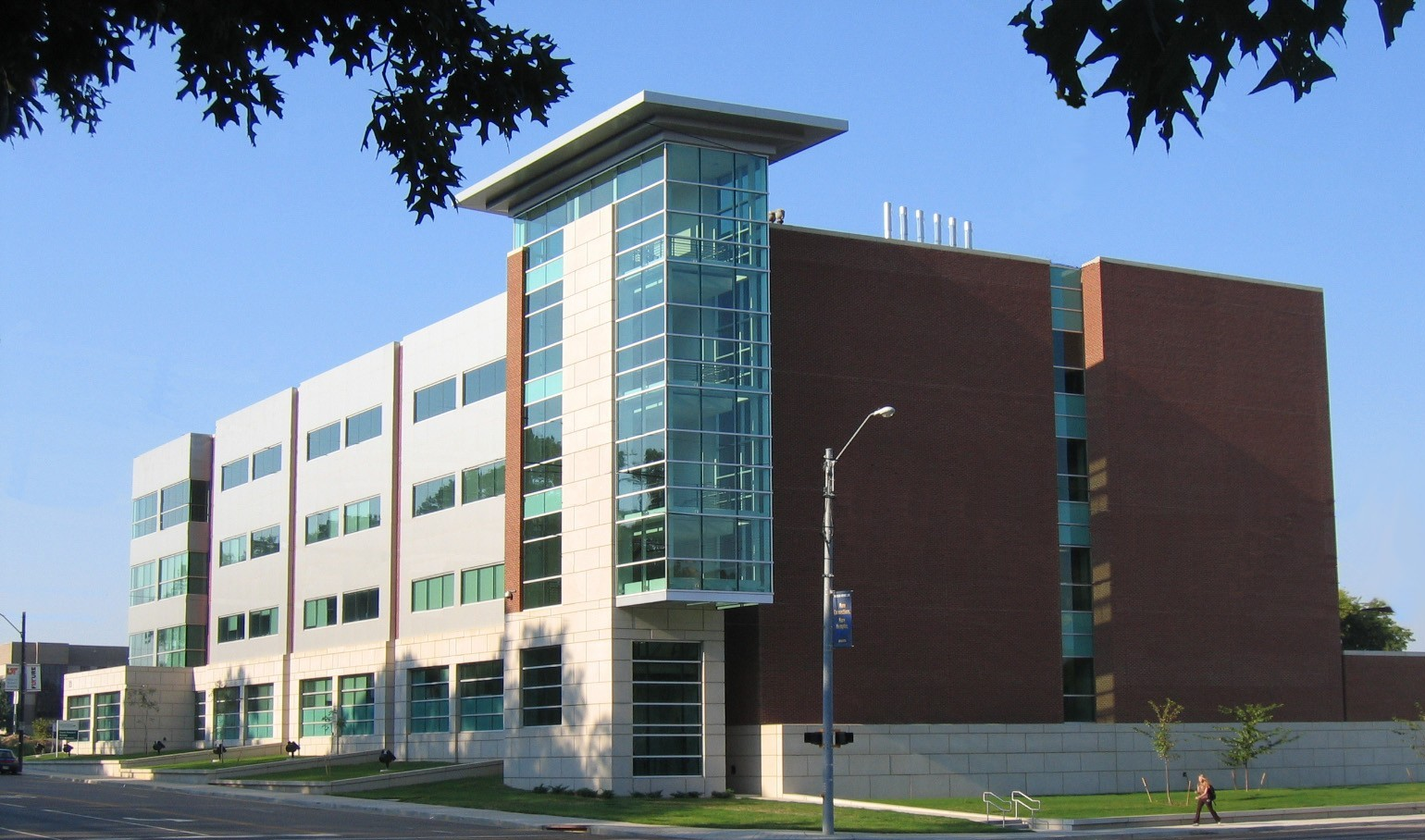
The UTHSC Cancer Research Building, located on the corner of Madison Ave and S Mannassas St in Memphis, TN

- The College of Medicine boasts three centers of excellence for connective tissue diseases, genomics and bioinformatics, and vascular biology. These departments collaborate significantly with St. Jude Children's Research Hospital, Oak Ridge National Laboratory, Le Bonheur Children's Medical Center, and other research centers.
- The UTHSC Level III Regional Biocontainment Laboratory (RBL-3) is one of 13 nationally funded RBL-3 complexes that investigate infectious diseases and pathogens. Funded in 2003 by a $18 million grant from the National Institute of Allergy and Infectious Disease (NIAID), the Regional Biocontainment Laboratory anchors the UT-Baptist Research Park in downtown Memphis.
- The Cancer Research Building (CRB) houses research laboratories which investigate molecular bases of disease, cancer therapeutics, metastasis mechanisms, cancer genetics, viral gene therapy and other fields. Constructed in 2007, the $25.2 million CRB represents the interdisciplinary nature of cancer research conducted by College of Medicine and other UTHSC faculty.
- The College of Medicine affords many medical students research opportunities through the NIH-sponsored Medical Student Research Fellowship (MSRF). This allows medical students to pursue research in the basic and clinical sciences under preceptors during the summer after their first year.
- The Emergency Medicine Residency Program, Family Medicine Residency Program and Internal Medicine Residency Program at UTHSC affiliate hospitals incorporate clinical research education and training into each curriculum. The Saint Thomas Health Research Institute (STRI) supports research in the Nashville area. Research projects in individual locations place an emphasis on community collaboration that benefits local patient populations.

== Residency programs ==
The College of Medicine offers several Accreditation Council for Graduate Medical Education residency programs located at four fully integrated statewide campuses:

- College of Medicine – Memphis: allergy and immunology, emergency medicine, dermatology, family medicine, internal medicine, cardiovascular disease, endocrinology, gastroenterology, infectious disease, nephrology, rheumatology, hematology and oncology, pulmonary disease, neurosurgery, neurology(clinical, child, general, & vascular), OBGYN, ophthalmology, orthopedics (surgery, pediatric, & sports), otolaryngology, pathology, hematology, pediatrics (critical care, emergency medicine, cardiology, endocrinology, nephrology, pulmonology, infectious diseases, internal medicine and urology), plastic surgery, psychiatry, geriatric psychiatry, diagnostic radiology, pediatric radiology, surgery, surgical critical care, pediatric surgery, vascular surgery, & urology
- College of Medicine – Chattanooga: colorectal surgery, emergency medicine, family medicine, geriatric medicine, internal medicine, OBGYN, orthopedic surgery, pediatric surgery, surgery, surgical critical care, vascular surgery, urology & hospice and palliative medicine.
- Graduate School of Medicine – Knoxville offers 11 residency programs through its partnership with the University of Tennessee Medical Center.
- UTHSC – Nashville: emergency medicine, family medicine & internal medicine. There are plans for future expansion in dental, OBGYN and general surgery in 2016.

== Highlights ==
- The College of Medicine is affiliated with three of the six level 1 trauma centers in Tennessee: Erlanger Health Systems in Chattanooga, Regional Medical Center of Memphis, and UT Medical Center in Knoxville.
- The College of Medicine has graduated several notable alumni, including astronaut Margaret Rhea Seddon, Tennessee congressman Phil Roe, and current Director of the Vanderbilt Diabetes Center, Alvin Powers, among others.
- Peter C. Doherty, winner of the 1996 Nobel Prize in Physiology or Medicine is an adjunct faculty member for the College of Medicine's pediatric department.
- Francis M. Fesmire, Clinical Research Director of the Emergency Medicine Residency Program at the College of Medicine in Chattanooga; received the 2006 Ig Nobel Prize in Medicine for his research on unorthodox treatment of intractable hiccups.
- Apple Inc. founder Steve Jobs underwent a complete liver transplant at Methodist University Hospital. James D. Eason, M.D., an alumnus and professor of Transplant Surgery at the College of Medicine successfully performed the surgery in 2009.
