= University of Tennessee Medical Center =

- University Health Systems Inc. (UHS)

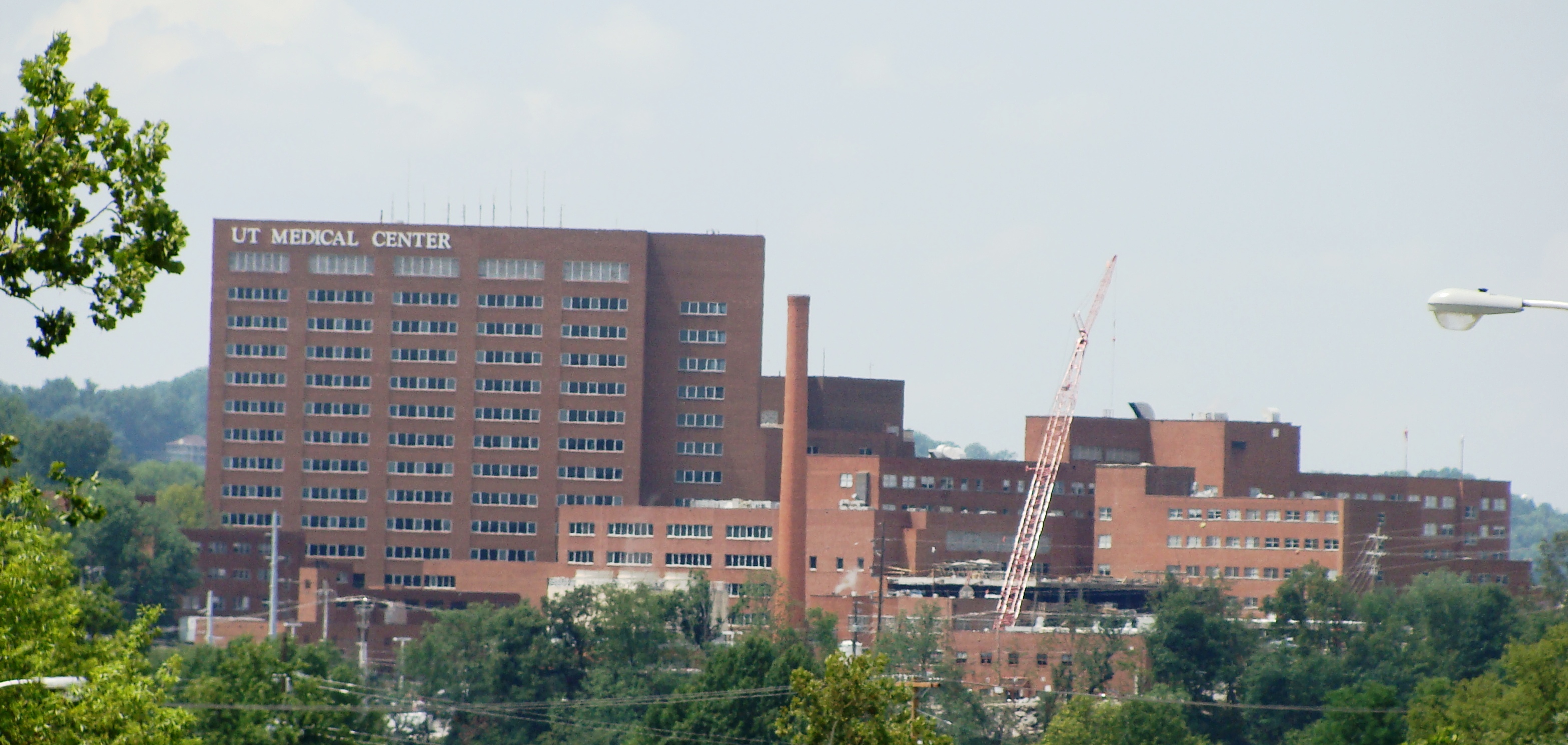

Geography
- Location: Knoxville, Tennessee, United States
- Coordinates: 35°56′26″N 83°56′36″W

Organization
- Type: Teaching
- Affiliated university: UT College of Medicine

Services
- Emergency department: Adult Level I Pediatric Level I
- Beds: 855

Helipads
- Helipad: IATA: 09TN (private)

History
- Founded: August 9, 1956 (70 years ago)

Links
- Website: http://www.utmedicalcenter.org/
- Lists: Hospitals in Tennessee

The University of Tennessee Medical Center (UTMC) is an 855-bed academic medical center located in Knoxville, Tennessee and serves as a referral center for East Tennessee and regions in Kentucky and North Carolina. The University of Tennessee Health Science Center (UTHSC) College of Medicine, Knoxville oversees medical student education and University of Tennessee Graduate School of Medicine (UTGSM) oversees resident training at UTMC. In addition to being a Level I Trauma Center, UTMC is recognized as a center for primary stroke, biomedical imaging, adult & children transplantation, pediatric dialysis, and kidney failure. In 2010, UTMC opened East Tennessee's first dedicated heart hospital.

== History ==
UTMC first opened its doors on August 7, 1956, as the University of Tennessee Memorial Hospital. By the 1960s, the hospital acquired more facilities for research, patient care, and residency training. In 1971 the UT Board of Trustees allowed 20 senior medical students from the University of Tennessee College of Medicine to train at UTMC. The hospital saw technological advancements in the 1980s with construction of the Boling Pavilion, the implementation of the area's first emergency response helicopter (Lifestar), and other specialty advancements. In 1991, the UT Board of Trustees assigned the hospital's primary roles of patient care and medical education to University Memorial Hospital and the UT Graduate School of Medicine, respectively. The facility is currently under expansion, with plans to add nearly 50 beds to the Heart Hospital.

== Facilities ==
UTMC campus in November 2026

The 855-bed University of Tennessee Medical Center comprises several medical units:

- Centers of Excellence:
  - Advanced Orthopaedic Center
  - Brain and Spine Institute
  - Cancer Institute
  - Primary Care Collaborative
  - Center for Women & Infants
  - Emergency and Trauma Center
  - Heart Lung Vascular Institute
- Intensive Care Units
  - 2 Trauma/Surgical ICUs
  - 1 Medical ICU
  - 1 Neuro ICU
  - 1 Cardiovascular ICU
- Boling Tower
- Preston Medical Library

== UT Graduate School of Medicine ==
The UT Graduate School of Medicine (UTGSM) oversees graduate medical education and medical students. 250 resident physicians, dentists, and fellows engage in the 12 residency and 11 fellowship programs at UTMC. Additionally, UTGSM provides clinical clerkship rotations and electives at UTMC for third and fourth year medical students of UT College of Medicine in Memphis. UTGSM features a Medical Simulation Center where physicians and students increase their medical skills.

== See also ==
- University of Tennessee
- University of Tennessee College of Medicine
