= William E. Evans (pharmacist) =

American pharmacist

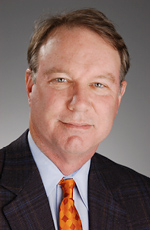
Bill Evans

Dr. William E. Evans, Pharm.D. served as St. Jude Children’s Research Hospital’s fifth director and CEO from 2004 to 2014. From 1986 to 2002, he chaired the St. Jude Department of Pharmaceutical Sciences, and from 2002 to 2004 served as the hospital’s scientific director and executive vice president. He also currently holds the St. Jude Professorship and Endowed chair at the University of Tennessee College of Medicine and Pharmacy.

Evans received his doctoral degree (Pharm.D.) from the University of Tennessee College of Pharmacy (1975), and spent a sabbatical year at the University of Basel (1987–88) studying pharmacogenomics. He received an honorary doctor of science degree (honoris causa) from Ohio State University in 2008.

Evans' research is on the pharmacodynamics and pharmacogenomics of anticancer agents in children, exploring genetic and biochemical mechanisms underlying differences in drug effects among children. Evans has received three consecutive NCI MERIT Awards from the National Institutes of Health for his research of antileukemic agents in children. He has received several national and international awards for his research, including the Leon Goldberg Award in 1991 and the Rawls Palmer Progress in Medicine Award in 2006 from the American Society for Clinical Pharmacology and Therapeutics, the Therapeutic Frontiers Lecture Award in 1989 and the Russell Miller Research Award in 1992 from the American College of Clinical Pharmacy (ACCP) and the Volwiler Research Award in 1994 from the American Association of Colleges of Pharmacy, the Research Achievement Award in 1996 and the Tyler Prize in 2002 from the American Pharmacists Association (APhA). He is an elected fellow of the American Association for the Advancement of Science (AAAS), the American Association of Pharmaceutical Scientists and the ACCP. He has also held elected offices as president of the ACCP (1982) and chair of AAAS’s Pharmaceutical Sciences Section (2009–10). He was elected to the Institute of Medicine of the U.S. National Academy of Sciences in 2002. With citations of his publications ranking among the top one percentile of scientists worldwide in his field, Evans is recognized by ISI as a “Highly Cited Scientist”. He has authored over 300 scientific publications and book chapters.

Under his leadership, St. Jude has expanded its research focus to include Chemical Biology and Therapeutics, Epidemiology and Cancer Control, and has exploited new technologies to further elucidate the genomic basis of childhood cancers and to develop individualized approaches to cancer treatment through translation of pharmacogenomic discoveries into innovative treatment protocols of childhood cancers.

During his tenure as CEO, St. Jude has been consistently ranked among the top ten Best Places to Work in Academia by The Scientist magazine including their No. 1 ranking in 2006, and was ranked the No. 1 Children’s Cancer Hospital by Parent Magazine in 2009. In 2008, St. Jude was awarded comprehensive status by NCI, making it the only NCI Comprehensive Cancer Center devoted solely to children.
