= List of professional sports teams in Tennessee =

Tennessee is the 15th most populated state in the United States and has a rich history of professional sports.

== Active teams ==
=== Major league teams ===
Tennessee is home to four major professional sports teams. Three of the teams are located in Nashville and one of the teams is located in Memphis.

American football
League	Team	City	Stadium	Capacity
NFL	Tennessee Titans	Nashville	Nissan Stadium	69,143
Basketball
League	Team	City	Arena	Capacity
NBA	Memphis Grizzlies	Memphis	FedExForum	17,794
Ice Hockey
League	Team	City	Arena	Capacity
NHL	Nashville Predators	Nashville	Bridgestone Arena	17,159
Soccer
League	Team	City	Stadium	Capacity
MLS	Nashville SC	Nashville	Geodis Park	30,109

=== Other professional sports teams ===
Arena football
League	Team	City	Arena	Capacity
AF1	Nashville Kats	Clarksville	F&M Bank Arena	5,000
Baseball
League	Team	City	Stadium	Capacity
IL (AAA)	Memphis Redbirds	Memphis	AutoZone Park	10,000
IL (AAA)	Nashville Sounds	Nashville	First Horizon Park	8,500
SL (AA)	Chattanooga Lookouts	Chattanooga	Erlanger Park	8,032
SL (AA)	Knoxville Smokies	Knoxville	Covenant Health Park	6,355
Ice hockey
League	Team	City	Arena	Capacity
SPHL	Knoxville Ice Bears	Knoxville	Knoxville Civic Coliseum	6,500
Rodeo
League	Team	City	Arena	Capacity
PBR	Nashville Stampede	Nashville	Bridgestone Arena	17,159
Soccer
League	Team	City	Stadium	Capacity
MLSNP	Chattanooga FC	Chattanooga	Finley Stadium	20,412
USL1	Chattanooga Red Wolves SC	Chattanooga	CHI Memorial Stadium	2,500
USL1	One Knoxville SC	Knoxville	Covenant Health Park	6,355

=== Map of cities with a professional sports team ===
Location with a professional sports team

== See also ==
- Sports in Tennessee
