= Children's Foundation Research Center =

U.S. nonprofit organization

Children's Foundation Research Institute
- Formation: 1995
- Founder: Children's Foundation of Memphis
- Type: NGO
- Legal status: Research Center
- Purpose: Research & Development
- Headquarters: Memphis, Tennessee
- Location: USA
- Staff: 2,300
- Volunteers: 750
- Website: www.lebonheur.org/locations/children-s-foundation-research-institute

Children's Foundation Research Institute is a partnership between the Children's Foundation of Memphis, the University of Tennessee Health Science Center, and Le Bonheur Children's Hospital. This non-profit clinical and research organization was created in 1995 to provide infrastructure, expertise, support and coordination to facilitate basic, clinical and translational research to improve the health of children.

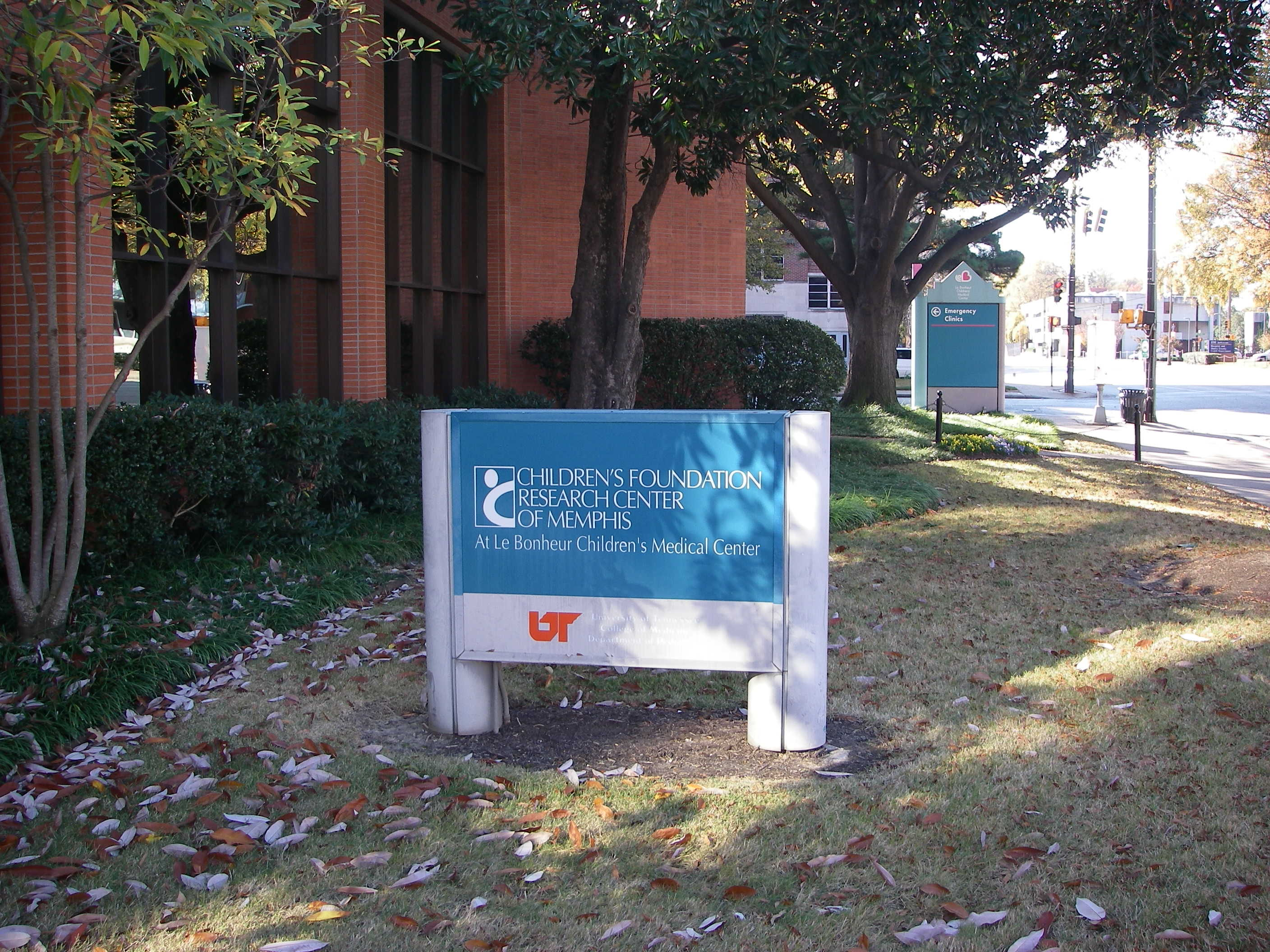
Sign on Dunlap St.
