= Alex Dopico =

Argentinian pharmacologist and Professor

Alex M. Dopico is an Argentinian pharmacologist and the current Distinguished Professor and Dean of the University of Tennessee Health Science Center. His current research includes ion-electrical cells' behavior on amphipathic compounds.
