= Peter Buckley =

Peter Buckley may refer to:

- Peter Buckley (boxer) (born 1969), English journeyman welterweight boxer
- Peter J. Buckley (born 1957), Oregon State Representative, District 5 (2004–2017)
- Peter Buckley (cyclist) (1944–1969), British professional racing cyclist
- Peter Buckley (academic) (born 1949), British professor of multinational enterprise and international business
- Peter F. Buckley, American psychiatrist
