= UT Health Science Center =

UT Health Science Center may refer to either of two state health science centers:

- University of Tennessee Health Science Center
- University of Texas Health Science Center at San Antonio
