= Baptist Memorial Hospital-Memphis =

- Baptist Memorial Health Care
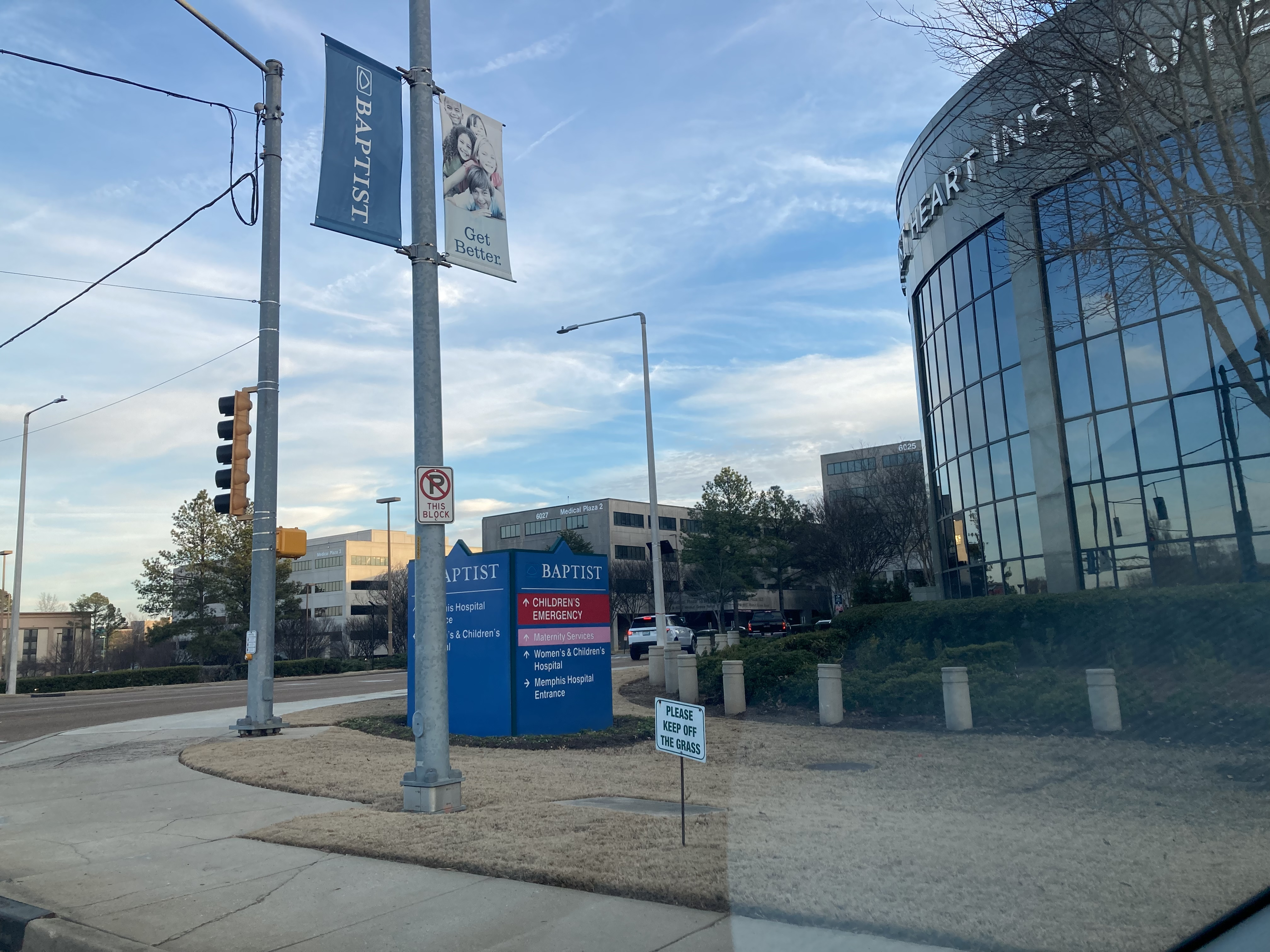
- The entrance of Baptist Memorial Hospital on Walnut Grove Road

Geography
- Location: Memphis, Tennessee, United States
- Coordinates: 35.1305°N 89.861437°W

Organization
- Care system: Medicare (US), Medicaid
- Type: District General

Services
- Emergency department: Yes
- Beds: 706

History
- Founded: 1979

Links
- Website: Website
- Lists: Hospitals in Tennessee

Baptist Memorial Hospital-Memphis (formerly known as Baptist East) is a 706-bed general hospital in Memphis, Tennessee. It is the flagship hospital of Baptist Memorial Health Care and serves as a tertiary care referral center. The hospital is located on an 80-acre campus in East Memphis that includes Baptist Memorial Hospital for Women, Spence and Becky Wilson Baptist Children's Hospital, Baptist Memorial Restorative Care Hospital, Baptist Heart Institute, and physician office buildings.

== History ==
This hospital, built in 1979, became the flagship of Baptist Memorial Health Care following the closure of the Madison Campus in the Medical District, Memphis in 2000, which dated from 1912. Baptist Memorial Hospital-Memphis serves as the flagship hospital of Baptist Memorial Health Care, a regional health system serving communities across Tennessee, Mississippi, and Arkansas. The former Madison Campus has been redeveloped by the University of Tennessee Health Science Center.

== Services and facilities ==
Baptist Memorial Hospital-Memphis provides emergency care and a range of specialty services including heart and vascular care, cancer care, brain and neurosciences, women's health, rehabilitation services, and diagnostic imaging.

The hospital's campus includes Baptist Memorial Hospital for Women, Spence and Becky Wilson Baptist Children's Hospital, Baptist Memorial Restorative Care Hospital, Baptist Heart Institute, and physician office buildings.

== Education and training ==
Baptist Memorial Hospital-Memphis serves as a clinical training site for medical residents and students through affiliations with the University of Tennessee Health Science Center and Baptist Memorial Health Care's graduate medical education programs.

Baptist Memorial Health Care also operates Baptist Health Sciences University, a health sciences university located in Memphis near the site of the former Baptist Memorial Hospital Madison Avenue campus.

== See also ==
- List of hospitals in Tennessee
