= Maury Regional Medical Center =

Maury Regional Health

Geography
- Location: Columbia, Tennessee, Southern Middle Tennessee, Tennessee, United States

Organization
- Type: General medical

Services
- Beds: 305

History
- Opened: 1953

Links
- Website: http://www.mauryregional.com
- Lists: Hospitals in Tennessee

Maury Regional Health is a not-for-profit regional health system serving southern Middle Tennessee through its hospitals, clinics, surgery centers, outpatient facilities and physician practice group.

Maury Regional Health is the largest health care provider between Nashville, Tennessee and Huntsville, Alabama, with approximately 3,000 employees throughout the system.

== History ==
Maury Regional Medical Center opened as Maury County Hospital on December 16, 1953. It initially had 102 patient beds.

In 2023, the system announced a new construction project to expand and renovate its facilities.

== Affiliates ==
Old logo

- Maury Regional Medical Center (Columbia, TN)
- Marshall Medical Center (Lewisburg, TN))
- Wayne Medical Center (Waynesboro, TN)
- Maury Regional Medical Group
- Lewis Health Center (Hohenwald, TN)
- Vanderbilt University Medical Center
