= Baptist Memorial Hospital for Women =

Women's hospital in Memphis, Tennessee, U.S.

- Baptist Memorial Health Care

Geography
- Location: 6225 Humphreys Boulevard, Memphis, Tennessee, United States
- Coordinates: 35.128004°N 89.855991°W

Organization
- Type: Specialist

Services
- Speciality: Women's health

History
- Founded: 2001

Links
- Website: www.baptistonline.org/locations/womens
- Lists: Hospitals in Tennessee

Baptist Memorial Hospital for Women is a specialty hospital in Memphis, Tennessee, operated by Baptist Memorial Health Care. The facility opened in May 2001 as a 140-bed freestanding women's hospital.

The hospital provides maternity and high-risk pregnancy care, neonatal intensive care, breast health services, minimally invasive gynecologic surgery, and other women's health services.

== History ==
The hospital opened in May 2001 on a 9-acre site in Memphis. Designed by Earl Swensson Associates, the five-story, 260,906-square-foot building opened with 140 beds. The project cost $71 million, excluding land and including equipment and furnishings.

At the time it opened, the hospital was one of approximately 15 freestanding women's hospitals in the United States. Its original clinical areas included neonatal intensive care, postpartum and gynecologic care, labor and delivery, high-risk pregnancy care, and operating rooms.

== Services and facilities ==
The hospital's maternity program includes high-risk pregnancy care, labor and delivery, a 48-bed mother/baby unit, and a 40-bed neonatal intensive care unit with micropreemie and continuing-care units. The hospital is connected to the adjacent Spence and Becky Wilson Baptist Children's Hospital, which provides continuing pediatric care for infants born at the women's hospital.

Other services include breast health and diagnostic services, gynecologic and urogynecologic surgery, bone-density screening, and physical therapy for pelvic floor disorders and lymphedema.

== Education and training ==
Baptist Memorial Hospital for Women is the primary training site for Baptist Memorial Medical Education's four-year obstetrics and gynecology residency program. The program provides clinical and surgical training in obstetrics, maternal-fetal medicine, gynecologic oncology, gynecologic pelvic disorders, and reproductive endocrinology and infertility.

== Quality and recognition ==
In 2006, the hospital received a citation of merit in the American Hospital Association–McKesson Quest for Quality Prize. Hospital staff reported in a 2006 article in the Joint Commission Journal on Quality and Patient Safety that the Institute of Medicine's six quality dimensions had been incorporated into the hospital's quality plan and strategic plan. They also reported that the time from arrival to departure for screening mammography decreased from two hours in 2003 to 30 minutes in April 2006.

In 2025, the Leapfrog Group included Baptist Memorial Hospital for Women and Spence and Becky Wilson Baptist Children's Hospital jointly among its Top Hospitals.
