= List of hospitals in Nashville, Tennessee =

This is a list of hospitals in Nashville, Tennessee (U.S. state), sorted alphabetically.

== Hospitals ==
- The Children's Hospital at TriStar Centennial
- Millie E. Hale Hospital (1916–1938)
- Monroe Carell Jr. Children's Hospital at Vanderbilt
- Nashville General Hospital
- Riverside Sanitarium and Hospital (Closed; historical site)
- Ascension Saint Thomas Midtown
- Ascension Saint Thomas West
- TriStar Centennial Medical Center
- TriStar Skyline Medical Center
- TriStar Southern Hills Medical Center
- TriStar Summit Medical Center (Hermitage)
- Vanderbilt Psychiatric Hospital
- Vanderbilt Stallworth Rehabilitation Hospital
- Vanderbilt University Medical Center
- Veterans Affairs Medical Center (Nashville)

== See also ==
- List of hospitals in Tennessee
