= Baptist Health Sciences University College of Osteopathic Medicine =

American osteopathic medical school

- Type: Private, nonprofit, medical school
- Established: 2023
- Parent institution: Baptist Health Sciences University
- Affiliations: Baptist Memorial Health Care
- President: Hampton Hopkins
- Dean: Peter Bell
- Location: Memphis, Tennessee, United States; 35.13912°N 90.02957°W
- Campus: Urban
- Nickname: BUCOM
- Website: www.baptistu.edu/medicine

The Baptist Health Sciences University College of Osteopathic Medicine (BUCOM) is the private medical school of Baptist Health Sciences University. The campus is located Memphis. The school was established in 2023, and holds pre-accreditation status with the American Osteopathic Association's Commission on Osteopathic College Accreditation.

== History ==
BUCOM was founded in 2023. In 2024, the inaugural class began courses. Upon its opening, BUCOM was the second osteopathic medical school in Tennessee.

== Campus ==
The campus was renovated at a cost of $34 million for the medical school. The campus building for BUCOM consists of 100,000 square feet.

== See also ==
- List of medical schools in the United States
