= Clinical Schizophrenia & Related Psychoses =

- Discipline: Psychiatry
- Language: English
- Edited by: Peter F. Buckley

Publication details
- History: 2007–present
- Publisher: Walsh Medical Media (part of OMICS Group)
- Frequency: Quarterly

Standard abbreviations
- ISO 4: Clin. Schizophr. Relat. Psychoses

Indexing
- ISSN: 1935-1232 (print); 1941-2010 (web)
- LCCN: 2006216740
- OCLC no.: 76970559

Links
- Journal homepage; Online archive

Clinical Schizophrenia & Related Psychoses is a quarterly peer-reviewed medical journal published by Walsh Medical Media, a subdivision of the predatory OMICS Publishing Group. It covers research in all areas of psychiatry, especially schizophrenia, bipolar disorder, and related psychoses. The editor-in-chief is Peter F. Buckley (Virginia Commonwealth University).

== Abstracting and indexing ==
The journal was abstracted and indexed in MEDLINE/PubMed (2010–2019) and Scopus (2007–2022), but discontinued by both.

== See also ==
- List of psychiatry journals
- Schizophrenia Bulletin
