= Erlanger (hospital system) =

- Hospital System
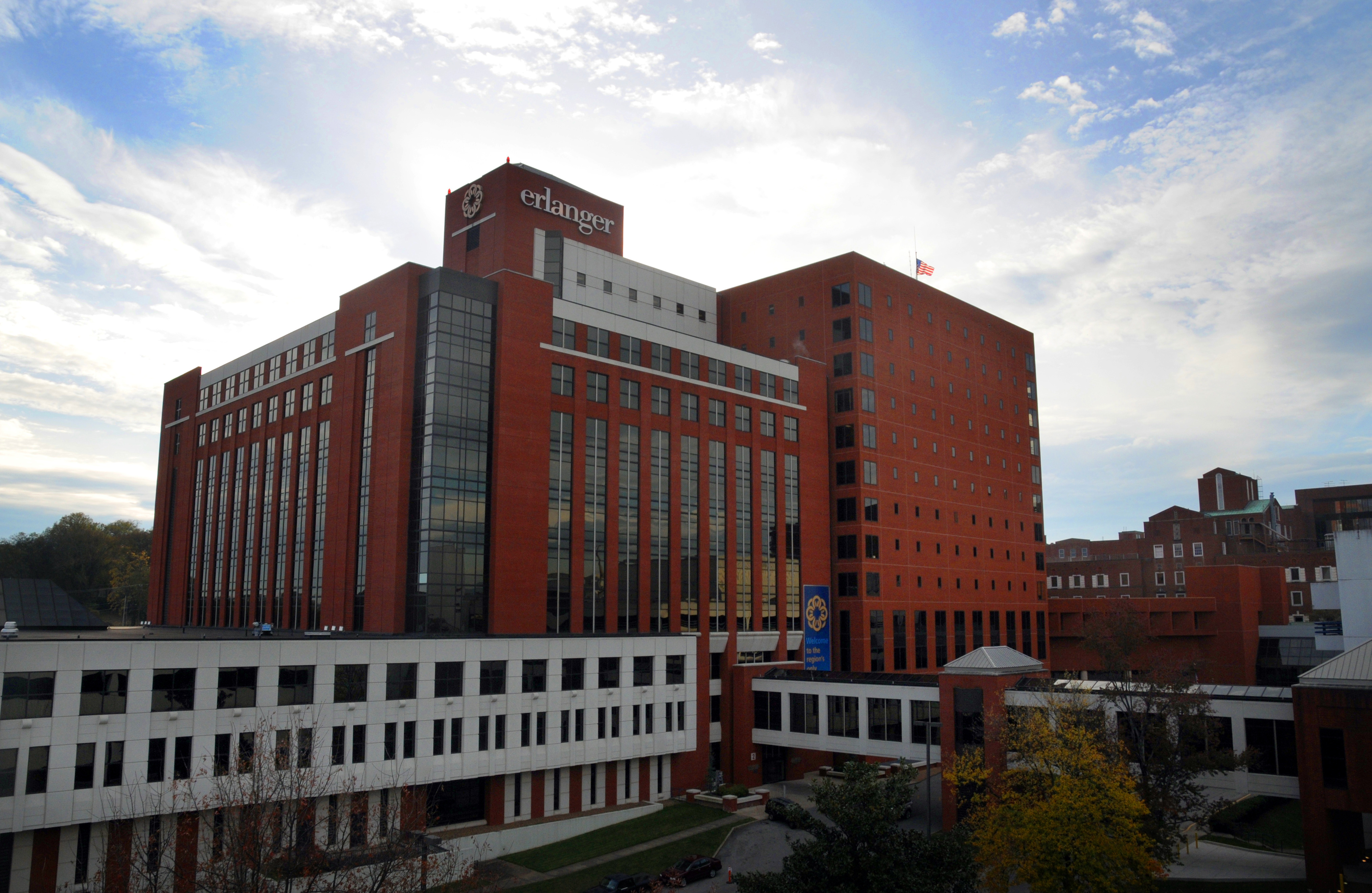
- Erlanger Baroness Hospital

Geography
- Location: Chattanooga, Tennessee, United States
- Coordinates: 35.0482°N 85.2897°W

Organization
- Care system: Independent, non-profit 501(c)(3)
- Type: Teaching
- Affiliated university: University of Tennessee Health Science Center College of Medicine

Services
- Emergency department: Level I trauma center
- Beds: 813

History
- Founded: 1889

Links
- Website: erlanger.org
- Lists: Hospitals in Tennessee

Erlanger (often referred to as Erlanger Hospital, Erlanger Health, or Erlanger Health System) is an independent, non-profit hospital system and safety net hospital based in Chattanooga, Tennessee. Erlanger's main location, Erlanger Baroness Hospital in downtown Chattanooga, is a tertiary referral hospital and Level I Trauma Center. It serves a 50,000 square mile (130,000 km^{2}) (125 mi (201 km) radius) region of East Tennessee, North Georgia, North Alabama, and western North Carolina.

== Academic Affiliation ==
Erlanger is the primary teaching hospital for the University of Tennessee Health Science Center's College of Medicine Chattanooga. UTHSC College of Medicine Chattanooga trains physicians enrolled annually in the medical college's residency and fellowship programs. Medical students from the University of Tennessee Health Science Center in Memphis may also elect clinical rotations at Erlanger. Nursing, paramedic, and allied health students train at Erlanger in conjunction with the University of Tennessee at Chattanooga (UTC), Chattanooga State Technical Community College (CSTCC), and other regional colleges.

== Level I Trauma Center ==
Erlanger is a Level I trauma center, meeting Tennessee Department of Health criteria to serve as a regional resource for adult and pediatric patients with major traumatic injuries. Erlanger is one of six Level I trauma centers in Tennessee.

== Hospitals, facilities, and practices ==
- Erlanger Baroness Hospital is Erlanger's main location just east of downtown Chattanooga.
- Children's Hospital at Erlanger is a Comprehensive Regional Pediatric Center (CRPC) next to Baroness Hospital. It offers pediatric subspecialties, a pediatric trauma unit, a children's emergency department, a separate outpatient center, and a Level IV neonatal intensive care unit⠀⠀
- Erlanger East Hospital is a community hospital serving East Chattanooga and Brainerd. It offers specialty care, emergency medicine, primary care, surgery, and women's services (OB/GYN).
- Erlanger North Hospital is a community hospital serving the Signal Mountain, Red Bank, and North Chattanooga communities. It offers 24/7 emergency care, sports and family medicine practices, an inpatient seniors program, and an accredited sleep disorders center.
- Erlanger Bledsoe Hospital is a community and safety net hospital in Pikeville, Tennessee. It serves residents of a rural three-county area along the Cumberland Plateau and Sequatchie Valley. Services include emergency care, family medicine, a cardiac rehabilitation program, and a 25-bed inpatient unit.
- Erlanger Western Carolina Hospital based in Murphy, North Carolina, is a 25-bed critical access hospital with an emergency department, wound care services, urgent care, and athletic/rehabilitation centers. The hospital provides inpatient and outpatient medical services for a seven-county region in western North Carolina, North Georgia, and East Tennessee.
- Erlanger Behavioral Health Hospital is an 88-bed mental health facility providing access to psychiatric and addiction services. This joint venture with Acadia Healthcare opened in June 2018.
- Erlanger Community Health Center is a safety-net clinical care provider operating under federal standards. It has four locations in the Chattanooga area providing families with primary and preventative medical, behavioral health, and dental care.
- Erlanger Sequatchie Valley in Dunlap, Tennessee, offers primary care and 24/7 emergency services, as well as weekly clinics for cardiology, orthopaedics, and women's health.
- Erlanger at Volkswagen Drive is a multi-use health and wellness center that includes a family practice, a fitness center, adult urgent care, and childcare facility.

== Life Force Air Medical ==
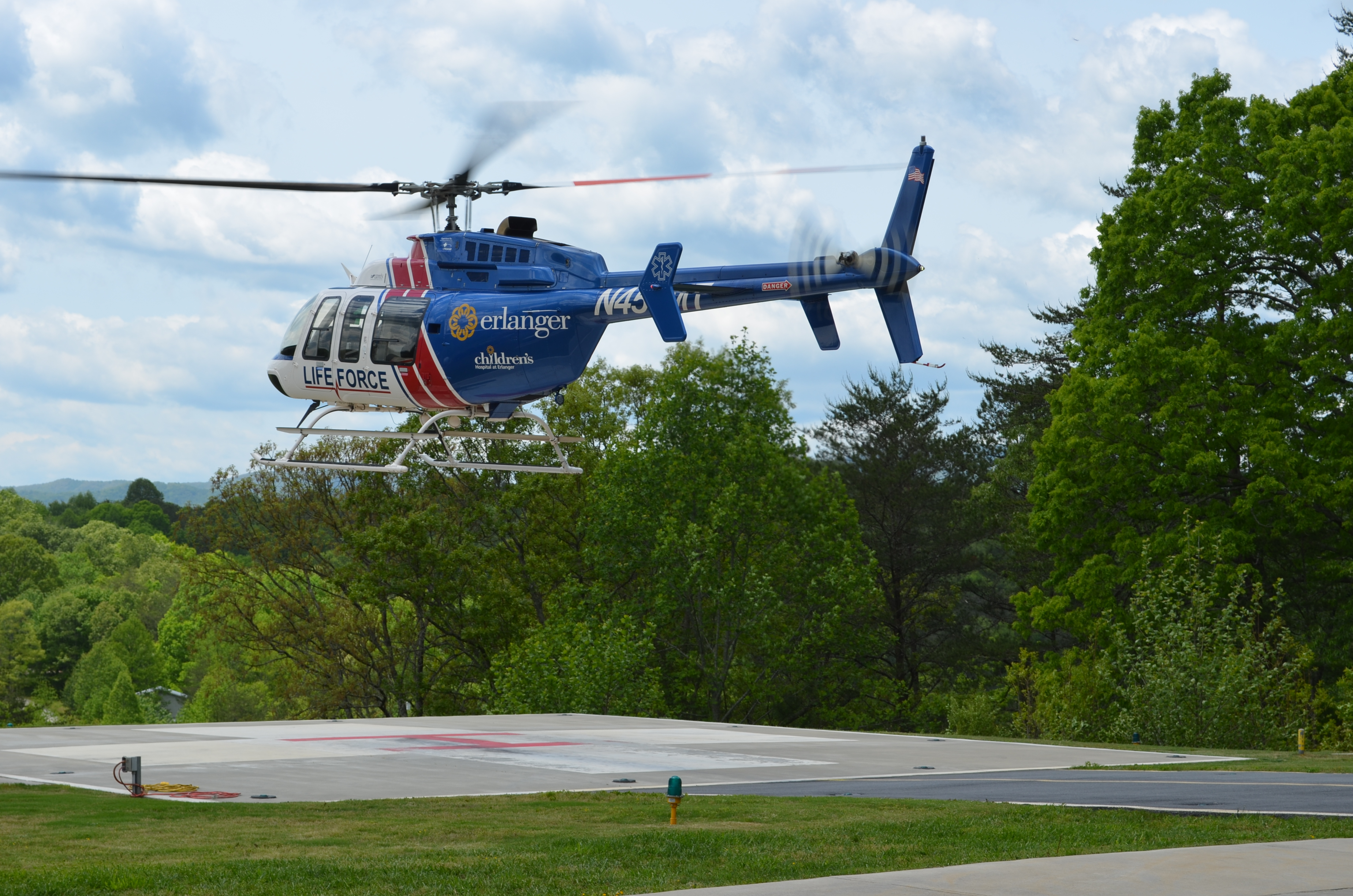
Bell 407 taking off from Life Force 4 base in McCaysville, GA

Erlanger LIFE FORCE helicopters provide air medical services covering 25,000 square miles in Tennessee, Georgia, Alabama, and North Carolina.

The aircraft are dispatched from six bases outside of Hamilton County: Calhoun and Blue Ridge in Georgia; Sparta, Winchester, and Cleveland in Tennessee; and Andrews in North Carolina. The helicopters then transport pediatric and adult patients to the most appropriate receiving hospital, usually Baroness Hospital.

Life Force began operations at Erlanger in December 1988. In 2008, MedTrans Corp., a Dallas-based air medical provider, began operating the aviation aspects of the program under a 10-year lease agreement.

On March 9, 2023, the Andrews-based Life Force 6 EC-135 helicopter crashed in Macon County, North Carolina. This was the first crash of any Life Force helicopter. All operations of Life Force were suspended, and operations were back up on March 14, with the exception of Life Force 6. Life Force 6 resumed operations on April 11, under a non-Life Force branded EC-135.

The LIFE FORCE fleet includes three Airbus H135 helicopters (formerly known as Eurocopter EC-135) and two Bell 407 helicopters.

== Medical Specialties ==
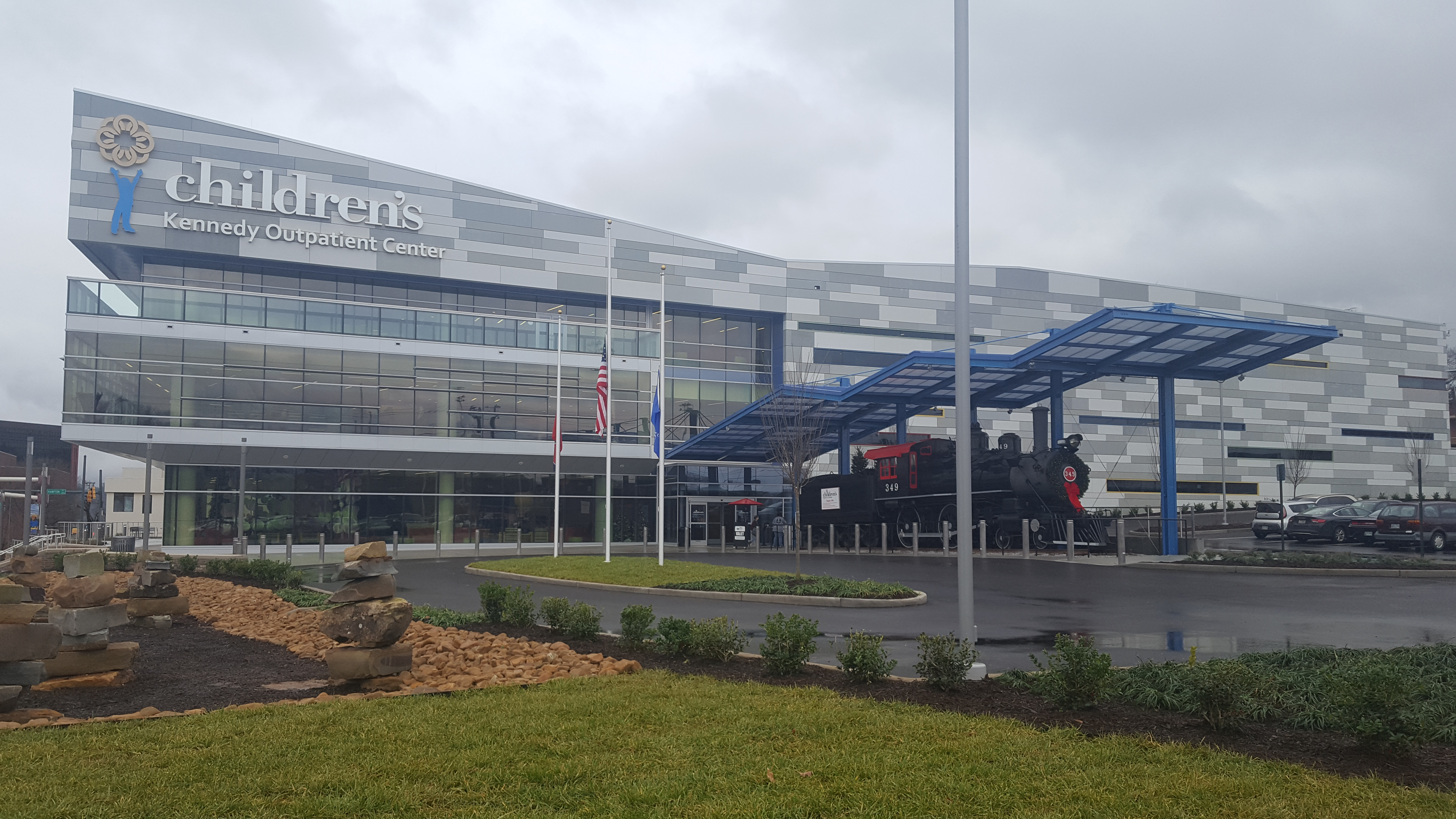
Children's Hospital at Erlanger opened the Kennedy Outpatient Center in December of 2018

Erlanger provides medical care, research, and educational training in neuroscience, neurosurgery, trauma, surgery, pediatrics (through Children's Hospital at Erlanger), orthopedics, urology, oncology, cardiology, emergency medicine, primary care, pulmonology/ critical care, rheumatology, endocrinology, women’s health (OB/GYN), palliative care, and bariatric surgery.

== History ==
1889 – Baron Frédéric Emile d'Erlanger, a German-French financier with railroad holdings in Chattanooga, donates $5,000 ($180,000 in 2025 dollars) to establish the region's first permanent hospital.

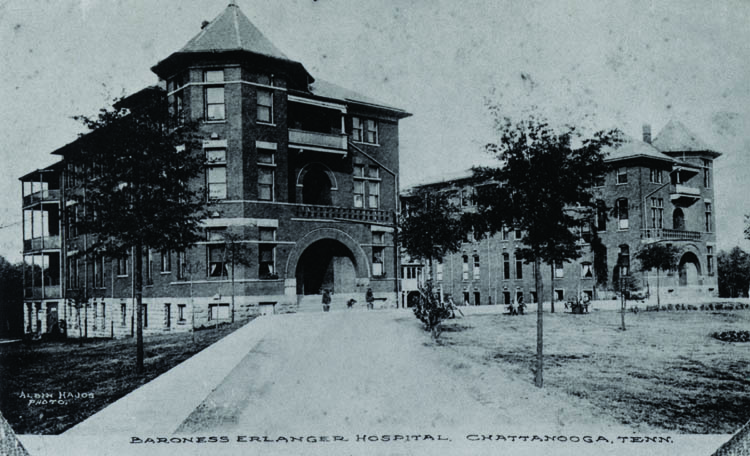
Photo of Erlanger Hospital taken in the late 19th century

1891 – Community leaders hold a cornerstone ceremony to celebrate the completion of the building's foundation on a four-acre tract on Harrison Avenue, now East 3rd Street. They name the facility in honor of the Baron's wife, Baroness Marguerite Mathilde Slidell d'Erlanger.

1892-1899 – Even though Erlanger's first building was nearly complete by 1891, the financial downturn of the early1890s blocked the hospital from opening. In response, Chattanooga and Hamilton County agreed to jointly purchase, equip, and open the hospital. At a cost of $50,000 ($1.9 million in 2025 dollars), Baroness Erlanger Hospital opened with 72 beds in 1899.

1900 - During its first nine months of operation, Erlanger treated 350 patients and performed at least one surgery each day.

1929 – T.C. Thompson Children’s Hospital is established in Chattanooga's Glenwood community. The pediatric facility is named in honor of T.C. Thompson, a former Chattanooga mayor who, along with the local Civitan Club, led efforts to create the facility.

1957 – The two oldest portions of Erlanger, the original west and central wings, are razed to make way for expanded in-patient and surgical facilities.

1960 – The region’s first “dry heart surgery” (using an external heart pump machine to keep the patient alive) was performed at Erlanger in March 1960. By the 1960s, Erlanger services centered on chronic conditions such as heart disease and cancer, representing a major shift from overriding concerns over contagious disease at the start of the century.

1965 – In July 1961, Erlanger opens its first Intensive Care Unit (ICU), one of only 600 in the nation's 7,000 hospitals.

1967 – Erlanger opens the area's first Coronary Care Unit and first chromosomal laboratory (cytogenetics) with genetic counseling service.

1975 – T.C. Thompson Children's Hospital becomes part of Erlanger and is relocated to the downtown location.

1976 – The children's hospital opens a pediatric intensive care unit. Also this year, area voters approved creating the Chattanooga-Hamilton County Hospital Authority as Erlanger's new governing body. This transition established a new board with the ability to acquire debt, so Erlanger would no longer be solely dependent on the City of Chattanooga and Hamilton County for funding. This move also transferred all Erlanger property from the city and county to the hospital authority.

1984 – Erlanger's cardiology team performs a repeat coronary artery bypass using the internal mammary arteries to bypass the blocks in the saphenous vein grafts. This technique did not require the use of a heart-lung machine.

1987 – Erlanger seeks designation as Level I Trauma Center from the Tennessee Board for Licensing Health Center Facilities.

1988 – LIFE FORCE air ambulance service begins operations and transports its first patient, a four-year-old from Sewanee, TN in a 17-minute flight to Erlanger.

1989 – Chattanooga's first kidney transplant was performed at Erlanger on Sept. 26, 1989, when a mother donated a kidney to her daughter. Dr. Daniel Fisher, head of the Erlanger transplant team, directed the procedure.

2007 – U.S. President George W. Bush tours Erlanger Baroness Hospital, where he is briefed on the latest advancements in stroke treatment and receives a hands-on demonstration of the da Vinci robotic surgical system. During a healthcare forum at the Chattanooga Convention Center, President Bush expresses admiration for Erlanger's commitment to cutting-edge care.

2016 – In Nov. of 2016, the Erlanger completed a $50 million expansion of Erlanger East Hospital. That month Erlanger also launched a new Heart and Lung Institute, expanding the health system's cardiovascular team, capabilities, and facilities.

2018 – On April 1, 2018, Erlanger assumed operation of Murphy Medical Center in Murphy, North Carolina, and soon renamed the facility Erlanger Western Carolina Hospital. December of that year, also marked the opening of a 90,000 ft^{2} (8,400 m^{2}) pediatric outpatient facility, the Kennedy Outpatient Center, located at Erlanger's downtown campus.

2023 - In July 2023, the Tennessee attorney general signed off on Erlanger’s transition to an independent, nonprofit organization. This was the final step in converting Chattanooga’s largest and only safety net hospital from a government to a private entity under Internal Revenue Code 501(c)(3). Erlanger's leadership said this transition would enable the hospital to make more rapid decisions in line with other health organizations, better provide changing outpatient or one-night services at satellite facilities, and attract additional philanthropic gifts to aid projects.

2025 - In May of 2025, Erlanger and the Chattanooga Lookouts announced that the city’s new multi-use sports and entertainment venue in the South Broad District will be named Erlanger Park. Officials noted the naming rights partnership expands on a long-standing relationship between two organizations with deep roots in the community, “creating a dynamic space that brings people together and supports the continued growth of our region.”

2026 - On July 22, 2026, Erlanger Health System signed a letter of intent to join Prisma Health.

== Accolades ==
Erlanger regularly receives awards in the Chattanooga Times Free Press readers' choice Best of the Best polls. In 2025, Erlanger was voted Best Hospital, Best Urgent Care, and Best Emergency Room in the region. The system's Dr. Brent Campbell was voted Best General Practice Doctor. Since 2007, Erlanger has been named the Best Place to Have a Baby every year.
