= Erlanger Park =

New baseball park in Chattanooga, Tennessee

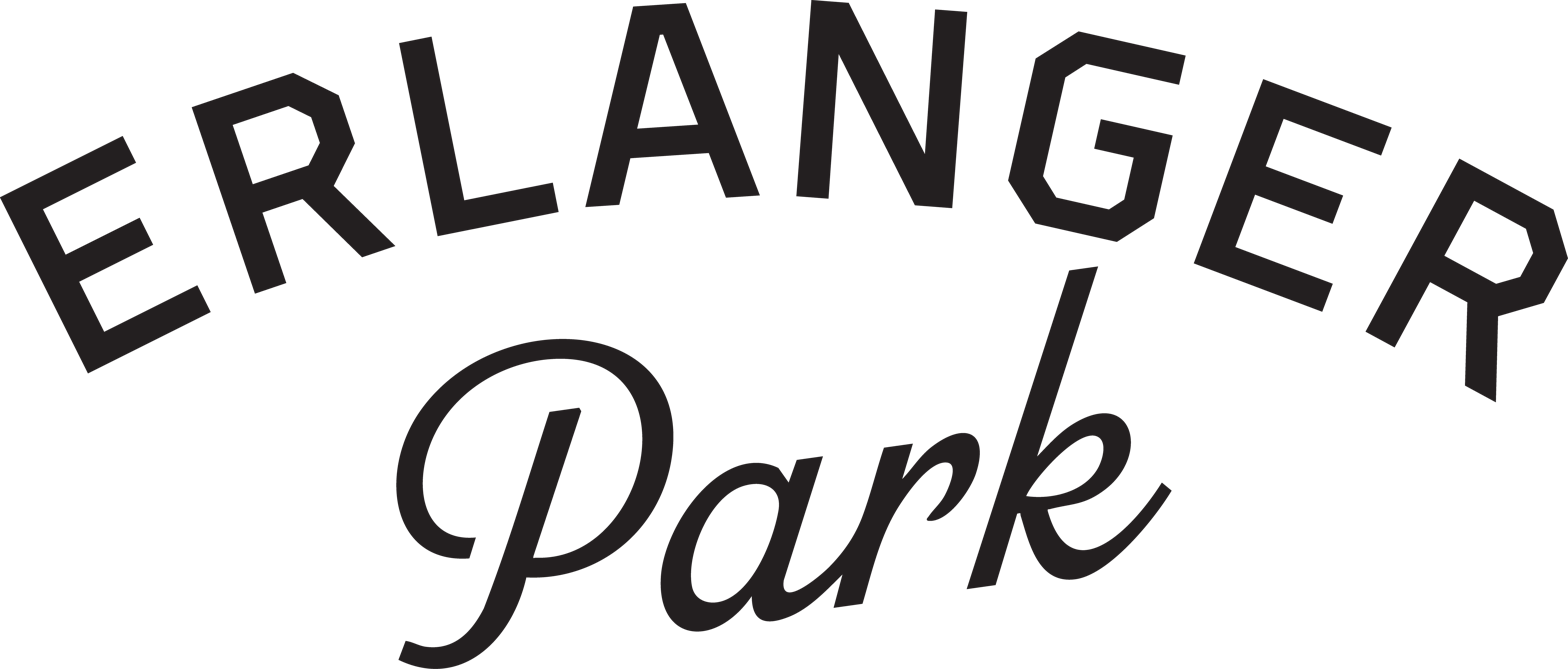

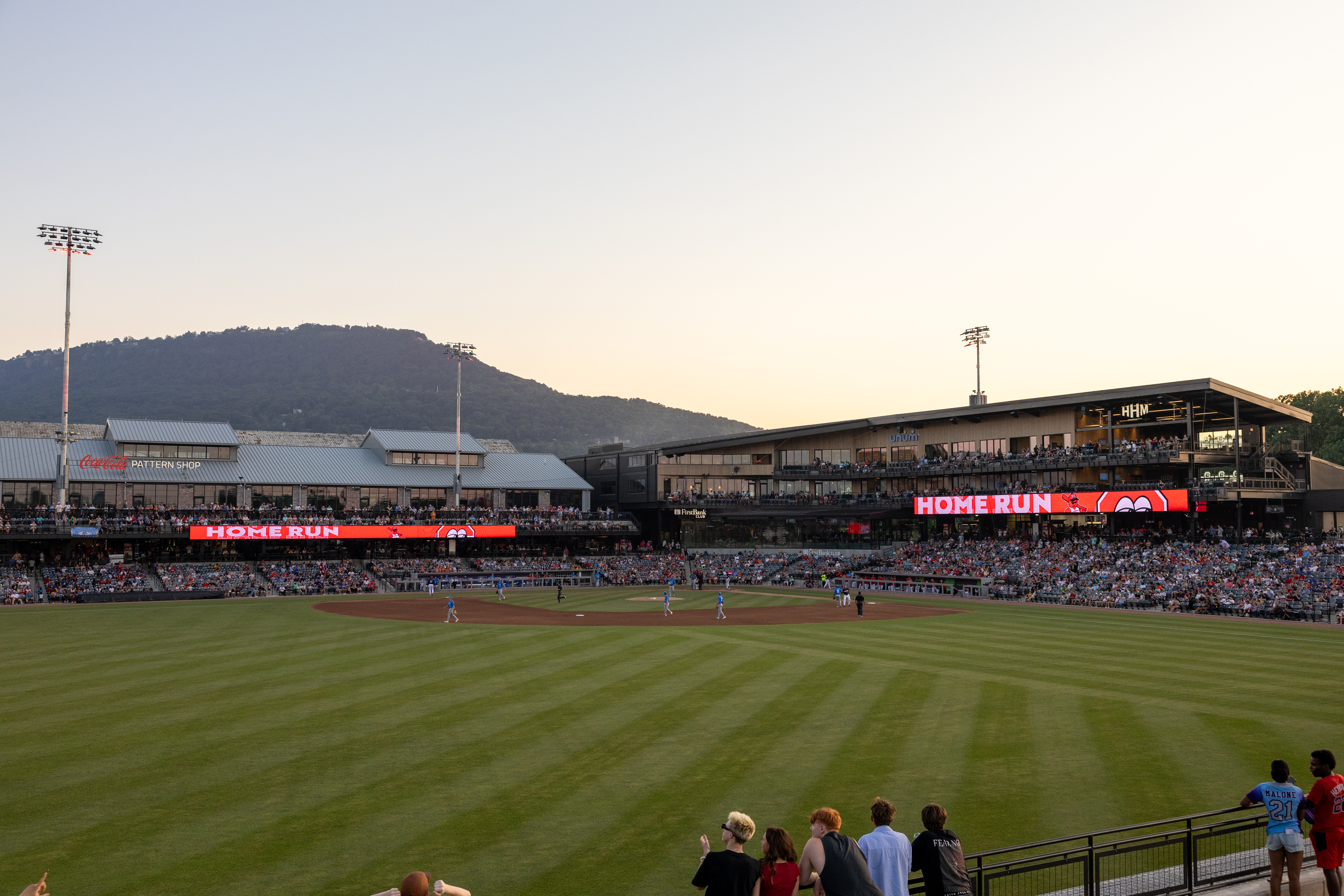
- Erlanger Park in 2026
- Interactive map of Erlanger Park
- Address: Chattanooga, Tennessee; United States
- Coordinates: 35.02602°N 85.32085°W
- Owner: Chattanooga Sports Authority
- Operator: Chattanooga Sports Authority
- Capacity: 8,032
- Executive suites: 16
- Surface: Grass
- Record attendance: 8,341 (April 18, 2026, Montgomery Biscuits vs. Chattanooga Lookouts)
- Field size: Left field: 325 ft (99 m); Center field: 400 ft (120 m); Right field: 325 ft (99 m)

Construction
- Groundbreaking: July 2024
- Opened: April 14, 2026
- Cost: $115 million
- General contractor: EMJ Construction

Tenant
- Chattanooga Lookouts (SL) 2026–present

Website
- https://erlangerpark.com

Erlanger Park is a baseball park in Chattanooga, Tennessee. It is the home of the Double-A Chattanooga Lookouts of the Southern League. It opened on April 14, 2026, and can seat 8,032 people.

The stadium was built on the site of the old United States Pipe and Foundry Company in the South Broad District of Chattanooga, with the former Power House building serving as the entrance to the stadium.

== History ==
In January 2024, the Lookouts reached an agreement for the construction of a new stadium in the South Broad District of Chattanooga. Groundbreaking for the project took place on July 15, 2024, marking the start of construction. On May 22, 2025, Erlanger Health System was announced as the naming rights sponsor for the new stadium.

The attendance record at Erlanger Park is currently set at 8,341 during the opening weekend when the Montgomery Biscuits played the Chattanooga Lookouts.
