= St. Jude Children's Research Hospital =

Hospital headquartered in Memphis, Tennessee, US

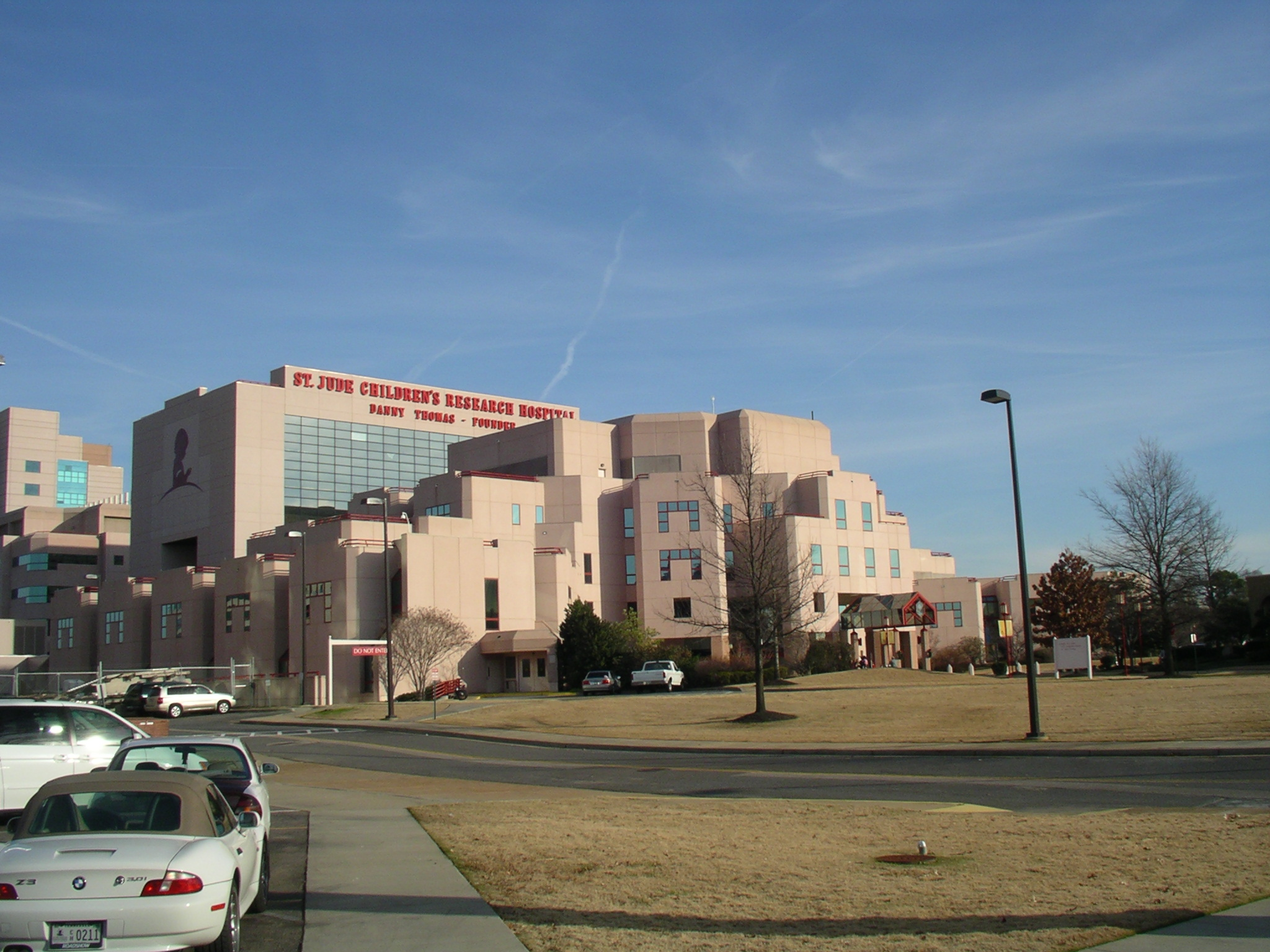
- Headquarters at Danny Thomas Place, Memphis, Tennessee

Geography
- Location: Memphis, Tennessee, United States
- Coordinates: 35.153469°N 90.042207°W

Organization
- Care system: Private and Charity
- Type: Specialized
- Religious affiliation: None

Services
- Standards: TJC accreditation
- Emergency department: No

History
- Founded: February 4, 1962; 64 years ago

Links
- Website: stjude.org
- Lists: Hospitals in Tennessee

St. Jude Children's Research Hospital is a pediatric treatment and research hospital headquartered in Memphis, Tennessee, United States. Founded by entertainer Danny Thomas in 1962, it is a 501(c)(3) designated nonprofit medical corporation that focuses on children's catastrophic diseases, particularly leukemia and other cancers. In the 2021 fiscal year, St. Jude received $2 billion in donations. Daily operating costs average $1.7 million, but patients are not charged for care. St. Jude's covers some, but not all cancer-related costs. St. Jude treats patients up to age 21, and for some conditions, up to age 25.

== History ==
St. Jude Children's Research Hospital was founded by entertainer Danny Thomas on February 4, 1962, before a crowd of 9,000 people, with help from Lemuel Diggs and Thomas' close friend from Miami, automobile dealer Anthony Abraham. The hospital was founded on the premise that "no child should die in the dawn of life". This idea came from a vow which Thomas, a Maronite Catholic, had made many years before to the hospital's namesake, Saint Jude Thaddeus the Apostle.

Thomas was a comedian struggling to get a break in his career and living paycheck to paycheck. When his first child was about to be born, he attended Mass in Detroit, and emptied his wallet – comprising $7 ($156.77 in 2025) – into the offering box. He prayed to Saint Jude Thaddeus for a means to provide for his family, and vowed that if the saint interceded for his success, he would build him a shrine. About a week later, Thomas obtained a gig that paid ten times what he had put in the offering box, and he eventually became a successful comedian starring on Make Room for Daddy, later known as The Danny Thomas Show. Thomas then built St. Jude Children's Research Hospital in fulfilment of his promise to Saint Jude Thaddeus. Memphis was chosen at the suggestion of Catholic Cardinal Samuel Stritch, a Tennessee native who had confirmed Thomas and become his spiritual adviser in the latter's boyhood home of Toledo, Ohio.

Upon opening, the Memphis-based St. Jude Children’s Research Hospital immediately underwent racial integration, with African-American and white patients receiving treatment in the same rooms, dining together, and sharing bathroom facilities. The hospital would be the first fully integrated children's hospital based in the South.

While some donations for St. Jude come from government grants and insurance recoveries, the principal source of funding comes from the American Lebanese Syrian Associated Charities (ALSAC), a semi-independent entity founded in 1957 by Thomas himself. ALSAC serves primarily to raise funds and promote awareness for St. Jude. They largely collect funds from independent sources, such as companies and individuals.

Danny's daughter Marlo Thomas grew up supporting the mission of St. Jude Children's Research Hospital, and she became its national outreach director in 1991.

In 2007, Chili's restaurant chain pledged $50 million to fund the construction of the seven-story Chili's Care Center, adding 340,000 square feet (32,000 m^{2}), providing space for the department of radiological services, The Pediatric Brain Tumor Consortium, two floors of outpatient clinics, one floor of inpatient clinics and rooms, two floors of laboratory space, an office floor and an unfinished level for future expansion.

In 2010, the Pediatric Cancer Genome Project was launched in collaboration with Washington University in an effort to identify somatic mutations that drive cancer, in hopes of identifying new targets against which novel therapeutics can be developed.

In 2014, the Marlo Thomas Center for Global Education and Collaboration was opened as part of the hospital. In 2017, the St. Jude Graduate School of Biomedical Sciences accepted its inaugural class of PhD students.

In 2021, the SpaceX Inspiration4 mission, the first private spaceflight, raised over $243 million for St. Jude.

In 2025 YouTuber Ryan Trahan and his wife, Haley Pham, raised over $11 million for St. Jude.

== Hospital functions and effects ==
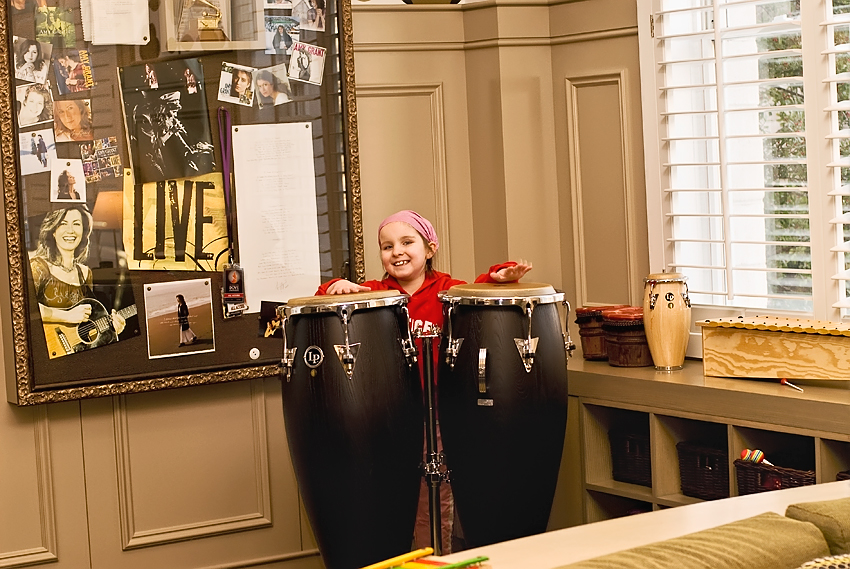
A child playing congas in the Amy Grant Music Room at Target House, one of St. Jude Children's Research Hospital's housing facilities

St. Jude has an International Outreach Program to improve the survival rates of children with catastrophic illnesses worldwide.

St. Jude treats patients up to age 21 and for some conditions, up to age 25.

== Corporate structure ==
Donald Pinkel was the first director of St. Jude and served from 1962 until 1973. His successor, Alvin Mauer, was director from 1973 to 1983. Joseph Simone was the hospital's third director from 1983 to 1992. Arthur W. Nienhuis was CEO and director of St. Jude from 1993 until 2004. William E. Evans, the hospital's fifth director, served from 2004 to 2014. He was succeeded by CEO and director James R. Downing on July 15, 2014.

As of 2018, St. Jude's scientific director was James I. Morgan, Ph.D.

Despite it being named for Danny Thomas's patron saint, St. Jude is a secular institution that is not affiliated with any religious organization.

== Affiliated institutions ==
St. Jude is affiliated with several institutions in the United States, through a network of hematology clinics, hospitals, and universities that are united under the mission of St. Jude. As of July 2023, the Domestic Affiliate Clinic sites include:

- Our Lady of the Lake Regional Medical Center, in Baton Rouge, Louisiana
- Novant Health Hemby Children's Hospital, in Charlotte, North Carolina
- Huntsville Hospital for Women & Children, in Huntsville, Alabama
- Johnson City Medical Center, in Johnson City, Tennessee
- St. Jude Midwest Affiliate, Children's Hospital of Illinois in Peoria, Illinois
- Louisiana State University, Department of Pediatrics, in Shreveport, Louisiana
- Mercy Children's Hospital, in Springfield, Missouri
- The Children's Hospital at Saint Francis, in Tulsa, Oklahoma

St. Jude also works with Le Bonheur Children's Medical Center, also located in downtown Memphis. St. Jude patients needing certain procedures, such as brain surgery, may undergo procedures at Le Bonheur Hospital. Both St. Jude and Le Bonheur are teaching hospitals affiliated with the University of Tennessee Health Science Center. University of Tennessee physicians training in pediatrics, surgery, radiology, and other specialties undergo service rotations at St. Jude.

The Children's Cancer Center of Lebanon was established in Beirut on April 12, 2002. The center is an affiliate of St. Jude Children's Research Hospital and works in association with the American University of Beirut Medical Center (AUBMC).

A commitment has been made to establish a US$412 million research facility in Memphis, Tennessee, one purpose of which will be to serve as a collaborative hub.

== Funding ==
St. Jude Children's Research Hospital and American Lebanese Syrian Associated Charities (ALSAC) are both nonprofits. From 2000 to 2005, 83.7% of the funds received by St. Jude went to operation or investments. From 2002 to 2004, 47% of program expenses went to patient care and 41% to research. In 2019, ALSAC raised $1.9 billion from donations, of which $975 million (51%) went to St. Jude. The rest of the funds were either spent on functional expenses for ALSAC or added to their fund balance, which totaled $5.7 billion at the end of 2019. In 2020, ALSAC raised $2.4 billion, of which $2 billion was from donations and contributions (84%). $997 million (42%) of this went to St. Jude. At the end of 2020, St. Jude's fund balance was $8.03 billion. 74% of St. Jude's total budget comes from donations, and the hospital costs about $1.7 million per day to run.

=== Criticism of fundraising approach ===
A 2021 report by ProPublica criticized St. Jude's accumulation of donor funds, noting that the hospital held reserves of approximately $5.2 billion, equivalent to more than four years of expenses. The reports also alleged that the hospital pursued donations through litigation and raised more donations than the nine higher-ranked hospitals combined. The hospital's website states that 82% of all dollars received go to support patient care, research, and future needs. ProPublica reported that about 50% of the funds raised went to patient care or research, with 30% of the remaining funds raised being spent on fundraising and 20% going to their reserves.

=== Philanthropic aid ===
In January 1964, the former presidential yacht USS Potomac was purchased by Elvis Presley for US$55,000. Presley then gave the Potomac to St. Jude Children's Research Hospital, in Memphis, to sell as a fundraiser.

=== Other funding initiatives ===
Eagles for St. Jude was a program created in 2007 by Stanford Financial Group, which paid to become title sponsor of the St. Jude Classic, the annual PGA Tour event in Memphis. The program and sponsorship ended in February 2009, when it was found that Stanford Financial Group was a Ponzi scheme, having defrauded investors out of $8 billion, with a small fraction of that stolen money having been channeled into the Eagles for St. Jude program.

=== McDonald's Monopoly Game ===
In 1995, St. Jude received an anonymous letter postmarked in Dallas, Texas, containing a $1 million winning McDonald's Monopoly game piece. McDonald's officials came to the hospital, accompanied by a representative from the accounting firm Arthur Andersen, and verified it as a winner. Although game rules prohibited the transfer of prizes, and even after learning that the piece was sent by an individual involved in an embezzlement scheme intended to defraud McDonald's, McDonald's waived the rule and made the annual $50,000 annuity payments.

== Awards and achievements ==
In 2025, St. Jude Children's Research Hospital was named the "Most Trusted Nonprofit" in America for the fourth consecutive year by Morning Consult, ranking highest across all demographic segments. St. Jude was also included in The Chronicle of Philanthropy's "America's Favorite Charities" list in 2025. St. Jude has been ranked among the top 10 pediatric cancer hospitals by U.S. News & World Report for 18 consecutive years, and is currently ranked No. 7 nationally in Pediatric Cancer. In 2026, Forbes ranked St. Jude No. 2 on both its "America's Best Large Employers" and "America's Dream Employers" lists, and YouGov named St. Jude No. 6 among the top brands in the United States, the only nonprofit in the top 10.
