= University of Tennessee College of Dentistry =

Dental school of the University of Tennessee

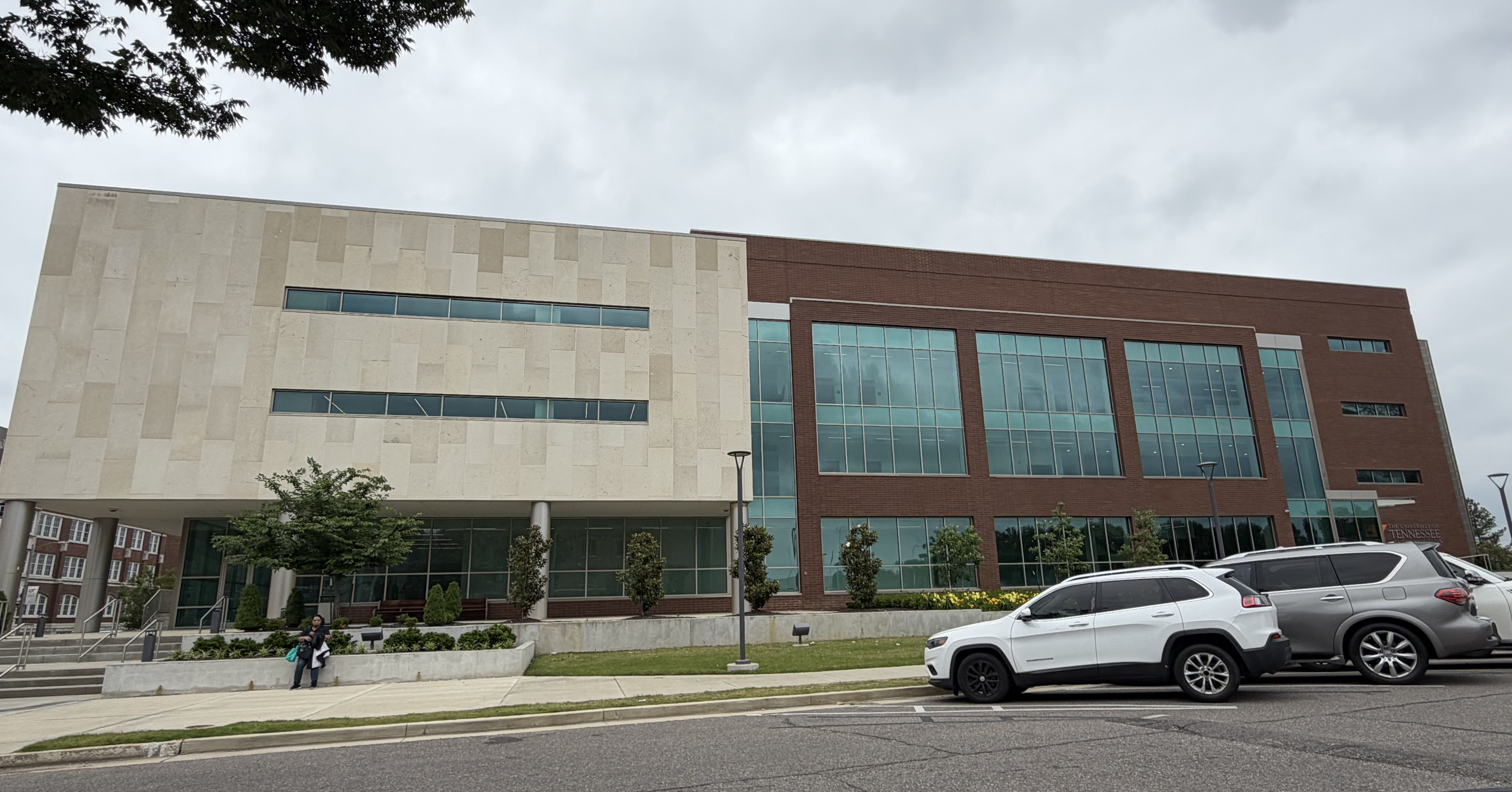
- The College of Dentistry is located in the Dunn Dental Building
- Type: Public university
- Established: 1878
- Location: Memphis, TN, U.S. 35.1381°N 90.0325°W
- Website: www.uthsc.edu/dentistry

The University of Tennessee College of Dentistry is the dental school of the University of Tennessee. It is in Memphis, Tennessee, United States, and its facilities are part of the University of Tennessee Health Science Center. The college has a four-year program and approximately 520 students.

== History ==
The college was founded in Nashville, TN in 1878, making the college the oldest dental college in the Southern United States and the third oldest public dental college in the country. The college was moved to Memphis, TN in 1911 and was located in Rogers Hall on Monroe Avenue until 1978, when it was moved to the newly constructed Dunn Building, named after Governor Winfield C. Dunn, a 1955 graduate of the school.

In 2002, the DentSim laboratory was added to the preclinical academic curriculum in an effort to include advanced computer technology to enhance learning. The DentSim is a group of 40 workstations, each containing high-speed handpieces, suction tips, a patient manikin, and a computer. With the use of several sensors, computers monitor the actions of students and return feedback.

== Today ==
The UT dental college is fully accredited by the Southern Association of Colleges and Schools.

Curriculum for the college includes courses on the basic sciences, including biochemistry, microbiology, pathology, histology, and anatomy. Dental courses include advanced pain control, oral pathology, and advanced oral radiology. Several optional courses are also offered.

On October 12, 2005, a Shelby County grand jury indicted 68 people alleged to be part of an embezzlement scheme which targeted the UT dental college. Agents for the Tennessee Bureau of Investigation found that about $130,000 was embezzled by three former employees of the college via reimbursement checks, which is reserved for patients at the college. The crime occurred between August 15, 2002 and November 3, 2003. To date, two of the former employees, Connie Ackerson and Alberta Paylor, have been arrested.

== Graduate programs ==
The UT dental college offers several graduate programs in specialty fields of dentistry. These programs include oral and maxillofacial surgery, periodontology, pediatric dentistry, prosthodontics and orthodontics. The college also offers a program in Advanced Education in General Dentistry (AEGD).

== See also ==
- American Student Dental Association
