= Methodist University Hospital =

- Methodist Le Bonheur Healthcare

Geography
- Location: 1265 Union Ave, Memphis, Tennessee, United States
- Coordinates: 35.13571°N 90.01949°W

Organization
- Type: Teaching
- Affiliated university: University of Tennessee Health Science Center

Services
- Beds: 617

History
- Founded: June 23, 1918

Links
- Website: Methodist University Hospital
- Lists: Hospitals in Tennessee

Methodist University Hospital is a hospital located in Memphis, Tennessee which is a part of Methodist Le Bonheur Healthcare. It is affiliated with University of Tennessee Health Science Center as a teaching hospital. The hospital focuses on oncology, cardiology, head and neck surgery, neurology and transplants. It is the largest and most comprehensive hospital in the Methodist Healthcare system.

== History ==
On June 23, 1918, John H. Sherard Sr, a wealthy cotton planter from Mississippi, founded Methodist University Hospital, then called Methodist Hospital, after receiving the Lucy Brinkley Hospital, a women's hospital located at 855 Union Avenue, as a gift. The hospital later became Methodist Le Bonheur Healthcare, a healthcare system which operates a network of hospitals. The hospital originally did not have an ambulance system and relied on "funeral homes' ambulance services to get patients to emergency care".

Methodist Le Bonheur Healthcare was ranked 91 of the top 100 best companies to work for in 2018.

=== Reform of collection practices ===
The Methodist LeBonheur Healthcare System, like the two other major systems in the region, was criticized for its pursuit of payment from poor patients. For example, in July 2007, Carrie Barrett went to the emergency room at Methodist University Hospital complaining about shortness of breath, swelling of her legs and black discoloration of her toes. She was billed $12,019 for her two night stay, and after a lawsuit was filed against her she ended owing approximately $33,000. Between 2014 and 2018 Methodist Healthcare filed over 8,300 lawsuits for unpaid bills. This collection practice was ended soon after it received negative publicity, and it was reversed, erasing millions in patient debt.

== See also ==
- List of hospitals in Tennessee
