= Le Bonheur Children's Hospital =

- Methodist Healthcare System

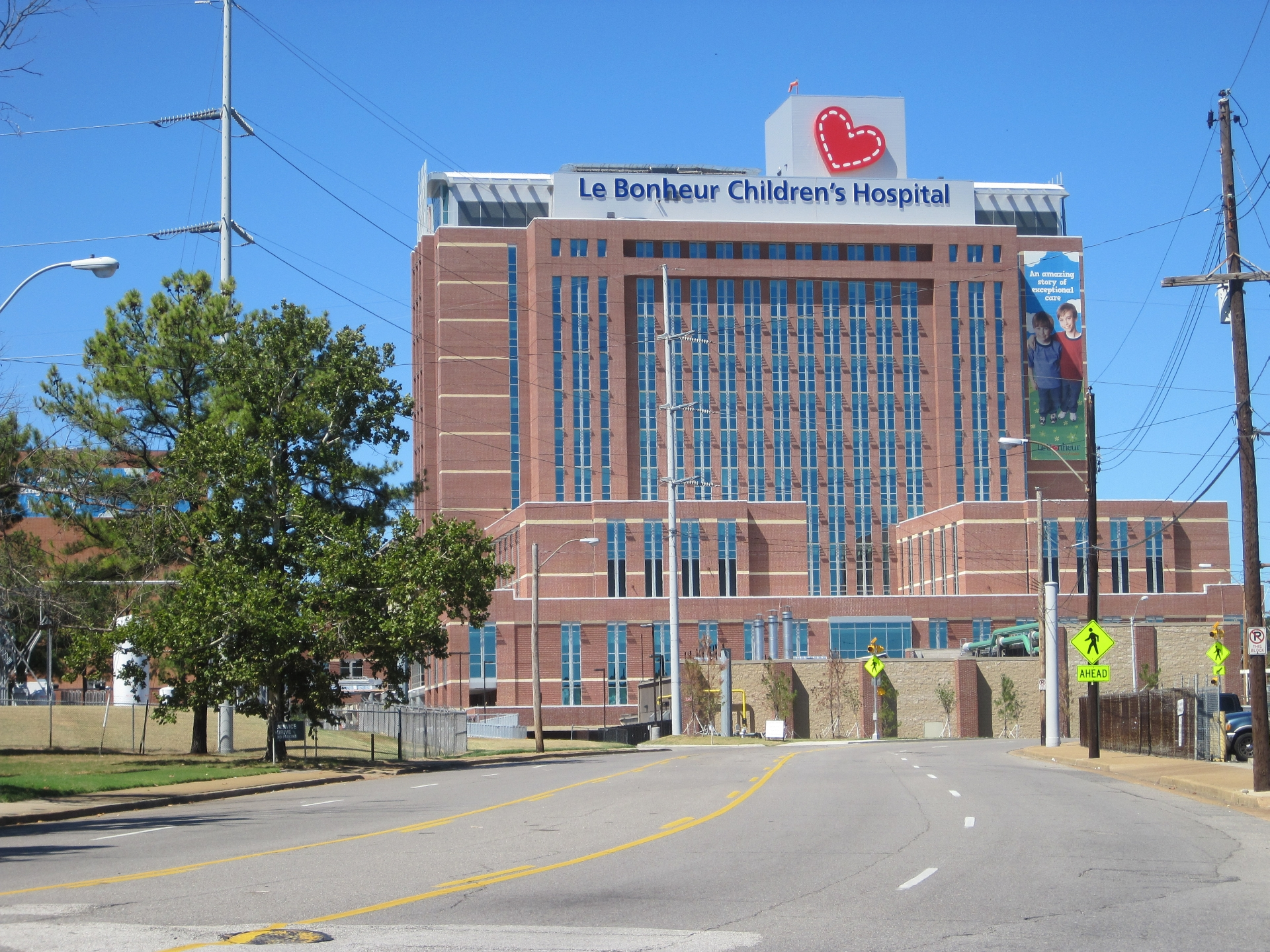
- Le Bonheur Children's Medical Center in Memphis, Tennessee

Geography
- Location: 848 Adams Avenue, Memphis, Tennessee, United States
- Coordinates: 35.1440°N 90.0325°W

Organization
- Care system: Private
- Type: Children's Hospital
- Affiliated university: University of Tennessee Health Science Center

Services
- Emergency department: Level 1 Regional Pediatric Trauma Center
- Beds: 255
- Helipad: FAA LID: 8TN0

History
- Opened: 1952

Links
- Website: www.lebonheur.org
- Lists: Hospitals in Tennessee

Le Bonheur Children's Hospital is a 255-bed, tertiary care children's hospital located in Downtown Memphis, Tennessee. Le Bonheur has more than 700 medical staff representing 40 pediatric specialties. Approximately 170 patients per day are admitted, mostly from Tennessee and nearby states but also from around the world, mainly due to its nationally recognized brain tumor program, affiliation with St. Jude Children's Research Hospital and for being the home of the Children's Foundation Research Center. The hospital treats infants, children, teens, and young adults aged 0–21.

Le Bonheur functions as the region's primary level 1 pediatric trauma center. The hospital cares for 14,000 patients every year, including about 81,000 visits to the emergency department a year and 8,800 surgeries per year. Le Bonheur also serves as a teaching hospital affiliated with the University of Tennessee Health Science Center and offers training in general pediatrics and pediatric subspecialties.

== History ==
Le Bonheur was founded on June 15, 1952, by the Le Bonheur Club, originally a women's sewing circle, and was originally an orphanage dedicated to caring for poor children. The Le Bonheur Club members raised all of the money for the initial investment for the hospital. When the doors opened, the Le Bonheur Club President, Mrs. Howard Pritchard, stated: "The doors of Le Bonheur will never be found closed and will forever hereafter be open to those who come in need, seeking its help." The medical center has gone through two major expansion projects.

When Hurricane Katrina first hit New Orleans in August 2005, Le Bonheur (along with other hospitals) sent helicopters to Tulane Medical Center, Ochsner, and CHNOLA in order to help evacuate pediatric patients from the hospital.

In February 2008, ground was broken on the new expansion by Le Bonheur executives. In December 2010, Le Bonheur Children's Hospital opened the emergency department in its newly renovated 12-story patient care tower. Le Bonheur maintains two ambulances equipped for critical care transport.

== Methodist Le Bonheur Healthcare ==
In 1995, Le Bonheur became a part of the Methodist Healthcare System, supported by the Memphis, Mississippi and Arkansas conferences of The United Methodist Church. The system includes Methodist University Hospital in Memphis and Methodist Olive Branch hospital in Mississippi.

The impetus that led to creation of the Methodist LeBonheur Healthcare System occurred in 1918 when a Mississippi farmer named John Sherard visited a sick pastor.

== Education ==
Le Bonheur is affiliated with the University of Tennessee Health Science Center and St. Jude Children's Research Hospital. It offers training in general pediatrics and several subspecialty areas of pediatrics. Le Bonheur Children's Hospital has been ranked among the nation's best by U.S. News & World Report in different specialties.
