= Eagles for St. Jude =

Eagles for St Jude was a program created in 2007 by the Stanford Financial Group when it paid to become the title sponsor of the St. Jude Classic, the annual PGA golf tournament held in Memphis. The program ended when Stanford Financial Group was seized in February 2009, with the U.S. Securities and Exchange Commission finding that Stanford was operating a "massive Ponzi scheme", defrauding clients and investors of millions of dollars.

During the short period that Stanford sponsored the St. Jude Championship, the Eagles for St. Jude program donated $1,500 for every eagle recorded on the PGA tour.

== Fundraising program ==
For each eagle carded on the PGA and LPGA TOUR during the 2008 season, Stanford Financial Group donated $1,000 to the Eagles for St. Jude campaign. Additionally, Vijay Singh, who served as the Eagles for St. Jude Ambassador, personally donated $5,000 for every eagle he made during the 2008 season and Camilo Villegas donated $3,000 for each of his eagles.

== 2007 PGA Tour eagle leaders ==
During the 2007 PGA TOUR, 1,222 eagles were made, which resulted in Stanford Financial Group donating $1,222,000 of its stolen money to the Eagles for St. Jude program. Eagles for St. Jude Ambassador Vijay Singh, in no way a part of Stanford Financial Group's criminal actions, made 12 eagles and was slated to donate $1,000 of his own money per eagle, but instead donated $50,000 of his own money, a $38,000 donation above his commitment.
