= Baptist Health Sciences University =

Private college in Memphis, Tennessee, US

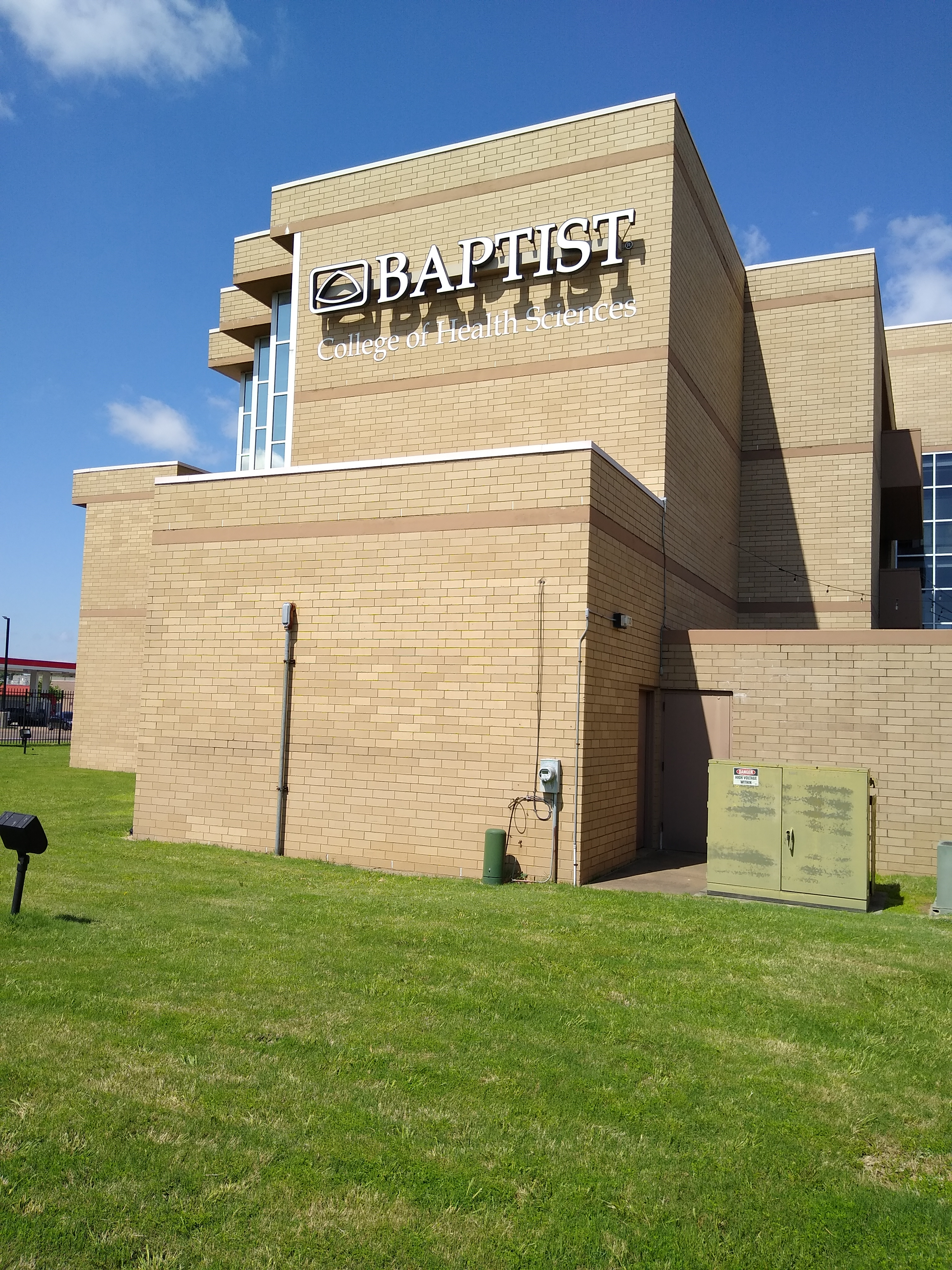
- Campus Hub Building
- Other name: Baptist Health Sciences University
- Former name: Baptist College of Health Sciences
- Type: Private college
- Established: 1912
- Parent institution: Baptist Memorial Health Care
- Endowment: $85.4 million
- President: Hampton Hopkins
- Academic staff: 69 Full-time (Fall 2023)
- Students: 755 (Fall 2023)
- Undergraduates: 733 (Fall 2023)
- Postgraduates: 22 (Fall 2023)
- Location: Memphis, Tennessee; 35.139362°N 90.028303°W
- Campus: Urban, 21 acres
- Nickname: Blue Healers
- Website: www.baptistu.edu

Baptist Health Sciences University, formerly Baptist College of Health Sciences, is a private college in Memphis, Tennessee. It is operated by Baptist Memorial Health Care. The school was created through the expansion of the School of Nursing (est. 1912) and School of Radiologic Technology (est. 1956) from diploma programs into a college in 1994. It offers Bachelor's degrees in healthcare. They recently expand their programs to include a college of osteopathic medicine with classes expected to begin in fall 2024.
