= Peter F. Buckley =

American psychiatrist

- Education: University College Dublin
- Awards: Strecker Award
- Scientific career
- Fields: Psychiatry
- Workplaces: Virginia Commonwealth University, Medical College of Georgia (Augusta University); University of Tennessee Health Science Center
- Thesis: Cerebral morphology and metabolism in schizophrenia: relationship to clinical indices (1997)

Peter F. Buckley is an American psychiatrist and university administrator who focuses on the neurobiology and treatment of schizophrenia. He received his medical degree from the University College Dublin School of Medicine in Ireland and joined the Medical College of Georgia in 2000 as chair of the Department of Psychiatry and health behavior. During the period of 2010–2017 he served as dean of the college. Then he moved to Virginia Commonwealth University and was appointed dean of the school of medicine in 2017, a role in which he served until 2021. A Scientific Council member of the Brain & Behaviour Research Foundation, Buckley is senior author of a postgraduate textbook of psychiatry and editor-in-chief of Clinical Schizophrenia & Related Psychoses. He has published more than 500 scientific articles. He has served as chancellor of the University of Tennessee Health Science Center in Memphis, Tennessee since February 1, 2022.

== Awards and honours ==
- 2012: Cancro Academic Leadership Award in psychiatry from the American Academy of Child and Adolescent Psychiatry.
- 2015: listed in the Irish America magazine's 2015 list of the best and brightest Irish-American and Irish-born trailblazers in the life sciences.

== Selected publications ==
- Peter F. Buckley; Brian J. Miller (September 2015). "Schizophrenia Research: A Progress Report". Psychiatr Clin North Am. 38 (3): 373–7. doi:10.1016/j.psc.2015.05.001. PMID 26300028.
- Peter F Buckley (September 2005). "Neuroimaging of schizophrenia: structural abnormalities and pathophysiological implications". Neuropsychiatr Dis Treat. 1 (3): 193–204. PMC 2416751. PMID 18568069.
- Peter F Buckley (October 2020). "Treatment-Resistant Schizophrenia". Focus (Am Psychiatr Publ). 18 (4): 364–367. doi:10.1176/appi.focus.20200025. PMC 7725152. PMID 33343247.
