= Pediatric Anesthesia =

- Discipline: Anesthetics
- Language: English
- Edited by: Andrew Davidson

Publication details
- History: 1991–present
- Publisher: John Wiley & Sons
- Frequency: Monthly
- Impact factor: 2.556 (2020)

Standard abbreviations
- ISO 4: Pediatr. Anesth.

Indexing
- ISSN: 1460-9592

Links
- Journal homepage

Pediatric Anesthesia is a peer-reviewed scientific journal published by John Wiley and Sons covering research on the use of anesthetics in children. The current editor-in-chief is Andrew Davidson (University of Melbourne).

== Abstracting and indexing ==
The journal is abstracted and indexed in:

- PubMed

According to the Journal Citation Reports, the journal has an impact factor of 2.556 in 2020.
