= List of hospitals in Tennessee =

List of medical facilities in Tennessee

List of hospitals in Tennessee (U.S. state), sorted alphabetically.

== Operating ==
- Ascension Saint Thomas Dekalb (Smithville)
- Ascension Saint Thomas Hickman (Centerville)
- Ascension Saint Thomas Highlands (Sparta)
- Ascension Saint Thomas Midtown (Nashville)
- Ascension Saint Thomas River Park (McMinnville)
- Ascension Saint Thomas Rutherford (Murfreesboro)
- Ascension Saint Thomas Stones River (Woodbury)
- Ascension Saint Thomas West (Nashville)
- Ballad Health – Bristol Regional Medical Center (Bristol)
- Ballad Health – Franklin Woods Community Hospital (Johnson City)
- Ballad Health – Greeneville Community Hospital (Greeneville)
- Ballad Health – Holston Valley Medical Center (Kingsport)
- Ballad Health – Indian Path Community Hospital (Kingsport)
- Ballad Health – Johnson City Medical Center (Johnson City)
- Ballad Health – Sycamore Shoals Hospital (Elizabethton)
- Baptist Memorial Hospital-Carroll County (Huntingdon)
- Baptist Memorial Hospital-Collierville
- Baptist Memorial Hospital-Memphis
- Baptist Memorial Hospital-Tipton (Covington)
- Baptist Memorial Hospital-Union City
- Baptist Memorial Hospital for Women (Memphis)
- Blount Memorial Hospital (Maryville)
- Chi Memorial Hospital (Chattanooga)
- Cookeville Regional Medical Center
- Cumberland Medical Center (Crossville)
- Dolly Parton Children's Hospital (Knoxville)
- Erlanger Health System (Chattanooga)
- Fort Sanders Regional Medical Center (Knoxville)
- Highpoint Health – Winchester (Winchester)
- Jackson-Madison County General Hospital
- Le Bonheur Children's Hospital (Memphis)
- LeConte Medical Center (Sevierville)
- Maury Regional Medical Center (Columbia)
- Methodist University Hospital (Memphis)
- Monroe Carell Jr. Children's Hospital at Vanderbilt (Nashville)
- Parkridge Medical Center (Chattanooga)
- Regional One Health (Memphis)
- St. Jude Children's Research Hospital (Memphis)
- Sweetwater Hospital Association (Sweetwater)
- Tennova Healthcare – North Knoxville Medical Center (Powell)
- Tennova Healthcare – Turkey Creek Medical Center (Knoxville)
- TriStar Centennial Medical Center (Nashville)
- TriStar Skyline Medical Center (Nashville)
- University of Tennessee Medical Center (Knoxville)
- Vanderbilt Bedford Hospital (Shelbyville)
- Vanderbilt Clarksville Hospital (Clarksville)
- Vanderbilt Tullahoma-Harton Hospital
- Vanderbilt University Hospital (Nashville)
- Vanderbilt Wilson County Hospital (Lebanon)
- Williamson Health (Franklin)

== Defunct ==
- Ashland City Medical Center (Inpatient services ceased 2024; transitioned to satellite ER/clinic status)
- Baptist Hospital (Knoxville)
- Copper Basin Medical Center (Copperhill) (Closed 2017)
- Decatur County General Hospital (Parsons) (Closed 2020)
- Jellico Medical Center (Jellico) (Closed 2021)
- McKenzie Regional Hospital (McKenzie) (Closed 2018)
- Physicians Regional Medical Center (historically known as St. Mary’s Memorial Hospital) (Knoxville) (Closed 2018)
- Starr Regional Medical Center - Etowah (Inpatient services ceased 2024)
- Unicoi County Hospital (Erwin) (Destroyed by 2024 flooding; rebuild plan announced Jan 28, 2026)

== See also ==
- List of hospitals in Nashville
- Healthcare in Tennessee
