= University of Tennessee Health Science Center =

Public medical school in Memphis, Tennessee, US

University of Tennessee
- Type: Public
- Established: 1911
- Chancellor: Peter F. Buckley
- Students: 3,139
- Location: Memphis, Tennessee, United States; 35°8′27″N 90°1′48″W
- Campus: 41 acres (17 ha)
- Website: www.uthsc.edu

The University of Tennessee Health Science Center (UTHSC) is a public medical school in Memphis, Tennessee. It includes the Colleges of Health Professions, Dentistry, Graduate Health Sciences, Medicine, Nursing, and Pharmacy. The Health Science Center is part of the statewide, multi-campus University of Tennessee system. It is classified among "R1: Doctoral Universities – Very high research activity".

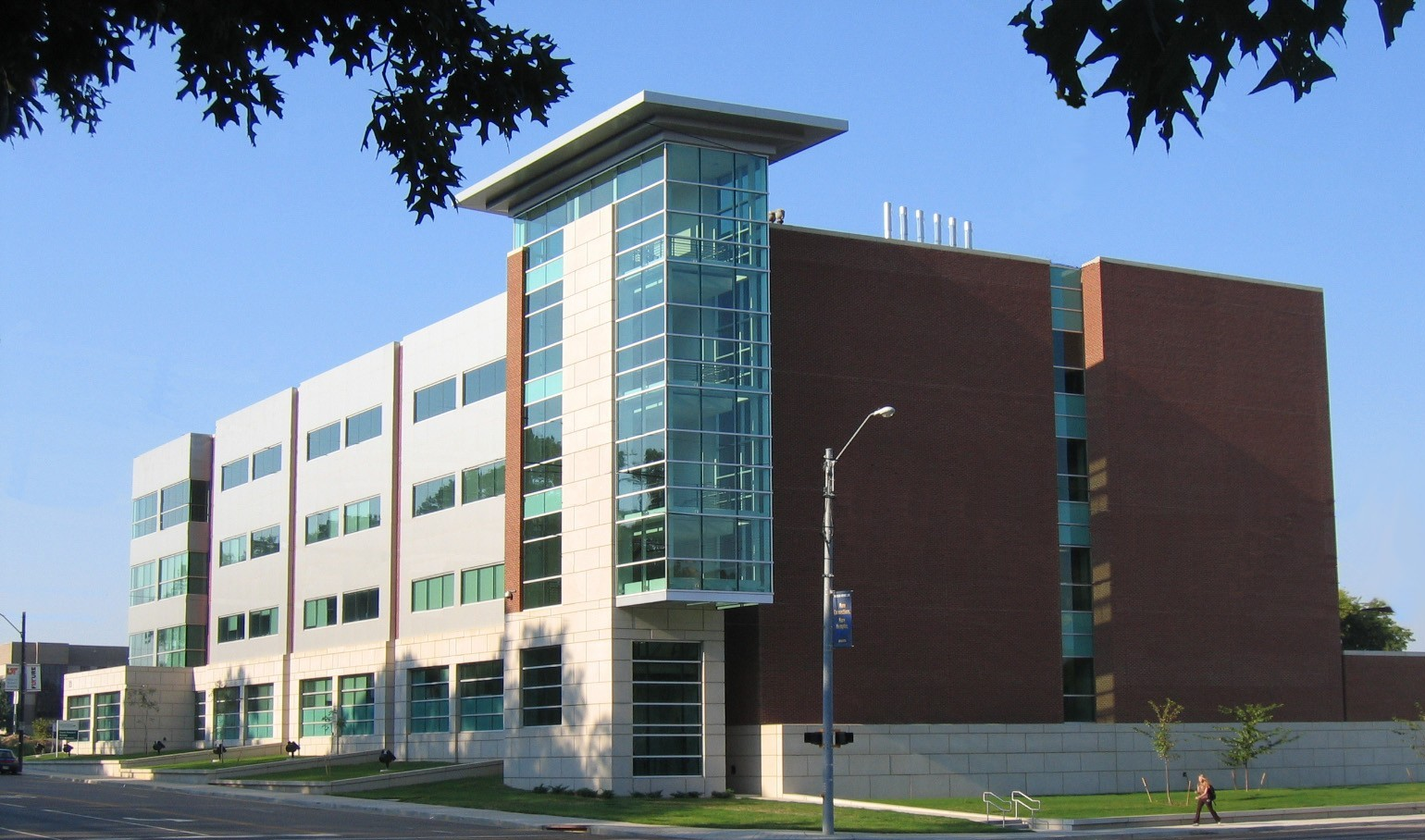
A Cancer Research Building owned by UTHSC

Graduate medical education programs are located in Chattanooga, Knoxville, and Nashville; family medicine centers in Jackson, Knoxville, and Memphis; dentistry clinics in Bristol, Jackson, and Union City, as well as public and continuing education programs across the state.

== Colleges and institutes ==
Undergraduate demographics as of Fall 2023
Race and ethnicity	Total
White	57%
Black	28%
Hispanic	6%
Asian	3%
Two or more races	3%
International student	2%
Unknown	2%
Economic diversity
Low-income (Note: The percentage of students who received an income-based federal Pell grant intended for low-income students.)	11%
Affluent (Note: The percentage of students who are a part of the American middle class at the bare minimum.)	89%

In the Medical District of Memphis, The University of Tennessee Health Science Center includes six colleges. In its early years the school was segregated, and it desegregated in the early 1960s. The first black student, Alvin Crawford, graduated in 1964.

The University of Tennessee Health Science Center also runs the Plough Center for Sterile Drug Delivery Systems. The center educates on sterile product preparation, develops a basis for parenteral medications, and provides services to the pharmaceutical industry and individuals.

=== College of Dentistry ===
Founded in 1878, the college is the oldest dental school in the South. It has more than 7,600 alumni. An estimated 75 percent of practicing dentists in Tennessee are alumni of the UTHSC College of Dentistry.

The college offers a full range of advanced training in prosthodontics, oral surgery, endodontics, periodontics, orthodontics, and pediatric dentistry, and a two-year program in dental hygiene.

=== College of Graduate Health Sciences ===
Founded in 1928, the college offers programs in advanced graduate degrees in programs including biomedical engineering and imaging, dental science (master's only), epidemiology (master's only), health outcomes and policy research, biomedical sciences (master's only), integrated program in biomedical sciences (PhD), nursing, pharmaceutical sciences, pharmacology (master's), and speech and hearing science.

=== College of Health Professions ===
Founded in 1972, the college has more than 9,000 alumni. It offers programs of study in audiology and speech pathology on the Knoxville campus and clinical laboratory sciences, health informatics and information management (online program), occupational therapy, and physical therapy on the Memphis campus. The college offers traditional, online, and distance learning.

=== College of Medicine ===
With more than 16,000 alumni, 25 departments on the Memphis campus, ten departments on the Knoxville campus, ten departments on the Chattanooga campus, and 84 Graduate Medical Education training programs, the University of Tennessee College of Medicine is the largest medical school in the state of Tennessee. Students train on the Memphis campus in their first two years and then rotate across the three campuses during their clinical training. The College of Medicine also trains Physician Assistants. The University of Tennessee Health Science Center currently is the only state-supported Physician Assistant program in the state of Tennessee.

The UTHSC pediatric residency program is affiliated with Le Bonheur Children's Medical Center, and residents in pediatrics, radiology, and other fields spend time working at St. Jude Children's Research Hospital in Memphis.

Areas of excellence include the Center for Addiction Sciences, which was named in 2016 as the first center of excellence in addiction medicine in the country by the Addiction Medicine Foundation, three trauma centers, a burn center, a transplant institute, and a maternal-fetal medicine institute. The college also operates the UTHSC College of Medicine Mobile Stroke Unit, the world's first mobile stroke unit with advanced CT imaging capabilities, including CT angiography imaging for the brain and blood vessels. The college also has a clinical practice, University Clinical Health.

=== College of Nursing ===
Tracing its history to 1898, making it the oldest nursing college in the state of Tennessee, the UTHSC College of Nursing offers three degree programs: BSN, DNP, and PhD.

The college also offers RNs the option to earn the BSN degree online. The college has more than 5,400 alumni and an estimated 2,000 practicing nurses in the state of Tennessee.

=== College of Pharmacy ===
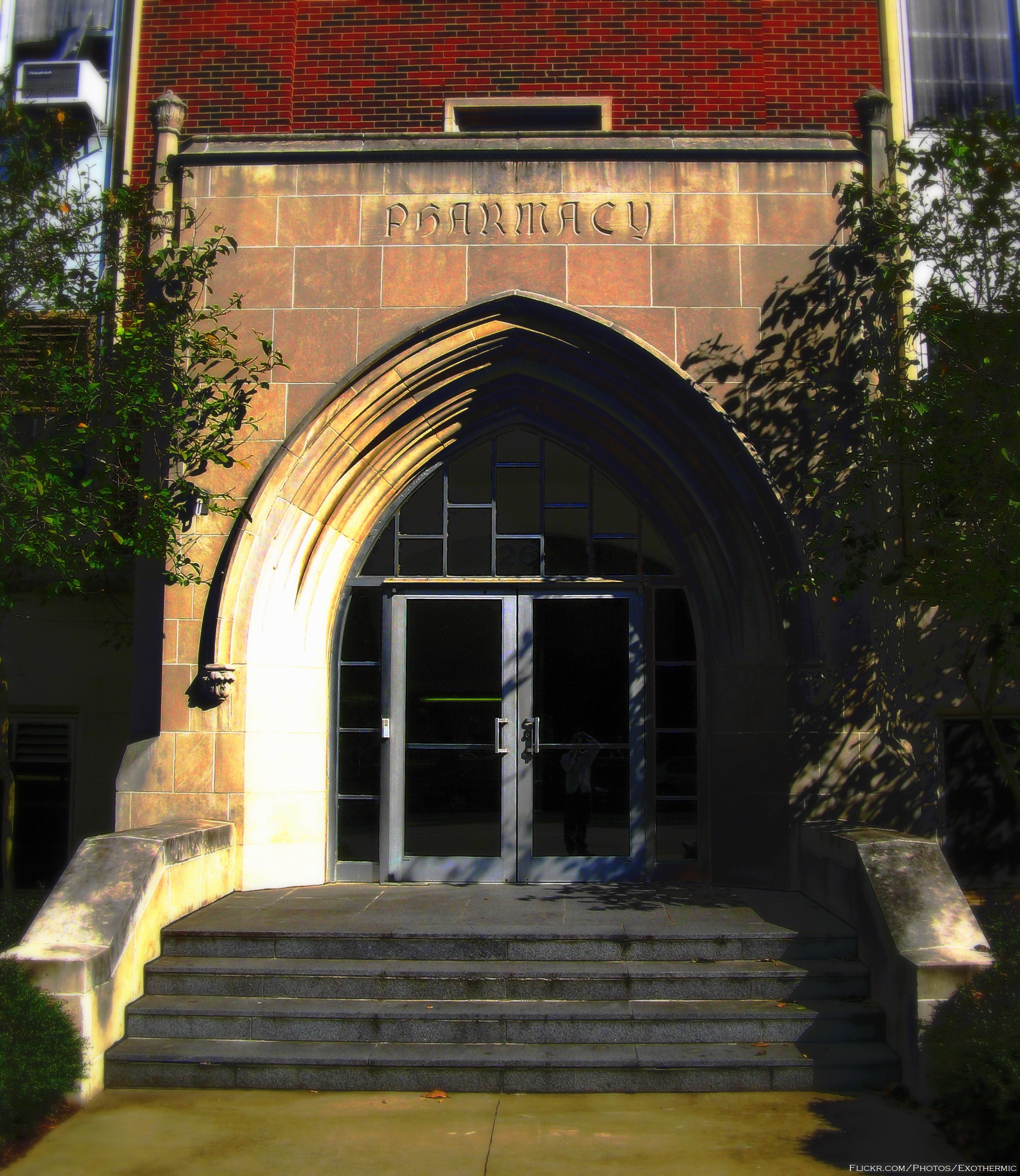
The entrance to the old pharmacy building on the campus of the University of Tennessee in Memphis

Founded in 1898, the college has campuses in Memphis, Nashville, and Knoxville. Degrees offered are the Doctor of Pharmacy (PharmD), Doctor of Philosophy in Pharmaceutical Sciences (PhD), dual PharmD/PhD, dual PharmD/Master of Health Informatics and Information Management, and dual PharmD/Master of Business Administration.

=== Hamilton Eye Institute ===
The Hamilton Eye Institute, located in Memphis, is the department of ophthalmology. It opened in 2004 in an eight-story building donated to the University of Tennessee by Baptist Memorial Hospital-Memphis. The capital campaign to establish the institute was initiated by department chair Barrett G. Haik, MD, FACS, and led by Robert B. Carter, chief information officer and executive vice-president of FedEx Information Services. The institute was named for the family of Ralph S. Hamilton, MD, a professor, and physician with the department, who contributed $6 million toward its construction.

== Accreditation ==
The Health Science Center is accredited by the Commission on Colleges of the Southern Association of Colleges and Schools to award baccalaureate, master's, and doctoral degrees.

== Rankings ==
Institutional rankings
Ranking body	Scope	Rank	Year	Ref.
Center for World University Rankings (CWUR)	United States	136	2026	
Center for World University Rankings (CWUR)	World	544	2026	

In the 2026 Center for World University Rankings (CWUR), UTHSC ranked 544th worldwide and 136th in the United States, placing it in the top 2.6% of institutions included in the ranking.

U.S. News & World Report program rankings
Program	Ranking category	Rank	Edition	Ref.
Pharmacy	National pharmacy schools	16	2026	
Bachelor of Science in Nursing	Public undergraduate nursing programs	18	2026	

== Notable people ==
=== Alumni ===
- Winfield C. Dunn, DDS, Class of 1955, Tennessee Governor 1971–1975
- Christopher Duntsch, neurosurgeon sentenced to life in prison for intentionally botching 32 surgeries that killed two patients and paralyzed two others
- William E. Evans, PharmD, Class of 1975, director and CEO of St. Jude Children's Research Hospital from 2004 to 2014.
- Deborah Ferguson, DDS. American politician and member of the Arkansas House of Representatives representing District 51 since January 14, 2013
- Randy McNally, MPharm, Class of 1969, Lieutenant Governor of Tennessee 2017–present.
- Rhea Seddon, MD, Class of 1973, former NASA astronaut and eighth woman inducted into the U.S. Astronaut Hall of Fame

=== Faculty ===
- Samuel Dagogo-Jack, MD, professor of medicine; director of the Division of Endocrinology, Diabetes, Metabolism, and director of the Clinical Research Center; leader in diabetes research; past president of the American Diabetes Association
- Lori Stewart Gonzalez, 23rd president of Ohio University
