= Johnson City Medical Center =

- Ballad Health

Geography
- Location: 400 North State of Franklin Road, Johnson City, Tennessee, Tennessee, United States
- Coordinates: 36.30749°N 82.38446°W

Organization
- Type: General medical and surgical

Services
- Emergency department: Level I trauma center
- Beds: 514

History
- Opened: 1911

Links
- Website: https://www.balladhealth.org/jcmc
- Lists: Hospitals in Tennessee

Johnson City Medical Center is a hospital in Johnson City, Tennessee. It is a Level I Trauma Center and one of three major tertiary referral hubs of regional provider Ballad Health. It has 445 beds, plus 86 in the attached Niswonger Children's Hospital. It is also a teaching hospital for numerous institutions, including the adjacent East Tennessee State University James H. Quillen College of Medicine.

Physician and author Abraham Verghese described his experiences treating HIV in the 1980s at Johnson City Medical Center, as well as the neighboring Mountain Home VA Medical Center, in his memoir My Own Country.

Since 2018 the facility has been operated by Ballad Health.
