= Bill Bain (consultant) =

American management consultant (1937–2018)

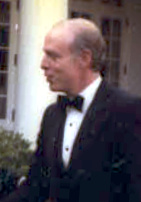
- Bill Bain in 1981
- Born: William Worthington Bain Jr. July 30, 1937; Johnson City, Tennessee, U.S.
- Died: January 16, 2018 (aged 80); Naples, Florida, U.S.
- Education: Vanderbilt University (BA)
- Occupations: Consultant, management expert
- Known for: Bain & Company, Bain Capital

William Worthington Bain Jr. (July 30, 1937 – January 16, 2018) was an American management consultant, known for his role as one of the founders of the management consultancy that bears his name, Bain & Company. Prior to founding Bain & Company, he was a vice-president at the Boston Consulting Group (BCG).

== Early life ==
William Bain was born on July 30, 1937, in Johnson City, Tennessee, to William Worthington Bain Sr. and his wife, Ruby Kathleen Bain (née Cloyd). His father was a small food wholesaler who had little formal education and came from a farming family with eleven siblings. He graduated from Science Hill High School in 1955.

Later, he attended East Tennessee State College, majoring in engineering, for two years before transferring to Vanderbilt University, where he was a member of the Pi Kappa Alpha fraternity. He graduated in 1959, earning Phi Beta Kappa honors, with a degree in history. He then got married and became a father. He did graduate work in history at Vanderbilt as a Woodrow Wilson Scholar in 1960.

== Career ==
Bain briefly worked at a steel fabricating company, where he'd held summer jobs, before returning to Vanderbilt in 1960 to work as the school's director of development at the age of 26. In this capacity, he met Bruce Henderson, the founder of the Boston Consulting Group. After meeting Henderson, Bain agreed to join BCG in 1967 at a starting salary of $17,000 per year and moved from Nashville to Boston.

In the early 1970s, Bain was considered internally at Boston Consulting Group to be Henderson's eventual successor. However, in 1973 Bain resigned from BCG to start his own strategy consulting firm. Bain quickly recruited Black & Decker and Texas Instruments, two BCG clients, as his own clients, and hired away seven of BCG's employees. Bain's new company diverged from other consulting firms of the time by focusing on longer assignments. He also sought to develop close relations with the companies, helping not only to devise strategy but also to implement it. He also promised not to represent more than one client per industry, and for many years would only accept assignments that reported to the client's CEO. One account portrayed Bain as so obsessively secretive about the guidance it offered its clients that the firm earned the nickname "the KGB of consulting".

He formed Bain Capital, a private equity firm, in 1984, and appointed Mitt Romney, one of the partners at Bain & Company, to be Bain Capital's first CEO. In explaining the value of his company to clients, he maintained that Bain allows them "to isolate the small numbers of decisions that are going to have an impact", making it possible to manage big diversified companies.

After leaving Bain, he was chairman of the board of Bain Willard Companies, L.P., which he co-founded in 1993 with Ralph R. Willard, President of Bain. He was also a director of Hinckley Yachts.

== Charitable work ==
Bain was a longtime trustee of several children’s charities in Boston, including Children’s Hospital Boston, The Boys and Girls Clubs of Boston and the Posse Foundation. He also served on the board of trust of Vanderbilt University. and was a trustee of the Naples Children and Education Foundation in Naples, Florida from 2002 until his death.

== Personal life ==
Bain was married three times and fathered four children.

He had been suffering from Alzheimer's disease and died aged 80 at his home in Naples, Florida in early 2018.

== Bibliography ==
- Kiechel, Walter (2010). The Lords of Strategy: The Secret Intellectual History of the New Corporate World. Harvard Business Press. ISBN 978-1-5913-9782-3.
