= Science Hill High School =

Location
- 1509 John Exum Parkway; Johnson City, Tennessee 37604; United States; 36°19′32″N 82°22′10″W

Information
- Type: Public high school
- Founded: August 24, 1868
- School district: Johnson City Schools
- Superintendent: Dr. Erin Slater
- CEEB code: 431010
- Principal: Dr. Carmen Bryant
- Faculty: 157.98 (FTE)
- Grades: 9–12
- Enrollment: 2373
- Student to teacher ratio: 15.34
- Color
- Nickname: Hilltoppers
- Rival: Dobyns-Bennett
- Newspaper: Hilltopper Herald
- Feeder schools: Liberty Bell Middle School, Indian Trail Middle School
- Website: sciencehill.jcschools.org

Science Hill High School is a public high school in Johnson City, Tennessee, United States.

== Campus ==
The Science Hill/ Liberty Bell/ Freedom Hall complex includes multiple athletic fields, large parking lots, and a 1 1/2-mile walking track that encircles the complex. The athletic facilities include the Freedom Hall Civic Center and Kermit Tipton Stadium

== Music ==
Science Hill High School's marching band appeared in the 2009 Tournament of Roses Parade in Pasadena, California. and participants in Bands of America.

== Notable alumni ==
- Bill Bain, management consultant known for being a founder of management consultancy Bain & Company
- John Bowers, author
- Ernie Ferrell Bowman, Major League Baseball (MLB) infielder
- Larry Butler, Canadian Football League (CFL) player
- Jonny Campbell, professional soccer player
- Will Craig, MLB first baseman
- Matt Czuchry, actor
- Lindsay Ellis, film critic, author (Axiom's End)
- Aubrayo Franklin, National Football League (NFL) player
- Wyck Godfrey, film producer and executive
- Jenna Hutchins, runner
- Landon Knack, baseball player
- Will Little, baseball umpire
- John Alan Maxwell, American artist and illustrator
- Joe McClain, MLB pitcher
- Daniel Norris, MLB pitcher
- Mo Sabri, recording artist
- Steve Spurrier, football coach, athlete, and Heisman Trophy winner
- Van Williams, NFL player
