= Landon Knack =

American baseball player (born 1997)

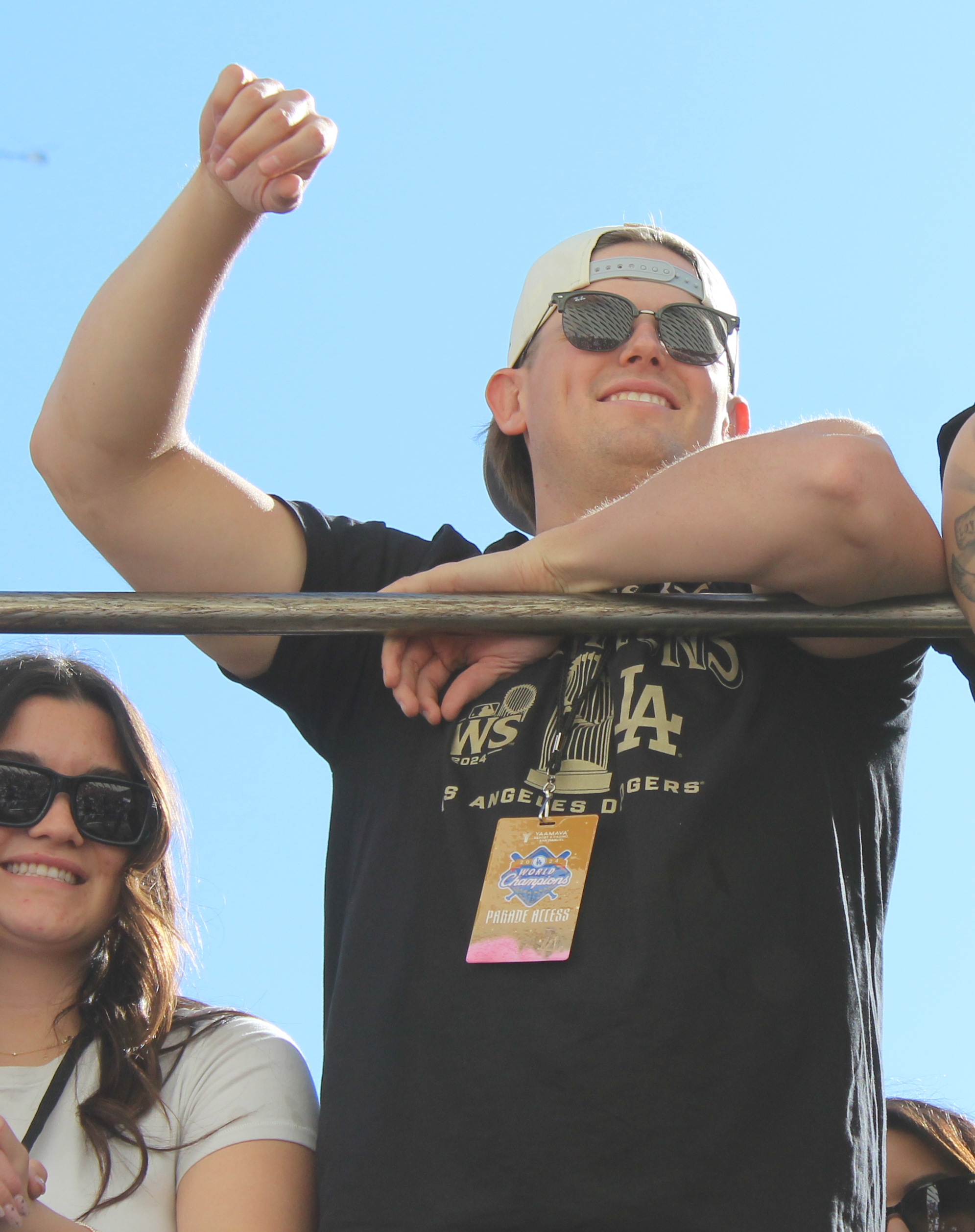
- Knack at the 2024 championship parade

Los Angeles Dodgers – No. 96
- Pitcher
- Born: July 15, 1997 (age 29); Johnson City, Tennessee, U.S.
- Bats: Left Throws: Right

MLB debut
- April 17, 2024, for the Los Angeles Dodgers

MLB statistics (through 2026 season)
- Win–loss record: 7–7
- Earned run average: 4.10
- Strikeouts: 119
- Stats at Baseball Reference

Teams
- Los Angeles Dodgers (2024–present)

Career highlights and awards
- World Series champion (2024)

Landon Dakota Knack (born July 15, 1997) is an American professional baseball pitcher for the Los Angeles Dodgers of Major League Baseball (MLB). He made his MLB debut in 2024.

== Amateur career ==
Knack attended Science Hill High School in Johnson City, Tennessee, and East Tennessee State University, where he played college baseball for the East Tennessee State Buccaneers.

== Professional career ==
Knack was drafted by the Los Angeles Dodgers in the second round of the 2020 MLB draft. He did not play in a game in 2020 due to the cancellation of the minor league season because of the COVID-19 pandemic.

Knack made his professional debut in 2021 with the Great Lakes Loons and was promoted to the Tulsa Drillers during the season. Between the two levels, he was 7–1 with a 3.18 ERA in 16 appearances (11 starts) and struck out 82 batters while only walking eight. He was selected to play for the Glendale Desert Dogs of the Arizona Fall League after the season. In 2022, he made 17 starts for Tulsa, with a 2–10 record and 5.01 ERA.

Knack returned to Tulsa to start the 2023 season, making 12 starts with a 2–0 record, 2.20 ERA and 61 strikeouts in 57 1/3 innings. On June 17, he was promoted to the Triple-A Oklahoma City Dodgers, where he made 10 starts, with a 3–1 record, 2.93 ERA and 38 strikeouts in 43 innings.

Knack was added to the Dodgers 40-man roster on November 14, 2023, in order to be protected from the Rule 5 draft and he made the Dodgers' Opening Day roster for the 2024 season. However, he did not pitch in either of the Dodgers two games in Seoul, South Korea as part of the MLB World Tour and was optioned back to Oklahoma City for the start of the minor league season. Knack drew the start for Oklahoma City on opening day and struck out six in five scoreless innings. He was promoted to the majors again and made his debut as the starting pitcher against the Washington Nationals on April 17, allowing two runs on four hits with one walk and four strikeouts. His first MLB strikeout was of Nick Senzel. He picked up his first major league win on April 24, also against the Nationals. Overall, Knack was 3–5 with a 3.65 ERA in 15 games (12 starts) with 69 strikeouts in the majors and 4–3 with a 3.71 ERA in 14 games (12 starts) in the minors.

Knack made the postseason roster for the Dodgers and pitched one scoreless inning in the National League Division Series (NLDS). However, he struggled in his next appearance, in Game 2 of the National League Championship Series (NLCS), allowing five runs on five hits and three walks in only two innings. In the 2024 World Series, Knack pitched four innings in Game 4, allowing one run on two hits and one walk, while striking out two. The Dodgers won the series in five games over the New York Yankees.

In the 2025 season, Knack made seven starts for the Dodgers (and three relief appearances), with a 3–2 record and 4.89 ERA. He spent most of the season with Oklahoma City, where he made 21 appearances (18 starts) with a 6–6 record and 7.01 ERA.

Knack began the 2026 campaign on the injured list due to an intercostal strain and was placed on the 60-day injured list on April 28, 2026. Knack was activated for his season debut on July 11, though he made only four appearances for the Dodgers during the season, allowing five runs on 12 hits in 11 2/3 innings of bulk relief work. In the minors he made eight starts for Oklahoma City and had a 2.08 ERA in 34 2/3 innings.
