= East Tennessee State University =

Public university in Johnson City, Tennessee, US

Coordinates: 36.30333°N 82.36917°W

- Former names: East Tennessee State Normal School (1911–1925); East Tennessee State Teachers College (1925–1930); East Tennessee State Teacher's College, Johnson City (1930–1943); East Tennessee State College (1943–1963)
- Motto: "Go Beyond"
- Slogan: "Flagship of Appalachia"
- Type: Public research university
- Established: October 2, 1911; 115 years ago
- Accreditation: SACS
- Academic affiliations: ORAU; Space-grant
- Endowment: $198.25 million (2025)
- President: Brian Noland
- Provost: Kimberly D. McCorkle
- Faculty: 841
- Students: 13,728
- Undergraduates: 10,829
- Postgraduates: 2,889
- Location: Johnson City, Tennessee, United States
- Campus: 366 acres (148 ha); Small city
- Other locations: Chattanooga; Elizabethton; Kingsport; Sevierville
- Newspaper: East Tennessean
- Colors: Navy blue and gold
- Nickname: Buccaneers
- Sporting affiliations: NCAA Division I FCS – SoCon
- Mascot: Bucky
- Website: etsu.edu

East Tennessee State University (ETSU) is a public research university in Johnson City, Tennessee, United States. As of 2026, it is the fourth-largest university in the state by student enrollment. In addition to its main campus, ETSU has facilities in Kingsport, Elizabethton, Chattanooga, and Sevierville.

ETSU, home of the James H. Quillen College of Medicine, is the academic partner for Ballad Health, the largest healthcare provider in the Tri-Cities. ETSU grants terminal degrees in many health professions, including medicine, biomedical sciences, nursing, occupational therapy, psychology, public health, and pharmacy. ETSU, which uses the slogan "Flagship of Appalachia," has several programs relating to Appalachian cultural heritage, including the Archives of Appalachia and the nation's only Appalachian Studies Department and oldest Bluegrass, Roots, and Old-Time Music degree program. The university is organized into ten colleges and offers about 180 academic programs, including 59 graduate degree programs. The East Tennessee State Buccaneers compete in the NCAA Division I Southern Conference.

ETSU is classified among "R2: Doctoral Universities – High research activity". In 2025, ETSU reached the single-year research requirements for status as an R1 for the first time, though Carnegie Classifications use a three-year average.

== History ==
ETSU was founded as East Tennessee State Normal School in 1911 to educate teachers. ETSU's K–12 training school, the University School, is still operational. ETSU has been coeducational since its foundation.

East Tennessee State became a college in 1925 when it changed its name to East Tennessee State Teachers College, subsequently gaining accreditation from the Southern Association of Colleges and Secondary Schools in 1927. By 1930, the school's name had changed again to East Tennessee State Teacher's College, Johnson City. In 1943, East Tennessee State Teacher's College was expanded into a college with a range of liberal arts offerings, becoming East Tennessee State College. East Tennessee did not enjoy the early support of the broader population of Tennessee legislators, who made the foundation of the school a low priority, and in 1936 even debated closing the college, calling it "an unnecessary luxury."

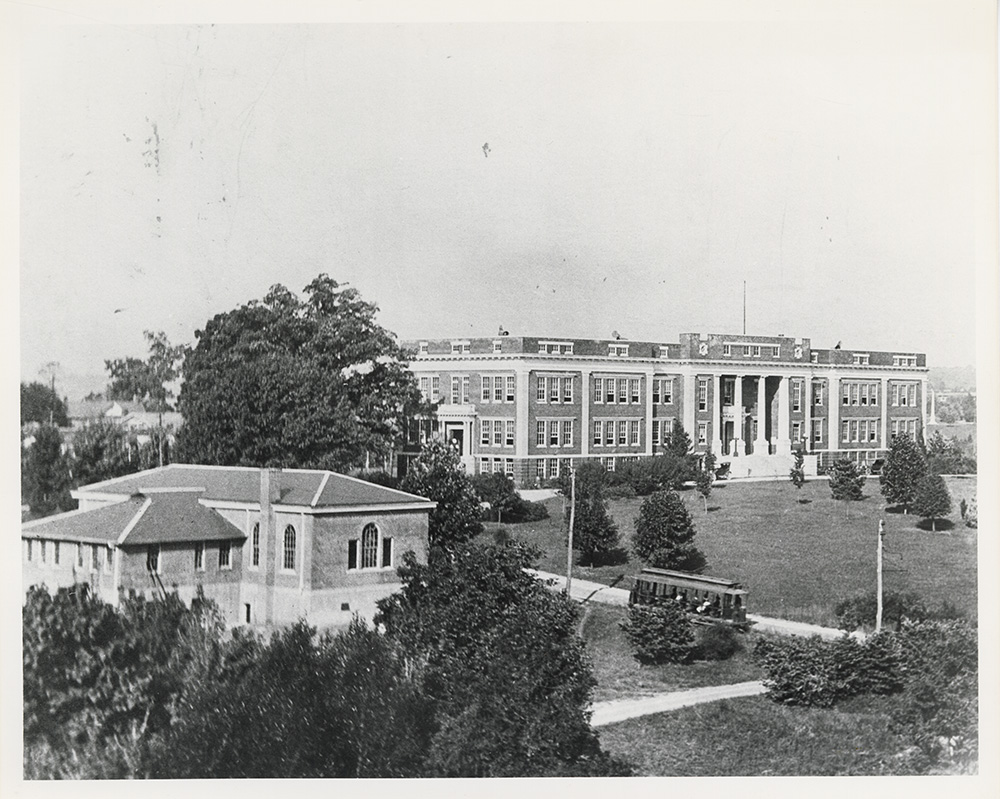
Gilbreath Hall at East Tennessee State University as a tram passes by it

In 1951, ETSC awarded its first master's degree. The college became East Tennessee State University in 1963, adopting the name it holds today. From 1938 to 1967, ETSU had a controversial freshman-initiation tradition known as Rat Week. Freshmen were reportedly required to wear "rat hats," forbidden from using sidewalks or main entrances, asked to clean the administration building with toothbrushes, and by the 1950s expected to bow to Captain Kidd, the university's live goat mascot. In 1967, student body president Jerry S. Jones abolished the practice, insisting homecoming should be "for" freshmen rather than "at" them.

ETSU was one of the two earliest public universities in Tennessee to desegregate at the undergraduate level, alongside Austin Peay. One of the four students in the inaugural integrated class, Mary Wagner, described it as a "quiet integration." While ETSU desegregated at the undergraduate level in 1958, it admitted its first black student, Eugene Carruthers, as a graduate student two years prior. In 1970, President Richard Nixon spoke at ETSU.

In 1961, ETSU received the personal library of Congressman B. Carroll Reece; its history museum was formally dedicated as the Reece Museum in 1965. In 1968, the men's basketball team reached the NCAA Sweet Sixteen for the first time, and the 1969 East Tennessee State Buccaneers football team went undefeated, winning the Ohio Valley Conference and defeating Louisiana Tech 34–14 in the Grantland Rice Bowl. In 1972, ETSU student Neil Cusack won the NCAA individual cross-country championship; he went on to win the Boston Marathon in 1974. In 1973, Shelbridge became the president's official residence. The following year saw the founding of WETS-FM, the NPR member station serving the Tri-Cities, and the beginning of ETSU's medical school.

ETSU's effort to establish Tennessee's second medical school began with a 1961 report by President Burgin Dossett proposing a second state medical school. In the mid-1960s, physician Charles Ed Allen assembled data showing that Upper East Tennessee had roughly half as many physicians per capita as the national average and drew attention to the fact that Johnson City was geographically closer to Canada than to Tennessee's only medical school at the time, which was in Memphis. The University of Tennessee and Governor Winfield Dunn opposed the development of a medical school at ETSU. The Tennessee General Assembly eventually authorized ETSU to seek federal funds following the 1972 Teague-Cranston Act, which provided funding for new medical schools associated with Veterans Administration medical centers in underserved areas. Dunn vetoed the authorization, but the legislature overrode the veto by a vote of 51–37.

In 1978, ETSU founded the Archives of Appalachia. In 1979, ETSU player Atlee Hammaker was selected in the first round of the MLB Draft. Jack Tottle founded ETSU's Bluegrass, Old-Time, and Roots Music program in 1982. Bluegrass Today describes it as the oldest such program in the world. In 1980, ETSU hosted the inaugural NCAA Rifle Championship.

In May 2000, Tennessee Department of Transportation crews widening a road discovered the Gray Fossil Site, an early-Pliocene fossil site. The site's exceptional preservation and diversity contributed to ETSU's development of a paleontology graduate program. In 2007, a museum opened at the Gray Fossil Site. ETSU announced plans to open the Gatton College of Pharmacy in 2005, and in 2010 accreditation was granted. In 2022, Gatton received the American Association of Colleges of Pharmacy's Lawrence C. Weaver Transformative Community Service Award. The College of Public Health began offering the DrPH in 2006 and received CEPH accreditation in 2009, becoming the first school of public health in Tennessee to hold that accreditation.

In late 2009, the Tennessee Higher Education Commission and the Tennessee Board of Regents authorized the formation of a Ph.D. program in Sport Physiology and Performance, the first such program in the United States. In 2014, President Brian Noland argued for the merger of the Tri-Cities' two largest health systems, Mountain States and Wellmont, rather than an acquisition by an outside health system. The resulting healthcare provider, Ballad Health, made ETSU its designated educational provider. Ballad provides ETSU with significant financial support, including both compensation for services provided and research funds.

In 2019, ETSU founded the Center for Rural Health Research with both state funding and an equivalent funding match from Ballad Health. Today, it is one of ten federally funded rural health research centers nationally. In 2022, ETSU and BlueCross BlueShield of Tennessee launched the BlueSky Tennessee Institute, a 27-month Bachelor's degree in computing based at BlueCross's Chattanooga headquarters. ETSU also launched a doctorate in Occupational Therapy in 2022. Between 2023 and 2025, ETSU produced Rhodes Scholarship finalists in three successive years. In 2026, ETSU launched an M.S. in Environment, Health and Disaster Sciences, described by the university as the first in Tennessee.

=== Presidents ===
- Sidney G. Gilbreath, 1911–1925
- Charles C. Sherrod, 1925–1949
- Burgin E. Dossett Sr., 1949–1968
- D.P. Culp, 1968–1977
- Arthur H. DeRosier Jr., 1977–1980
- Ronald E. Beller, 1980–1991
- Bert C. Bach (interim), 1991–1992
- Roy S. Nicks, 1992–1996
- Paul E. Stanton Jr., 1997–2012
- Brian Noland, 2012–present

== Campus ==
East Tennessee State University's Main Campus is 366 acres approximately 1.5 miles from downtown Johnson City. The core of the Main Campus is located in between the Buffalo Mountain ridge and a stream vale, and laid out such that the buildings parallel the ridge line of the mountain. Most campus buildings are in a neo-Georgian style, and clad in red brick.

ETSU's Main Campus dates to the contribution of a 120 acre farm by George Lafayette Carter, an industrialist involved in the development of several of the region's railroads. The Main Campus supports most of ETSU's academic programs save those health sciences programs which are on the historic Mountain Home, Tennessee campus shared with the VA Hospital about a half-mile away. The Main Campus is served by Johnson City Transit, including the BUCSHOT circulator. ETSU students, faculty, and staff receive free transit on all fixed route Johnson City Transit services.

=== History of the Main Campus ===
The Main Campus originally consisted of five buildings dating to 1911 and designed by the Baumann brothers: two dormitories, a dining hall, the president's home, the administration building, and the heating plant.

In August 2026, ETSU opened the $63 million New Academic Building to provide improved space for General Education classes. The building was designed by Clark Nexsen in a Georgian-inspired style. ETSU currently has two major projects under construction: the $100 million renovation of Brown Hall and the construction of the Integrated Health Sciences Building.

The south end of ETSU's campus, south of a CSX railroad bypass that cuts through campus, is mostly woods. The area is called University Woods. 30 acres are preserved by an agreement with the Old-Growth Forest Network. The remaining 50 acres or so are undeveloped. A series of walking and mountain bike trails includes almost 5 miles of trails on campus, according to the mountain bike club.

== Academics ==
Undergraduate demographics as of Fall 2023
Race and ethnicity	Total
White	73%
Unknown	9%
Black	6%
Hispanic	4%
Two or more races	3%
International student	2%
Asian	2%
Economic diversity
Low-income (Note: The percentage of students who received an income-based federal Pell grant intended for low-income students.)	39%
Affluent (Note: The percentage of students who are a part of the American middle class at the bare minimum.)	61%

=== Colleges and schools ===
- College of Arts and Sciences
- College of Business and Technology
- College of Clinical and Rehabilitative Health Sciences
- Clemmer College
- James H. Quillen College of Medicine
- College of Nursing
- College of Pharmacy
- College of Public Health
- Honors College
- School of Continuing Studies
- School of Graduate Studies

=== Honors College ===
There is an Honors College at East Tennessee State University.

=== Charles C. Sherrod Library ===
The Charles C. Sherrod Library houses the Archives of Appalachia and University Archives.

== Athletics ==
East Tennessee State athletics logo

ETSU collegiate athletic teams, nicknamed Buccaneers, compete in the NCAA Division I Southern Conference. The Buccaneers rejoined the Southern Conference in July 2014 after competing in the Atlantic Sun since 2003, when they dropped football. In the 2006-07 year, ETSU won both the conference's men and women's All-Sport trophies, winning seven team titles. They repeated as the overall and men's All-Sport champions in 2007–08 with three team titles, in 2008–09 with five team titles, and in 2009–10 with three team titles.

Current men's sports at ETSU are football, baseball, basketball, cross country, golf, soccer, tennis, and track and field. Women's sports are basketball, cross country, golf, soccer, softball, tennis, track and field and volleyball. Men's soccer competed at the club level in the fall of 2007, before entering NCAA and Atlantic Sun competition as a scholarship program in the 2008 season.

With of the addition of football, ETSU rejoined the Southern Conference in 2014 because the A-Sun does not support the sport.

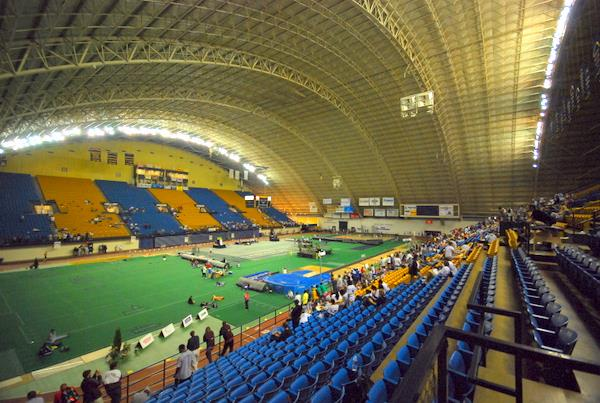
ETSU/Mountain States Health Alliance Athletic Center, also known as the Mini Dome

The Mini-Dome on the campus of ETSU houses the intercollegiate athletics offices. Still known by students, faculty, and the community as the Mini-Dome, this campus landmark was officially renamed from "Memorial Center" to "ETSU/Mountain States Health Alliance Athletic Center" and now "Ballad Health Athletic Center".

The largest building on the ETSU campus, it hosts several indoor track and field meets, and was once the home field for the university's football program. The Mini-Dome has hosted many non-athletic events that could not be housed in an indoor setting on most American college campuses, such as national indoor championships for free flight model aircraft. This building is also where the University holds its twice annual commencement ceremonies for Spring (May) graduates and Fall (December) graduates.

== Notable people ==
=== Alumni ===
- Donnie Abraham, football player
- Eric Axley, golfer
- Barry Bales, musician
- Timothy Busfield, actor and director
- Dave Campbell, baseball player
- Ronald E. Carrier, president of James Madison University
- Jo Carson, writer
- Keith Cate, newscaster
- Jamey Chadwell, football coach
- Kenny Chesney, entertainer
- Besse Cooper, oldest person in the world
- Patrick J. Cronin, actor
- Neil Cusack, runner
- Rhys Davies, golfer
- David Davis, politician
- David Eger, golfer
- Earl Ferrell, football player
- Ray Flynn, runner
- Thane Gash, football player
- Joseph R. Garber, author
- Eddie Golden, wrestler
- Ed Goodson, baseball player
- J. Ronnie Greer, US federal judge
- Steven M. Greer, ufologist
- Atlee Hammaker, baseball player
- Diana Harshbarger, politician
- Larry Hinson, golfer
- Mike Hulbert, golfer
- Earl Gladstone Hunt Jr., president of Emory and Henry College
- Mike Israetel, exercise scientist and bodybuilder
- Steven James, novelist
- Keith "Mister" Jennings, basketball player
- Kenneth P. Johnson, newspaper editor
- Ric Keller, US Congressman
- Amythyst Kiah, singer-songwriter artist
- R. Alan King, author
- Landon Knack, baseball player
- Dave Loggins, singer, songwriter
- Herbert Theodore Milburn, US Federal Judge
- Jim Mooney, baseball player
- Eureka O'Hara, contestant on RuPaul's Drag Race
- Seamus Power, golfer
- Barclay Radebaugh, basketball coach
- Ron Ramsey, Lieutenant Governor of Tennessee
- Debbie Ricker (born 1965), reproductive biologist and academic administrator
- Mo Sabri, recording artist
- Marcus Satterfield, football player
- Bryan Lewis Saunders, visual and performance artist
- Aaron Schoenfeld, soccer player
- Gerald Sensabaugh, football player
- Niall Shanks, philosopher
- Mike Smith, football coach
- J.C. Snead, golfer
- Adam Steffey, musician
- Harley Swift, basketball player
- Phyllis Tickle, author
- Jack Vest, football player
- Bobby Wadkins, golfer
- Harry L. Williams, businessman
- Garrett Willis, golfer
- Adrian Meronk, golfer
- Tommy Woods, basketball player

== See also ==
- East Tennessee State University Arboretum
- Gray Fossil Site
- WETS-FM
