= Aubrayo Franklin =

American football player and coach (born 1980)

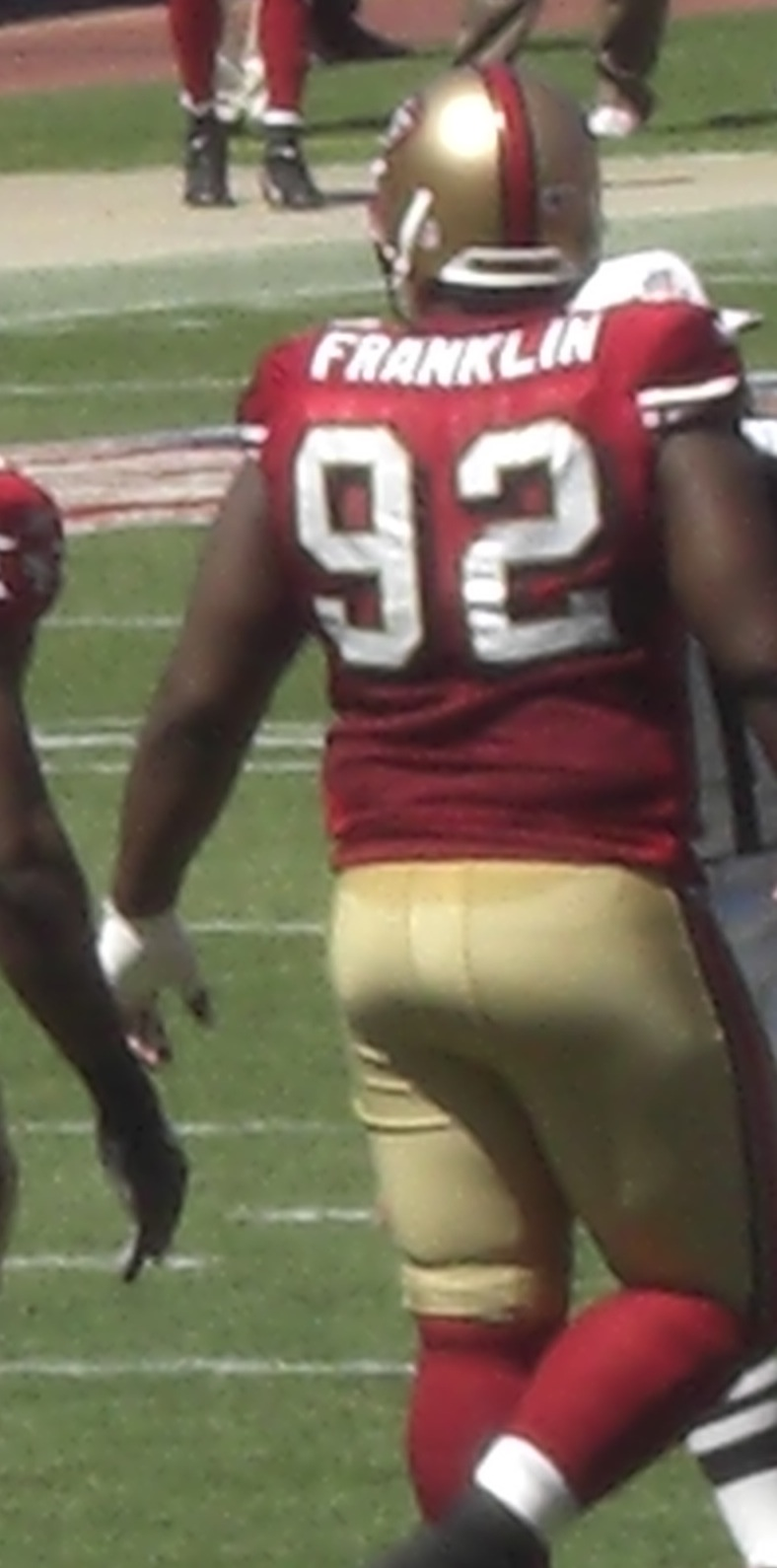
- Franklin with the San Francisco 49ers in 2008

No. 69, 91, 92, 99, 90, 97
- Position: Defensive tackle

Personal information
- Born: August 27, 1980 (age 46); Johnson City, Tennessee, U.S.
- Listed height: 6 ft 1 in (1.85 m)
- Listed weight: 320 lb (145 kg)

Career information
- High school: Science Hill (Johnson City)
- College: Tennessee
- NFL draft: 2003: 5th round, 146th overall pick

Career history

Playing
- Baltimore Ravens (2003–2006); → Frankfurt Galaxy (2004); San Francisco 49ers (2007–2010); New Orleans Saints (2011); San Diego Chargers (2012); Indianapolis Colts (2013)

Coaching
- San Francisco 49ers (2015)

Career NFL statistics
- Total tackles: 256
- Sacks: 4
- Forced fumbles: 3
- Fumble recoveries: 1
- Interceptions: 1
- Stats at Pro Football Reference

Aubrayo Razyo Franklin (/əˈbreɪ.oʊ/; born August 27, 1980) is an American former professional football player who was a nose tackle in the National Football League (NFL). He played college football for the Tennessee Volunteers and was selected by the Baltimore Ravens in the fifth round of the 2003 NFL draft.

He also played for the San Francisco 49ers, New Orleans Saints, San Diego Chargers, and Indianapolis Colts.

== Early life ==
Franklin attended Science Hill High School in Johnson City, Tennessee, and was a letterman in football. In football, as a senior, he was an All-Conference and an All-State honoree and finished his senior season with 12 sacks and 180 tackles.

== College career ==
Franklin played college football at the University of Tennessee where he recorded 70 tackles and two sacks. He majored in arts and sciences.

== Professional career ==
Pre-draft measurables
| Height | Weight | 40-yard dash | 20-yard shuttle | Vertical jump | Broad jump |
|---|---|---|---|---|---|
| 6 ft 1 3/8 in (1.86 m) | 307 lb (139 kg) | 5.1 s | 4.79 s | 27 in (0.69 m) | 8 ft 4 in (2.54 m) |
All values from NFL Combine

=== Baltimore Ravens ===
Franklin was selected by the Baltimore Ravens in the fifth round (146th overall) in the 2003 NFL draft, after being projected as a late sixth round pick. In his rookie year, he only appeared in one game recording one tackle.

He played in ten games, starting nine, for the Frankfurt Galaxy during the 2004 NFL Europe season. In his second season with the Ravens in 2004, he contributed to the team by making six appearances and two tackles. In 2005, Franklin played in 15 games and notched up 20 tackles and his first career sack at the Denver Broncos on December 11. He also made his first career start a week later against the Green Bay Packers. In his final season with the Ravens, he played in 14 games recording 17 tackles.

=== San Francisco 49ers ===
On March 3, 2007, Franklin signed with the San Francisco 49ers, reuniting himself with Coach Mike Nolan, who was his defensive coordinator in Baltimore. In his first season with the team, he played in 14 games recording a career high 28 tackles. In the 2008 season, he appeared in 16 games and started 15. He finished with one sack, 46 total tackles, two passes defended, and two forced fumbles. In the 2009 season, he started in all 16 games. He finished with two sacks, 36 total tackles, one interception, and three passes defended. In the 2010 season, he finished with 39 total tackles (38 solo), one pass defended, and one fumble recovery in 16 games and starts.

=== New Orleans Saints ===
Franklin signed a one-year contract with the New Orleans Saints on August 2, 2011. In the 2011 season, he had 18 total tackles (12 solo) in 16 games and nine starts. The Saints elected to allow Franklin to test free agency following the 2011 season.

=== San Diego Chargers ===
On July 20, 2012, Franklin signed a one-year contract with the San Diego Chargers. He appeared in 12 games and made nine starts. He finished with 20 total tackles (16 solo).

=== Indianapolis Colts ===
On March 19, 2013, Franklin signed with the Indianapolis Colts. He finished the 2013 season with 29 total tackles (17 solo) and one pass defended in 16 games and 15 starts. He started both of the Colts' postseason games.

== NFL career statistics ==
Legend
| **Bold** | Career high |

=== Regular season ===
| Year | Team | Games | | Tackles | | | | | Interceptions | | | | | Fumbles | | | |
| Year | Team | GP | GS | Cmb | Solo | Ast | Sck | TFL | Int | Yds | TD | Lng | PD | FF | FR | Yds | TD |
|---|---|---|---|---|---|---|---|---|---|---|---|---|---|---|---|---|---|
| 2003 | BAL | 1 | 0 | 1 | 1 | 0 | 0.0 | 0 | 0 | 0 | 0 | 0 | 0 | 0 | 0 | 0 | 0 |
| 2004 | BAL | 6 | 0 | 2 | 2 | 0 | 0.0 | 0 | 0 | 0 | 0 | 0 | 0 | 0 | 0 | 0 | 0 |
| 2005 | BAL | 15 | 1 | 20 | 18 | 2 | 1.0 | 1 | 0 | 0 | 0 | 0 | 1 | 0 | 0 | 0 | 0 |
| 2006 | BAL | 14 | 0 | 17 | 14 | 3 | 0.0 | 2 | 0 | 0 | 0 | 0 | 1 | 0 | 0 | 0 | 0 |
| 2007 | SFO | 14 | 13 | 28 | 19 | 9 | 0.0 | 1 | 0 | 0 | 0 | 0 | 1 | 1 | 0 | 0 | 0 |
| 2008 | SFO | **16** | 15 | **46** | 33 | **13** | 1.0 | 4 | 0 | 0 | 0 | 0 | 2 | **2** | 0 | 0 | 0 |
| 2009 | SFO | **16** | **16** | 36 | 25 | 11 | **2.0** | **7** | **1** | **10** | 0 | **10** | **3** | 0 | 0 | 0 | 0 |
| 2010 | SFO | **16** | **16** | 39 | **38** | 1 | 0.0 | 2 | 0 | 0 | 0 | 0 | 1 | 0 | **1** | 0 | 0 |
| 2011 | NOR | **16** | 9 | 18 | 12 | 6 | 0.0 | 1 | 0 | 0 | 0 | 0 | 0 | 0 | 0 | 0 | 0 |
| 2012 | SDG | 12 | 9 | 20 | 16 | 4 | 0.0 | 0 | 0 | 0 | 0 | 0 | 0 | 0 | 0 | 0 | 0 |
| 2013 | IND | **16** | 15 | 29 | 17 | 12 | 0.0 | 2 | 0 | 0 | 0 | 0 | 1 | 0 | 0 | 0 | 0 |
| Career | | 142 | 94 | 256 | 195 | 61 | 4.0 | 20 | 1 | 10 | 0 | 10 | 10 | 3 | 1 | 0 | 0 |

=== Playoffs ===
| Year | Team | Games | | Tackles | | | | | Interceptions | | | | | Fumbles | | | |
| Year | Team | GP | GS | Cmb | Solo | Ast | Sck | TFL | Int | Yds | TD | Lng | PD | FF | FR | Yds | TD |
|---|---|---|---|---|---|---|---|---|---|---|---|---|---|---|---|---|---|
| 2006 | BAL | 1 | 0 | 1 | 0 | **1** | 0.0 | 0 | 0 | 0 | 0 | 0 | 0 | 0 | 0 | 0 | 0 |
| 2011 | NOR | **2** | 1 | 1 | 0 | **1** | 0.0 | 0 | 0 | 0 | 0 | 0 | 0 | 0 | 0 | 0 | 0 |
| 2013 | IND | **2** | **2** | **2** | **2** | 0 | 0.0 | **1** | 0 | 0 | 0 | 0 | 0 | 0 | 0 | 0 | 0 |
| Career | | 5 | 3 | 4 | 2 | 2 | 0.0 | 1 | 0 | 0 | 0 | 0 | 0 | 0 | 0 | 0 | 0 |

== Coaching career ==
On January 28, 2015, Franklin rejoined the 49ers to an entry-level coaching position under head coach Jim Tomsula, who was his defensive line coach from 2007 to 2010. After just 1 season, Tomsula was fired thus resulting in a large coaching overhaul that relieved Franklin of his duties.
