= WETS-FM =

Public radio station in Johnson City, Tennessee

Coordinates: 36.434°N 82.135°W

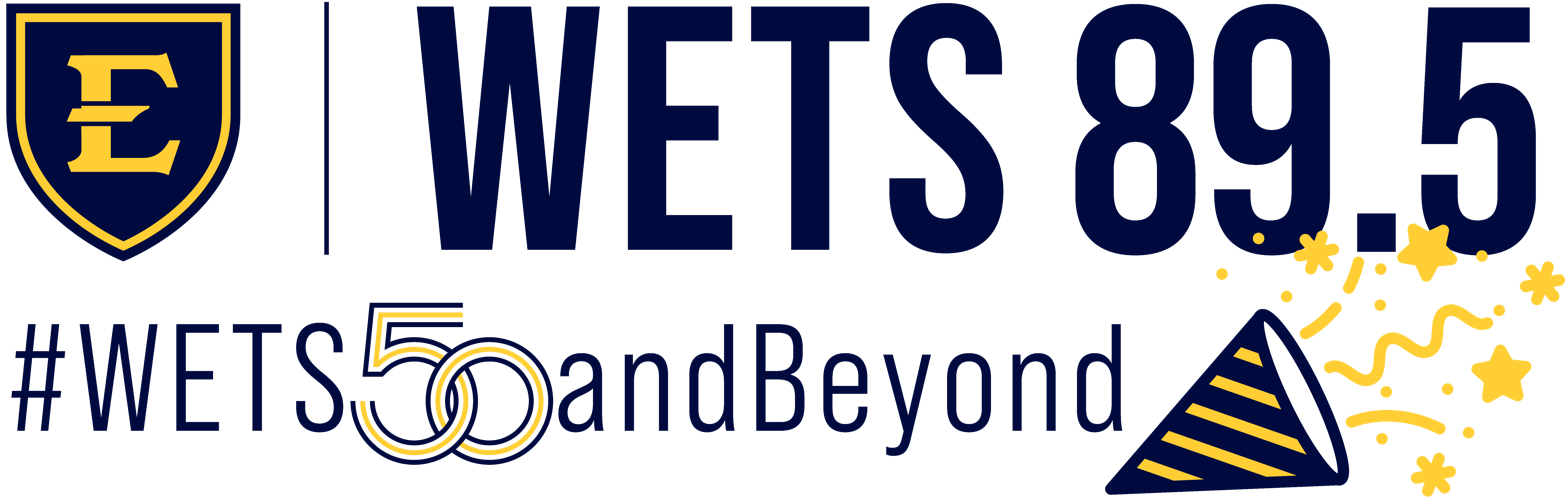
- Johnson City, Tennessee; United States
- Broadcast area: Tri-Cities, Tennessee-Virginia
- Frequency: 89.5 MHz (HD Radio)
- Branding: WETS FM 89.5

Programming
- Format: Public radio and talk
- Subchannels: HD2: Americana music; HD3: Classical music; HD4: Alternative rock
- Affiliations: National Public Radio; Public Radio Exchange; American Public Media; Pacifica Radio; BBC World Service

Ownership
- Owner: East Tennessee State University

History
- First air date: February 24, 1974
- Call sign meaning: East Tennessee State

Technical information
- Licensing authority: FCC
- Facility ID: 18253
- Class: C
- ERP: 66,000 watts
- HAAT: 692 meters (2,270 ft)

Links
- Public license information: Public file; LMS
- Webcast: Listen live; Listen live (HD2); Listen live (HD3)
- Website: www.wets.org

WETS-FM (89.5 FM) is a non-commercial radio station licensed to Johnson City, Tennessee, United States, and serving the Tri-Cities region of northeast Tennessee and southwest Virginia. Owned by East Tennessee State University, WETS-FM is an NPR member station with studios inside Richard F. Ellis Hall on the ETSU campus on Centennial Drive in Johnson City. WETS-FM receives a little over half of its funding from listener contributions; it also receives public funding from federal and government-funded university sources.

WETS-FM is a Class C station. It has an effective radiated power (ERP) of 66,000 watts. The transmitter is on Panhandle Road in Hunter, Tennessee, amid the towers for other Tri-Cities FM and TV stations.

== History ==
WETS signed on the air on February 24, 1974. The station has transmitted from a tower on Holston Mountain since 1981. It broadcasts from studios in Richard F. Ellis Hall. The hall was opened in 1988, dedicated to the station's first director in 1993. The studios are on the south side of ETSU's campus. Before 1988, it operated from a two-story frame house.

When WETS-FM began broadcasting, it mostly played music. But as with other public radio stations affiliated with NPR, it has gradually reduced music and increased news and informational programming. On February 1, 2010, WETS changed its weekday format to all news and talk shows. In its first decade, the station aired classical music on weekday mornings and evenings, with Americana music in the afternoons, and a weekly blues program known as Blue Monday. Most weekend programming, which still includes music, was not affected by this change.

In the fall of 2011, WETS began broadcasting using HD Radio technology. In addition to the main analog transmission, it has several HD digital subchannels. The first is a simulcast of the analog signal, the second is an all-Americana music channel, the third is an all-classical music channel. WETS was the first station in the Tri-Cities radio market to offer HD broadcasts. A fourth subchannel was added later, airing album adult alternative music. Most programming streams are also available on the website.

As an annual fundraiser, the station presents the Little Chicago Blues Festival at the Down Home Festival each spring. WETS had been the home station of Your Weekly Constitutional, a constitutional law show distributed by the Public Radio Exchange and produced in collaboration with Montpelier.

== Programming ==
On weekdays, WETS has a news, talk and information format, and is one of a few NPR members to air Democracy Now!, which has proven to be controversial since the Tri-Cities is largely a politically and culturally conservative region. As such, the station lost a number of members who objected to the program. However, the show has attracted a base of local supporters, who have formed a "Democracy Now Tri-Cities" group dedicated to keeping the program on the air.

On weekends, the station carries entertainment programming, including Americana music, featuring local bands from southern Appalachia.
