= East Tennessee State University Arboretum =

Arboretum in Johnson City, Tennessee, USA

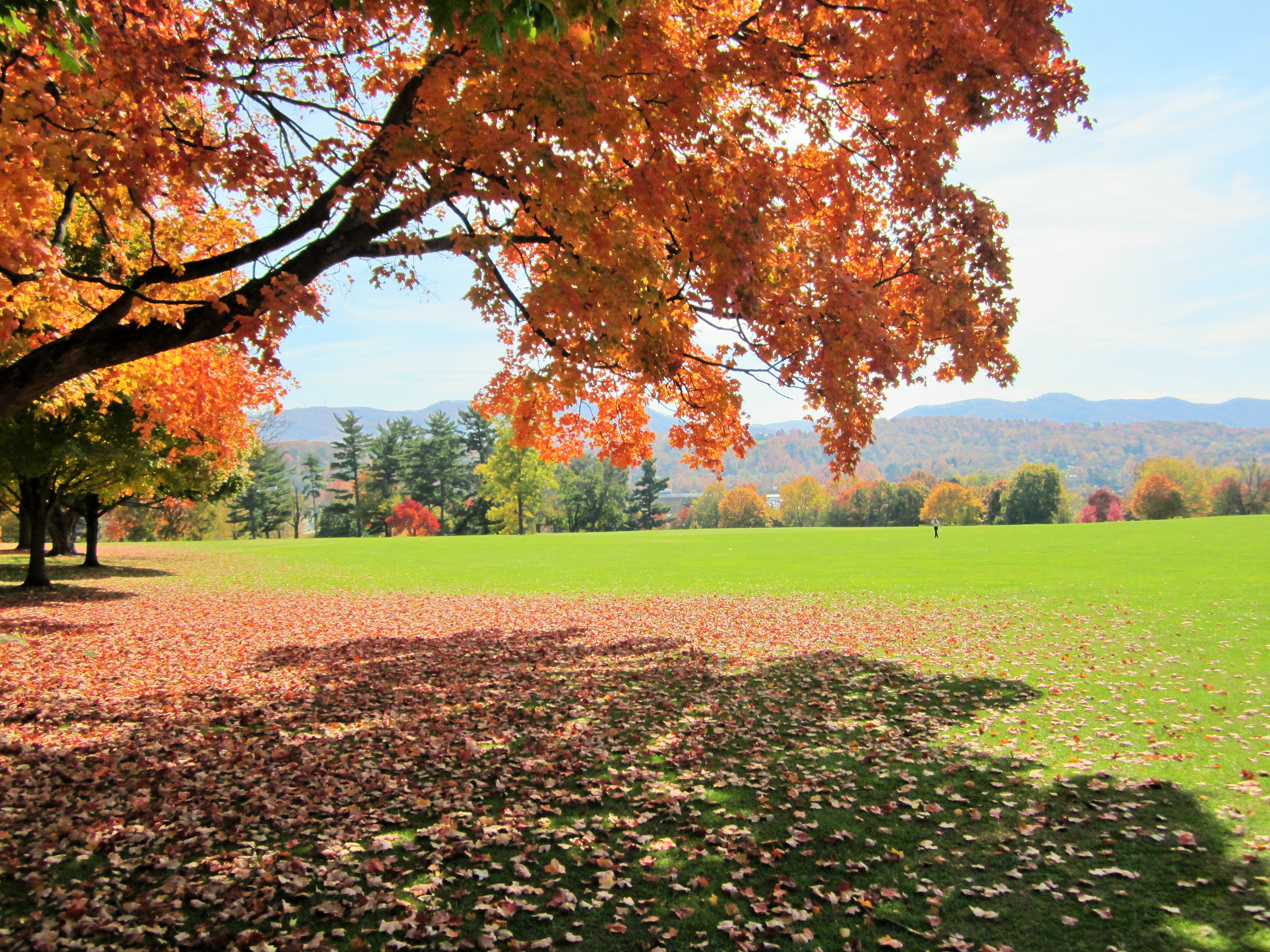
- Interactive map of East Tennessee State University Arboretum
- Type: Arboretum
- Location: East Tennessee State University
- Nearest city: Johnson City, Tennessee
- Coordinates: 36°18′17.42″N 82°22′0.95″W
- Created: 2002; 24 years ago
- Website: etsu.edu/arboretum

The East Tennessee State University Arboretum is an arboretum located across the East Tennessee State University campus, Johnson City, Tennessee.

The arboretum was formally established in 2002, and currently includes nearly 200 labeled tree species.

== See also ==
- List of botanical gardens in the United States
