= John Alan Maxwell =

- Born: John Alan Maxwell; March 7, 1904; Roanoke, VA
- Died: April 13, 1984 (aged 80); Johnson City, TN
- Education: Corcoran School, Art Students League
- Known for: historical paintings and illustration
- Notable work: illustrations for Pearl Buck, Edna Ferber, John Steinbeck, Hervey Allen, Sir Arthur Conan Doyle, Christopher Morley, Aldous Huxley
- Movement: romantic realism
- Awards: Society of Illustrators Top Ten in the United States, 1936

John Alan Maxwell (March 7, 1904 – April 13, 1984) was an American artist known primarily for his book and magazine illustrations, as well as historical paintings. He also was an illustrator for many commercial publications, including Collier's Weekly, The Saturday Evening Post, The Golden Book Magazine, The American Magazine, and Woman's Home Companion.

== Early years and education ==
Maxwell was born in Roanoke, Virginia and raised in Johnson City, Tennessee, at 428 1/2 West Locust Street, the son of Arthur Clifford Maxwell and Bessie Mae (Ball) Maxwell. He was the oldest of five children, including Elizabeth Victoria Maxwell (Smedberg), Clifford Arthur Maxwell, Gladys Virginia Maxwell (McDaniel), and Julia Reeve Maxwell (Croasdell). He first married Stella Freeman. This marriage ended in the mid-1950s. He married Michele O'Hara in the 1960s.

Maxwell worked as a soda jerk in a drug store while attending Science Hill High School in Johnson City. At 16, he enrolled at the Corcoran School of Art in Washington, D.C. He continued his studies at the Art Students League of New York, where he studied under painter George Luks, a member of the Ashcan School of early twentieth-century American artists who often painted pictures of New York city life. One of his other teachers was noted book and magazine illustrator Frank Vincent DuMond, whose students also included Georgia O'Keeffe and Norman Rockwell.

== Artistic career ==
By 1925, at the age of 21, Maxwell was illustrating for Collier's and Golden Book magazines and had established a studio at the famous Tenth Street Studio Building. at 51 West Tenth Street in New York, home to "artist entrepreneurs" for 98 years —artists from the Hudson River School to the American Impressionists — including such famous artists as Frederick E. Church, Albert Bierstadt, Winslow Homer, Sanford R. Gifford, John La Farge and William Merritt Chase. The previous occupant of Maxwell's studio was the Lebanese artist, poet, and writer Kahlil Gibran.

By the early 1930s, Maxwell was illustrating for such noted writers as Christopher Morley, Sir Arthur Conan Doyle, Pearl S. Buck and Edna Ferber.

His illustrations for Aldous Huxley's first novel, Sir Hercules and Lady Filomena, appeared in the April, 1931 issue of Golden Book magazine, the same year Huxley was writing Brave New World. His erotic drawings enhance Le Sage's Asmodeus, or The Devil on Two Sticks published in 1932 by the Bibliophilist Society.

In 1936, according to his 1984 obituary in the Johnson City Press Chronicle, he won first place in the Society of Illustrators competition in New York—and was named one of the top 10 illustrators in the country. A prolific illustrator, other authors for whom he illustrated include John Steinbeck, Joseph Conrad, F. Van Wyck Mason, Allan Eckert, Frank Yerby, James Street, Booth Tarkington, Frank Slaughter, and Thomas Costain. He maintained his studio at the Tenth Street Studio until it was demolished in 1956. Maxwell returned to Johnson City shortly thereafter, and continued to work at his studio at 428 West Locust Street until his death in 1984.

An illustration signed by Maxwell for the official theater poster for Ernest Hemingway's 1943 film For Whom the Bell Tolls, was sold on eBay in March, 2011.

== Significance ==
While distinctions between artists and illustrators have not always favored the quiet work of the 20th century book and magazine illustrator, John Alan Maxwell was named one of the top ten illustrators in the country in 1936 by the Society of Illustrators in New York. He was described in a 1947 profile in American Artist magazine as the quintessential "illustrator of romance".

Maxwell illustrated multiple books and magazine serials for Pearl S. Buck for over a decade, including the portrait of the author's mother for the cover of the 1935 book, The Exile, and the companion portrait of her father for the cover of her 1936 book, Fighting Angel in addition to his illustrations of the serialized editions of these two books in Woman's Home Companion from 1935 to 1937. Mrs. Buck was the first American woman to be awarded both the Pulitzer Prize (1932) and Nobel Prize (1938) for literature, and these book illustrations are encased along with Buck's Nobel Prize in a glass case at the Green Hills Farm in Perkasie, Pennsylvania.

For the Doubleday Doran & Company, Maxwell illustrated a 1929 United States edition of The Adventures of the Scarlet Pimpernel by Baroness Emmuska Orczy, the British novelist, playwright and artist.

In a profile of Maxwell in the February, 1948 issue of Esquire Magazine, writer Robert U. Godsoe described the artist:

Here is a romantic painter of dangerously exciting women--women with 'great mystery in their hair and moisture on their hands.'

John Alan Maxwell, one of today's brightest lights in the illustrating field, yearns for times past, places forgotten, a world most imaginary, popularly supposed to have been pre-Civil War Dixie. The urge is a charming, if sometimes macabre nostalgia.

That Maxwell should spend his efforts upon a romanticized, literary past is no less legitimate than the preoccupation of a Chirico with long sad vistas in towns that never were. Maxwell is entitled to his moon-drenched graveyards as Poe was to his misty mid-regions. The only question we are permitted to ask is, "How far can nostalgia go without becoming the mutterings of an old man in his beer (or his bourbon) who likes to tell you, ad infinitum, about things that have ceased to interest anyone but himself, and himself only because he has nothing better to do?" What we are attempting to say to John Maxwell, then, his neighbor Tom Wolfe said to him and to Faulkner and to all the many talents of the modern South. Because you can't ever, really, try as you will, go home again.

Maxwell, when he loosens the shackles which have married him to the past, has a chance of becoming the painter of the most dangerous nudes in America, as Maillol's nudes are dangerous, because there is, in his concept of the female form, adoration, veneration, desire, the wit of well-being, the promise of enrichment.

In this day of Mondrian's fiendish austerity, of Moholoy-Nagy's sometimes bleakly scientific functionalism, of Kandinsky's astral trapezoids, there is a place in art for sheer romance, for flesh over honest bones, for mysteries in hair, for odor and sound.

Maxwell was a contemporary of N.C. Wyeth, an important 20th century illustrator. Maxwell and Wyeth each illustrated five novels for Rafael Sabatini. Wyeth and Maxwell also both illustrated works for C. S. Forester's popular Horatio Hornblower series. Maxwell illustrated the dust jacket for the 1933 first edition of Hervey Allen's Anthony Adverse, followed by Wyeth's illustration of a 1934 edition of the same book. Both editions featured interior decorations by Allan McNab. Maxwell's 1933 dust jacket illustration re-appears as an embossed duotone on a bookbound edition of Anthony Adverse in 1936. This same illustration also appears on a 1933 wooden Arteno "Picture Puzzle" in full color. Wyeth and Maxwell both illustrated books for Charles Nordhoff and James Norman Hall, the authors of Mutiny on the Bounty (Wyeth) and No More Gas (Maxwell). No More Gas originally appeared in the Saturday Evening Post in 1939 as Out of Gas. Today, Maxwell's original illustrations also adorn recent reprint editions of Allan Eckert's novels, including The Frontiersmen, Wilderness Empire and The Conquerors. Maxwell was still illustrating books for Eckert when he died in 1984.

== Partial List of Maxwell's works ==
- Hopper, James Marie, 1876-1956 Medals of honor, with illustrations by John Alan Maxwell
- Interior Artwork; Colliers Aug 13 '27 Loot • Albert Payson Terhune • ss; illus. John Alan Maxwell
- Interior Artwork; The Golden Book Magazine Apr '30
- The Flight to Varennes Part 2 of 4 • Alexandre Dumas; trans. by Richard S. Garnett • sl, 1930; illus. John Alan Maxwell
- Interior Artwork; The Golden Book Magazine Nov '30
- Mary, Queen of Scots • Charles Augustin Sainte-Beuve • bg (r); illus. John Alan Maxwell
- Cover Artist; The Golden Book Magazine Jul '35 Golden Book Magazine [v22 #127, July 1935] (Review of Reviews, 25¢, 128pp, small pulp, cover by John Alan Maxwell); Reprint magazine. [PSP]
- Cover Artist; The Golden Book Magazine Aug '35 Golden Book Magazine [v22 #128, August 1935] (Review of Reviews, 25¢, 128pp, small pulp, cover by John Alan Maxwell); Partial contents from EBAY auction.
- Interior Artwork; Ladies Home Journal Oct '36 Fair Day • Ruth Burr Sanborn • ss; illus. John Alan Maxwell
- Interior Artwork; Colliers Aug 1 '42 The Baltimore Burnt-Eyes • Herbert Ravenel Sass • ss; illus. John Alan Maxwell
- Interior Artwork; The Country Gentleman Oct '42 Biography • Will F. Jenkins • ss; illus. John Alan Maxwell
- Interior Artwork; Woman's Home Companion Sep '44 A Curse on Thee, Cordelia • Helen Strass • ss; illus. John Alan Maxwell
- Interior Artwork; Woman's Home Companion Aug '45 A Pair of Wings • Edita Morris • ss; illus. John Alan Maxwell
- Interior Artwork; The American Magazine Jan '48 Flight into Spring • Bianca Bradbury • ss; illus. John Alan Maxwell
- Collier's Magazine December 10, 1927 Edgar Ain't With It a short story by Ernest Poole. Illustrated by John Alan Maxwell.
- Collier's Magazine December 24, 1927 A Way With Women a short story by John B. Kennedy with illustrations by John Alan Maxwell
- Garden City, N.Y., Doubleday, 1957. The gentleman from Indianapolis; a treasury of Booth Tarkington, edited by John Beecroft. Illustrated by John Alan Maxwell

== Film ==
The Lovelies of John Alan Maxwell, a film based on Maxwell's years in New York, premiered February 23, 2013 at the Bijou Theatre in Knoxville, Tennessee. The film was written, directed, and produced by Maxwell's great nephew, Douglas Stuart McDaniel.

== Exhibitions ==
"John Alan Maxwell: Illustrator of Romance" Exhibition of works by Maxwell at the Carroll Reece Museum. January–April, 2009. Exhibition included works Maxwell illustrated for Steinbeck, Tarkington, Buck, Conan Doyle, curated by Douglas Stuart McDaniel and Reece Museum staff

"The Lovelies of John Alan Maxwell" Exhibition of works by Maxwell at the Carroll Reece Museum. April–July 2014. Artist John Alan Maxwell was known for his classical book and magazine illustrations for authors such as Pearl Buck, John Steinbeck and Ernest Hemingway. This exhibit examines Maxwell's under appreciated mastery of the human form. Esquire Magazine once described Maxwell's portrayals of nudes as "dangerous". Included in the exhibition is an ongoing screening of the documentary film, The Lovelies of John Alan Maxwell. Curated by Douglas Stuart McDaniel and Reece Museum staff ArtFacts
