= Van Williams (American football) =

American football player (born 1959)

No. 23, 35
- Position: Running back

Personal information
- Born: March 15, 1959 (age 67); Johnson City, Tennessee, U.S.
- Listed height: 6 ft 0 in (1.83 m)
- Listed weight: 208 lb (94 kg)

Career information
- High school: Science Hill (Johnson City)
- College: East Tennessee State; Carson–Newman
- NFL draft: 1982: 4th round, 93rd overall pick

Career history
- Buffalo Bills (1982–1985); New York Giants (1987)

Career NFL statistics
- Rushing yards: 170
- Rushing average: 3.4
- Total touchdowns: 1
- Stats at Pro Football Reference

George Van Williams (born March 15, 1959) is an American former professional football player who was a running back in the National Football League (NFL) for the Buffalo Bills and the New York Giants. He played college football for the East Tennessee State Buccaneers and Carson–Newman Eagles and was selected 93rd overall in the fourth round of the 1982 NFL draft. He graduated from Science Hill High School in Johnson City, Tennessee.
