= James H. Quillen College of Medicine =

Public medical school in Johnson City, Tennessee, US

Coordinates: 36°18′N 82°22′W

- QCOM emblem
- Motto: Chances are we've touched your life.
- Type: Public university
- Established: 1974
- Parent institution: East Tennessee State University
- President: Brian Noland Ph.D
- Dean: Dr. Bill Block, M.D.
- Faculty: 208
- Students: 278
- Location: Mountain Home, Tennessee, U.S.
- Campus: Suburban
- Website: www.etsu.edu/com/
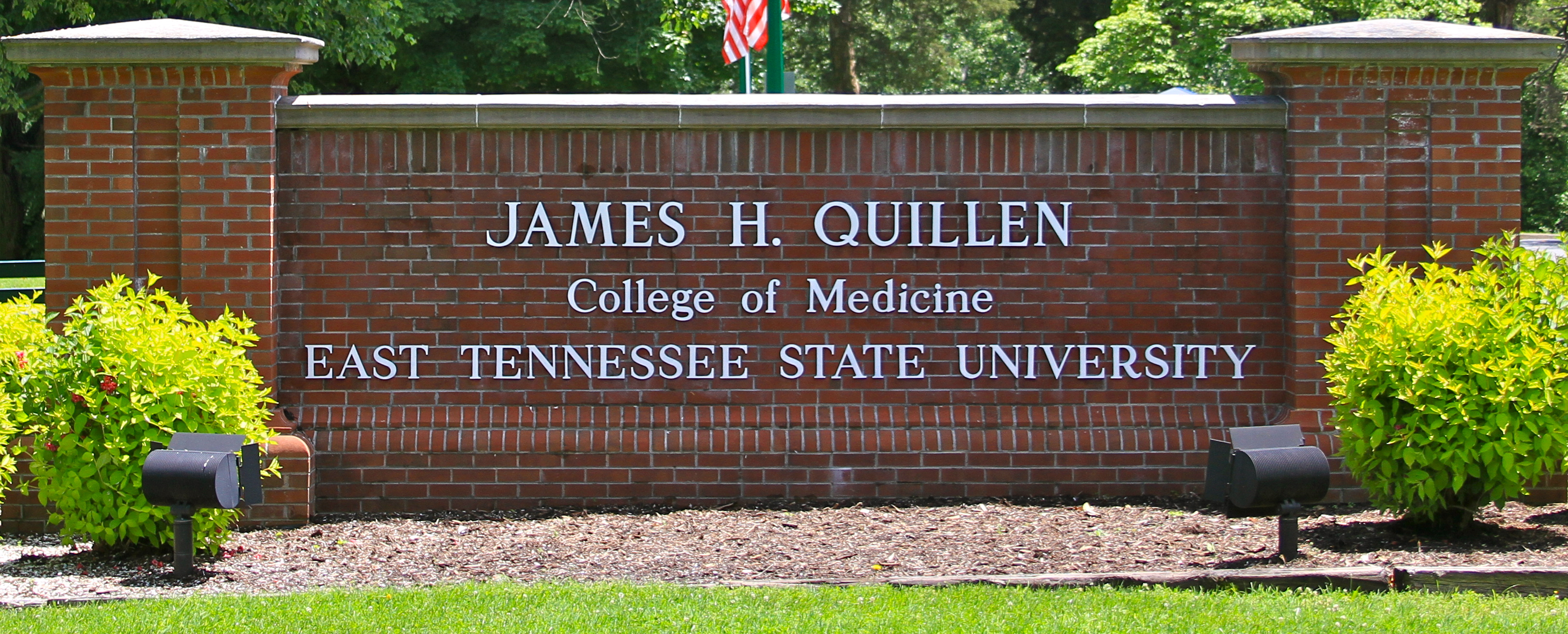
- Entrance

The James H. Quillen College of Medicine is a medical school located on the campus of East Tennessee State University in Johnson City, Tennessee, United States. It is one of two public medical schools in Tennessee, the other being the University of Tennessee College of Medicine at the University of Tennessee Health Science Center in Memphis.

It was named for Congressman Jimmy Quillen, who led the fight to open a second public medical school in Tennessee. The school was originally named the ETSU Quillen-Dishner College of Medicine, but Dr. Paul Dishner's name was removed in 1989.

In the 2011 edition of U.S. News & World Report's "America's Best Graduate Schools," the James H. Quillen College of Medicine at East Tennessee State University is ranked sixth in the nation for excellence in rural medicine education. For several consecutive years, ETSU has been ranked within the top 10 schools in the country for rural medicine. Additionally, Quillen College of Medicine at East Tennessee State University was recognized in the 2011 edition of U.S. News & World Report's "America's Best Graduate Schools" for ranking 20th in the nation for family medicine education. Quillen has also been recognized by the American Academy of Family Physicians as one of the top 10 schools in the nation for producing family physicians. ETSU was also ranked in the top 25% of medical schools for primary care education by U.S. News & World Report.

A study published in the June 15, 2010 edition of Annals of Internal Medicine by a professor of health policy, Fitzhugh Mullan, ranked East Tennessee State University's James H. Quillen College of Medicine as the top school in the nation for producing primary care physicians and 12th among U.S. medical schools on a “social mission” scale.

== Facilities ==
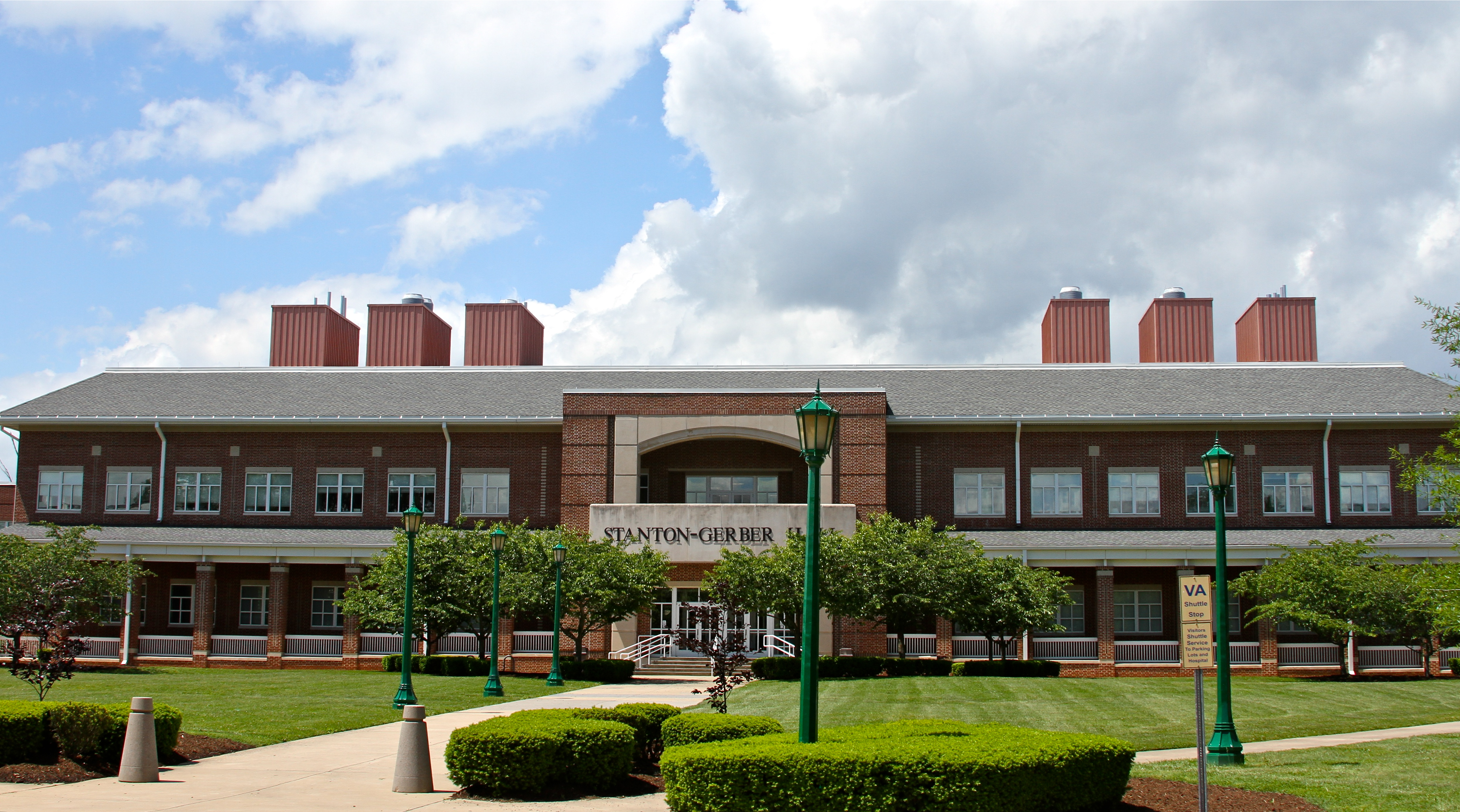
Stanton-Gerber Hall

Affiliated Hospitals

- Bristol Regional Medical Center in Bristol
- James H. Quillen Veterans Affairs Medical Center
- Johnson City Medical Center
- Woodridge Hospital
- Holston Valley Medical Center in Kingsport

Rural Primary Care Training Sites:

- Hawkins County Hospital in Rogersville
- Johnson County Health Center in Mountain City

== History ==
In 1968, Dr. D.P. Culp was appointed president of ETSU, and his stated major goal was to establish a medical school. Other early supporters included U.S. representative Jimmy Quillen, State Representative P.L. Robinson, ETSU Dean of Health John Lamb, Johnson City attorney Mark Hicks, then Speaker of the House Ned McWherter, newspaper publisher Carl Jones, State Senator Marshall Nave, State Representative Gwen Fleming, Johnson City Physician Charles Ed Allen, and State Representative Bob Good.

A 1971 study by the Tennessee Higher Education Commission concluded that it was not cost effective to have a medical school in Northeast Tennessee. This study was supported by the Tennessee Board of Regents. Shortly afterward, a new process for starting the school became available.

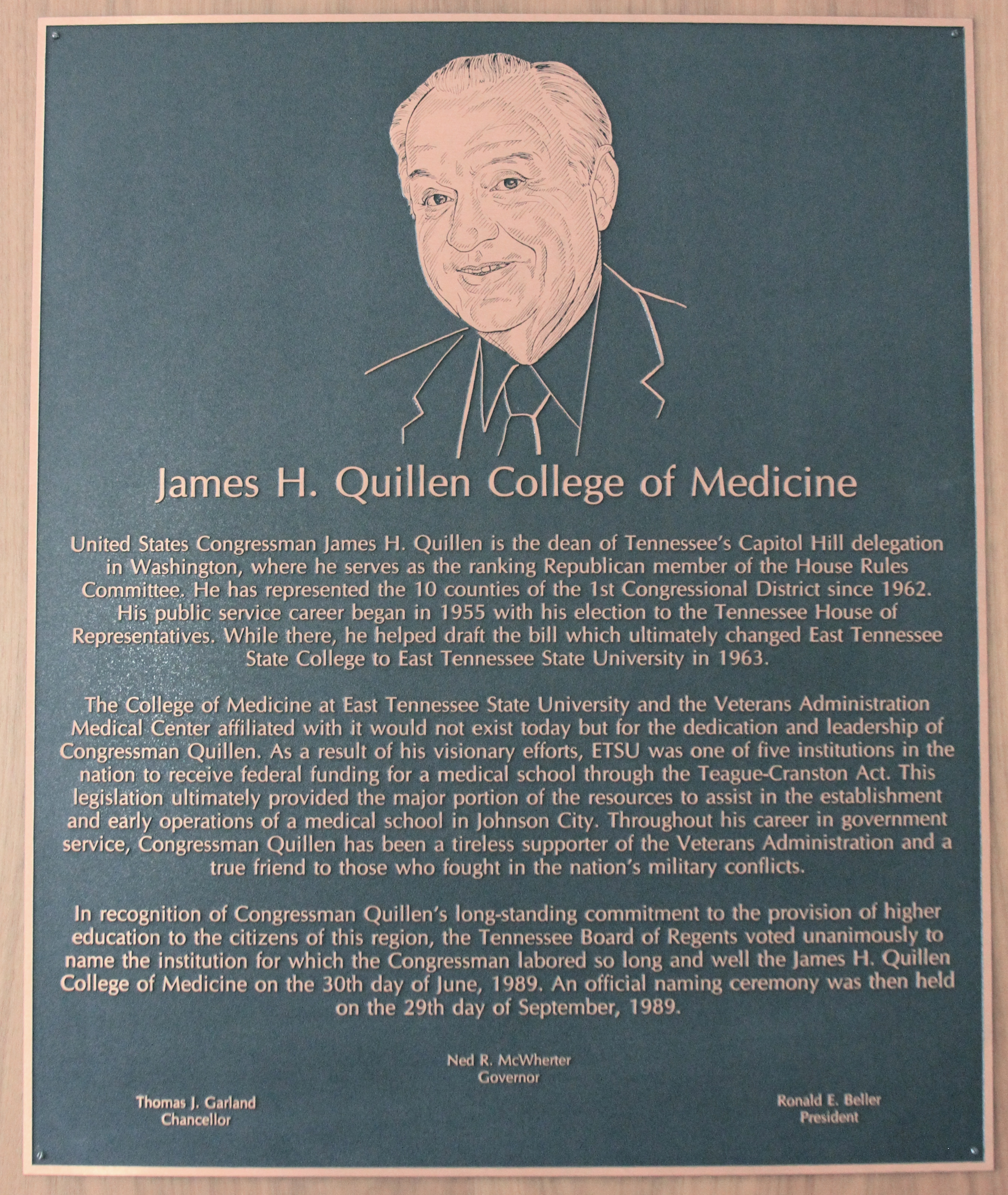
Jimmy Quillen

In April 1971, U.S. Congressman Olin Teague of Texas introduced a bill to create five medical schools in conjunction with established VA hospitals. Senator Alan Cranston of California introduced a companion bill. Known as the Teague-Cranston Act, the proposal called for the creation of five new medical schools in five states to meet the needs of the medically underserved areas of the country. Congressman Quillen claimed to have introduced an amendment, which required that any university to be considered for acceptance into this pilot program must be on government property contiguous and adjacent to a VA hospital, as East Tennessee State University was adjacent to the Mountain Home VA Hospital. The bill passed without a dissenting vote in October 1972, and was signed by President Richard Nixon. The act, as passed, required that the new schools be "located in proximity to, and operated in conjunction with, Veterans' Administration medical facilities." In Tennessee, Senator Nave called for consideration of legislation to establish a medical school at ETSU in the Senate on February 14, 1974 which was approved. Four days later, the bill failed to pass in the House. Representatives Robinson and Good used their political influence, and the measure was passed on second attempt on February 28. The bill was presented to Governor Winfield Dunn of Memphis, who vetoed it as expected. Motions to override the veto were made by Senator Nave and Representative Robinson in their respective houses. The Senate overrode with an 18–13 vote on March 6, and the House followed suit on March 12, 1974.

The next step was qualifying for the federal funds under the Teague-Cranston Act, with Quillen working with the State Board of Regents Chancellor Roy Nicks and President Culp on the application, which was approved by the Veterans Administration on July 11, 1974. On June 30, 1977, Dr. Culp's last day in office as the President of ETSU, the Liaison Committee on Medical Education issued a letter of reasonable assurance that the new medical school would be accredited. The first class of 24 students (out of 255 applicants) enrolled in September 1978. Full accreditation was granted when that first class graduated in 1982.

The political fight for the school continued to reverberate through Tennessee politics. Quillen never forgave former Republican governor Winfield Dunn for his opposition, and when Dunn ran for a second term in 1986, Quillen saw that Dunn's Republican support in East Tennessee was weak. Democrat Ned McWherter then won the election by a large margin.

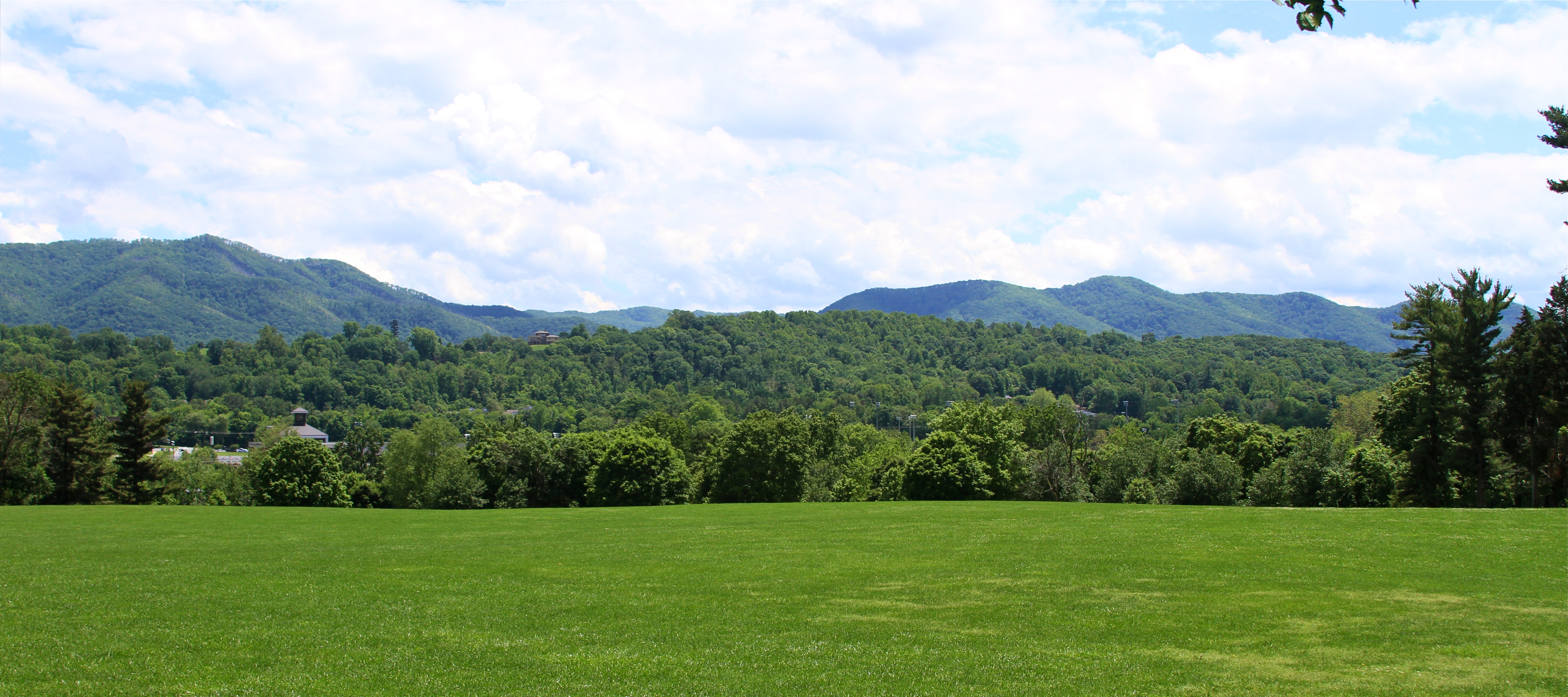
Main lawn of the Mountain Home VA campus
