= Steven James =

American novelist (born 1969)

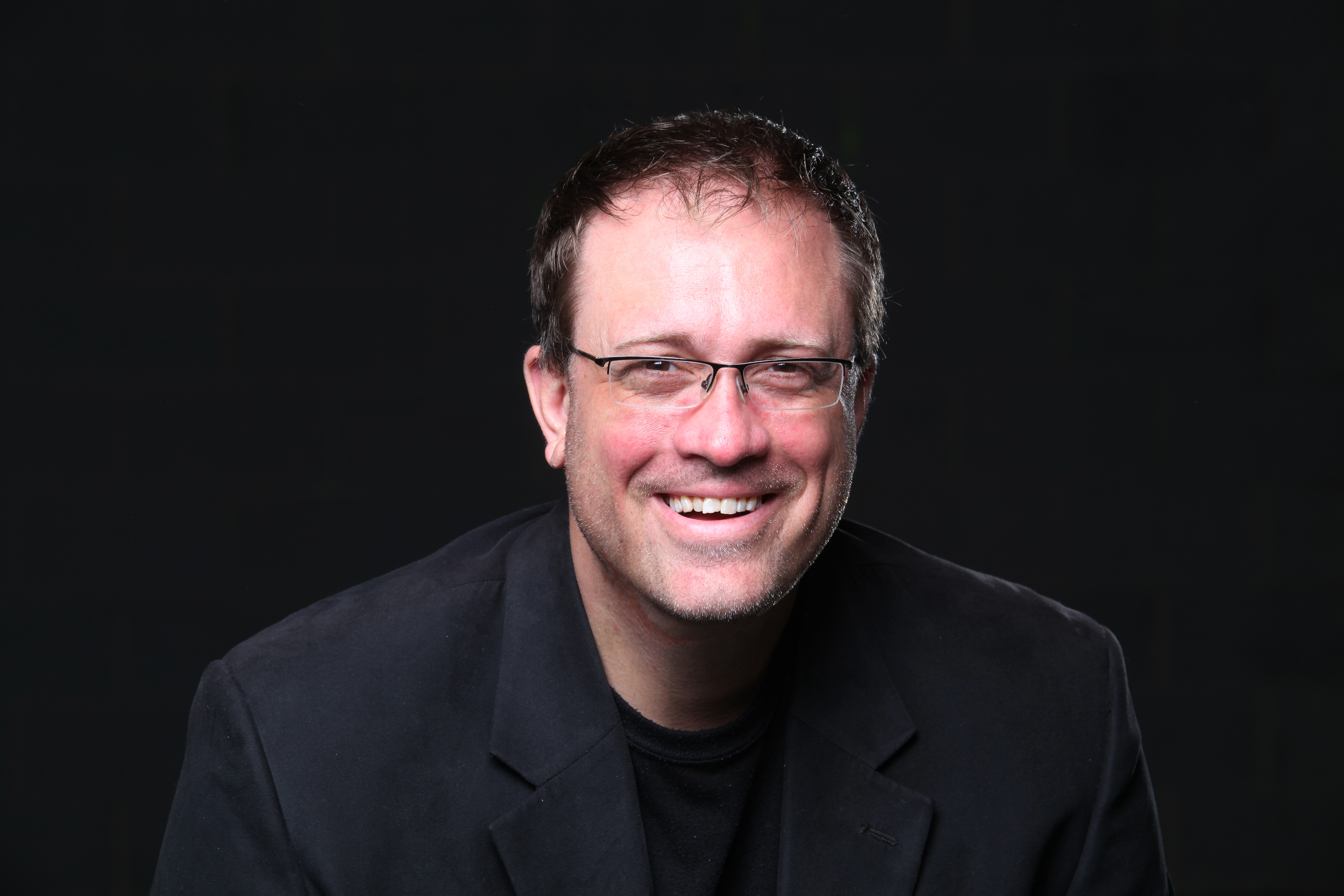
- Born: 1969 (age 56–57); Wisconsin, U.S.
- Education: East Tennessee State University (MA)
- Occupation: Author
- Children: 3
- Writing career
- Years active: 2000s–present
- Genres: Suspense fiction, Psychological thriller
- Notable work: The Bowers Files
- Website: stevenjames.net

Steven James (born 1969) is an American author who has written more than forty books, including the critically acclaimed Bowers Files, an eleven-book series of psychological thrillers that consists of Opening Moves, Every Crooked Path, Every Deadly Kiss, Every Wicked Man, The Pawn, The Rook, The Knight, The Bishop, The Queen, The King, and Checkmate. The series has received four Christy Awards and numerous other honors.

His standalone book, Synapse, a standalone sci-fi thriller, released on October 8, 2019. The book received a Publishers Weekly starred review in July 2019 and a Library Journal starred review in October 2019. His latest nonfiction, The Art of the Tale, co-written with Fortune 50 speechwriter Tom Morrisey, released on August 30, 2022 through HarperCollins Leadership. Broker of Lies, his latest fiction novel, was released in April 2023.

== Personal life ==
Steven James was born in Wisconsin in 1969 and earned his M.A. in Storytelling at East Tennessee State University in 1997. He lives with his wife and three daughters in the foothills of the Smoky Mountains of eastern Tennessee.

== The Bowers Files ==
Steven James' most famous works to date form the psychological thriller series The Bowers Files. Each book delves into the life of Patrick Bowers, an Environmental Criminologist. Although each book is its own standalone story, they all tie together at various points. The crimes are gruesome and sadistic but presented without verbal profanity. Romance is shown, but without graphic sexuality.

== Career ==
Steven James is a nationally bestselling author for his award-winning novels. Best known for his psychological thrillers, he has received honors and awards for his books, including four Christy Awards and the 2018 International Book Award for best Mystery/Suspense.

Suspense Magazine, who named James's book The Bishop their Book of the Year, says that he “sets the new standard in suspense writing.” Publishers Weekly calls him a “master storyteller at the peak of his game” and RT Book Reviews promises that “the nail-biting suspense will rivet you.”

Equipped with a master's degree in Storytelling, James has taught writing and storytelling on four continents over the past two decades, speaking more than two thousand times at events spanning the globe.

James's groundbreaking book on the craft of fiction, Story Trumps Structure: How to Write Unforgettable Fiction by Breaking the Rules, won a 2015 Storytelling World Award and was recognized as one of the year's best resources for storytellers; his latest book on writing, Troubleshooting Your Novel, also won a Storytelling World Award. Both books were published by Writer's Digest Books.

Widely recognized for his storycrafting expertise, James has served for a number of years as a Master CraftFest instructor at ThrillerFest, North America's premier training event for suspense writers hosted by International Thriller Writers. He also regularly teaches Novel Writing Intensive retreats across the country with renowned international bestselling author Robert Dugoni.

James's short fiction has appeared in numerous publications including The New York Times.

== Accolades ==
- 2020 entered into the Christy Award Hall of Fame
- 2019 Christy Award for Mystery/Suspense/Thriller (Every Wicked Man)
- 2018 International Book Award for best Mystery/Suspense (Every Wicked Man)
- 2018 Storytelling World Award (Troubleshooting Your Novel)
- 2015 Storytelling World Award (Story Trumps Structure)
- 2012 ECPA Book of the Year - Fiction (The Queen)
- 2012 Retailers Choice Awards Finalist (The Queen)
- 2012 Christy Award - Suspense (The Queen)
- 2012 International Thriller Award Finalist for Best Original Paperback (The Queen)
- 2011 Library Journal's One of the Best Christian Fiction Books (The Queen)
- 2011 Christy Award - Suspense (The Bishop)
- 2011 INSPY Award - Mystery/Thriller (The Bishop)
- 2011 INSPY Award - Thriller/Suspense (The Knight)
- 2010 Suspense Magazine Book of the Year (The Bishop)
- 2010 RT Book Reviews Best Inspirational Suspense (The Bishop)
- 2010 The Christian Manifesto's Lime Award (The Bishop)
- 2009 The Suspense Zone Book of the Month, November (The Knight)
- 2009 Suspense Magazine Top 10 Books of (The Knight)
- 2009 The Christian Manifesto's Lime Award – Best Fiction (The Knight)
- 2009 Christy Award - Suspense (The Rook)
- 2008 The Suspense Zone Reviewer's Choice Award (The Rook)
- 2008 Best Crime Thriller Christy Award, Finalist (The Pawn)
- 2007 A Peek At My Bookshelf (The Pawn)

== Bibliography ==
=== The Bowers Files ===
Title	Year	Publisher	ISBN	Notes
The Pawn	2007	Revell (Baker)	978-0451412799	
The Rook	2008	Revell (Baker)	978-0451412812	
The Knight	2009	Revell (Baker)	978-0800732707	
The Bishop	2010	Revell (Baker)	978-0800733025	
The Queen	2011	Revell (Baker)	978-0800733032	
Opening Moves	2012	Berkley (Penguin)	978-0451237767	Prequel
The King	2013	Berkley (Penguin)	978-0451239785	
Checkmate	2014	Berkley (Penguin)	978-0451467348	
Every Crooked Path	2015	Berkley (Penguin)	978-0451467355	Prequel
Every Deadly Kiss	2017	Berkley (Penguin)	978-1101991572	Prequel
Every Wicked Man	2018	Berkley (Penguin)	978-1101991596	Prequel

=== The Jevin Banks Experience ===
Title	Year	Publisher	ISBN	Notes
Placebo	2012	Revell (Baker)	978-0800734251	
Singularity	2013	Revell (Baker)	978-0800734268	

=== The Blur Trilogy ===
Title	Year	Publisher	ISBN	Notes
Blur	2014	Skyscape (Amazon)	978-1477847275	
Fury	2015	Skyscape (Amazon)	978-1477827468	
Curse	2016	Skyscape (Amazon)	978-1503933453	

=== Other fiction ===
Title	Year	Publisher	ISBN	Notes
Quest for Celestia: A Reimagining of The Pilgrim’s Progress	2012	Living Ink Books	978-0899578866	Originally published in 2006 by Thirsty
Synapse	2019	Thomas Nelson (HarperCollins)	978-0785225256	
Broker of Lies	2023	Tyndale House	978-1496473318	

=== Nonfiction ===
Title	Year	Publisher	Notes
The Art of the Tale	2022	HarperCollins	978-1400233113
Sailing Between the Stars: Musings on the Mysteries of Faith	2006	Revell (Baker)	
Never the Same: Stories of Those Who Encountered Jesus	2005	Zondervan/Youth Specialties	
Becoming Real: Christ’s Call to Authentic Living	2005	Simon & Schuster	
A Heart Exposed: Talking to God with Nothing to Hide	2009	Revell (Baker)	
Story: Recapture the Mystery	2006	Revell (Baker)	
How to Smell Like God: True Stories Burning with the Scent of Heaven	2002	Standard Publishing	Reprinted 2005
Praying from the Gut: An Honest Prayer Journal for Teens	2004	Standard Publishing	
Sharable Parables: Creative Storytelling Ideas for Ages 3–12	2005	Standard Publishing	Part of The Steven James Storytelling Library
The Creative Storytelling Guide for Children’s Ministry: When All Your Brain Wants to Do Is Fly!	2002	Standard Publishing	Part of The Steven James Storytelling Library
30 New Testament Interactive Stories for Young Children	2007	Standard Publishing	Part of The Steven James Storytelling Library
30 Old Testament QuickSkits for Kids	2004	Standard Publishing	Part of The Steven James Storytelling Library
30 New Testament QuickSkits for Kids	2004	Standard Publishing	Part of The Steven James Storytelling Library
Bible Story QuickSkits for 2 Kids	2008	Standard Publishing	Part of The Steven James Storytelling Library
Crazy and Creative Bible Stories for Preteens	2005	Standard Publishing	Part of The Steven James Storytelling Library
30 Old Testament Interactive Stories for Young Children	2007	Standard Publishing	Part of The Steven James Storytelling Library
Believe It!	2003	Standard Publishing	
Jawdroppers: 36 Shocking Stories for Students Based on the Sayings of Jesus	2001	Standard Publishing	
Drama for Real Life: 16 Scripts About Choices that Shape Us	2006	IVP Books	
Gather Round the Dinner Fable	2006	David C. Cook	
Worship Sketches 2 Perform	2000	Meriwether Publishing	
24 Tandem Bible hero Story Scripts for Children’s Ministry	2004	Standard Publishing	Part of The Steven James Storytelling Library
24 Tandem Bible Storyscripts for Children’s Ministry	2004	Standard Publishing	Part of The Steven James Storytelling Library
Astonishing Tales of Spiritual Truth: Gripping Stories Based on the Sayings of Jesus	2005	Standard Publishing	
More Worship Sketches 2 Perform	2002	Meriwether Publishing	
On the Edge: A Collection of 17 Hard-Hitting Christian Monologues for Youth	2004	Christian Publishers LLC	
Story Trumps Structure	2014	Writer's Digest Books	
Troubleshooting Your Novel	2016	Writer's Digest Books	
