= Johnson City, Tennessee =

Johnson City
- City
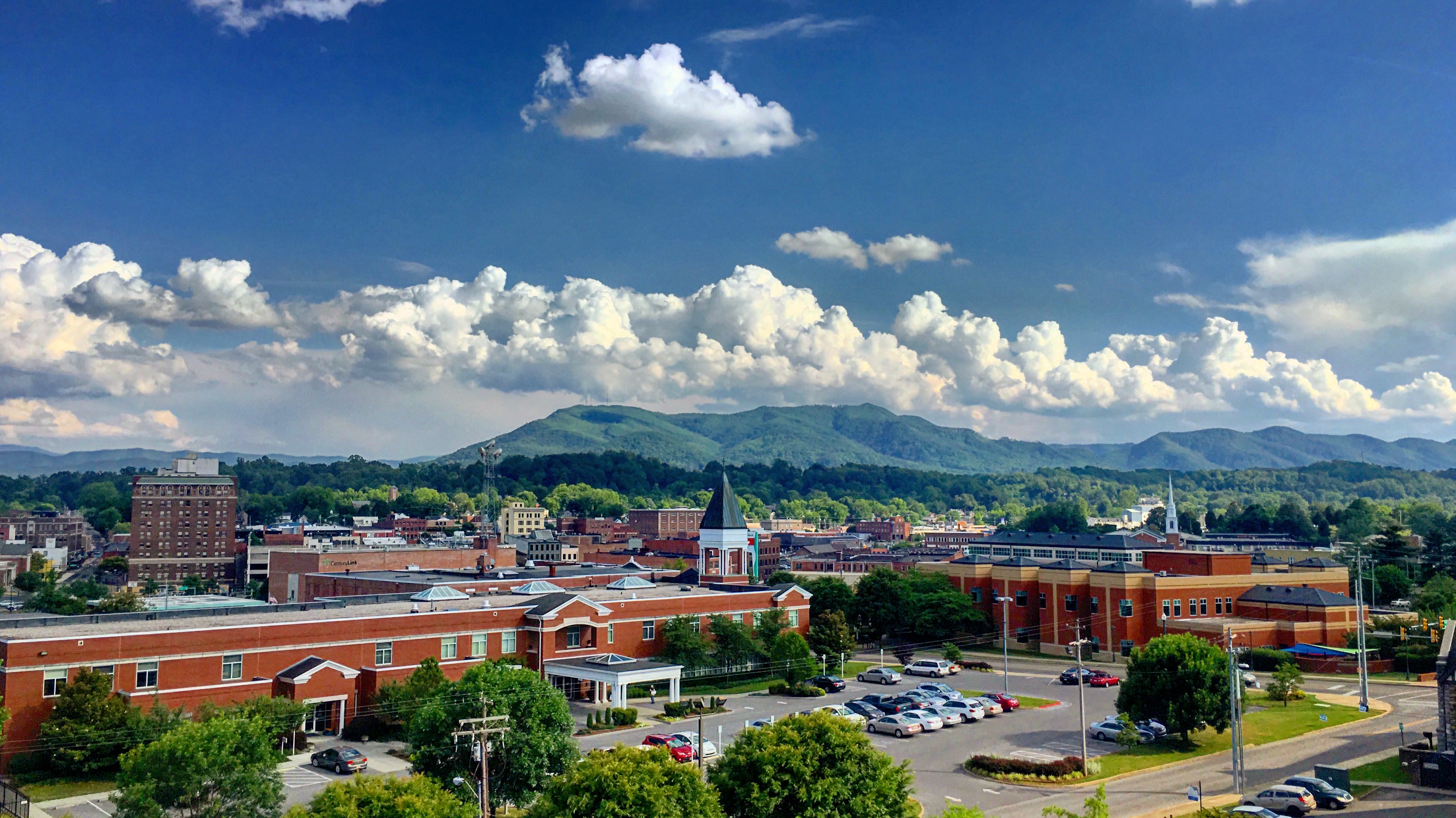
- Downtown Johnson City

- Flag Seal Logo
- Nickname: Little Chicago
- Motto: Go. All. Out.
- Location of Johnson City in Carter, Sullivan and Washington counties, Tennessee

- Location within Tennessee Location within the United States
- Coordinates: 36°20′N 82°22′W
- Country: United States
- State: Tennessee
- Counties: Washington, Carter, Sullivan
- Founded: 1856
- Incorporated: 1869
- Founder: Henry Johnson

Government
  - Type: Council-manager government
  - Mayor: Greg Cox
  - City Manager: Cathy Ball
  - City Commissioners: Jenny Brock; Joe Wise; Todd Fowler

Area
  - City: 43.75 sq mi (113.32 km^{2})
  - Land: 43.44 sq mi (112.52 km^{2})
  - Water: 0.31 sq mi (0.80 km^{2})
- Elevation: 1,634 ft (498 m)

Population (2020)
  - City: 71,046
  - Estimate (2025): 74,943
  - Rank: 8th in Tennessee
  - Density: 1,635.4/sq mi (631.42/km^{2})
  - Urban: 128,519 (US: 261st)
  - Metro: 207,285 (US: 215th)
  - CSA: 514,899 (US: 87th)
- Time zone: UTC−5 (Eastern (EST))
  - Summer (DST): UTC−4 (EDT)
- ZIP codes: 37601-37604, 37614, 37615 & 37684
- Area codes: 423 and 729
- FIPS code: 47-38320
- GNIS feature ID: 1328579
- Website: www.johnsoncitytn.org

Johnson City is a city in Washington, Carter, and Sullivan counties in the U.S. state of Tennessee, mostly in Washington County. Located in an Appalachian valley near the Boone Lake impoundment of the Watauga River, Johnson City is Tennessee's eighth-most populous city, with a population of 71,046 as of the 2020 Census. Johnson City is the largest city of the Johnson City Metropolitan Statistical Area, as well as the Tri-Cities (Tennessee-Virginia) region of Northeast Tennessee and Southwest Virginia, which contains Kingsport, Tennessee and Bristol, Tennessee and had a population of 585,041 at the 2020 Census.

Johnson City is the nearest city to the first permanent European-American settlement in present-day Tennessee, which was built in 1768 by William Bean. Johnson City was founded as Johnson Depot in 1856, and incorporated as Johnson City in 1869. Once a railroad boomtown, Johnson City is today a hub for medicine and education, as the home to East Tennessee State University, the largest university in Northeast Tennessee, as well as the headquarters of Ballad Health, the region's largest health system.

== History ==
William Bean, traditionally recognized as Tennessee's first white settler, built his cabin along Boone's Creek near Johnson City in 1769. In the 1780s, Colonel John Tipton established a farm (now the Tipton-Haynes State Historic Site) just outside what is now Johnson City. During the State of Franklin movement, Tipton was a leader of the loyalist faction, residents of the region who wanted to remain part of North Carolina rather than form a separate state. In February 1788, an armed engagement took place at Tipton's farm between Tipton and his men and the forces led by John Sevier, the leader of the Franklin faction.

Founded in 1856 by Henry Johnson as a railroad station called "Johnson's Depot", Johnson City became a major rail hub for the Southeast, as three railway lines crossed in the downtown area.

In the late 19th and early 20th centuries, Johnson City served as headquarters for the narrow gauge East Tennessee and Western North Carolina Railroad (the ET&WNC, nicknamed "Tweetsie") and the standard gauge Clinchfield Railroad. Both rail systems featured excursion trips through scenic portions of the Blue Ridge Mountains and were engineering marvels of railway construction. The Southern Railway (now Norfolk Southern) also passes through the city.

During the American Civil War, before it was formally incorporated in 1869, the town's name was briefly changed to "Haynesville" in honor of Confederate Senator Landon Carter Haynes.

Henry Johnson's name was quickly restored following the war, with Johnson elected as the city's first mayor on January 3, 1870. The town grew rapidly from 1870 until 1890 as railroad and mining interests flourished. But the national depression of 1893, which caused many railway failures (including the Charleston, Cincinnati and Chicago Railroad or "3-Cs", a predecessor of the Clinchfield), and resulting financial panic halted Johnson City's boom town momentum.

In 1901, the Mountain Branch of the National Home for Disabled Volunteer Soldiers (now the U.S. Veterans Affairs Medical Center and National Cemetery), Mountain Home, Tennessee was created by an act of Congress introduced by Walter P. Brownlow. Construction on this 450-acre (1.8 km^{2}) campus, which was designed to serve disabled Civil War veterans, was completed in 1903 at a cost of $3 million. Before the completion of this facility, the assessed value of the entire town was listed at $750,000. The East Tennessee State Normal School was authorized in 1911 and the new college campus directly across from the National Soldiers Home. Johnson City began growing rapidly and became Tennessee's fifth-largest city by 1930.

Together with neighboring Bristol, Johnson City was a hotbed for old-time music. It hosted Columbia Records recording sessions in 1928 known as the Johnson City Sessions. Native son "Fiddlin' Charlie" Bowman became a national recording star via these sessions. The Fountain Square area downtown featured a host of local and traveling street entertainers, including Blind Lemon Jefferson.

During the 1920s and the Prohibition era, Johnson City's ties to the bootlegging activity of the Appalachian Mountains earned the city the nickname of "Little Chicago". Stories persist that the town was one of several distribution centers for Chicago gang boss Al Capone during Prohibition. Capone had a well-organized distribution network within the southern United States for alcohol smuggling; it shipped his products from the mountain distillers to northern cities. Capone was, according to local lore, a part-time resident of Montrose Court, a luxury apartment complex now listed on the National Register of Historic Places.

For many years, the city had a municipal "privilege tax" on carnival shows, in an attempt to dissuade traveling circuses and other transient entertainment businesses from doing business in town. The use of drums by merchants to draw attention to their goods is prohibited. Title Six, Section 106 of the city's municipal code, the so-called "Barney Fife" ordinance, empowers the city's police force to draft into involuntary service as many of the town's citizens as necessary to aid police in making arrests and preventing or quelling riots, unlawful assemblies, or breaches of peace.

== Geography ==
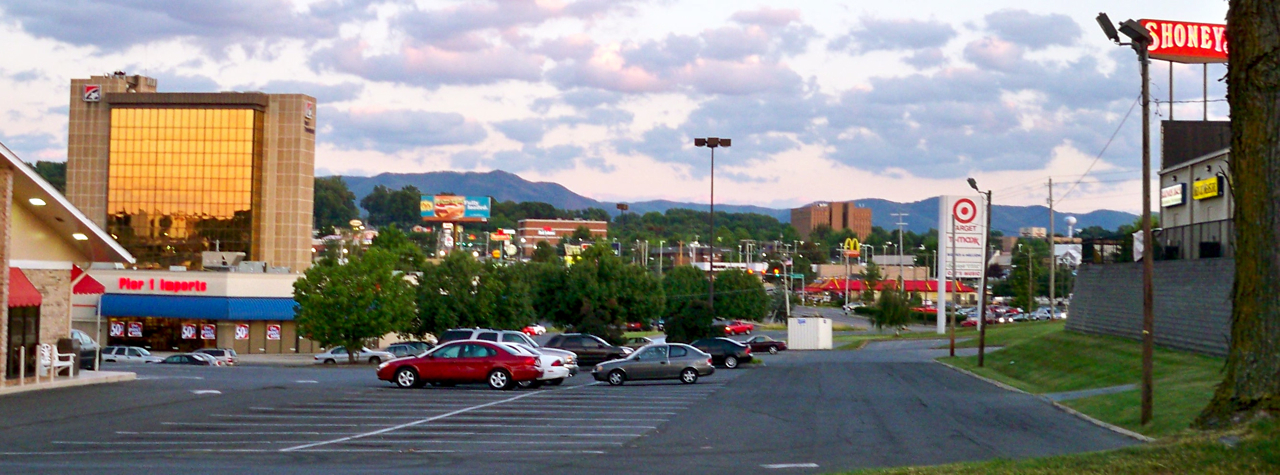
Midtown Johnson City

Johnson City is in northeastern Washington County, with smaller parts extending north into Sullivan County and east into Carter County. Johnson City shares a contiguous southeastern border with Elizabethton. Johnson City also shares a small contiguous border with Kingsport to the far north along I-26 and a slightly longer one with Bluff City to the northeast along US 11E.

According to the United States Census Bureau, the city has an area of 43.3 square miles (112.1 km^{2}), of which 42.9 square miles (111.2 km^{2}) is land and 0.3 square miles (0.8 km^{2}), or 0.75 percent, is water.

Buffalo Mountain, a ridge over 2,700 feet (820 m) high, is a city park on the south side of town. The Watauga River arm of Boone Lake, a Tennessee Valley Authority reservoir, is partly within the city limits.

=== Climate ===
Johnson City has a humid subtropical climate (Köppen Cfa), with warm summers and cool winters. Temperatures in Johnson City are moderated somewhat by its elevation and proximity to the Appalachian Mountains. Precipitation is abundant, with an average of 45.22 in (1,149 mm). Summer is typically the wettest part of the year, while early autumn is considerably drier. Snowfall is moderate and sporadic, with an average of 15.6 in (40 cm).

Climate data for Johnson City, Tennessee
| Month | Jan | Feb | Mar | Apr | May | Jun | Jul | Aug | Sep | Oct | Nov | Dec | Year |
|---|---|---|---|---|---|---|---|---|---|---|---|---|---|
| Record high °F (°C) | 78 (26) | 80 (27) | 83 (28) | 89 (32) | 94 (34) | 102 (39) | 99 (37) | 99 (37) | 97 (36) | 90 (32) | 84 (29) | 76 (24) | 102 (39) |
| Mean daily maximum °F (°C) | 45 (7) | 50 (10) | 59 (15) | 68 (20) | 76 (24) | 83 (28) | 86 (30) | 85 (29) | 79 (26) | 69 (21) | 59 (15) | 48 (9) | 67 (19) |
| Mean daily minimum °F (°C) | 25 (−4) | 28 (−2) | 34 (1) | 42 (6) | 51 (11) | 60 (16) | 64 (18) | 63 (17) | 55 (13) | 44 (7) | 35 (2) | 28 (−2) | 44 (7) |
| Record low °F (°C) | −21 (−29) | −12 (−24) | −1 (−18) | 20 (−7) | 28 (−2) | 39 (4) | 46 (8) | 36 (2) | 34 (1) | 22 (−6) | 11 (−12) | −9 (−23) | −21 (−29) |
| Average precipitation inches (mm) | 3.42 (87) | 3.69 (94) | 3.59 (91) | 3.50 (89) | 4.44 (113) | 4.56 (116) | 5.44 (138) | 4.15 (105) | 3.03 (77) | 2.44 (62) | 3.34 (85) | 3.62 (92) | 45.22 (1,149) |
| Average snowfall inches (cm) | 5.2 (13) | 4.2 (11) | 2.3 (5.8) | 0.4 (1.0) | 0 (0) | 0 (0) | 0 (0) | 0 (0) | 0 (0) | 0 (0) | 0.9 (2.3) | 2.6 (6.6) | 15.6 (40) |
| Average relative humidity (%) | 59.0 | 71.5 | 69.0 | 67.0 | 69.5 | 73.0 | 75.0 | 76.5 | 76.5 | 74.0 | 68.5 | 69.5 | 74.0 |
Source 1:
Source 2:

== Demographics ==
Historical population
| Census | Pop. | Note | %± |
|---|---|---|---|
| 1880 | 685 | | — |
| 1890 | 4,161 | | 507.4% |
| 1900 | 4,645 | | 11.6% |
| 1910 | 8,502 | | 83.0% |
| 1920 | 12,442 | | 46.3% |
| 1930 | 25,080 | | 101.6% |
| 1940 | 25,332 | | 1.0% |
| 1950 | 27,864 | | 10.0% |
| 1960 | 31,187 | | 11.9% |
| 1970 | 33,770 | | 8.3% |
| 1980 | 39,753 | | 17.7% |
| 1990 | 49,381 | | 24.2% |
| 2000 | 55,469 | | 12.3% |
| 2010 | 63,152 | | 13.9% |
| 2020 | 71,046 | | 12.5% |
| 2025 (est.) | 74,943 | | 5.5% |

=== 2020 census ===
As of the 2020 census, there were 71,046 people and 15,904 families residing in the city. The median age was 36.0 years; 18.9% of residents were under the age of 18 and 17.3% of residents were 65 years of age or older. For every 100 females there were 91.8 males, and for every 100 females age 18 and over there were 89.3 males age 18 and over.

99.0% of residents lived in urban areas, while 1.0% lived in rural areas.

Of the 29,957 households, 24.4% had children under the age of 18 living in them. Married-couple households made up 36.7%, while households with a male householder and no spouse or partner present accounted for 22.8% and households with a female householder and no spouse or partner present accounted for 33.1%. Approximately 36.3% of all households were made up of individuals and 12.9% had someone living alone who was 65 years of age or older. There were 32,801 housing units, of which 8.7% were vacant; the homeowner vacancy rate was 1.9% and the rental vacancy rate was 7.7%.

Racial composition as of the 2020 census
| Race | Number | Percent |
|---|---|---|
| White | 56,911 | 80.1% |
| Black or African American | 4,909 | 6.9% |
| American Indian and Alaska Native | 287 | 0.4% |
| Asian | 1,727 | 2.4% |
| Native Hawaiian and Other Pacific Islander | 45 | 0.1% |
| Some other race | 2,054 | 2.9% |
| Two or more races | 5,113 | 7.2% |
| Hispanic or Latino (of any race) | 4,498 | 6.3% |

=== 2000 census ===
As of the census of 2000, there was a population of 55,469, with 23,720 households and 14,018 families residing in the city. The population density was 1,412.4 per square mile. There were 25,730 housing units at an average density of 655.1 units per square mile (252.9 units/km^{2}). The racial makeup of the city was 90.09 percent white, 6.40 percent African American, 0.26% Native American, 1.22 percent Asian, 0.02 percent Pacific Islander, 0.69 percent from other races, and 1.32 percent from two or more races. Hispanic or Latino people of any race were 1.89 percent of the population.

There were 23,720 households, out of which 25.0 percent had children under the age of 18 living with them, 44.1 percent were married couples living together, 11.6 percent had a female householder with no husband present, and 40.9 percent were non-families. 33.9 percent of all households were made up of individuals, and 11.5 percent had someone living alone who was 65 years of age or older. The average household size was 2.20, and the average family size was 2.82.

In the city, the population was spread out, with 19.8 percent under the age of 18, 13.7 percent from 18 to 24, 28.1 percent from 25 to 44, 22.5 percent from 45 to 64, and 15.9 percent who were 65 years of age or older. The median age was 37 years. For every 100 females, there were 91.1 males. For every 100 females age 18 and over, there were 88.0 males.

The median income for a household in the city was $30,835, and the median income for a family was $40,977. Males had a median income of $31,326 versus $22,150 for females. The per capita income for the city was $20,364. About 11.4 percent of families and 15.9 percent of the population were below the poverty line, including 18.9 percent of those under age 18 and 12.7 percent of those age 65 or over.

== Economy ==
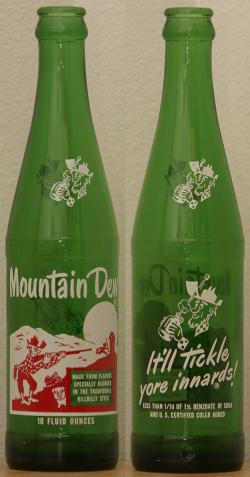
Mountain Dew traces its origins to the city.

Johnson City is an economic hub largely fueled by East Tennessee State University and the medical "Med-Tech" corridor, anchored by the Johnson City Medical Center and Niswonger Children's Hospital, Franklin Woods Community Hospital, ETSU's Gatton College of Pharmacy, and ETSU's Quillen College of Medicine.

The citrus soda Mountain Dew originated in Johnson City. In 2012, PepsiCo announced a new malt-flavored version of the drink named Mountain Dew Johnson City Gold.

Johnson City and its metropolitan area had a gross metropolitan product of US$9.1 billion in 2019.

Top employers in Johnson City (2008)
| Employer | Number of employees |
|---|---|
| Ballad Health | 3541 |
| East Tennessee State University | 1990 |
| Washington County School System | 1275 |
| James H. Quillen VA Medical Center | 1259 |
| American Water Heater Company | 1194 |
| AT&T Mobility | 1000 |

=== Major companies headquartered in Johnson City ===
- American Water Heater Company (owned by A.O. Smith Corp.)
- Advanced Call Center Technologies
- Cantech Industries
- General Shale (owned by Wienerberger)
- LPI, Inc.
- Moody Dunbar, Inc.
- Mullican Flooring
- R.A. Colby, Inc.
- TPI Corporation
- VCV Rack

=== Other companies ===
- JD Squared, manufacturer of tube and pipe benders and other fabrication tools

== Arts and culture ==
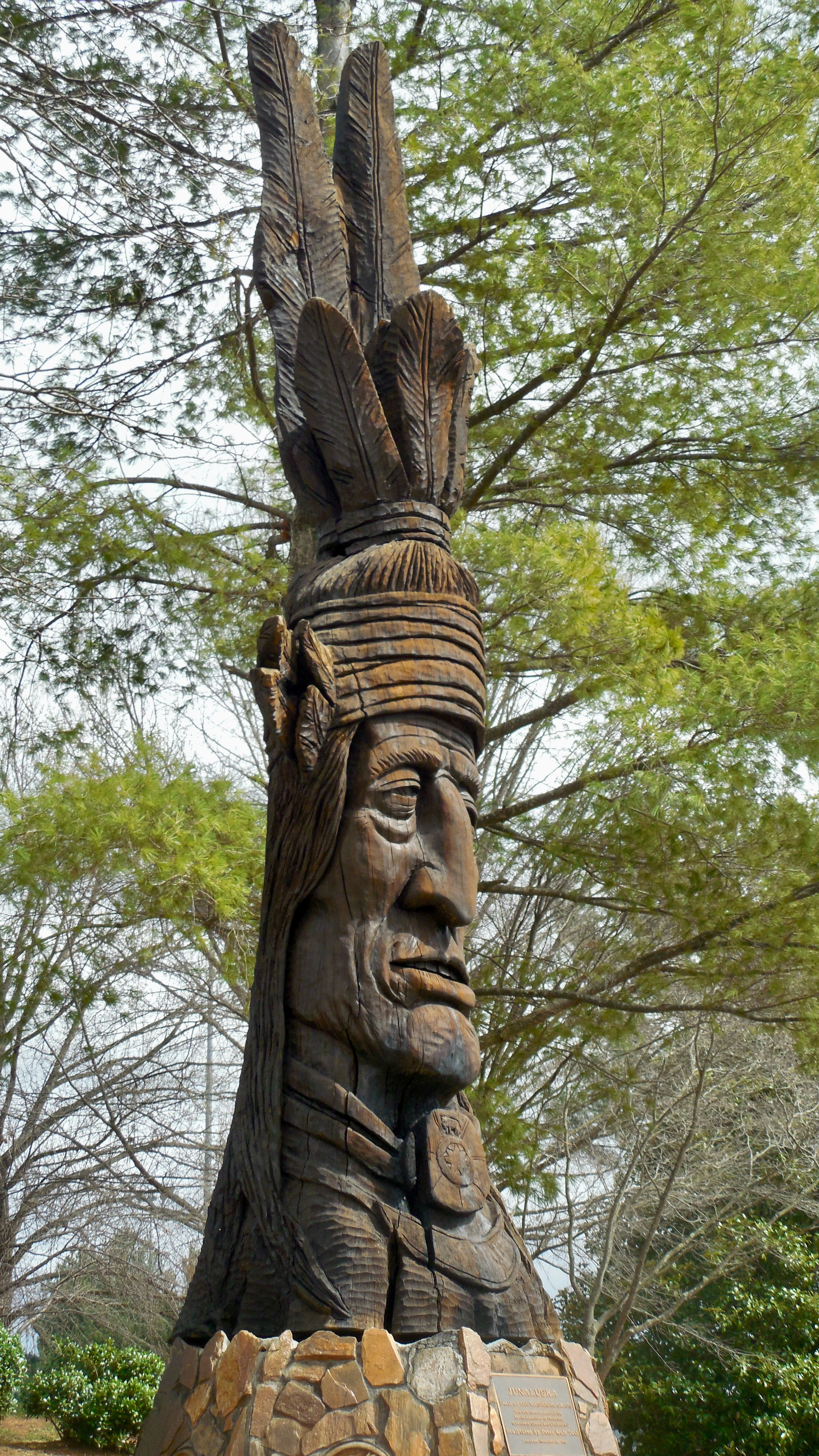
Monument of Chief Junaluska in Metro-Kiwanis Park, Johnson City

=== Public art ===
Public art includes 12 to 15 sculptures that change every two years. Also, 24 bronze statuettes of animals indigenous to the Appalachian Highlands, cast by faculty and students at ETSU, are installed in various downtown locations; staff at the Johnson City Public Library created a list of clues to aid in the search for all the animals. Other public art includes banners and art on light poles and traffic boxes, and quote stones along sidewalks and paths. Two annual art events take place in the city.

=== Shopping ===
As a regional hub for a four-state area, Johnson City is home to a large variety of retail businesses, from well-known national chains to local boutiques and galleries.

The Mall at Johnson City is the city's only enclosed shopping mall. Much of the new retail development is in North Johnson City, along State of Franklin Road. Johnson City Crossings is the largest of these developments.

=== Points of interest ===
- Buffalo Mountain Park
- East Tennessee State University Arboretum
- ETSU/Mountain States Health Alliance Athletic Center
- Founders Park
- Freedom Hall Civic Center
- Johnson City STOLport
- Thomas Stadium, baseball venue
- Tipton-Haynes State Historic Site
- Tweetsie Trail
- Watauga River
- William B. Greene Jr. Stadium
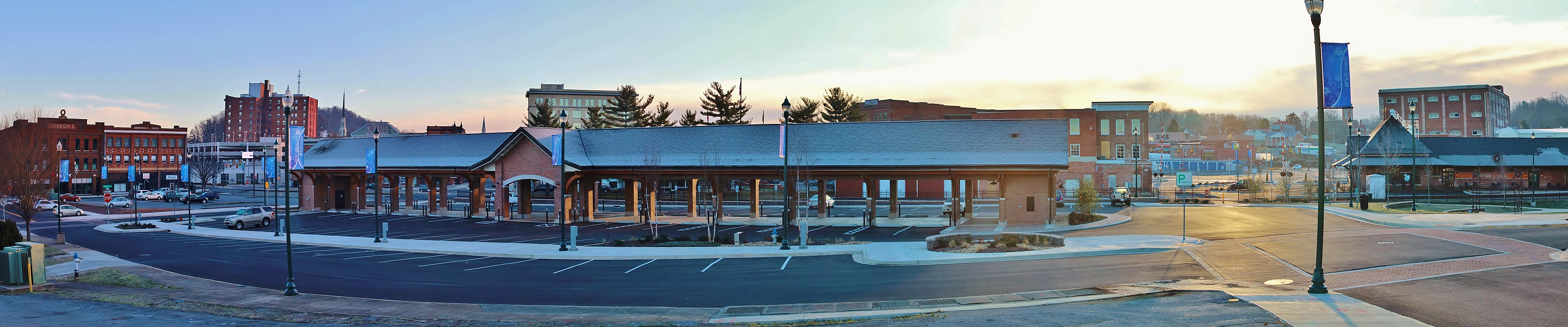
The Pavilion at Founder's Park hosts the local farmer's market.

== Sports ==
Several Minor League Baseball teams have been based in Johnson City. Professional baseball was first played in the city by the Johnson City Soldiers in the Southeastern League in 1910. The city's longest-running team was the Johnson City Cardinals, who played in the Appalachian League as the Rookie affiliate of the St. Louis Cardinals from 1975 to 2020 and the earlier Johnson City Cardinals (1939–1955) also of the Appalachian League. In conjunction with a contraction of Minor League Baseball beginning with the 2021 season, the Appalachian League was reorganized as a collegiate summer baseball league, and the Cardinals were replaced by the Johnson City Doughboys, a new franchise in the revamped league designed for rising college freshman and sophomores.

== Government ==
In the United States House of Representatives, Johnson City is represented by Republican Diana Harshbarger of the 1st district.

Johnson City is run by a five-person board of commissioners. The former mayor John Hunter II resigned from his position after video emerged of him operating a vehicle while intoxicated; Hunter was replaced by real estate developer Greg Cox. The city manager is Cathy Ball. During Ball's tenure, Johnson City faced national scrutiny over the Sean Williams scandal, which involved allegations that local law enforcement failed for over a decade to properly investigate reports of sexual assault and drugging connected to Williams. Ball was later drawn into controversy after reporting revealed that she had attempted to purchase Williams's condominium in 2022 while he was a fugitive, though the city stated that she was unaware of the full circumstances surrounding him and denied wrongdoing. Ball was assisted by in this transaction by Shannon K. Castillo of Mitch Cox Companies.

== Education ==
=== Colleges and universities ===
East Tennessee State University has around 16,000 students in addition to a K–12 University School, a laboratory school of about 540 students. University School was the first laboratory school in the nation to adopt a year-round academic schedule.

Milligan University is just outside the city limits in Carter County, and has about 1,200 students in undergraduate and graduate programs.

Northeast State Community College has renovated a building in downtown Johnson City for use as a new satellite teaching site. After a dispute over the leasing amount being increased from $1,000/month to nearly $30,000/month, Northeast State decided not to renew their lease in 2023.

This building is now being utilized by East Tennessee State University to house the Department of Biological Sciences whilst Brown Hall, the main academic hall for the department on ETSU's main campus, goes through a new phase of renovations. Classes will begin being offered at this downtown satellite campus by ETSU in the Fall 2025 semester.

Tusculum University has a center on the north side of Johnson City in the Boones Creek area.

=== K–12 schools ===
Within Washington County, the vast majority of the city is in the Johnson City Independent School District, while small parts of the city are in the Washington County School District.

The portion in Carter County is within the Carter County School District. The portion in Sullivan County is within the Sullivan County School District.

Schools in the Johnson City School System include:

Elementary schools

- Cherokee Elementary
- Fairmont Elementary
- Lake Ridge Elementary
- Mt. View Elementary
- North Side Elementary
- South Side Elementary
- Towne Acres Elementary
- Woodland Elementary

Middle schools

- Indian Trail Middle School
- Liberty Bell Middle School

High schools

- Science Hill High School
- University School (K–12)

=== Private schools ===
- Ashley Academy (PreK–8)
- St. Mary's (K–8)
- Providence Academy (K–12)
- Tri-Cities Christian Schools (PreK–12)

== Media ==
=== Television ===
Johnson City is in the Tri-Cities (Tennessee-Virginia) media market, the 101st largest media market in the United States. WJHL-TV, the local CBS and NBC affiliate, is produced from a studio in downtown Johnson City.

=== Radio ===
There are four radio stations directly licensed to Johnson City. WETB is a commercial radio station affiliated with Compass Media Networks playing classic hits playing on 93.7 FM and 790AM. WETS-FM is the local NPR affiliate, and broadcasts talk radio, Americana, and classical music via three subchannels from a studio at East Tennessee State University. WJCW, owned by Cumulus Media, broadcasts talk radio at 910 AM. WQUT, also owned by Cumulus Media, broadcasts classic rock at 101.5 FM.

=== Newspapers ===
Johnson City has one commercial daily print newspaper, the Johnson City Press.

== Infrastructure ==
=== Transportation ===
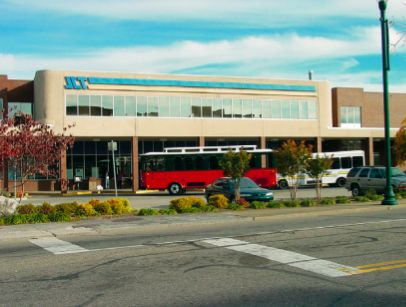
Transit center in downtown Johnson City

Johnson City is served by Tri-Cities Regional Airport in Blountville, Tennessee and Johnson City Airport (0A4) in Watauga, Tennessee. Johnson City was formerly served by Greyhound; some time between the 2022 discontinuation of Greyhound's lease and 2026, Greyhound service was discontinued.

==== Highways ====
- Interstate 26
- U.S. Route 19W
- U.S. Route 11E
- U.S. Route 321
- U.S. Route 23

==== Public transport ====
Johnson City Transit, the first municipal transit system created in Tennessee after World War II, operates 11 fixed bus routes using a 13 bus fleet. In 2025, it provided 386,917 trips. Johnson City Transit also operates BucShot, a transit circulator, for East Tennessee State University.

The Southern Railway used to serve Johnson City with several trains: the Birmingham Special (ended 1970), the Pelican (ended 1970) and the Tennessean (ended 1968). Several recent proposals have been made to restore rail service to Johnson City, including as a stop on an Amtrak line between Houston to New York and as a stop on a Tennessee-supported line connecting Knoxville and Bristol, and Virginia is currently pursuing study of an extension of the Northeast Regional from Roanoke, Virginia to nearby Bristol, Virginia.

=== Hospitals ===
Johnson City serves as a regional medical center for northeast Tennessee and southwest Virginia, along with parts of western North Carolina and southeastern Kentucky.

Johnson City Medical Center includes a level 1 trauma center, the Niswonger Children's Hospital, and Woodridge Hospital, an inpatient psychiatric hospital.

Franklin Woods Community Hospital is an 80-bed hospital with emergency services.

James H. and Cecile C. Quillen Rehabilitation Hospital serves patients who have suffered debilitating trauma, including stroke and brain-spine injuries.

== Notable people ==
- Bill Bain, management consultant, one of the founders of the management consultancy Bain & Company
- Sam Bettens, lead singer of rock band K's Choice; Johnson City firefighter for a year
- Jerry Blevins, Major League Baseball pitcher (New York Mets)
- Ernie Bowman, Major League Baseball (San Francisco Giants, 1961–63)
- Joe Bowman, bootmaker and marksman; guardian of western frontier culture
- Mike Brown, American Motorcyclist Association rider
- Jonny Campbell, soccer player
- Jo Carson, playwright and author
- George Lafayette Carter, entrepreneur
- David Cash, professional wrestler
- David Cole, founding member of C+C Music Factory
- Patrick J. Cronin, television and film actor, a professor in English and Theater at ETSU
- Matt Czuchry, actor (Gilmore Girls), attended Science Hill High School
- David Davis, Tennessee state senator; U.S. congressman 2007–2009
- Lindsay Ellis, film critic, YouTuber, cinematographer, and author
- Ray Flynn, miler with 89 sub-four-minute miles; graduated ETSU, president/CEO of Flynn Sports Management
- Aubrayo Franklin, defensive tackle, San Francisco 49ers
- Wyck Godfrey, film producer and studio executive
- Jake Grove, born in Johnson City; played center for Virginia Tech, won the Rimington Trophy, played for the Miami Dolphins
- Del Harris, NBA coach, attended Milligan College
- Holly Herndon, electronic musician
- Mark Herring, Attorney General of Virginia
- Herman Hickman, College Football Hall of Fame player for the Tennessee Vols and NFL player.
- Jim Hickman, professional baseball player, played outfield for the Brooklyn Dodgers
- Steven James, novelist, attended ETSU
- Drew Johnson, political commentator and columnist, and founder of the Beacon Center of Tennessee
- Amythyst Kiah, Americana singer/songwriter
- Brownie King, NASCAR driver
- Catherine Marshall, author, born in Johnson City, later worked on her novel Christy while staying with relatives in town
- John Alan Maxwell, artist and illustrator, raised in Johnson City, illustrated for Pearl S. Buck, John Steinbeck, and Sir Arthur Conan Doyle, spent his last 18 years in Johnson City; permanent collection housed at Carroll Reece Museum at ETSU
- Eddie McCreadie, Scottish born soccer player
- Johnny Miller, NASCAR driver
- Daniel Norris, Major League Baseball, debuted with the Toronto Blue Jays in 2014
- Eureka O'Hara, drag queen and television personality
- Mike Potter, NASCAR driver
- David Phil Roe, mayor of Johnson City, and representative for Tennessee's 1st congressional district 2009–2021
- Darius Rucker, rock/country musician known for his time in Hootie & the Blowfish
- Bryan Lewis Saunders, artist and writer, ETSU alumnus
- Connie Saylor, NASCAR driver and Johnson City business owner
- Constance Shulman, actress, singer, producer
- Steve Spurrier, Heisman Trophy-winning quarterback and College Football Hall of Fame coach, spent most of his childhood in Johnson City and attended Science Hill High School; namesake of the school's football field
- Robert Love Taylor and Alfred A. Taylor, brothers who were both governor of Tennessee; each owned and resided in Robins' Roost, historic house on South Roan Street
- Brad Teague, NASCAR driver
- Phyllis Tickle, prominent author on religion and spirituality
- Ed Whitson, MLB pitcher known for a brief but colorful stint with the Yankees in the 1980s
- Samuel Cole Williams, historian, jurist, first dean of the Emory University School of Law
- Van Williams, NFL running back and kick returner for Buffalo Bills, All-American at Carson-Newman, attended Science Hill High School

== Sister cities ==
Johnson City's sister cities are:

- Guaranda, Ecuador
- Ronneby, Sweden
- Rybinsk, Russia
- Teterow, Germany

== See also ==
- Music of East Tennessee
