= Mo Sabri =

American singer, songwriter, and filmmaker

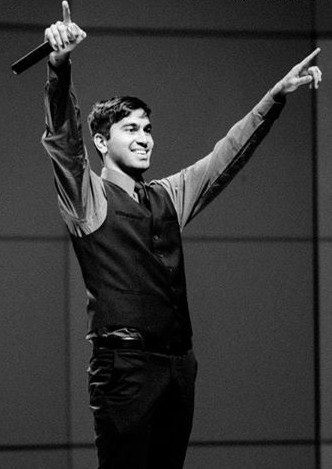

Background information
- Born: Mo Sabri
- Origin: Johnson City, Tennessee, US
- Genres: Pop, Country, Hip hop, Alternative, acoustic
- Occupations: singer-songwriter, producer, musician
- Instruments: Vocals, guitar, bass guitar, percussion, piano
- Years active: 2010–present
- Website: mosabri.com

Mo Sabri is an American singer, songwriter, and filmmaker from Johnson City, Tennessee. He first rose to prominence on YouTube and is a musician credited by The Washington Post with transforming his subgenre of music. Also known for his fashion choices, Sabri has been featured in Vogue and named "Best Dressed" at the Grammy Awards. In February 2013, the positive impact of his music received further recognition and he was invited to Washington D.C. to attend breakfast with President Barack Obama. Sabri's first album, The Overnight Classic, debuted as one of the top five highest-selling albums on the iTunes World chart during its first week in 2012.

== Early life ==
Mo Sabri was born in Johnson City, Tennessee to Pakistani immigrants. After playing double bass in his middle school orchestra, Mo Sabri taught himself to play guitar and started recording rap songs in high school. He started performing concerts worldwide when he was still a pre-medicine student at East Tennessee State University. He graduated from college in 2013 and became a full-time recording artist.

== Career ==
Mo Sabri first rose to prominence at a local level after the online release of his song "Johnson City, Tennessee" in 2011. He started to tour nationally and internationally while releasing more songs on his YouTube channel and continued to gain popularity worldwide. His music videos have received millions of views and feature cameos by celebrities including Dallas Cowboys tight end Jason Witten, Detroit Tigers pitcher Daniel Norris, Congressman Phil Roe, comedian Aziz Ansari, and rapper B.o.B.

Mo Sabri was a headlining artist at the BBC-sponsored 2011 Cardiff Mela festival in Cardiff, Wales.

At the 59th Grammy Awards, Sabri wore a high-fashion sherwani on the red carpet and made multiple best-dressed lists.

Sabri has been featured in national and international press including Huffington Post, The Washington Post, BBC, GEO TV, and Voice of America.

== Musical style ==
Mo Sabri's music falls into the alternative hip hop genre. His lyrics touch on subjects such as love, society, personal struggles, religion, and it has been said that his music "transcends politics and religion". Some of his songs carry an underlying message of faith. Several of his songs have South Asian (also known as "Desi") instrumental influences.

== Discography ==
Mo Sabri's debut album, The Overnight Classic, was released in January 2012 and was one of the top five highest-selling albums on the iTunes World chart for its first week. He is currently recording his second album.

=== Albums ===
List of albums, with year released
Title	Album details
The Overnight Classic	Released: January 1, 2012; Format: CD, Digital download

== Videography ==
- 2009: "What's Your Name Again?"
- 2011: "Johnson City, Tennessee"
- 2012: "Heaven Is Where Her Heart Is"
- 2012: "Jesus"
- 2015: "The Light"
