= Ballad Health =

Healthcare company based in Tennessee, US

- Formerly: Wellmont Health Systems/Mountain States Health Alliance
- Industry: Health care
- Founded: 2018
- Headquarters: 408 N State of Franklin Rd., Johnson City, Tennessee, United States
- Area served: Tennessee, Virginia, North Carolina, Kentucky
- Number of employees: 13,800
- Website: www.balladhealth.org

Ballad Health is a chain of hospitals headquartered in Johnson City, Tennessee. It includes 20 hospitals, including Niswonger Children's Hospital and Woodridge Psychiatric Hospital, and numerous outpatient facilities in Tennessee and Virginia including urgent care centers and primary care locations. They operate a blood bank named Marsh Regional Blood Center. The healthcare system's website states that its service area includes 29 counties, some of which are in Kentucky and North Carolina.

In 2018 Ballad was formed through a Certificate of Public Advantage (COPA) by the State of Tennessee (and a Cooperative Agreement in Virginia) which allowed for the merger of Mountain States Health Alliance and Wellmont Health System. The Federal Trade Commission opposed the merger.

Under the COPA, Ballad has closed or converted several rural facilities with approval from the Tennessee and Virginia departments of health. Some community members and local officials have expressed concerns about the consolidation of facilities. In December 2025, S&P Global revised Ballad Health's credit outlook to positive.

== History ==
Ballad Health was created in 2018 when Mountain States Health Alliance and Wellmont Health Systems agreed to merge together through the issuance of a certificate of public advantage (COPA) in Tennessee and a cooperative agreement in Virginia.

Lee County Community Hospital, which had closed in 2013, was reopened by Ballad Health in July 2021.

Dennis Barry, a monitor for the Southwest Virginia Health Authority, stated that the Ballad merger may have prevented many Virginians from losing health care during the COVID-19 pandemic.

In 2022, Ballad Health launched a virtual urgent care option.

Ballad Health reported a $40 million net operating loss for discal year 2023, its first annual operating loss since the merger.
