= Brundidge, Alabama =

City in Alabama, United States

Brundidge
- City
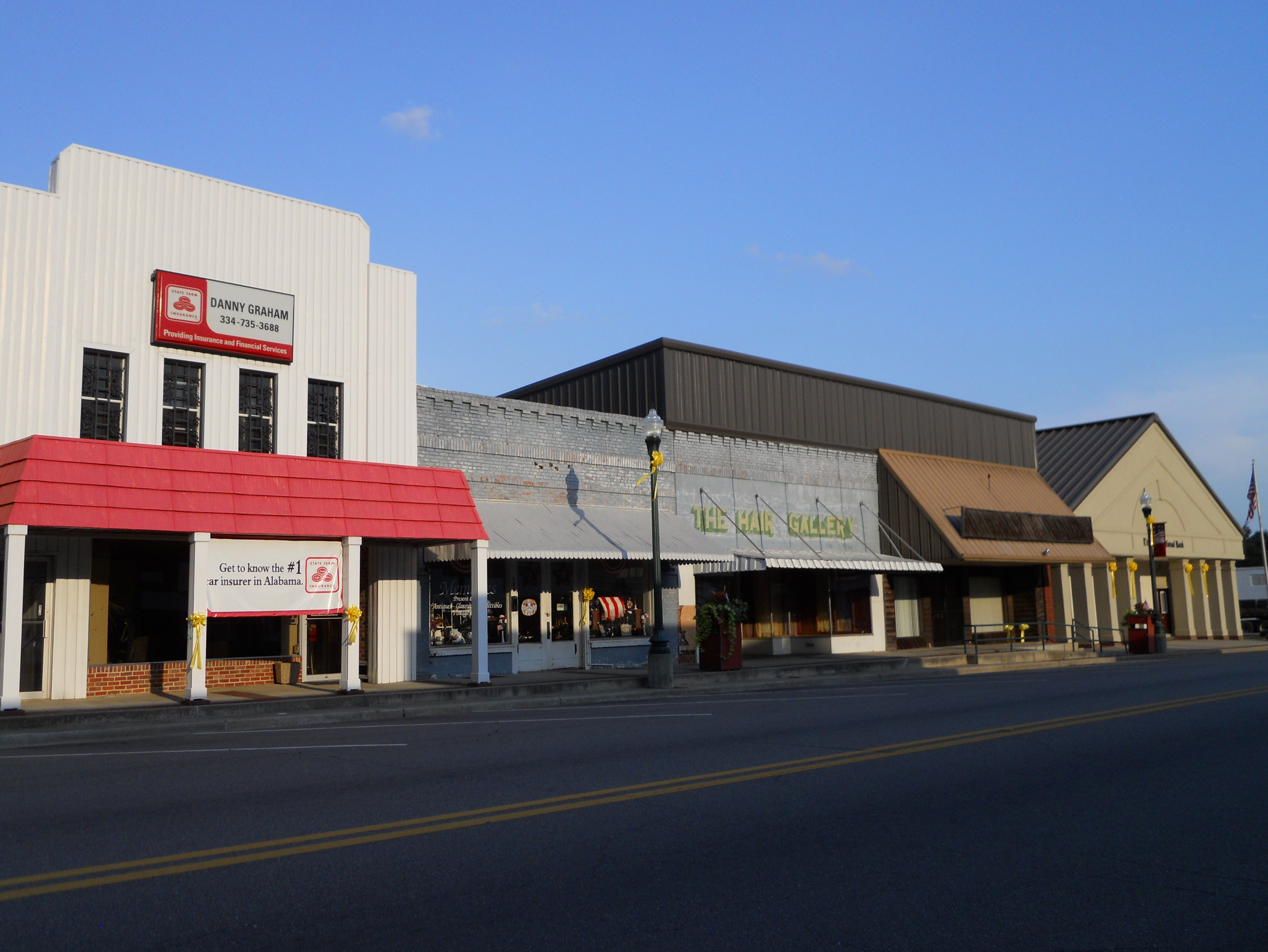
- Alabama's Own Antique City
- Nickname: Antique City
- Location of Brundidge in Pike County, Alabama.
- Coordinates: 31°43′06″N 85°49′04″W
- Country: United States
- State: Alabama
- County: Pike

Government
  - Mayor: Isabell Boyd

Area
  - Total: 9.78 sq mi (25.32 km^{2})
  - Land: 9.75 sq mi (25.24 km^{2})
  - Water: 0.031 sq mi (0.08 km^{2})
- Elevation: 459 ft (140 m)

Population (2020)
  - Total: 2,073
  - Density: 212.7/sq mi (82.13/km^{2})
- Time zone: UTC-6 (Central (CST))
  - Summer (DST): UTC-5 (CDT)
- ZIP code: 36010
- Area code: 334
- FIPS code: 01-10240
- GNIS feature ID: 2403943
- Website: brundidge.org

Brundidge is the second-largest city in Pike County, Alabama, United States. As of the 2020 census, Brundidge had a population of 2,073.

The city was once a major producer of peanut butter. Brundidge holds a Peanut Butter Festival during the last Saturday of each October, which includes live music, a recipe contest, and a parade.

The city has a large number of antique stores in its historic downtown.

== History ==
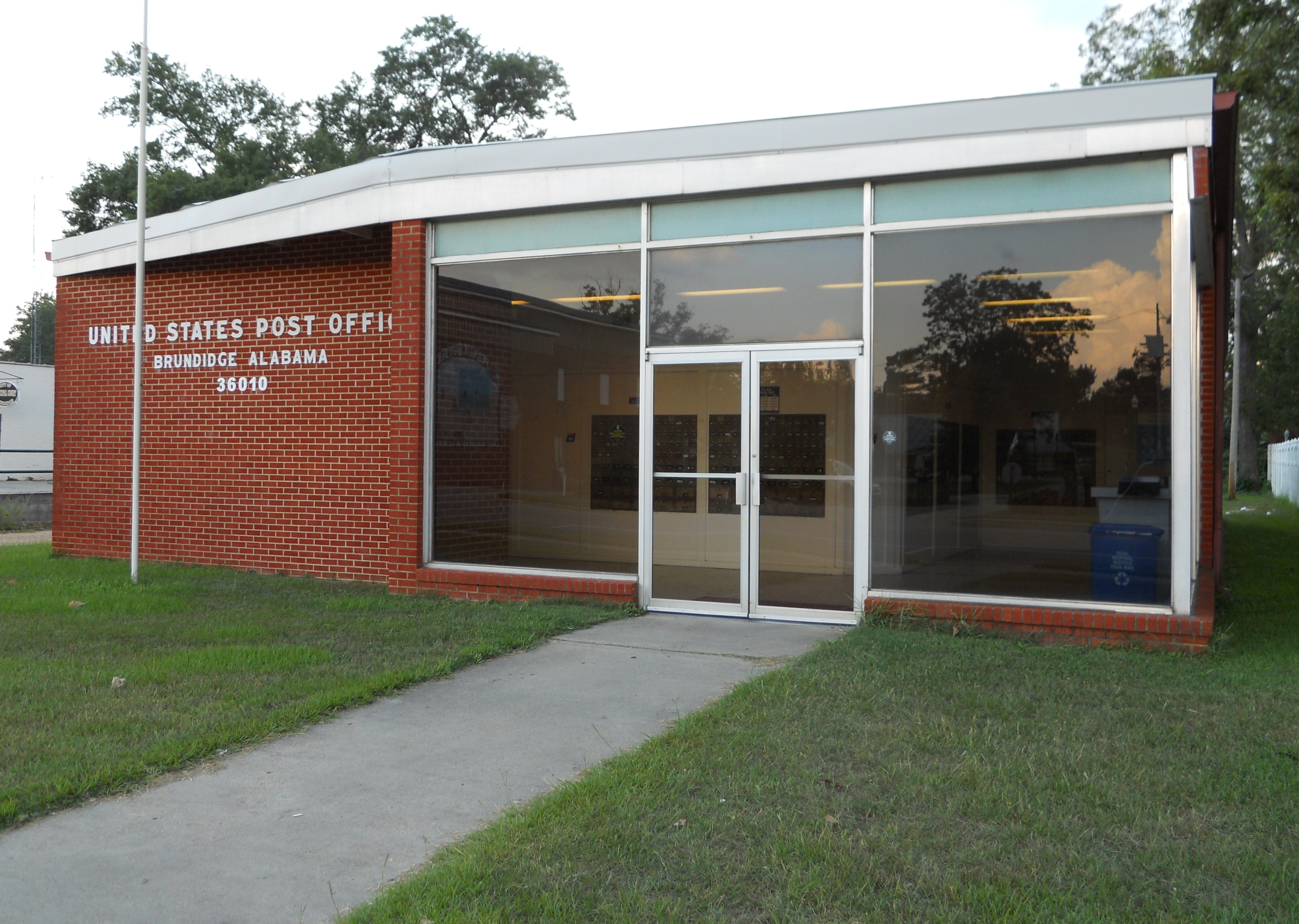
Brundidge Post Office

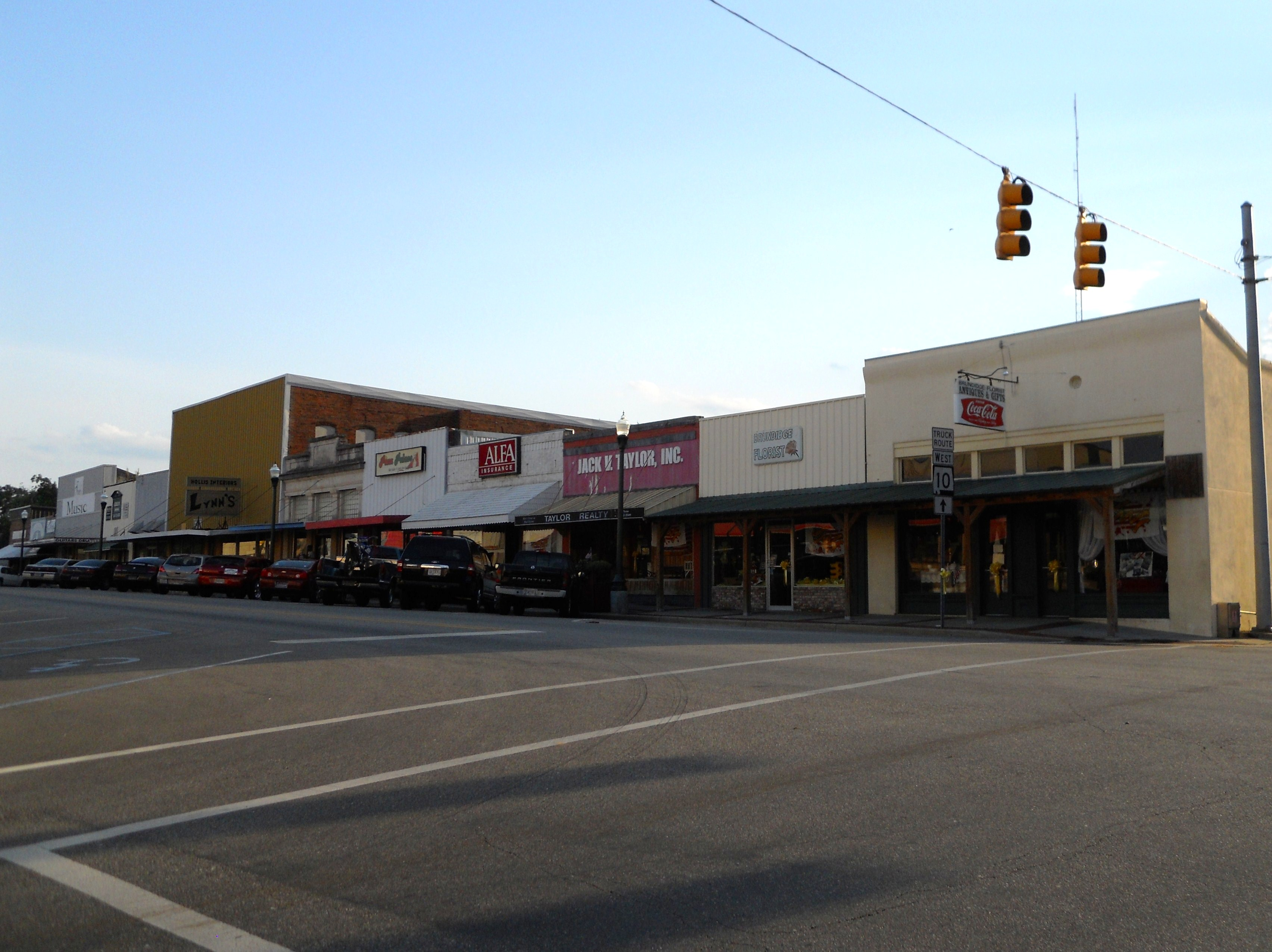
Downtown Brundidge

The town was founded prior to the Civil War by George C. Collier, who established a trading post and saloon. First called "Collier's Store", the town changed its name around 1854 to honor James M. Brundidge, a prominent citizen and founder of the local Masonic lodge.

During the Civil War, men from Pike County joined "Company F", the "Brundidge Guards", of the 15th Regiment Alabama Infantry.

Brundidge grew as an agricultural center after the war. A depot of the newly constructed Alabama Midland Railway was established in Brundidge in 1889. Several hotels and businesses followed. Passenger trains such as the South Wind once passed. The railway line is now the Dothan Subdivision, used for freight operations by CSX Transportation.

Brundidge incorporated in 1893. In 1900, the Brundidge Banking Company opened, followed by the First National Bank in 1904. Brundidge has had three newspapers: the Brundidge News began publication in 1893, the Brundidge Sentinel began in 1926, and the Brundidge Banner in 1962. All have ceased publication.

In the 1920s, Brundidge native Alonza E. Johnston opened a peanut butter mill, and his Johnston Oil Company was soon shipping more than two million jars per year. The company also produced velvet bread and mayonnaise, and operated warehouses, gins, and an ice plant.

The business has ceased operation. The old Johnston Mill and General Store has been adapted as a museum. The mill, as well as the Lightfoot House in Brundidge, are both listed on the Alabama Register of Landmarks and Heritage.

== Geography ==
According to the U.S. Census Bureau, the city has a total area of 9.7 square miles (25 km^{2}), of which 9.7 square miles (25 km^{2}) is land and 0.04 square miles (0.10 km^{2}) (0.31%) is water.

=== Climate ===
The climate in this area is characterized by hot, humid summers and generally mild to cool winters. According to the Köppen Climate Classification system, Brundidge has a humid subtropical climate, abbreviated "Cfa" on climate maps.

== Demographics ==
Historical population
Census	Pop.	Note	%±
1880	387		—
1900	537		—
1910	815		51.8%
1920	941		15.5%
1930	1,434		52.4%
1940	1,909		33.1%
1950	2,605		36.5%
1960	2,523		−3.1%
1970	2,709		7.4%
1980	3,188		17.7%
1990	2,472		−22.5%
2000	2,341		−5.3%
2010	2,076		−11.3%
2020	2,073		−0.1%
U.S. Decennial Census; 2013 Estimate

=== Racial and ethnic composition ===
Brundidge city, Alabama – Racial and ethnic composition Note: the US Census treats Hispanic/Latino as an ethnic category. This table excludes Latinos from the racial categories and assigns them to a separate category. Hispanics/Latinos may be of any race.
Race / Ethnicity (NH = Non-Hispanic)	Pop 1980	Pop 1990	Pop 2000	Pop 2010	Pop 2020	% 1980	% 1990	% 2000	% 2010	% 2020
White alone (NH)	1,463	906	777	671	528	45.89%	36.65%	33.19%	32.32%	25.47%
Black or African American alone (NH)	1,693	1,532	1,475	1,302	1,396	53.11%	61.97%	63.01%	62.72%	67.34%
Native American or Alaska Native alone (NH)	0	18	12	10	8	0.00%	0.73%	0.51%	0.48%	0.39%
Asian alone (NH)	0	8	6	7	6	0.00%	0.32%	0.26%	0.34%	0.29%
Native Hawaiian or Pacific Islander alone (NH)	x	x	0	0	2	x	x	0.00%	0.00%	0.10%
Other race alone (NH)	0	0	0	0	10	0.00%	0.00%	0.00%	0.00%	0.48%
Mixed race or Multiracial (NH)	x	x	52	24	78	x	x	2.22%	1.16%	3.76%
Hispanic or Latino (any race)	32	8	19	62	45	1.00%	0.32%	0.81%	2.99%	2.17%
Total	3,188	2,472	2,341	2,076	2,073	100.00%	100.00%	100.00%	100.00%	100.00%

=== 2020 census ===
As of the 2020 census, there were 2,073 people, 1,010 households, and 485 families residing in the city. The median age was 47.8 years. 20.3% of residents were under the age of 18 and 22.3% were 65 years of age or older. For every 100 females there were 87.8 males, and for every 100 females age 18 and over there were 85.8 males age 18 and over.

0.0% of residents lived in urban areas, while 100.0% lived in rural areas.

Of the 1,010 households, 24.3% had children under the age of 18 living in them. Of all households, 23.9% were married-couple households, 25.7% were households with a male householder and no spouse or partner present, and 45.0% were households with a female householder and no spouse or partner present. About 44.0% of all households were made up of individuals and 18.7% had someone living alone who was 65 years of age or older.

There were 1,164 housing units, of which 13.2% were vacant. The homeowner vacancy rate was 0.6% and the rental vacancy rate was 7.1%.

=== 2010 census ===
As of the census of 2010, there were 2,076 people, 940 households, and 559 families residing in the city. The population density was 214.0 inhabitants per square mile (82.6/km^{2}). There were 1,086 housing units at an average density of 112.0 per square mile (43.2/km^{2}). The racial makeup of the city was 62.9% Black or African American, 34.1% White, 0.5% Native American, 0.6% Asian, and 1.3% from two or more races. 3.0% of the population were Hispanic or Latino of any race.

There were 940 households, out of which 18.9% had children under the age of 18 living with them, 33.2% were married couples living together, 20.1% had a female householder with no husband present, and 40.5% were non-families. 37.6% of all households were made up of individuals, and 15.5% had someone living alone who was 65 years of age or older. The average household size was 2.21 and the average family size was 2.86.

In the city, the population was spread out, with 19.7% under the age of 18, 7.4% from 18 to 24, 21.5% from 25 to 44, 30.4% from 45 to 64, and 21.0% who were 65 years of age or older. The median age was 46.1 years. For every 100 females, there were 85.5 males. For every 100 females age 18 and over, there were 89.8 males.

The median income for a household in the city was $21,798, and the median income for a family was $29,073. Males had a median income of $30,517 versus $19,315 for females. The per capita income for the city was $14,671. About 23.7% of families and 33.5% of the population were below the poverty line, including 55.5% of those under age 18 and 21.3% of those age 65 or over.

=== 2000 census ===
As of the census of 2000, there were 2,341 people, 1,014 households, and 652 families residing in the city. The population density was 241.2 inhabitants per square mile (93.1/km^{2}). There were 1,192 housing units at an average density of 122.8 per square mile (47.4/km^{2}). The racial makeup of the city was 63.52% Black or African American, 33.40% White, 0.51% Native American, 0.26% Asian, and 2.31% from two or more races. 0.81% of the population were Hispanic or Latino of any race.

There were 1,014 households, out of which 23.1% had children under the age of 18 living with them, 36.7% were married couples living together, 24.1% had a female householder with no husband present, and 35.7% were non-families. 33.3% of all households were made up of individuals, and 15.6% had someone living alone who was 65 years of age or older. The average household size was 2.30 and the average family size was 2.93.

In the city, the population was spread out, with 22.7% under the age of 18, 8.1% from 18 to 24, 23.3% from 25 to 44, 26.4% from 45 to 64, and 19.5% who were 65 years of age or older. The median age was 42 years. For every 100 females, there were 82.3 males. For every 100 females age 18 and over, there were 75.0 males.

The median income for a household in the city was $16,774, and the median income for a family was $19,531. Males had a median income of $25,720 versus $16,358 for females. The per capita income for the city was $12,357. About 31.6% of families and 35.5% of the population were below the poverty line, including 51.0% of those under age 18 and 37.0% of those age 65 or over.

== Economy ==
A Walmart distribution center is located west of the city along U.S. Route 231. It is the area's largest employer, employing about 800 people.

== Education ==
Brundidge Public Schools are part of the Pike County Schools. Schools in the district include Goshen Elementary School, Pike County Elementary School, Banks Middle School, Goshen High School, Pike County High School and the Troy-Pike Center for Technology.

Pike County Elementary School and Pike County High School are located in Brundidge.

Dr. Mark Bazzell is the Superintendent of Schools.

== Infrastructure ==
U.S. Route 231 passes west of the city, and Alabama State Route 93 and Alabama State Route 10 bisect the center of Brundidge.

The Brundidge Municipal Airport is now closed. The nearest airport is Troy Municipal Airport.

== Notable people ==
- Fred Baxter, professional football player for the New York Jets and Washington Redskins.
- Walter L. Fleming, historian of the Dunning School and leader at Vanderbilt University.
- Cornelius Griffin, professional football player for the Washington Redskins.
- William Oscar Mulkey, U.S. Representative from Alabama.
- Jacob Broughton Nelson, founder of Phi Kappa secondary school fraternity.
- Herb Siler, heavyweight boxer who went four rounds against Muhammad Ali in 1960.
- Robert L. Williams, third governor of Oklahoma.
