= Ishee =

Ishee is a surname. Notable people with the surname include:

- David M. Ishee (born 1963), American jurist
- Roger Ishee (1930–2015), American petroleum engineer and politician
- Thomas Ishee (born 1965), United States Navy rear admiral
- Andrew Ishee, American pianist in The Kingsmen Quartet
- Jeff Ishee, (born 1958) American farm broadcaster radio and television
