= Jacob Broughton Nelson =

American fraternity founder

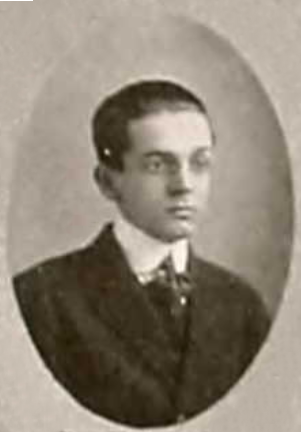
- Jacob Broughton Nelson, Southern University 1915
- Born: July 30, 1898; Brundidge, Alabama, US
- Known for: founder of Phi Kappa

Jacob Broughton Nelson (July 30, 1898 – after 1924) was the founder of Phi Kappa secondary school fraternity. In addition to being a member of the Alpha chapter at Southern University Preparatory School in Greensboro, Alabama, he helped establish three additional chapters of the fraternity. Nelson became the fraternity's first Grand Master in the spring of 1919. In later years, the Phi Kappa lost touch with Nelson. Unknown to the fraternity, Nelson was convicted of theft and served time in the South Dakota penitentiary.

== Early life ==
Nelson was born on July 30, 1898, in Brundidge, Alabama. His parents were Laura Hill (née Locke) and Jacob Boone Nelsen, a circuit preacher for the Methodist Episcopal Church, South. While growing up, his family lived in Summerfield, Alabama; Dellwood, Jackson County, Florida; and Troy, Alabama. His father died in December 1916.

From 1914 to 1917, Nelson attended the Southern University in Greensboro, Alabama. His freshman year, he belonged to the Clariosophic Literary Society, the Glee Club, the Intercollegiate Oratorical Association, the Y.M.C.A. Bible Study Group, and the Society of the Much Abused or The Independent Order of Preacher's Sons and Daughters. In October 1914, he represented the university's Y.M.C.A. at the state conference. In February 1915, he was appointed Y.M.C.A. music chairman. He was also a member of the Phi Kappa fraternity. Because of his father's death, Nelson withdraw from the school after his junior year.

== Phi Kappa ==
While he was a student at Southern University Preparatory School, Nelson joined Phi Kappa fraternity. At the end of the semester in May 1917, Nelson returned home to Troy, where he founded the Upsilon chapter of Phi Kappa. By the early fall 1917, the Upsilon chapter had a social room and chapter room above a store on the Troy town square. When four members of the Upsilon chapter attended the Gulf Coast Military Academy in Gulfport, Mississippi, they worked with Nelson to create the Mu Theta chapter there. Nelson also oversaw the chartering of the Gamma Beta chapter at the Emory University Academy in Oxford, Georgia.

Because the Alpha chapter at Southern University Preparatory School operated sub-rosa for several years and its founders' details were lost, the fraternity considers Nelson as its "titular founder". Nelson became Phi Kappa's first Grand Master in the spring of 1919. In May 1919, he attended a banquet of the Upsilon chapter in Troy where he served as the toastmaster. The fraternity lost contact with Nelson after 1920. The Troy chapter went defunct without his leadership.

== Later life ==
In August 1917, Nelson returned to Southern University where he worked as the private secretary of President Daniels. When America entered World War I, he joined the local Red Cross organization. He was inducted into the military but did not serve. In 1918, Nelson was a bookkeeper with Rosenberg Bros. in Pike County, Alabama.

In September 1919, Nelson traveled to Flandreau, South Dakota and North Dakota for business. In 1920, he lived in Flandreau where he worked as an underwriter for an insurance company. In 1921, he moved to Sioux Falls, South Dakota, hoping to pass as a relative of a recluse in Flandreau. When that failed, he became an accountant for the Bourroughs Adding Machine Company in Sioux Falls.

In Sioux Falls, Nelson joined the Masons and was the organist for the Unity Lodge. He was also a member of the Knights of Pythias and the secretary and treasurer of the South Dakota Legion of the Mooseheart, No. 194 of Sioux Falls. However, there were also signs that Nelson was not forthright. Although of German ancestry, the Alabama-born Nelson told people in Sioux Falls that he was born in Germany. He initially attended the Episcopal church and became a Sunday school teacher. There, he told stories of his connections to the English aristocracy. After his relationship with the church declined, he became a member of the Catholic Church where he claimed to have studied theology and expressed a desire to join the clergy. Soon, he became the scoutmaster of the church's Boy Scout troop.

In 1920, Nelson started the Sioux Stamp Company at 225 1/2 South Main in Sioux Falls with partners K. B. Woodruff and F. W. Steer. The business bought and sold collectible postage stamps and reported an inventory of around 1,500,000 stamps, worth $10,000 ($164,067 in 2022's money) in July 1921. It also sold company stock to local businessmen. By February 1922, the business had moved to a larger suite in the National Bank Building and had established a branch in Kansas City, Missouri. Nelson was proposed for membership in the American Philatelic Society in April 1921. However, the business failed; its stockholders lost their investment and Nelson was broke.

Around the time that his business failed, members of the Moose Lodge discovered that $144.44 was missing. Nelson borrowed $50 from a friend on July 1, 1922, claiming he needed the loan to travel to Chicago for his half-brother's funeral. The next day, Nelson left Sioux Falls for Canada after embezzling funds from the Legion of the Mooseheart. He was accompanied by fifteen-year-old Clyde Smith, a member of the Boy Scout troop of which Nelson was the leader. The two traveled separately to avoid detection. After the two sent Smith's mother a letter, she contacted the Family Welfare Association which contacted Canadian authorities.

Officials feared Nelson had kidnapped Smith. Later, Smith claimed that he went willingly after Nelson promised adventures fishing, hunting, and trapping, as well as money. Although Nelson talked about acquiring a farm, Smith ended up working as a clerk in Winnipeg and Nelson sold typewriters. The two claimed to be the Newman brothers and also went by the aliases William Regan (Nelson) and Jack Wilson (Smith). When Nelson lost his job, he told Smith he was leaving to become a Catholic clergyman in Toronto.

The Royal Northwest Mounted Police traced the fugitives through Saskatchewan to Winnipeg, where they found Smith on October 27, 1922. With Smith's help, the police caught Nelson as he stepped off a train in Toronto. Nelson was arrested and charged with contributing to the delinquency of a minor, kidnapping, fraud, and embezzlement. In late October, Smith's mother went to Winnipeg to retrieve her son; Smith returned to Sioux Falls on November 2, 1922.

Nelson was extradited to Sioux Falls on November 4, 1922. He had a preliminary hearing in municipal court on November 6 where his bail was set at $500. On November 10, 1922, Nelson pled guilty to theft of the Mooseheart Legion funds; he had returned the $244.41 that he embezzled when he returned from Canada. Judge Medin of the Circuit Court sentenced Nelson to eighteen months in the South Dakota penitentiary. The judge also reproved Nelson for the fictitious background stories that he told in Sioux Falls. Nelson was expelled from the American Philatelic Society in December 1922.

In September 1927, Mrs. J. B. Nelson of Sioux Falls ran an advertisement looking for her husband, last known to be in Perryton, Texas. One fraternity historian says Nelson died of tuberculosis in Colorado but official records do not confirm this'; another report claimed that he moved to Texas. Phi Kappa presents the Jacob Broughton Nelson Award to the fraternity's outstanding grandmaster of the year; the award was named in honor of Nelson.
