= Phi Kappa =

Phi Kappa may refer to:

- Phi Kappa (Catholic fraternity), a higher education fraternity founded in 1889 and one of the two fraternities that merged to form Phi Kappa Theta
- Phi Kappa Literary Society, a debate society founded in 1820 at the University of Georgia
- Phi Kappa (secondary), a secondary school (high school) fraternity founded in 1900
