= Brundidge Municipal Airport =

Airport in Alabama, United States

- IATA: none; ICAO: none; FAA LID: 60A

Summary
- Airport type: Public
- Owner: City of Brundidge
- Serves: Brundidge, Alabama
- Elevation AMSL: 476 ft (145 m)
- Coordinates: 31°43′58″N 085°48′15″W

Map
- Location of airport in Alabama

Runways
Direction	Length		Surface
Direction	ft	m	Surface
5/23	3,000	914	Asphalt

Statistics (1999)
- Aircraft operations: 2,627
- Source: Federal Aviation Administration

Brundidge Municipal Airport (FAA LID: 60A) was a city-owned, public-use airport located one nautical mile (1.85 km) northeast of the central business district of the Brundidge, a city in Pike County, Alabama, United States. It is currently closed indefinitely.

== Facilities and aircraft ==
Brundidge Municipal Airport covers an area of 40 acres (16 ha) at an elevation of 476 feet (145 m) above mean sea level. It has one runway designated 5/23 with an asphalt surface measuring 3,000 by 80 feet (914 x 24 m).

For the 12-month period ending October 13, 1999, the airport had 2,627 general aviation aircraft operations, an average of 218 per month.
