= Jess H. Dickinson =

American judge

Jess Hays Dickinson

Associate Justice of the Supreme Court of Mississippi
- In office 2004–2017
- Succeeded by: David M. Ishee

Personal details
- Born: March 25, 1947 (age 79) Charleston, Mississippi, U.S.
- Spouse: Janet

Jess Hays Dickinson (born March 25, 1947) is a former Presiding Justice of the Supreme Court of Mississippi.

== Biography ==
Jess Hays Dickinson was born in Charleston, Mississippi. His mother was Laura Augusta Hays (1920–2008). He has a brother, Leonard Lee Dickinson III.

He earned a bachelor's degree from Mississippi State University in 1978, and a Juris Doctor from the University of Mississippi School of Law in 1982.

He practiced law in Jackson and Gulfport before serving as a Forrest Circuit Court Judge. He joined the Supreme Court in January 2004. He has been a member of the adjunct faculty of both William Carey College and the Mississippi College School of Law, as well as serving on two committees for the Mississippi Bar. Dickinson is a charter member of the Mississippi Access to Justice Commission.

He is married and has four sons. Dickinson is a member of the local Mississippi bluegrass and folk band "Bluegrass Appeal."

== See also ==
- List of justices of the Supreme Court of Mississippi

Legal offices
Preceded by Chuck McRae	Associate Justice of the Supreme Court of Mississippi; 2004–2017	Succeeded by David M. Ishee
