= David M. Ishee =

American judge (born 1963)

David Ishee

Associate Justice of the Mississippi Supreme Court
- Incumbent
- Assumed office September 18, 2017
- Appointed by: Phil Bryant
- Preceded by: Jess H. Dickinson

Personal details
- Born: 1963 (age 62–63) Gulfport, Mississippi, U.S.
- Relatives: Roger Ishee (father)
- Education: University of Southern Mississippi (BS); University of Mississippi (JD)

David M. Ishee (born 1963) is an associate justice of the Supreme Court of Mississippi.

== Biography ==
Ishee was born in Gulfport, Mississippi, in 1963. He received his Bachelor of Science from the University of Southern Mississippi in 1985 and his Juris Doctor from the University of Mississippi School of Law after studying at the University of London.

After graduation he entered private law practice with his late father-in-law, Elmo Lang of Pascagoula, Mississippi. He practiced for almost 14 years in the law firm of Lang and Ishee. During that time, he was involved in extensive litigation in civil, criminal, and domestic-relations law.

=== State court service ===
In 1993, at the age of 29, he was appointed municipal court judge for the City of Pascagoula. He was the youngest municipal court judge in the state of Mississippi. He was re-appointed for a second term in 1996. During this time, he also served one year as interim Municipal Court Judge for the City of Ocean Springs, and was Judge Pro Tem for the Jackson County Youth Court. Upon returning to Gulfport, Ishee was appointed Municipal Court Judge for the City of Gulfport in October 1999. He joined the law firm of Franke, Rainey and Salloum, PLLC, in 2002. He also served for two years as adjunct professor at Mississippi Gulf Coast Community College, teaching torts and personal injury law. In April 2004, Ishee was appointed Senior Municipal Court Judge for the City of Gulfport.

=== Mississippi Court of Appeals ===
In September 2004, Ishee was appointed to the Mississippi Court of Appeals by Governor Haley Barbour. He was appointed by the chief justice of the Mississippi Supreme Court to chair the Criminal Section of the Model Jury Instructions Revision Committee, which revised the Criminal Model Jury Instructions for the Circuit Courts of Mississippi.

=== Supreme Court of Mississippi ===
Ishee was appointed to the Mississippi Supreme Court by Governor Phil Bryant to replace former Justice Jess H. Dickinson. He took the oath of office on September 18, 2017.

== Personal ==
Ishee is married to the former Linda Lang of Pascagoula. They have one daughter, Lauren. Justice Ishee is the son of Mrs. Doris Ishee of Gulfport and the late Representative Roger Ishee.

Legal offices
Preceded by Jess H. Dickinson	Associate Justice of the Supreme Court of Mississippi; 2017–present	Incumbent
