= Troy Municipal Airport =

Airport in Pike County, Alabama

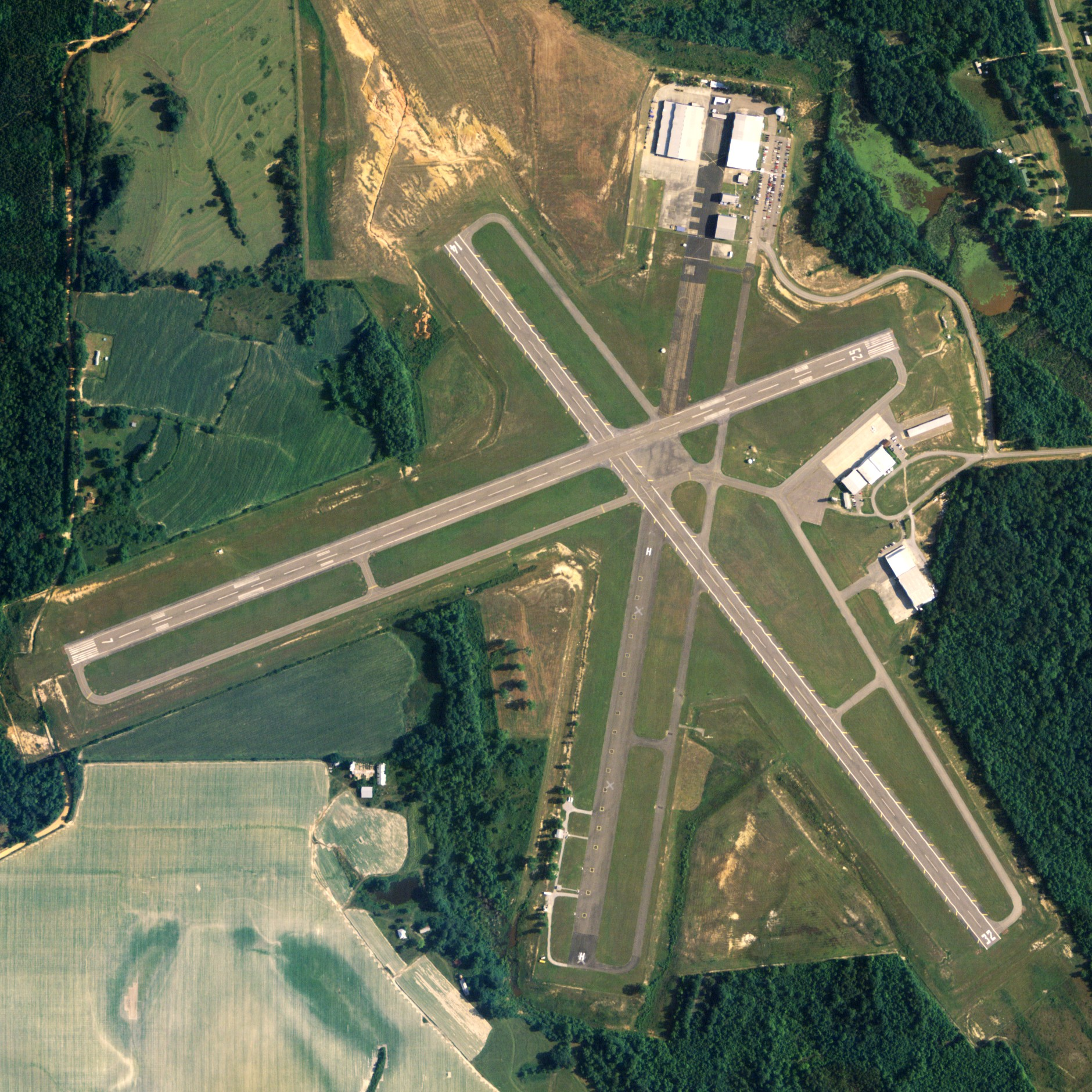
- NAIP aerial image, 2006
- IATA: TOI; ICAO: KTOI; FAA LID: TOI

Summary
- Airport type: Public
- Owner: City of Troy
- Serves: Troy, Alabama
- Elevation AMSL: 398 ft (121 m)
- Coordinates: 31°51′38″N 86°00′44″W

Map
- Location of airport in Alabama TOI (the United States)

Runways
Direction	Length		Surface
Direction	ft	m	Surface
7/25	6,197	1,527	Asphalt
14/32	5,024	1,531	Asphalt

Statistics (2010)
- Aircraft operations: 69,088
- Based aircraft: 39
- Source: Federal Aviation Administration

Troy Municipal Airport (IATA: TOI, ICAO: KTOI, FAA LID: TOI) is a city-owned public-use airport located four nautical miles (4.6 mi; 7.4 km) northwest of the central business district of Troy, a city in Pike County, Alabama, United States. It is included in the FAA's National Plan of Integrated Airport Systems for 2011–2015, which categorized it as a general aviation facility.

== History ==
It was activated on 11 January 1942 as Troy Auxiliary Airfield, a satellite airfield for the United States Army Air Forces Maxwell Field near Montgomery. It was known as Maxwell AAF Aux No. 4 - Troy (aka Troy No. 5).

The airfield also conducted basic flying training throughout the war. Flying training was performed with Fairchild PT-19s as the primary trainer. It also had several PT-17 Stearmans and a few P-40 Warhawks assigned. It was transferred as inactive to the US Army Corps of Engineers on 1 April 1946 with the drawdown of AAFTC's pilot training program.

The airfield was turned over to civil control through the War Assets Administration (WAA).

== Facilities and aircraft ==
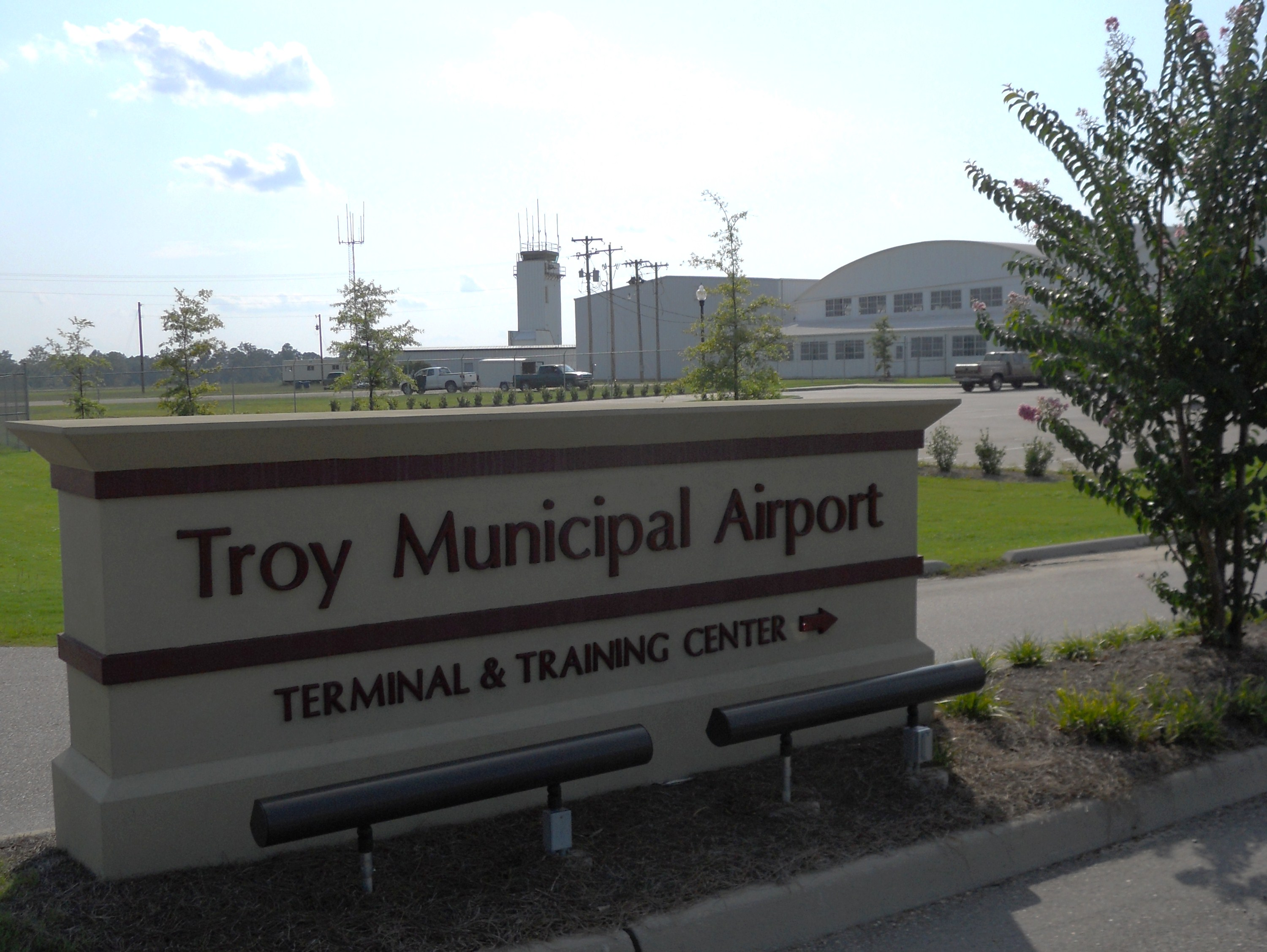
Main entrance to Troy Municipal Airport

Troy Municipal Airport covers an area of 501 acres (203 ha) at an elevation of 398 feet (121 m) above mean sea level. It has two asphalt-paved runways: 14/32 measuring 5,022 by 100 feet (1,531 by 30 meters) and 7/25 measuring 5,009 by 100 feet (1,527 by 30 meters). The tower and radar facilities are run by U.S. Army air traffic controllers. The airport is dominated by student pilots flying TH-67 helicopters from Fort Novosel between the times of 0800–1030L and 1400–1600L.

For the 12-month period ending August 3, 2010, the airport had 69,088 aircraft operations, an average of 189 per day: 59% general aviation and 41% military. At that time there were 39 aircraft based at this airport: 74% single-engine, 18% multi-engine and 8% jet.

== See also ==
- List of airports in Alabama
