= Alvin Ingram =

American orthopedic surgeon

Dr. Alvin J. Ingram
- Born: Alvin John Ingram; March 31, 1914; Jackson, Tennessee
- Died: June 1, 1999 (aged 85); Memphis, Tennessee
- Education: Union University
- Occupation: orthopaedic surgeon

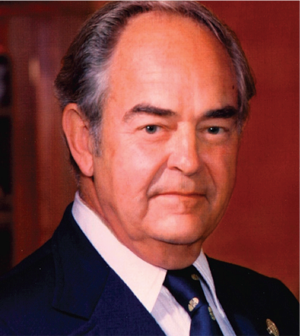
Dr. Alvin Ingram. Accomplished orthopaedic surgeon, leader in combatting polio, and one of the first doctors to administer penicillin.

Dr. Alvin John Ingram (March 31, 1914 – June 1, 1999) was a leader in orthopaedic surgery, pioneer in combatting polio, and one of the first doctors in history to administer penicillin. Ingram also was selected as the only orthopaedist in a group of physicians to tour military field hospitals in Vietnam at the request of Lyndon B. Johnson. Ingram served as president of numerous orthopaedic associations, including the American Orthopaedic Association (AOA), Pediatric Orthopaedic Society of North America (POSNA), the Orthopaedic Society, American Orthopaedic Association, and the American Board of Orthopaedic Surgery.

== Early life ==
Ingram was born on March 31, 1914, to Alvin Hill and Margaret (Gallagher) Ingram and raised in Jackson, Tennessee. His father, Alvin Hill, was a railroad conductor, who worked for the Illinois Central Railroad. He attended Union University in Jackson from 1932 to 1933 than received his Bachelor of Science degree from the University of Tennessee-Knoxville in 1939, for his MD degree (1939) and Master of Science in Orthopaedic Surgery (1948) Ingram attended the University of Tennessee, Memphis. After two fellowships at Campbell, he joined the staff in 1947 as a pediatric surgeon being promoted to chief of staff from 1969 to 1976, retiring in 1983.

== World War II service ==
Following the U.S. entry into World War II, Ingram joined the Army Medical Corps and was stationed at Billings General Hospital in Indianapolis, Indiana, from July 1 to September 1, 1942, and Bushnell General Hospital in Brigham, Utah, where he was among a select group of doctors to administer penicillin for the first time to U.S. patients.

During World War II, Bushnell Hospital treated approximately 13,000 military patients with various illnesses and injuries, and in 1944, it housed 3,286 GI–patients. The U.S. Army designated Bushnell Hospital as the military's first center for the study of penicillin’s possible use. On April 1, 1943, the first shipment of penicillin arrived at Bushnell, and during the War, it administered penicillin more than any other institution in the United States. In addition to administering some of the first doses of penicillin, Ingram promoted its use to the surrounding Brigham community. In speech by then-Captain Alvin Ingram to the Rotary Club of Brigham City, he explained how penicillin was discovered in 1928 by Alexander Fleming, and extolled recent successes of administering the drug at nearby Bushnell Hospital. According to historian Richard Polenberg, “[w]artime advances in medicine, particularly in the production of penicillin (which first became generally available for civilian use in the spring of 1944) saved countless [military and civilian] lives.

Colonel Robert M. Hardaway MD, commanding officer of Bushnell, participated in Ingram's wedding to Catherine Davis as her "father by proxy" since her father was unable to attend.

== Accomplishments and recognitions ==
In an interview with incoming president of the American Academy of Orthopaedic Surgeons (AAOS), James H. Beaty listed Ingram as one of his inspirational mentors, noting that "[w]ithin medicine, I’ve had several significant role models and mentors. Alvin J. Ingram, MD—a pediatric orthopaedic surgeon who was Chief of Staff at the Campbell Clinic—was one. Ingram was a great role model, and was very active in orthopaedic organizations, serving as president of the American Orthopaedic Association (AOA) and the Pediatric Orthopaedic Society of North America (POSNA)."

- Member of staff, Campbell Clinic, Memphis, TN (1947–1990)
- Deputy chief of staff, Campbell Clinic, Memphis, TN (1967–1969)
- Chief of staff, Campbell Clinic, Memphis, TN (1970–1978)
- Medical director (1948–1961) and chief of staff (1961–1970), Crippled Children's Hospital
- Medical director, Les Passes Cerebral Palsy Treatment Center (1953–1956)
- Medical advisory committee (1947–1957) and chairman (1947–1955), Memphis and West Tennessee Chapter, Nations Foundation of Infantile Paralysis
- Medical advisory committee, Shrine School for Crippled Children (1947–1956)
- Medical advisory board, Variety Club Convalescent Hospital (1952–1956)
- Secretary-treasurer, member of the board of trustees, and secretary of the board of trustees of the American Medical Association (AMA). Chairman of the Liaison Committee between the AMA and National Medical Association, AMA Representative to the Interagency Committee on Increasing Enrollment of Blacks and Other Minority Students in Medicine, and member of the finance committee of the AMA Board of trustees (1968–1970).
- Member, executive committee of the medical staff of Baptist Memorial Hospital (1969–1970)
- Chairman, department of orthopedics, Baptist Memorial Hospital (1970- )
- Distinguished Service Alumni Award, Union University, Jackson, TN (January, 1970)
- Distinguished Southern Orthopaedist Award, Southern Orthopaedic Association (SOA) (1989)
- Pioneer/Distinguished Achievement Award, Pediatric Orthopaedic Society of North America (POSNA) (1990)
- Distinguished Alumni Award, University of Tennessee (1997)
- Hall of Fame, Pediatric Orthopaedic Society of North America (POSNA) (2019)
- Member, board of trustees – Le Bonheur Children's Hospital – Memphis, TN
- Member, board of trustees – National Association of the Blue Cross Plans

== Pediatric Orthopaedic Society of North America Video Interview ==
- Alvin Ingram Interview – 1990 Pioneer Award from the Pediatric Orthopaedic Society of North America (POSNA): https://www.youtube.com/watch?v=U7bY_UYwgp8
