= Phi Kappa (secondary) =

American high school fraternity

- ΦΚ
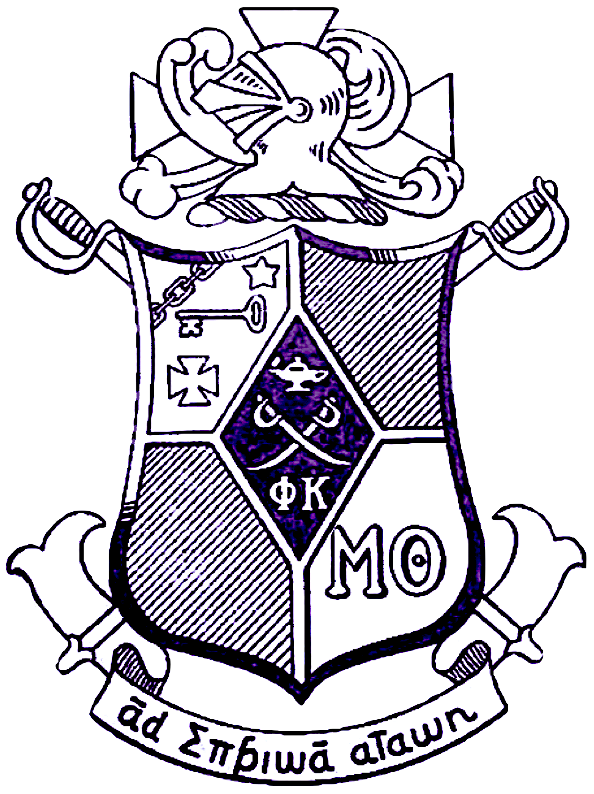
- Founded: 1918; 108 years ago Troy, Alabama
- Type: Social
- Affiliation: Independent
- Status: Active
- Emphasis: High School
- Scope: National
- Motto: ἀδελφική ἀγάπη "Brotherly Love"
- Pillars: Brotherhood, Scholarship, Community Service, and Faith in God
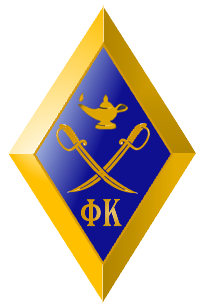
- Member badge

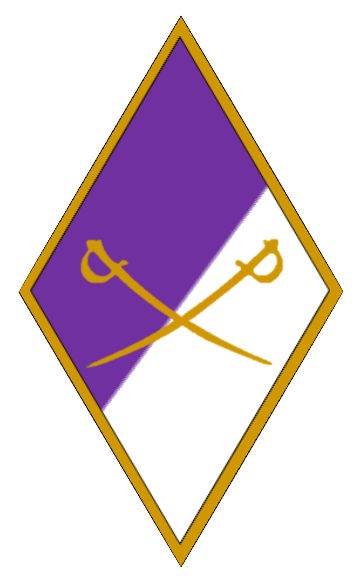
- Pledge pin
- Colors: Purple and White
- Symbol: Scimitar
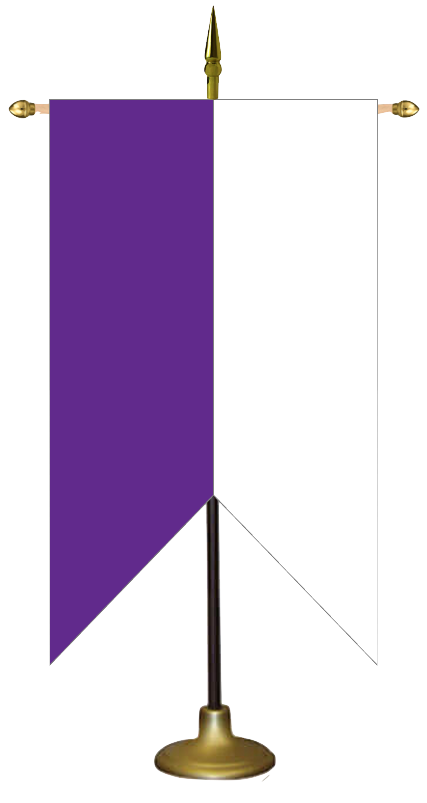
- Flag
- Flower: Camellia
- Jewel: Amethyst
- Publication: The Herald
- Philanthropy: St. Jude's Children's Research Hospital
- Chapters: 48 chartered; 9 active
- Headquarters: United States

Phi Kappa National Fraternity (ΦΚ) is a secondary school social fraternity. Since its founding in the early twentieth century, Phi Kappa has chartered nearly fifty chapters in eight states in the Deep South. No chapters of the fraternity have ever been chartered outside of the American South, making Phi Kappa the oldest and largest exclusively Southern Greek-letter social fraternity, serving secondary schools.

== History ==
=== Founding and First Chapter ===
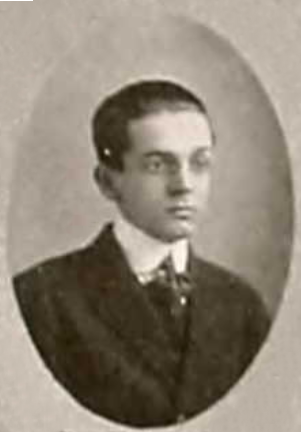
Jacob Broughton Nelson, the founder of Phi Kappa, in 1915

The exact origins of Phi Kappa are somewhat unclear. According to fraternity tradition, Phi Kappa was founded on February 3, 1900, at Southern University Preparatory School in Greensboro, Alabama. However, no records confirm the fraternity’s presence at that institution, casting doubt on the official founding narrative.

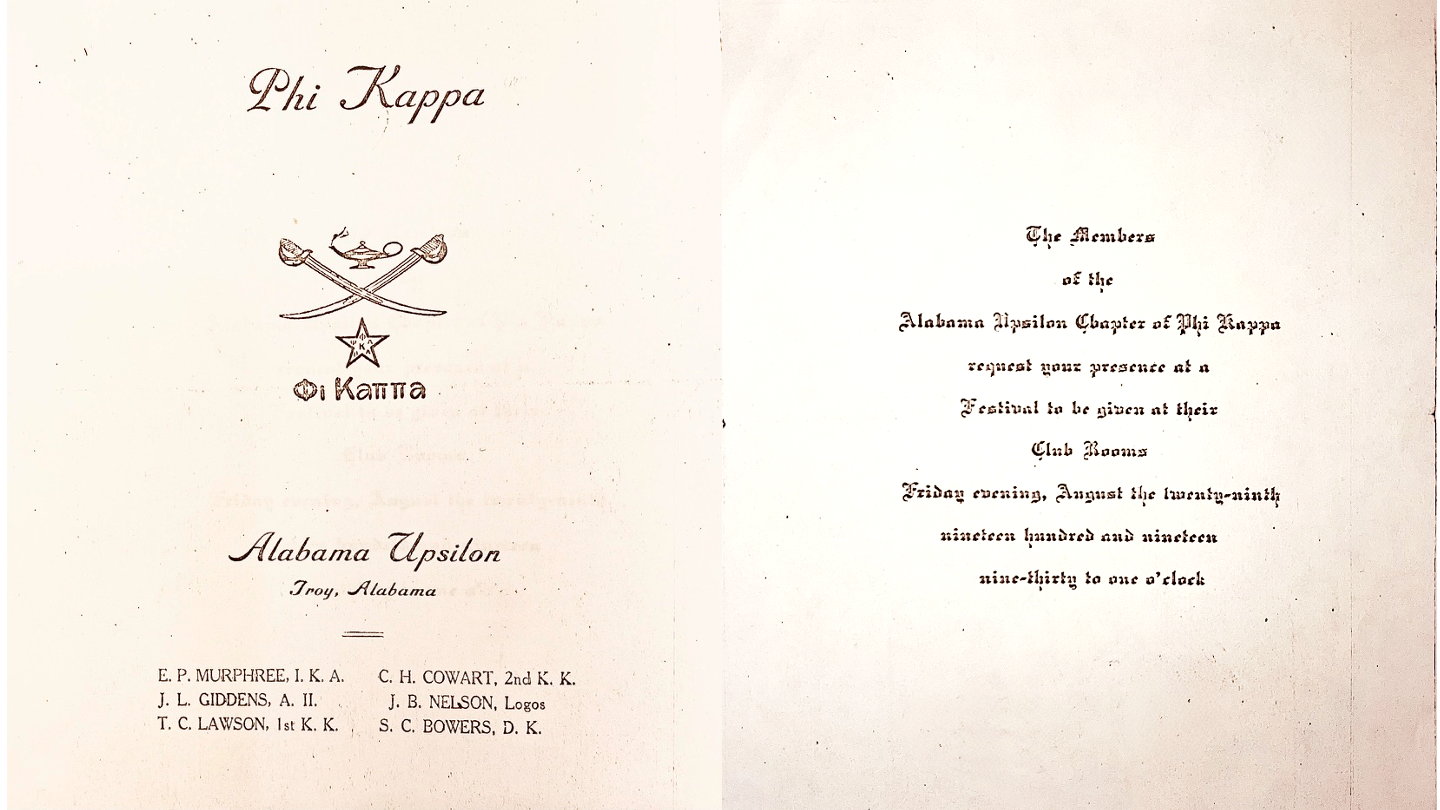
This invitation to a social function hosted by the Alabama Upsilon chapter is the earliest known document of Phi Kappa.

The earliest documented reference to Phi Kappa involves the Alabama Upsilon chapter in Troy, Alabama. Contemporary newspaper accounts from 1919 describe the chapter’s activities, including a banquet held on May 28, 1919. The event was hosted by Jacob Broughton Nelson, who had moved to Troy in June 1918 after attending Southern University in Greensboro, Alabama. Based on the available evidence, Nelson is believed to have actually founded Phi Kappa in Troy, Alabama in late 1918.

Early members of Phi Kappa referred to Nelson as the original leader of the Alabama Upsilon chapter and credited him with creating the fraternity. Nelson is recognized by the organization as its singular founder.

The Alabama Upsilon chapter functioned primarily as a social club for young men. Members were from Troy as well as from nearby communities. Most members were high school age, but membership in the chapter was not restricted to high school students and some members were college students and young professionals. By early 1919, the group occupied two rooms above the Brantley Bros. Mercantile Co. store on Troy’s courthouse square—one room was used for meetings and initiations and the other for social gatherings.

A surviving invitation printed by the Alabama Upsilon chapter in August 1919 lists the fraternity's officers at that time. The officers and their titles were:

- Edwin Porter Murphree, I.K.A.
- Jack Lawrence Giddens, A.II. (or A.Π.)
- Thomas Clifford Lawson, 1st K.K.
- Clarence Heath Cowart, 2nd K.K.
- Nelson, Logos
- Sam Carroll Bowers, D.K.

Nelson had stepped down from his leadership role in Phi Kappa during the summer of 1919, reportedly due to his increased involvement with the local Masonic lodge.

In late September 1919, Nelson left Troy. After his move, Nelson had no further contact with the fraternity. He never returned to Alabama and his fate remains a mystery.

=== Mu Theta chapter ===
Shortly before Nelson’s departure from Troy, a group of four Alabama Upsilon chapter members led by Heath Cowart, who were students at the Gulf Coast Military Academy (GCMA) near Gulfport, Mississippi, established a second chapter of Phi Kappa at that institution. On September 15, 1919, the GCMA chapter was chartered by Nelson of Alabama Upsilon. Cowart requested from Nelson that the chapter be designated as Mu Theta, with Mu signifying Mississippi.

The chapter founders of Mu Theta were Clarence Heath Cowart, Jr., John Oscar "Jack" Hain, Jr., Flavius Josephus "Joe" Hendley, and William Fitzhugh Palmer. During their first chapter meeting, the Mu Theta chapter initiated two new members: Clarence Quarles Graham and Cecil Fountaine Shuptrine. These six are considered the charter members of Mu Theta.

The first officers of Mu Theta were:

- Cowart, I.K.A. (President)
- Palmer, K.K. (Vice President)
- Hain, K.A. (Secretary)
- Graham, L. (Treasurer)

At the time that Mu Theta was established, four other secondary fraternities had active chapters on the GCMA campus. Their presence likely influenced the early Mu Theta members as they worked to improve Phi Kappa's organizational structure and symbols. During Mu Theta's first year, the members redesigned Phi Kappa's coat of arms and adopted a public motto for the fraternity: ἀδελφική ἀγάπη (pronounced ah-del-fee-KAY ah-GAH-pay), a Greek phrase which means "brotherly love," transforming Phi Kappa from a social club into a more traditional Greek-letter social fraternity.

By May of 1920, near the end of its first academic year at GCMA, the Mu Theta chapter had grown to 17 members. Cowart and Palmer arranged for membership badges to be made by the same Gulfport jeweler who supplied badges for the other fraternities at GCMA. The new badges were diamond-shaped, differing from the original square design used by the Upsilon chapter. The diamond shape became the standard for Phi Kappa badges.

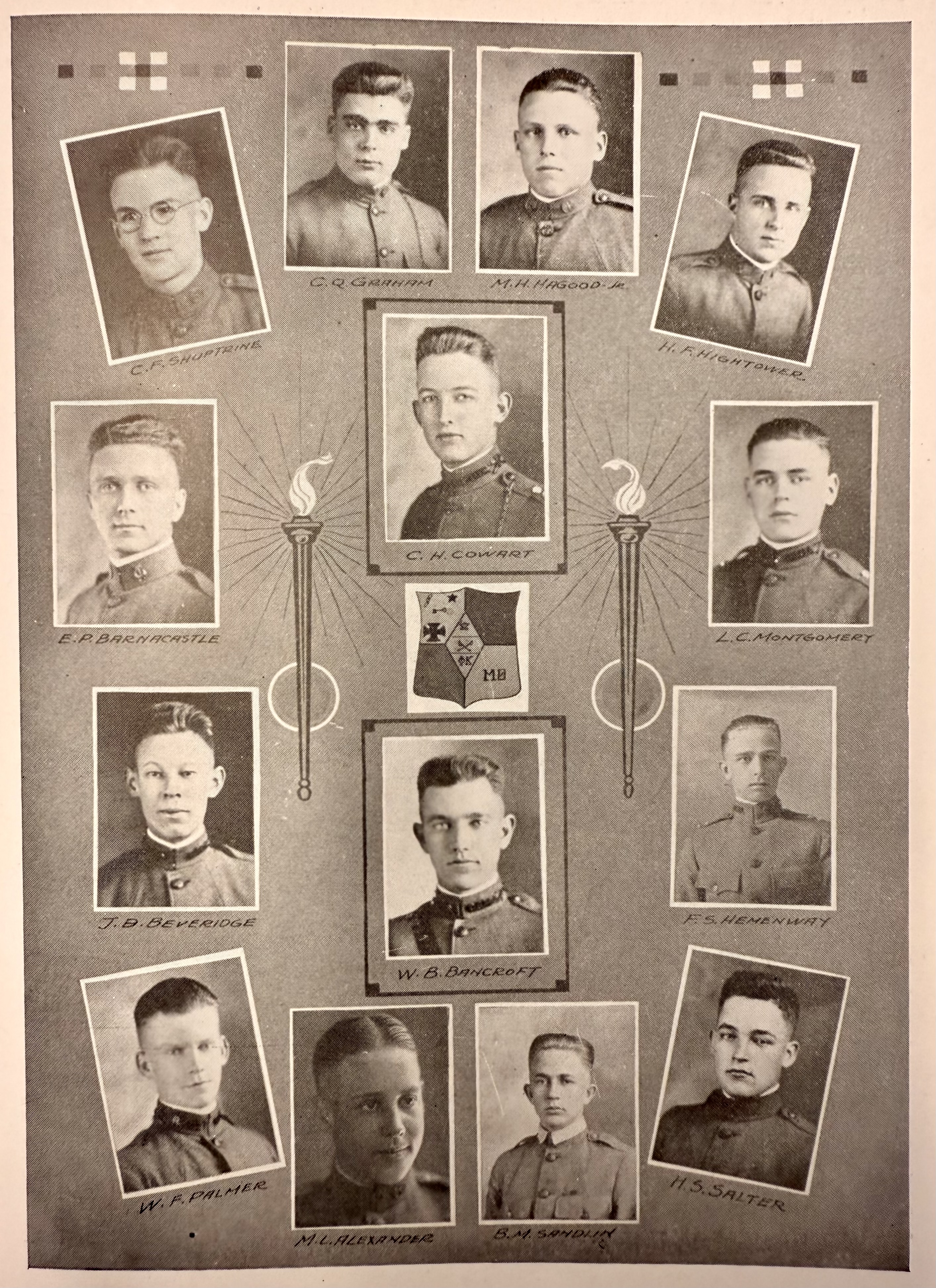
The first Mu Theta chapter composite was published in the 1920 edition of GCMA’s Conch Shell yearbook. Two of the chapter’s founders, Hain and Hendley, were not pictured, as they did not return for the spring semester.

=== National expansion ===
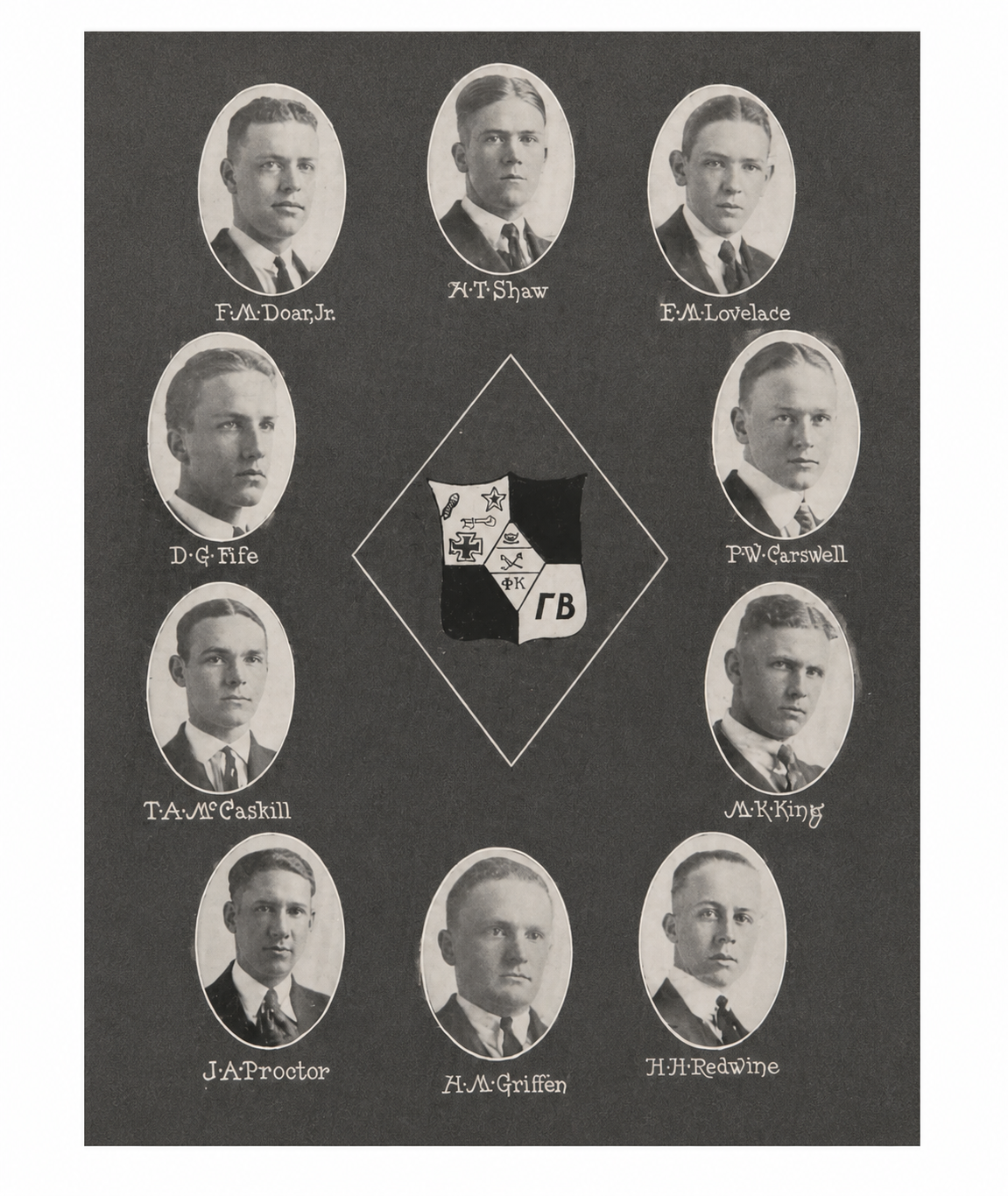
Charter members of the Gamma Beta chapter of Phi Kappa at Emory University Academy in 1921. The composite’s coat of arms displays the chapter's letters (Gamma Beta) in place of Mu Theta. This was before the arms were standardized for all chapters.

Phi Kappa expanded nationally beginning in January 1921, when Mu Theta alumnus John Bruce Beveridge founded the Gamma Beta chapter at Emory University Academy in Oxford, Georgia. Over the next six years, Phi Kappa continued to expand as Mu Theta members and alumni established chapters in their hometowns. These new chapters were not chartered at particular schools, but, like the original Alabama Upsilon chapter, they were chartered for towns and cities. Early members of the new chapters were predominantly high school students, but membership was also open to college students and young professionals. Between 1922 and 1927, the fraternity chartered six additional chapters through the direct efforts of Mu Theta members:

- Beta – Memphis, Tennessee (1922)
- Lambda – Mobile, Alabama (1923)
- Delta – Laurel, Mississippi (1924)
- Epsilon – Birmingham, Alabama (1925)
- Zeta – Jackson, Tennessee (1927)
- Eta – Monroe, Louisiana (1927)

Due to its role in shaping and expanding the fraternity, Mu Theta earned the affectionate title "Mother Mu Theta." The Mu Theta chapter is honored by having its chapter letters prominently displayed on the fraternity’s coat of arms.

=== Early governance and conventions ===
In its early years, Phi Kappa operated under a mother chapter model, in which one chapter functioned as the national authority. From 1921 to 1924, Mu Theta served in this role, followed by Lambda chapter from 1924 to 1925. During this period, the officers of the mother chapter also acted as de facto national officers for the fraternity. C. Heath Cowart (founder of the Mu Theta chapter in 1919) also remained active with the national fraternity and held the title of "National I.K.A." until 1927.

The fraternity’s first national gathering occurred in 1924, hosted by Mu Theta in Gulfport, Mississippi, with representatives from Lambda and Delta chapters in attendance. Representatives from the different chapters convened for a second time from December 26–28, 1925, in Birmingham, Alabama with the Epsilon chapter serving as host. At this meeting, Lambda’s H. Jamin Gordon was elected Exalted Grand Master (national president) and Winston Groom, Exalted Scribe (national secretary). The third convention was held in Mobile, Alabama, from October 8–10, 1926, commemorating Lambda’s three-year anniversary.

At the fourth national convention, held July 10–12, 1927, in Memphis, Tennessee, delegates created a new governing structure called the Executive Council. The council consisted of all active chapters' Grand Masters and was led by three alumni members elected by convention delegates. The first Executive Council officers were:

- James T. Overbey (Lambda), Exalted Grand Master
- Frank Bunch (Beta), Exalted Worthy Master
- Winston F. Groom (Lambda), Exalted Grand Scribe

The number of Executive Council officers was increased to five at the 1929 convention in Meridian, Mississippi. J. W. Blanchard (Eta) was elected as the first Exalted Grand Treasurer and Eugene Williams (Delta Chi) was elected the first Recording Secretary.

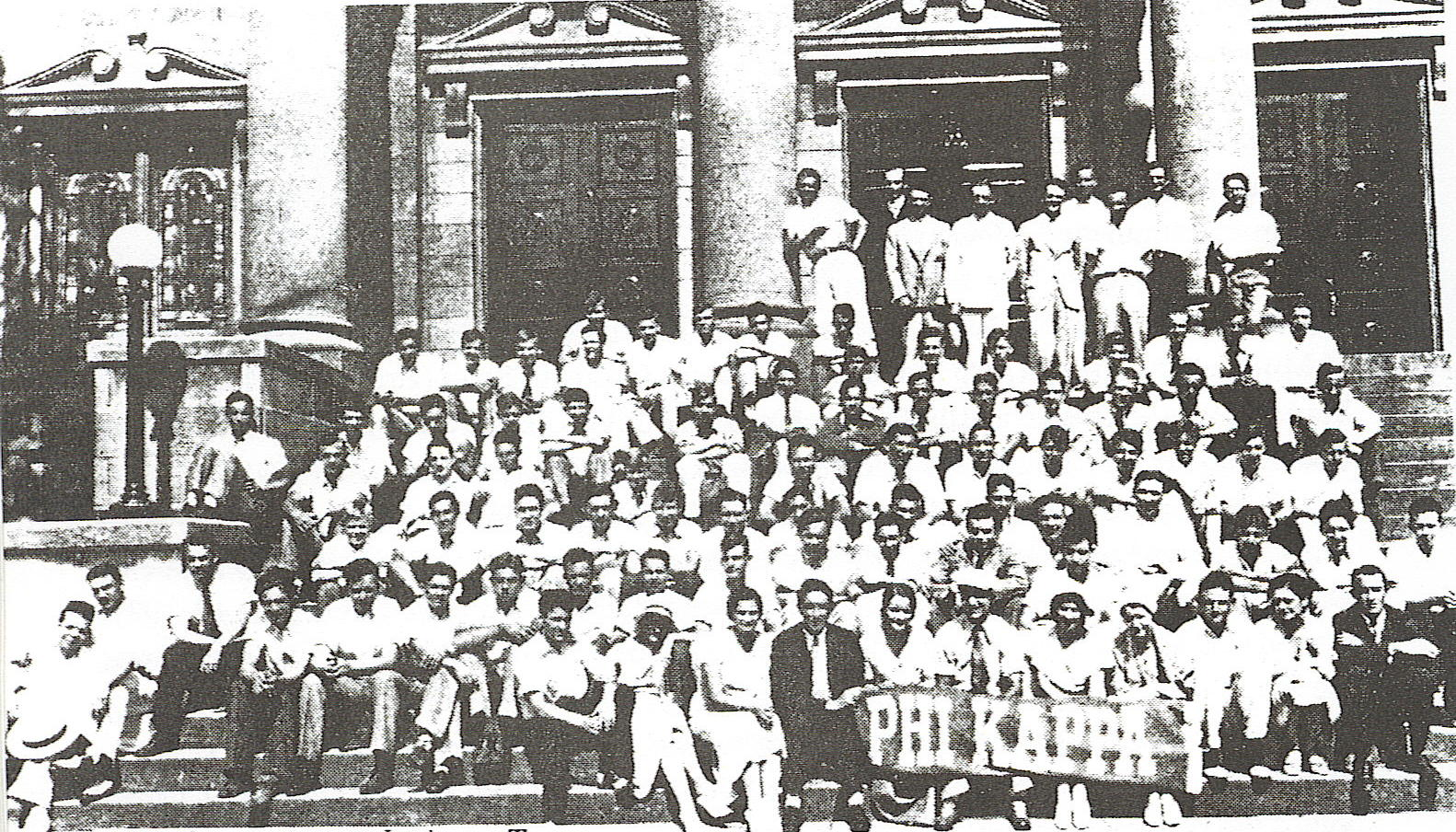
Attendees of Phi Kappa's eighth national convention, held June 8 through 10, 1931, in Jackson, Tennessee. The group is gathered on the steps of Jackson's First United Methodist Church.

The eighth national convention, held June 8–10, 1931, in Jackson, Tennessee, marked another significant milestone. During this meeting, Phi Kappa adopted a new constitution and bylaws, expanded the Executive Council to seven officers, and elected Mildred Cobb of Monroe, Louisiana, as the fraternity’s first National Sweetheart.

=== Later history ===
Phi Kappa was incorporated in the state of Delaware in 1943 under the leadership of alumnus Guy D. Campbell of the Delta chapter, a former Exalted Grand Master (national president). The fraternity was likely incorporated under the name "Phi Kappa National Fraternity" to differentiate it from the unrelated collegiate fraternity Phi Kappa, which later merged with Theta Kappa Phi to form Phi Kappa Theta.

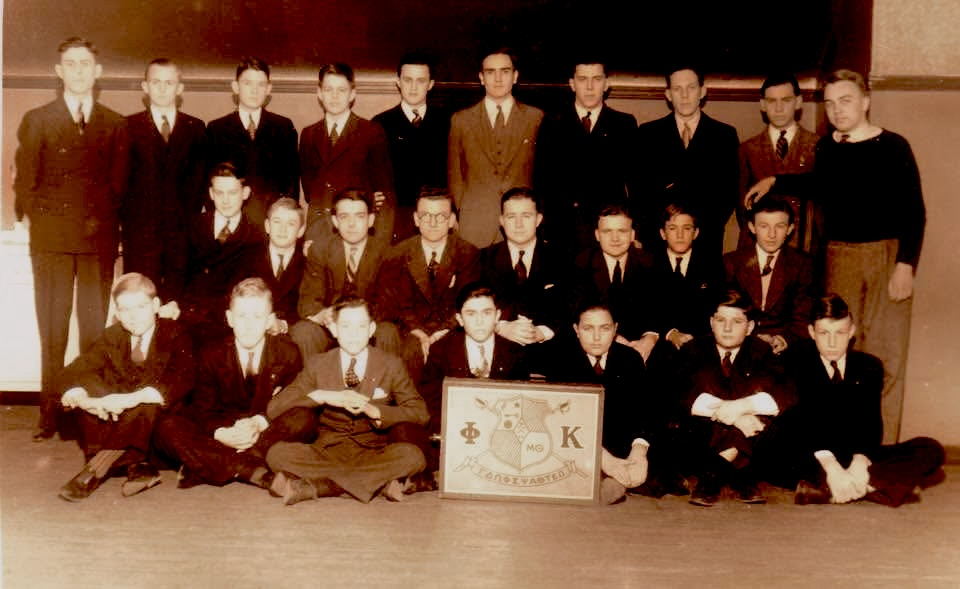
Members of Phi Kappa's Beta chapter (Memphis, Tenn.) in 1932.

Although Phi Kappa chartered nearly 50 chapters and initiated over 10,000 members during its peak, only about ten chapters remained active into the 21st century.^{12} By 2005, the fraternity had contracted significantly, with active chapters limited to a small number of cities in southern Mississippi.

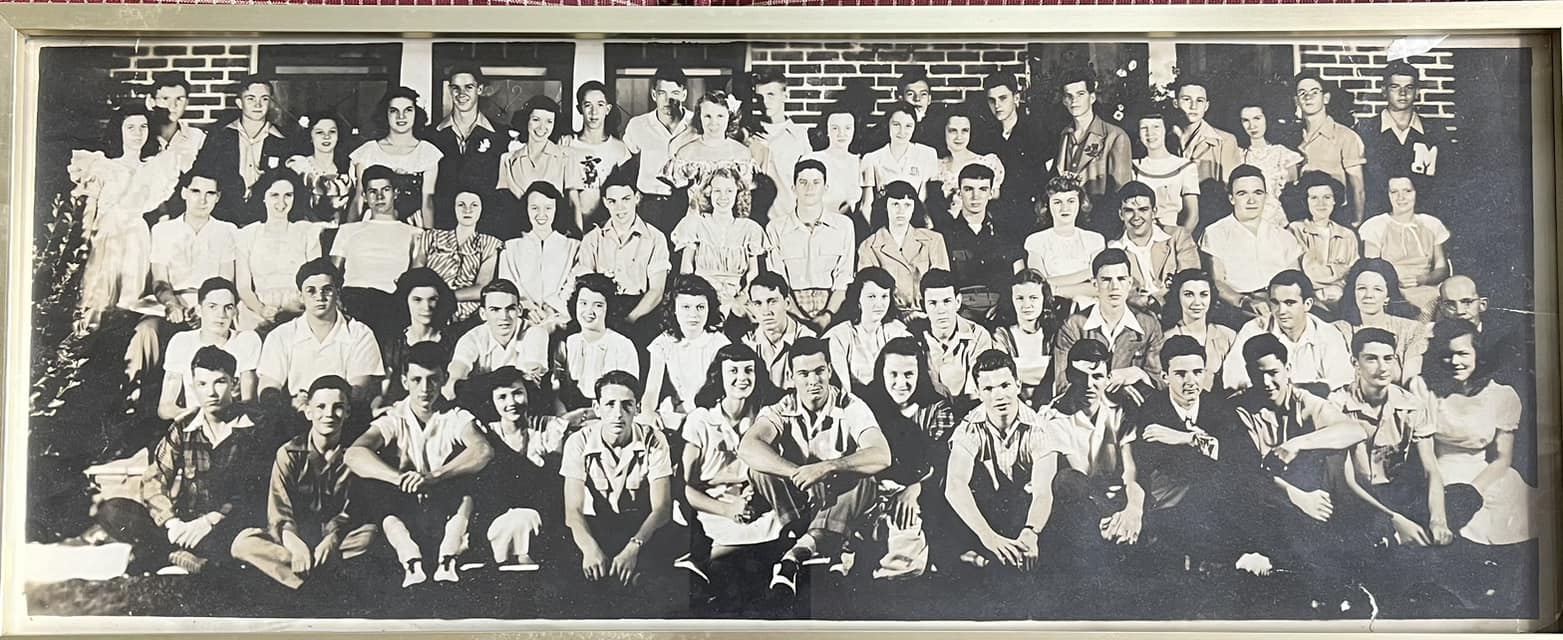
Members of Phi Kappa's Delta Chi chapter (Meridian, Miss.) pictured with their dates and chaperones at a social gathering in 1946.

A brief effort to reorganize and expand began in 2007, including the re-chartering of the Alpha Omega chapter in New Orleans. However, the chapter struggled to recruit new members and became inactive again by 2009.

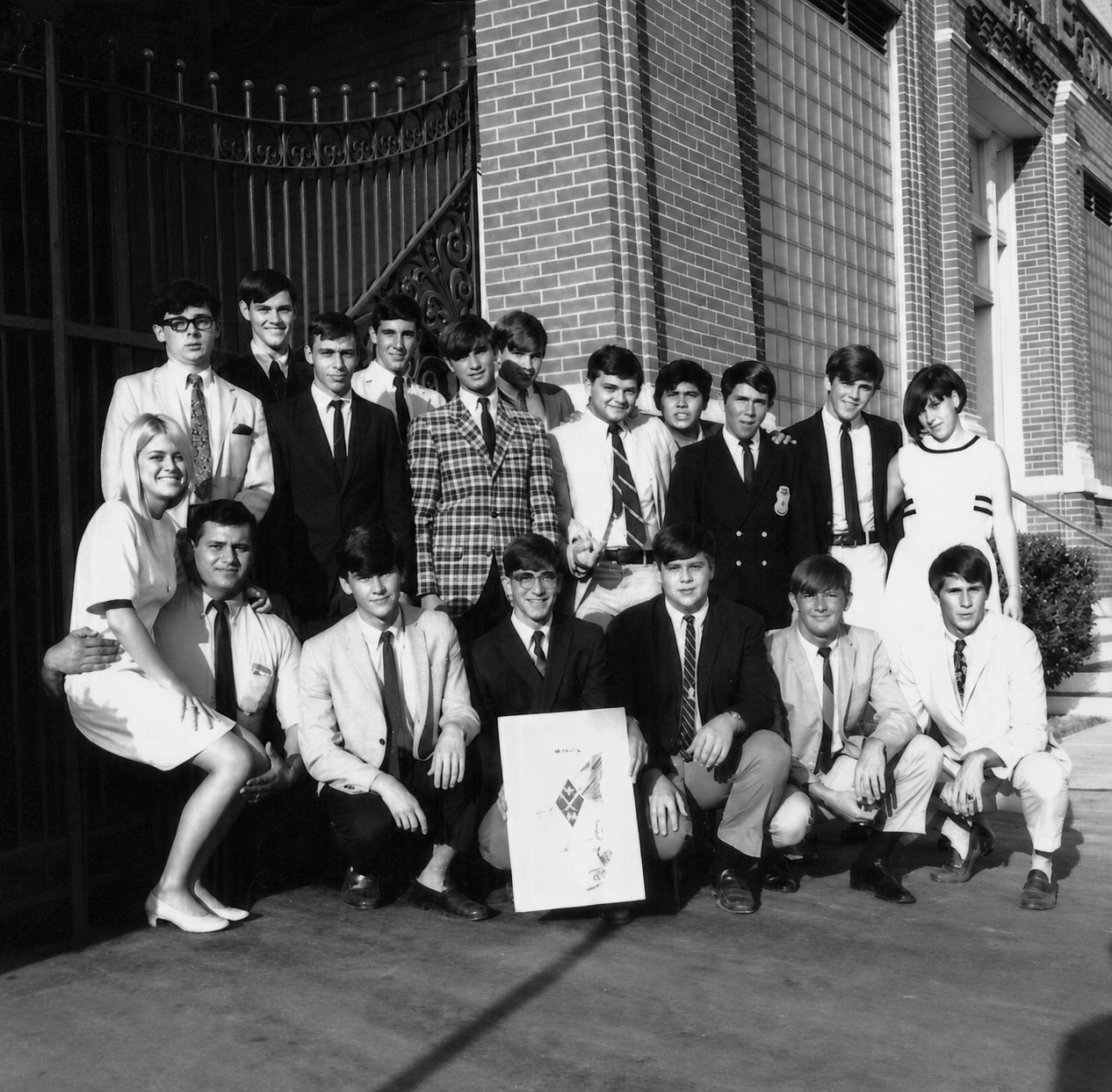
Members and sponsors of Phi Kappa's Alpha Omega chapter at the gate of the Dixie Brewery in New Orleans in 1966.

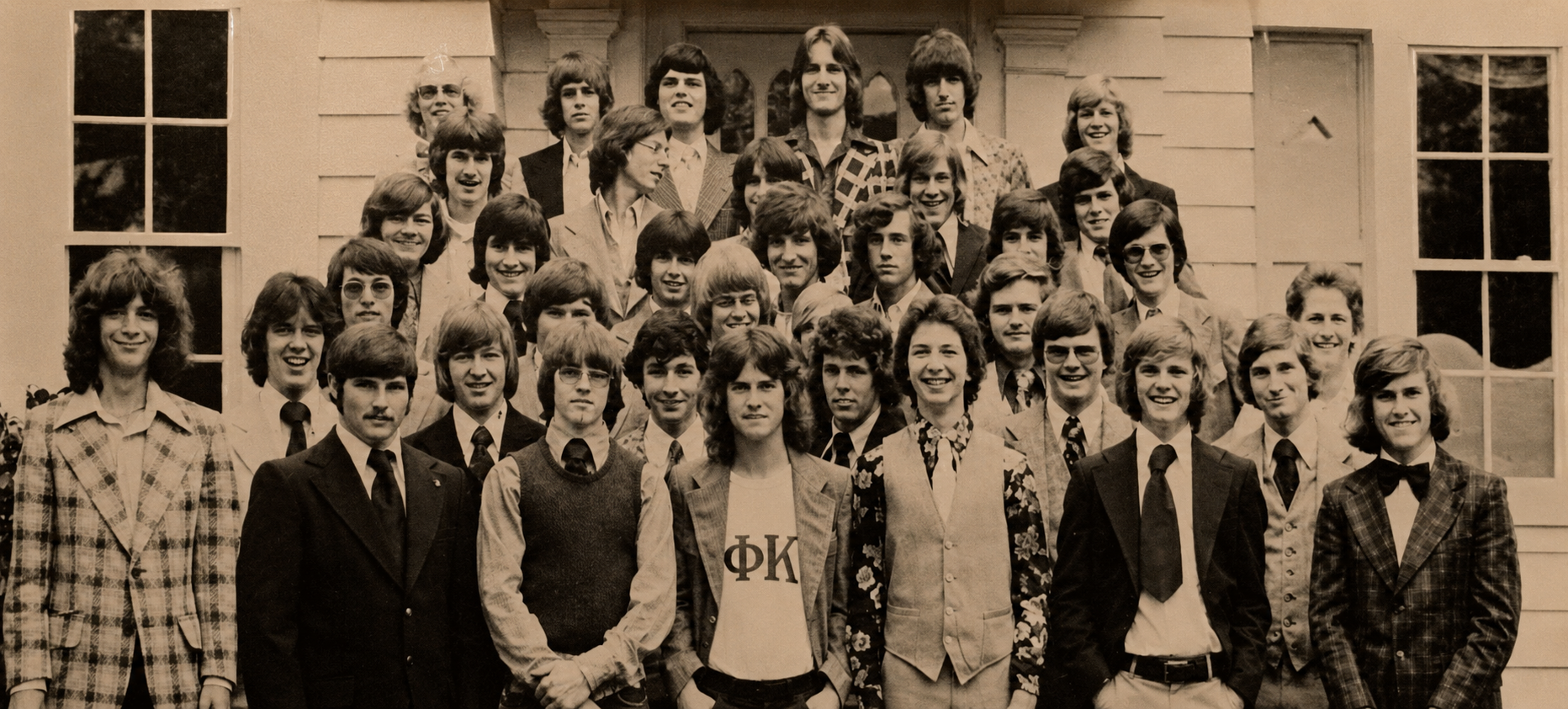
Members of Phi Kappa's Theta Gamma chapter (Gulfport, Miss.) in 1974.

The fraternity suffered a major setback in 2005 when Hurricane Katrina struck the Mississippi Gulf Coast, the region where most of the remaining active chapters were located. The storm destroyed a significant portion of Phi Kappa’s national records, archives, and historical memorabilia. Following the hurricane, widespread school closures and student evacuations contributed to long-term chapter inactivity. Many chapters never fully recovered and remain dormant.

== Symbols ==
=== Badge ===
The fraternity's badge is a rhombus, or diamond, of gold, enameled in Nazarene blue, displaying the following symbols in gold: an inflamed Greek lamp at the apex, two crossed scimitars, points down, in the center, and the capital Greek letters ΦΚ at the base. The badge is usually about 3/4" tall in size and it may be ornamented with precious or semi-precious stones. The badge may be worn only by a fully initiated member of the fraternity, a chapter honoree, the mother of a member, or the sweetheart of a member.

Some early badges were enameled in black instead of Nazarene blue. It is not known if black was the original color for the badge or if this was due to a temporary unavailability of blue enamel. Many badges produced in the 1930s and 1940s were bordered with pearls and rubies.

The original badge used by the Alabama Upsilon chapter was square in shape, worn with the angle up, and bearing the same symbols as the current badge. When the Mu Theta chapter first ordered badges from a local jeweler in Gulfport, the jeweler created the badges in a rhombus shape instead of a square. This became the standard for all future Phi Kappa badges.

Officially (according to the fraternity’s constitution and by-laws), the guard is a small pin in the shape of a scimitar, made of gold. On the blade of the scimitar, the Greek letter(s) of the member's chapter are displayed in pretense. The scimitar shaped pin, however, stopped being produced by the fraternity’s jewelers in the 1930s and members were offered, instead, the option to order a traditional guard pin of the member’s chapter letter(s) in gold.

The guard may be worn attached to the badge by a small chain, or, if worn alone, it may be worn as a lapel pin.

=== Coat of arms ===
Phi Kappa's coat-of-arms consists of an escutcheon, or shield, with a two engrailed top, hollowed sides, and a French style base. The escutcheon is quartered with the first and fourth fields argent (or white) and the second and third fields purpure (purple). The symbols on the shield are all displayed in white and outlined in purple. In the first quarter appear links of chain, a five-pointed star, a key, and a cross pattée. In the fourth quarter, the capital Greek letters ΜΘ are displayed. At the center is an inescutcheon of purple in the shape of, and displaying the symbols of, the badge of the fraternity.

Behind the shield are two crossed military sabers in scabbards, points down. Above the shield is the crest: a cross patteé of white surmounted by a plumed squire's helmet in profile, all resting on a wreath of the fraternity colors, purple and white. Beneath the shield, a white scroll bears the fraternity's open motto. The motto is displayed in lower-case Koine Greek, and translates to "brotherly love."

=== Pledge pin ===
The pledge pin is a rhombus, divided per bend sinister (diagonally from viewer's upper right to lower left) purple and white. It is slightly smaller than the badge. Two crossed scimitars as on the badge are displayed in pretense.

=== Flag ===
The flag of the fraternity is a swallowtail gonfalon in the fraternity's colors, purple and white.

=== Other emblems ===
The fraternity's colors are purple and white. The flower is the camellia (usually, though unofficially, the white camellia). The jewel of the fraternity, as adopted at the 1958 convention, is the amethyst.

=== Publications ===
National publications include The Herald, which is the national newsletter, and The Scimitar, a national yearbook. The Key, a publication that communicates necessary secret information for the fraternity, is published as needed. A pledge education guide called the Manual of Phi Kappa was first published in February 1958. In 1969, the name of the pledge manual was changed to The Nelson Dream.

== Activities ==
The primary activities of Phi Kappa chapters are community service projects and social activities that are fully planned and coordinated by fraternity members. Chapters also participate in the national fraternity's Community Service Project Day, a tradition started in 1971. Phi Kappa's major philanthropy is St. Jude's Children's Research Hospital in Memphis, Tennessee.

Besides a yearly national convention, the fraternity hosts a second annual gathering of chapters called Conclave. The annual Grand Masters' Retreat, first held in 1960, serves to sharpen the leadership skills and social ties between the officers of the various chapters. Founder's Day, a tradition begun in 1980, is recognized by local chapters on or near Jacob Broughton Nelson's birthday on July 31.

== Membership ==
Most Phi Kappa chapters are geographic in scope rather than institutional. In other words, they are chartered for a city or town and are not connected to, or recognized by, the public or private high schools that their members attend. However, two of Phi Kappa's earliest chapters were exceptions: Mu Theta chapter was an officially recognized student organization at the Gulf Coast Military Academy during its entire existence, and Gamma Beta chapter enjoyed a similar status at Emory University Academy for a short while before social fraternities were banned at the school.

As with collegiate fraternities, local chapters of Phi Kappa host rush parties for prospective members and extend membership bids to young men who are invited to become members. The pledging period usually lasts one academic semester. During this period, pledges learn about the fraternity's history, traditions, and governance, and become better acquainted with the active members. The importance of academics is stressed; pledges are expected to maintain a certain level of academic achievement during the pledge period. The fraternity forbids any hazing of pledges; all forms of mental and physical hazing were outlawed by the national fraternity in 1971.

After completion of the pledge period, candidates are initiated into the fraternity through a series of private ceremonies, known as rituals. These ceremonies are solemn in nature and serve to impress upon the candidate the principles and secrets of the fraternity. After initiation that, they become full and equal members of Phi Kappa.

== Governance ==
At the national level, Phi Kappa is led by alumni members who compose a governing body known as the executive council. Some of the executive council officers are elected by delegates of the fraternity who attend Phi Kappa's annual national convention. The elected members appoint other alumni to other positions on the council.

Local chapters are run by officers elected from the membership. The officers include a Grand Master (president), Worthy Master (vice president), Scribe (secretary), Treasurer, Pledge Master (pledge trainer), and a Sergeant-at-Arms who keeps order at meetings. Weekly chapter meetings are usually rotated between members' homes; although some chapters maintain a permanent meeting space. Regular and punctual attendance at chapter meetings is mandatory.

Each local chapter has at least one adult advisor, usually known as the "chapter parent". Most chapters have both a "chapter mom" and a "chapter dad.” These adult sponsors provide supervision and support to the chapter.

Chapters also elect at least one female “honoree” (often termed “little sister") from each grade at a local high school. One senior honoree is chosen each year to serve as the chapter's “Sweetheart”—an honorific title. Little Sisters and the Sweetheart attend the chapter's weekly meetings and assist the chapter in planning and executing social and charitable functions events. They may also attend national gatherings if the fraternity (i.e. Conventions and Conclaves). While most “little sisters” develop close ties with the members of the local chapter, they are not initiated into the fraternity.

== Chapters ==
The following is a list of all officially chartered chapters of Phi Kappa, in order of their establishment. Active chapters are indicated in bold. Inactive chapters and institutions are in italics.

| Chapter | Charter or Installation date and range | Institution | Location | Status | Ref. |
|---|---|---|---|---|---|
| Alabama Upsilon | c. 1918 – c. September 1919 | N/A | Troy, Alabama | Inactive | (Note: Also referred to in fraternity history as "Upsilon," the chapter became the target of harsh criticism by Dr. H. C. Threadgill (pastor of Troy’s Methodist congregation) in the late summer of 1919. The chapter folded soon after founder J. Broughton Nelson left Troy in late September of 1919.) |
| Mu Theta | September 15, 1919 – May 21, 1951 | Gulf Coast Military Academy | Near Gulfport, Mississippi | Inactive | (Note: The Mu Theta chapter died at the closure of Gulf Coast Military Academy’s senior division (which included grades 9 through 12). The final senior commencement was held on May 21, 1951. The GCMA senior division buildings and property were later purchased by the federal government.) |
| Gamma Beta | January 11, 1921 – c. 1924 | Emory University Academy | Oxford, Georgia | Inactive | (Note: After operating openly for only three semesters on the campus of Emory University Academy, Dr. Albert W. Rees became head of the academy in August of 1922 and immediately banned social fraternities. Despite the ban, the chapter continued operating sub rosa for another two years, but finally folded in 1924. Gamma Beta was the only Phi Kappa chapter ever established in Georgia.) |
| Beta | October 15, 1922 – xxxx? | N/A | Memphis, Tennessee | Inactive | |
| Lambda | October 10, 1923 – mid 1980s | N/A | Mobile, Alabama | Withdrawn from national fraternity | (Note: The "Lambda chapter" ceased cooperation with the national fraternity in the 1990s. The successors of the chapter, however, retained the name and ritual of Phi Kappa, and the group still operates as a local fraternity in the city.) |
| Delta | January 24, 1924 – c. 1927; July 26, 1930 – c. 2003 | N/A | Laurel, Mississippi | Inactive | |
| Epsilon | October 1925 – 1930; June 1966 – 1971 | N/A | Birmingham, Alabama | Inactive | (Note: The chapter became weak and its charter was withdrawn in 1930.) |
| Eta | June 17, 1927 – xxxx ? | N/A | Monroe, Louisiana | Inactive | |
| Theta | July 17, 1927 – xxxx ? | N/A | Hattiesburg, Mississippi | Inactive | |
| Zeta (See Chi Omega) | September 26, 1927 – June 8, 1941 | N/A | Jackson, Tennessee | Reissued | |
| **Delta Chi** | February 12, 1928 – 1946; October 26, 1958 | N/A | Meridian, Mississippi | Active | |
| Kappa | August 1929 – June 1933 | N/A | Alexandria, Louisiana | Inactive | (Note: The chapter's charter was revoked.) |
| Alpha Eta | March 1, 1931 – June 30, 1938 | N/A | Minden, Louisiana | Inactive | |
| Sigma | April 18, 1932 – June 8, 1941 | N/A | El Paso, Texas | Inactive | (Note: Sigma became an alumni chapter at the June 8, 1941 convention.) |
| Gamma (See Alpha Beta) | May 5, 1934 – c. February 1935 | N/A | Jackson, Mississippi | Inactive | |
| Alpha Beta (See Gamma) | May 19, 1939 – 1951 | N/A | Jackson, Mississippi | Inactive | |
| **Tau** (See Tau Gamma) | December 17, 1939 – 19xx ?; 1991 – 1996?; | N/A | Biloxi, Mississippi | Active | (Note: The Tau chapter was formed from a local social organization called the T. A. Club.) (Note: In 1995, the Tau Gamma chapter reverted to Tau, the name of the original Biloxi chapter.) |
| Chi (See Alpha Omega) | July 25, 1943 – 1947 | N/A | New Orleans, Louisiana | Inactive | |
| **Omega** | October 24, 1943 – xxxx ?; 2015 | N/A | Columbia, Mississippi | Active | |
| Kappa Alpha | March 19, 1944 – 1951 | N/A | Bastrop, Louisiana | Inactive | |
| Alpha Omega (See Chi) | December 14, 1947 – June 1952; May 1, 1953 – xxxx?; December 1, 2007 – 2009 | N/A | New Orleans, Louisiana | Inactive | |
| **Zeta (Second)** | September 9, 1954 | N/A | Marion, Arkansas | Active | |
| Theta Sigma | February 1955 – 1971 | N/A | Pensacola, Florida | Inactive | |
| Iota | February 1959 – June 1960 | N/A | Wiggins, Mississippi | Inactive | (Note: The chapter's charter was revoked.) |
| Delta Omega | December 22, 1962 - 1965 | N/A | Lafayette, Louisiana | Reissued | |
| **Alpha Iota** | July 2, 1967 | N/A | Covington, Louisiana | Active | |
| Chi Omega (See Zeta) | February 10, 1968 – xxxx ? | N/A | Jackson, Tennessee | Inactive | |
| Sigma Tau | February 10, 1968 – 19xx ?; February 22, 1992 – c. 2001 | N/A | Oxford, Mississippi | Inactive | |
| Theta Gamma | June 16, 1968 – c. 2005 | N/A | Gulfport, Mississippi | Inactive | |
| Delta Pi | June 16, 1968 – 1990 | N/A | Pascagoula, Mississippi | Inactive | (Note: The chapter's charter was revoked for inappropriate conduct.) |
| Theta Chi | 1969 – 1971 | N/A | Natchez, Mississippi | Reissued | |
| Xi | February 8, 1969 – xxxx ? | N/A | Paragould, Arkansas | Inactive | |
| Phi Tau | February 8, 1969 – xxxx ? | N/A | Tylertown, Mississippi | Inactive | |
| Zeta Chi | June 13, 1971 – xxxx ? | N/A | Lubbock, Texas | Inactive | |
| Beta Delta | February 13, 1972 – xxxx ? | N/A | Huntsville, Alabama | Inactive | |
| Delta Gamma | February 9, 1974 – xxxx ? | N/A | Long Beach, Mississippi | Inactive | |
| Delta Omega (Second) | 1975 - xxxx ? | N/A | Heidelberg, Mississippi | Inactive | |
| Beta Gamma | February 1976 – 1979 | N/A | Picayune, Mississippi | Inactive | |
| Alpha Chi | February 1978 – xxxx ? | N/A | Slidell, Louisiana | Inactive | |
| Sigma Gamma (See Zeta Gamma) | June 1979 – xxxx ? | N/A | Bay St. Louis, Mississippi | Inactive | |
| Delta Sigma | June 1982 – xxxx ? | N/A | Vicksburg, Mississippi | Inactive | |
| Theta Chi (Second) | June 1984 – xxxx ? | N/A | Collins, Mississippi | Inactive | |
| **Nu Gamma** | June 15, 1985 | N/A | Ocean Springs, Mississippi | Active | |
| Tau Gamma (See **Tau**) | June 1987 – 1991 | N/A | Biloxi, Mississippi | Reverted to original chapter designation | |
| Delta Nu | June 16, 1990 – xxxx ? | N/A | McComb, Mississippi | Inactive | |
| Zeta Gamma (See Sigma Gamma) | July 23, 1991–1992 | N/A | Bay St. Louis, Mississippi | Inactive | |
| Delta Omicron | July 23, 1991 – xxxx ? | N/A | Waynesboro, Mississippi | Inactive | |
| **Omega Tau** | 1997 | N/A | St. Martin, Mississippi | Active | |
| **Gamma Tau** | 1999 | N/A | Gautier, Mississippi | Active | |

== Alumni chapters ==
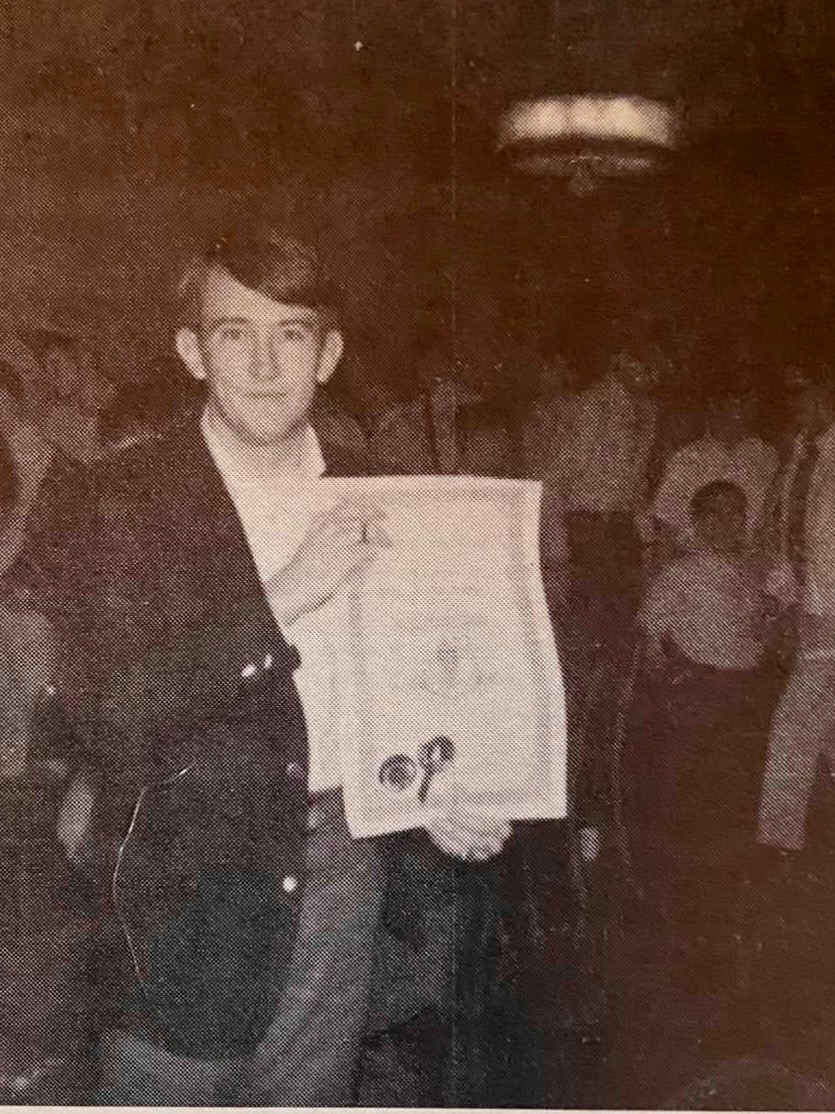
Brother Jim Slay (Delta Chi) displays the newly-issued charter for the Beta Triton alumni chapter (Meridian, Miss.) at the 1960 national convention.

In 1930, Phi Kappa alumni in Monroe, Louisiana organized a club to assist the local active chapter. Originally called the Weeping Willows Club, the name was later changed to the Phi Kappa Alumni Club. Though it did not seek a charter from the national fraternity, this was the first known alumni organization of Phi Kappa.

In 1941, the Sigma chapter in El Paso, Texas requested that their status be changed from an active chapter to an alumni chapter. Their request was granted, and Sigma became the fraternity's first officially recognized alumni chapter.

At the fraternity's 1958 convention, Phi Kappa established a system for chartering alumni chapters. Alumni chapters operating on a college campus would be designated by the suffix Deuteron after their chapter name, while those established in a town or city would carry the suffix Triton.

Following is a list of all officially chartered Phi Kappa alumni chapters.

| Chapter | Charter date and range | Institution | Location | Status | Ref. |
|---|---|---|---|---|---|
| Sigma | June 8, 1941 – 1942 | N/A | El Paso, Texas | Inactive | (Note: The Sigma high school chapter became an alumni chapter at the June 8, 1941 convention.) |
| Beta Deuteron | 1959 – 1960 | Mississippi Southern College | Hattiesburg, Mississippi | Inactive | |
| Alpha Triton | July 17, 1960 - xxxx ? | N/A | Columbia, Mississippi | Inactive | |
| Beta Triton | 1965 – xxxx ? | N/A | Meridian, Mississippi | Inactive | |
| Gamma Triton | 1965 – xxxx ? | N/A | Hattiesburg, Mississippi | Inactive | |
| Zeta Alpha Rho Rho Alpha Triton | 1973 – xxxx ? | N/A | Pascagoula, Mississippi | Inactive | |
| Gamma Theta Triton | Feb 9, 1974 – xxxx ? | N/A | Gulfport, Mississippi | Inactive | |
| Alpha Omega Triton | c. 1975 – xxxx ? | N/A | New Orleans, Louisiana | Inactive | |
| Delta Triton | 1975 – xxxx ? | N/A | Laurel, Mississippi | Inactive | |
| Alpha Gamma Triton | 1975 – xxxx ? | N/A | | Inactive | |
| Delta Chi Alpha Deuteron | 1976 – xxxx ? | Louisiana State University | Baton Rouge, Louisiana | Inactive | |
| Alpha Gamma Delta Triton | 1978 – xxxx ? | N/A | | Inactive | |
| Sigma Gamma Triton | 1980 – xxxx ? | N/A | | Inactive | |
| Theta Triton | 1989 – xxxx ? | N/A | | Inactive | |

== Notable members ==
This is a list of notable alumni of the Phi Kappa fraternity.

| Name | Chapter, Year of Initiation | Notability | Ref. |
|---|---|---|---|
| John Alexander | Delta Chi, 1938 | Internationally acclaimed operatic tenor with the Metropolitan Opera for over three decades | |
| Walter E. Arnold | Sigma, 1932 | Major general in the U.S. Air Force and senior Cold War strategist who served as military planning chief of staff for the Central Treaty Organization (CENTO) | |
| James O. E. Beck, Jr. | Beta, 1922 | Member of the Arkansas House of Representatives representing Crittenden County and in the Arkansas Senate for the 22nd district | |
| Bayard F. Berman | Mu Theta, 1938 | Civil-rights attorney and lead counsel in the landmark Los Angeles public school desegregation case, Crawford v. Los Angeles Board of Education | |
| Ulric B. Bray | Gamma Beta, 1922 | Industrial chemist and recipient of the Tolman Medal | |
| Cecil Brown | Delta Chi, 1959 | Member of the Mississippi House of Representatives for the 66th district and member of the Mississippi Public Service Commission | |
| Gil Carmichael | Omega, 1943 | Federal Railroad Administrator, two-time Mississippi gubernatorial nominee, and nationally influential advocate for intermodal transportation policy | |
| Porter W. Carswell | Gamma Beta, 1921 | Member of the Georgia House of Representatives and Georgia State Senate representing Burke County | |
| Winfield Dunn | Delta Chi, 1943 | Governor of Tennessee from 1971 to 1975 and a major figure in the Republican Party's rise to power in modern Tennessee politics | |
| James R. Eubank | Kappa, 1930 | Member of the Louisiana House of Representatives representing Rapides Parish | |
| James M. Fail | Lambda, 1943 | Financier and corporate turnaround executive who built and restructured businesses in banking, insurance, and industry | |
| Louis W. Fortenberry | Omega, 1950 | Member of the Mississippi State Senate representing Jackson County | |
| Rod Gilbreath | Delta, 1966 | Major League Baseball infielder who played six seasons with the Atlanta Braves | |
| Phil Gordon (born Phil H. Gulley) | Delta, 1937 | Television actor and Hollywood dialect coach best known for character roles and for coaching performers in Southern accents | |
| Kenny Griffis | Delta Chi, 1976 | Associate justice of the Supreme Court of Mississippi and former judge of the Mississippi Court of Appeals | |
| Jeffrey Guice | Tau, 1973 | Member of the Mississippi House of Representatives for the 114th district | |
| Mac Haik | Delta Chi, 1960 | NFL wide receiver for the Houston Oilers; later a prominent automobile and real estate entrepreneur | |
| Fred Haise | Tau, 1947 | NASA astronaut; lunar module pilot during the famed Apollo 13 mission; one of only 24 people to fly to the Moon | |
| William L. Halsey, Jr. | Mu Theta, 1935 | Influential Alabama industrial executive and civic leader inducted into the Alabama Business Hall of Fame | |
| Sam F. Hamra, Jr. | Mu Theta, 1945 | Attorney, restauranteur, and philanthropist who built one of the nation's largest privately held restaurant franchise organizations | |
| Jackie Hayes | Mu Theta, 1922 | Major League Baseball infielder for 14 seasons and a standout second baseman for the Washington Senators and Chicago White Sox | |
| Alvin Ingram | Zeta (original), 1928 | Pioneering orthopedic surgeon who developed groundbreaking surgical treatments for polio patients and one of the first doctors to administer penicillin to treat polio | |
| David M. Ishee | Theta Gamma, 1977 | Associate justice of the Supreme Court of Mississippi and former judge of the Mississippi Court of Appeals | |
| Paul B. Johnson, Jr. | Theta, 1931 | Governor of Mississippi during the height of the civil-rights era; previously lieutenant governor and a four-time gubernatorial candidate | |
| Clay Foster Lee, Jr. | Delta, 1944 | Bishop in the United Methodist Church | |
| Hal Malchow | Theta Gamma, 1968 | Pioneering political strategist whose use of voter data and microtargeting transformed modern American campaign tactics | |
| Forrest S. McCartney | Mu Theta, 1948 | Lieutenant general in the U.S. Air Force and director of the Kennedy Space Center during NASA's post-Challenger return-to-flight era | |
| Ed McGowin | Theta, 1953 | Painter and sculptor whose conceptual work has been exhibited and collected by major museums | |
| William E. McIntyre, Jr. | Mu Theta, 1938 | Member of the Mississippi State Senate representing Rankin and Smith counties | |
| Kinnaird R. McKee | Mu Theta, 1944 | Admiral in the U.S. Navy; superintendent of the United States Naval Academy; and director of the Naval Nuclear Propulsion Program | |
| Eric McNair | Delta Chi, 1929 | Ten-year Major League Baseball infielder and member of the Mississippi Sports Hall of Fame | |
| Fred Mitchell | Delta Chi, 1941 | Mid-century abstract expressionist painter associated with the New York School and the influential "9th Street Show" generation | |
| F. W. "Billy" Mitts | Mu Theta, 1933 | Member of the Mississippi State Senate representing Clarke and Jasper counties | |
| George A. Omas | Tau, 1955 | Chairman of the U.S. Postal Rate Commission, overseeing national postal-rate and regulatory policies | |
| Steven Palazzo | Theta Gamma, 1984 | U.S. representative from Mississippi's 4th congressional district from 2011 to 2023; member of the House Appropriations Committee | |
| Edwin L. Pittman | Theta, 1950 | Chief Justice of the Supreme Court of Mississippi; former state attorney general, secretary of state, and state treasurer; and brigadier general in the Mississippi National Guard | |
| Harry H. Redwine | Gamma Beta, 1921 | Member of the Georgia State Senate representing the Fayetteville district | |
| Jack Reed | Mu Theta, 1948 | Major League Baseball outfielder and member of two World Series championship teams with the New York Yankees | |
| Andy Reese | Mu Theta, 1922 | Major League Baseball infielder for the New York Giants and member of the Mississippi Sports Hall of Fame | |
| Jerome V. Reel, Jr. | Alpha Omega, 1953 | Historian, professor emeritus at Clemson University, and the university's first official historian | |
| William R. Rice | Zeta (original), 1933 | Member of the Tennessee Senate representing Madison County | |
| Tally D. Riddell | Delta Chi, 1934 | Member of the Mississippi State Senate representing Lauderdale County and later a member of the Mississippi Board of Trustees of Institutions of Higher Learning (IHL Board) from 1956-68; remembered for publicly breaking with Gov. Ross Barnett over racial extremism while a member of the IHL Board | |
| James D. Sparks | Eta, 1930 | Member of the Louisiana State Senate representing Ouachita Parish | |
| Sandy Steckler | Tau, 1954 | Member of the Mississippi State Senate representing Harrison County | |
| Jerry Stovall | Eta, 1955 | College Football Hall of Fame halfback; 1962 Heisman Trophy runner-up; unanimous 1962 All-American for the LSU Tigers; 2nd overall NFL draft pick and player for the St. Louis Cardinals; and later head football coach at LSU | |
| David P. Sullivan | Theta, 1983 | Associate justice of the Supreme Court of Mississippi from 1984 to 2000 | |
| Merrick H. Truly | Mu Theta, 1925 | U.S. Army officer who helped plan battlefield-deception operations for the top-secret “Ghost Army” during World War II | |
| Carl Walters | Delta, 1924 | Influential Mississippi sportswriter and longtime sports editor inducted into the Mississippi Sports Hall of Fame | |
