= Roger Ishee =

American petroleum engineer and politician

Roger G. Ishee (March 25, 1930 – June 21, 2015) was an American petroleum engineer and politician.

Born in Dushua, Jasper County, Mississippi, Ishee served in the United States Air Force from 1948 to 1953. He then received his bachelor's degree in petroleum engineering at Louisiana State University. He then worked in the oil industry and was a civilian instructor in the United States Air Force. Ishee was also general manager at Floral Hills Memorial Gardens. He lived with his family in Gulfport, Mississippi. From 1997 to 2012, Ishee served in the Mississippi House of Representatives as a Republican. Ishee died in a hospital in New Orleans, Louisiana.
